= The Allure =

Professional wrestling stable

Stable
- Name(s): The Allure; Allure; The Allüre; Allüre
- Former members: Angelina Love; Velvet Sky; Mandy Leon
- Debut: April 6, 2019
- Years active: 2019–2022; 2023

The Allure was a professional wrestling stable affiliated with the Ring of Honor (ROH) professional wrestling promotion where Angelina Love, Velvet Sky and Mandy Leon were all members throughout their several incarnations. A notable win for the Women of Honor World Championship was acquired by Angelina Love who was one of the members of the stable while the stable was still active.

== Concept ==
The concept is similar to the movie Mean Girls, exactly the way that the trio's sub-group The Beautiful People involving group members Angelina Love and Velvet Sky is.

== History ==
=== Ring of Honor (2019–2021; 2023) ===
On April 6, 2019, at the ROH-NJPW G1 Supercard 2019 in New York City, the group made their debut as Angelina Love and Velvet Sky made their debut in Ring of Honor aligning with Mandy Leon, forming the stable. The trio attacked Kelly Klein, who had just won the Women of Honor World Championship from Mayu Iwatani as well as Jenny Rose and Stella Grey who tried to make the save for Klein.

On June 28, 2019 at ROH Best in the World Angelina Love & Mandy Leon with Velvet Sky in their corner defeated Jenny Rose and Kelly Klein in a ROH Women of Honor tag team match.

On September 28, 2019 at Death Before Dishonor XVII Angelina Love defeated Kelly Klein to become the new ROH Women of Honor Champion, but her reign only lasted for 15 days before Kelly Klein quickly got the title back from her on October 12, 2019 at Glory By Honor XVII.

On December 13, 2019 at Final Battle Angelina Love with Mandy Leon in her corner faced Maria Manic but was unsuccessful.

==== Velvet Sky group departure (2020) ====
During year 2020 Velvet Sky strayed away from the group, separating herself and leaving only Angelina Love & Mandy Leon in The Allure as she was removed from the ROH website in October 2020.

On November 12, 2020 it was announced that The Allure's Angelina Love & Mandy Leon were suspended from ROH following the duo's attack on backstage correspondent Quinn McKay.

==== Angelina and Mandy Leon ROH return (2021–2022; 2023) ====
On July 20, 2021 after the ROH Women of Honor Championship had been deactivated Angelina Love and Mandy Leon (Coming back from their suspension.) had entered the inaugural ROH Women's World Championship tournament, Angelina Love got a bye in the first round to advance as Mandy Leon lost to Quinn McKay in the first round. During the second round Angelina Love won against Max the Impaler via disqualification and in the quarterfinals lost to Rok-C.

On August 20, 2021 at Glory By Honor XVIII Night 1 Angelina Love & Mandy Leon faced Vita VonStarr and Max The Impaler in a ROH Women of Honor tag team match but we're unsuccessful.

On October 27, 2021 Angelina Love & Mandy Leon challenged The Hex (Allysin Kay & Marti Belle) for the NWA World Women's Tag Team Championship's but we're not successful.

On December 11, 2021 Angelina Love & Mandy Leon teamed up with Miranda Alize to take on Chelsea Green and The Hex (Allysin Kay & Marti Belle) in a six-women tag team match at ROH Final Battle and we're successful.

On September 21, 2023 Angelina Love faced longest reigning ROH Women's World Champion Athena for the ROH Women's World Championship but was unsuccessful.

Before the end December the group officially disbanded in 2023.

== Championships and accomplishments ==
- Ring of Honor
  - Women of Honor World Championship (1-time) – Angelina Love
