= Final Battle (2021) =

2021 Ring of Honor pay-per-view

- Promotional poster featuring various ROH wrestlers
- Promotion: Ring of Honor
- Date: December 11, 2021
- City: Baltimore, Maryland
- Venue: Chesapeake Employers Insurance Arena
- Attendance: 1,620
- Tagline: The End of an Era

Event chronology
← Previous; Honor for All	Next → Supercard of Honor

Final Battle chronology
← Previous; 2020	Next → 2022

The 2021 Final Battle was a professional wrestling pay-per-view event produced by American promotion Ring of Honor (ROH). It was the 20th Final Battle event and took place on December 11, 2021 at the Chesapeake Employers Insurance Arena in Baltimore, Maryland. The event was billed as "The End of an Era", as it was the last Ring of Honor event to be held before the company went on hiatus, eventually resuming operations in April 2022.

Eleven matches were contested at the event, with three matches on the pre-show. In the main event, Jonathan Gresham defeated Jay Lethal to win the vacant ROH World Championship. In other prominent matches, Dragon Lee defeated Rey Horus, Shane Taylor defeated Kenny King by pinfall in a Fight Without Honor match, Rok-C defeated Willow Nightingale to retain the ROH Women's World Championship and The Briscoe Brothers (Jay Briscoe and Mark Briscoe) defeated The OGK (Matt Taven and Mike Bennett) to win the ROH World Tag Team Championship. The event is also notable for the ROH return of Deonna Purrazzo, and the debuts of Adam Scherr, Westin Blake and the tag team FTR. As well as well wishes sent via pre-recorded message from ROH alumni Eddie Edwards, Moose, Jerry Lynn, Jimmy Jacobs, Matt Hardy, Christopher Daniels, Jay Lethal, Colt Cabana, "Hangman" Adam Page, CM Punk, Cody Rhodes, B. J. Whitmer, Adam Cole, The Young Bucks, and Bryan Danielson.

== Production ==
Other on-screen personnel
Role:	Name:
Commentators	Ian Riccaboni
Commentators	Caprice Coleman
Ring announcer	Bobby Cruise
Backstage interviewer	Denise Salcedo
Referees
Referees	Stephon Smith
Referees	Paul Turner
Referees	Mike Posey

=== Background ===
Final Battle is a professional wrestling event produced by Ring of Honor. First held in 2002, it is traditionally ROH's last show in the calendar year. It is widely regarded as Ring of Honor's premiere flagship event, similar to WWE's WrestleMania.

On October 11, 2021, ROH announced that Final Battle would be held at the Chesapeake Employers Insurance Arena in Baltimore, Maryland on December 11.

=== Storylines ===
The event featured eleven professional wrestling matches, which involved different wrestlers from pre-existing scripted feuds, plots, and storylines that play out on ROH's television programs. Wrestlers portray villains or heroes as they follow a series of events that build tension and culminate in a wrestling match or series of matches.

At Death Before Dishonor, Rok-C defeated Miranda Alize in the finals of the Quest for Gold tournament to become the inaugural ROH Women's World Champion. On the October 2 episode of Ring of Honor Wrestling, Rok-C would have her first in-ring interview as champion, before being interrupted by Alize, Trish Adora, Willow Nightingale, Allysin Kay, and The Allure (Angelina Love and Mandy Leon). Seeing the talent in the ring, ROH Board of Directors member Maria Kanellis-Bennett would make two three-way matches, with the winners facing off in a #1 contender's match the week before Final Battle. The winner of that match will go onto the event to face Rok-C for the ROH Women's World Championship. The following week, Willow bested Love and Alize in the first match to advance to the #1 contender's match. On November 20, Leon defeated Kay and Adora in the second match. On December 4, Willow defeated Leon, thus making her Rok-C's challenger at Final Battle.

On the February 27 "Championship Edition" of Ring of Honor Wrestling, Rush defeated Shane Taylor to retain the ROH World Championship thanks to a chair shot from Rush's stablemate Kenny King. King and Taylor were old friends and also former partners in The Rebellion stable with Caprice Coleman and Rhett Titus. Seeing this as an act of betrayal, Taylor would begin a long-running feud with King, which would extend to a stable rivalry between Shane Taylor Promotions and La Facción Ingobernable. At Death Before Dishonor, STP were scheduled to defend the ROH World Six-Man Tag Team Championship against LFI's King, Dragon Lee, and La Bestia del Ring (who replaced Rush due to injury). Before the bell rang, King repeatedly struck Taylor with a steel chair, rendering him unable to compete and leaving O'Shay Edwards to take his place. By the end of the match, Taylor returned to give King a chair shot of his own, allowing STP to retain the titles. On the November 12 edition of ROH's weekly web news article Eck's Files by Kevin Eck, it was announced that Shane Taylor and Kenny King will have a one-on-one grudge match at Final Battle. On the December 7 edition of ROH Week By Week, it was announced that this match would turn into a Fight Without Honor, courtesy of the ROH Board of Directors.

On October 4, former ROH Pure Champion Jonathan Gresham announced his entry into the ROH World Championship picture. This transition was hinted at the end of Death Before Dishonor, when Gresham and The Foundation arrived after Bandido's title defense against Brody King, Demonic Flamita, and EC3; where Gresham would shake Bandido's hand. At Honor for All, Gresham defeated No. 1 contender King, allowing him to advance to Final Battle and challenge Bandido for the ROH World Championship. However, on December 9. it was announced that Bandido tested positive for COVID-19, meaning he would be taken off the card. To replace him, two-time ROH World Champion and new All Elite Wrestling signee Jay Lethal, whose loyalty to The Foundation has been question after Vincent showed a clip of Lethal saying "I don't even like The Foundation", will now wrestle Gresham at Final Battle. At the event, it was announced that this match will be for the now vacated ROH World Championship, represented by the original title belt.

On the November 18 episode of Ring of Honor Wrestling, Brian Johnson officially entered the ROH Pure Championship division, winning a Pure Rules gauntlet match by last eliminating LSG via a dirty pinfall. Johnson would continue to bend the pure wrestling rules in matches against his former mentor P. J. Black and John Walters, before he would eventually become the No. 1 ranked contender. With his new position in the rankings, Johnson faced Pure Champion Josh Woods at Final Battle.

== Results ==
No.	Results	Stipulations	Times
1^{P}	The Righteous (Vincent, Bateman, and Dutch) (with Vita VonStarr) defeated Shane Taylor Promotions (Kaun, Moses and O'Shay Edwards) (with Ron Hunt) (c) by pinfall	Six man tag team match for the ROH World Six Man Tag Team Championship	10:00
2^{P}	Miranda Alize and The Allüre (Angelina Love and Mandy Leon) defeated Chelsea Green and The Hex (Allysin Kay and Marti Belle) by pinfall	Six-woman tag team match	6:50
3^{P}	P. J. Black, Flip Gordon, Brian Milonas, Beer City Bruiser, and World Famous CB defeated LSG, Sledge, Max the Impaler, Demonic Flamita, and Will Ferrara (with Amy Rose) by pinfall	10-man tag team match	10:20
4	Dragon Lee defeated Rey Horus by pinfall	Singles match	11:20
5	Rhett Titus defeated Dalton Castle (c), Silas Young and Joe Hendry by pinfall	Four Corner Survival match for the ROH World Television Championship	8:15
6	Josh Woods (c) defeated Brian Johnson by technical submission	Pure wrestling rules match for the ROH Pure Championship	12:58
7	Shane Taylor defeated Kenny King by pinfall	Fight Without Honor	18:00
8	Rok-C (c) defeated Willow Nightingale by pinfall	Singles match for the ROH Women's World Championship	9:50
9	VLNCE UNLTD (Brody King, Homicide, and Tony Deppen), and Rocky Romero (with Chris Dickinson) defeated EC3, Eli Isom, Taylor Rust, and Tracy Williams by pinfall	Eight-man tag team match	14:45
10	The Briscoe Brothers (Jay Briscoe and Mark Briscoe) defeated The OGK (Matt Taven and Mike Bennett) (c) (with Maria Kanellis-Bennett) by pinfall	Tag team match for the ROH World Tag Team Championship	15:40
11	Jonathan Gresham defeated Jay Lethal by submission	Singles match for the vacant ROH World Championship	15:35
(c) / – the champion(s) heading into the match; P / – the match was broadcast on the pre-show
