= Honor for All (2021) =

2021 Ring of Honor pay-per-view

Honor For All
- Promotional poster
- Promotion: Ring of Honor
- Date: November 14, 2021
- City: Baltimore, Maryland
- Venue: Chesapeake Employers Insurance Arena

Honor Club chronology
← Previous; Death Before Dishonor XVIII	Next → Final Battle

Honor for All chronology
← Previous; 2019	Next → —

Honor for All was a professional wrestling event produced by American promotion Ring of Honor (ROH). It took place on November 14, 2021, at the Chesapeake Employers Insurance Arena in Baltimore, Maryland and aired exclusively on Honor Club. It was the company's penultimate event before the promotion goes on hiatus.

== Production ==
=== Storylines ===
Other on-screen personnel
Role:	Name:
Commentators	Ian Riccaboni
Commentators	Caprice Coleman
Ring announcer	Bobby Cruise
Backstage interviewer	Denise Salcedo
Referees
Referees	Stephon Smith
Referees	Paul Turner
Referees	Mike Posey

The event will feature several professional wrestling matches, which involve different wrestlers from pre-existing scripted feuds, plots, and storylines that play out on ROH's television programs. Wrestlers portray villains or heroes as they follow a series of events that build tension and culminate in a wrestling match or series of matches.

After losing the ROH World Six-Man Tag Team Championship on the February 20 edition of Ring of Honor Wrestling and the rematch at the ROH 19th Anniversary Show, The MexiSquad (Bandido, Flamita, and Rey Horus) began to squabble and hint at breaking up. Bandido and Flamita, in particular, had gripes with one another, to a point where they finally disbanded the team in a match with The Foundation (Jay Lethal and Jonathan Gresham) on the April 10 episode of Ring of Honor Wrestling. The two would meet in a match on May 1, which the newly dubbed Demonic Flamita won after a low blow to Bandido. They would meet again in the 2021 Survival of the Fittest final, where Bandido emerged victorious. He would go on to capture the ROH World Championship from Rush at Best in the World. After defending the title against Flip Gordon at Glory By Honor, Brody King, EC3, and Flamita - who entered the ROH World Title rankings after winning a Six-Man Mayhem match earlier in the night - confronted Bandido. Bandido would surpass all three men in a four-way elimination match at Death Before Dishonor. On the November 2 edition of ROH Week by Week, when the Honor for All card was announced, Bandido and Demonic Flamita were set for the main event in a non-title no disqualification match.

On October 4, after losing the ROH Pure Championship to Josh Woods, Jonathan Gresham announced his entry into the ROH World Title rankings. His first match in the division was announced for Honor for All against No. 1 contender Brody King, in the ongoing feud between The Foundation and Violence Unlimited. The winner of this match will go on to Final Battle to face ROH World Champion Bandido.

At Game Changer Wrestling's Fight Club: Mox vs. Gage on October 9, The Briscoe Brothers (Jay Briscoe and Mark Briscoe) confronted The Second Gear Crew (Mance Warner and Matthew Justice), challenging them for the GCW World Tag Team Championship. The Briscoes would go on to win the titles at War Ready. The Briscoes will make their first defense of the titles at Honor for All against AJ Gray and Effy of Second Gear Crew.

== Results ==
No.	Results	Stipulations	Times
1	Taylor Rust defeated Tracy Williams	Pure wrestling rules match	11:47
2	Holidead defeated Quinn McKay, Trish Adora and Vita VonStarr	Four Corner Survival match Winner earns a future ROH Women's World Championship match	13:52
3	The Briscoe Brothers (Jay Briscoe and Mark Briscoe) (c) defeated The Second Gear Crew (AJ Gray and Effy)	Tag team match for the GCW World Tag Team Championship	8:33
4	Jonathan Gresham defeated Brody King	Singles match to determine the #1 contender for the ROH World Championship	10:51
5	The OGK (Matt Taven and Mike Bennett) defeated La Facción Ingobernable (Dragon Lee and Kenny King) (c)	Tag team match for the ROH World Tag Team Championship	11:59
6	Bandido defeated Demonic Flamita	No Disqualification match	13:33
(c) / – the champion(s) heading into the match
