= Glory By Honor XVIII =

2021 Ring of Honor pay-per-view

- Promotion: Ring of Honor
- Date: Night 1: August 20, 2021; Night 2: August 21, 2021
- City: Philadelphia, Pennsylvania
- Venue: 2300 Arena
- Attendance: Night 1: N/A; Night 2: 482

Honor Club chronology
← Previous; Best in the World	Next → Death Before Dishonor XVIII

Glory By Honor chronology
← Previous; XVII	Next → —

Glory By Honor XVIII was a two-night professional wrestling event produced by Ring of Honor (ROH). It took place on August 20 and 21, 2021 at the 2300 Arena in Philadelphia, Pennsylvania and aired exclusively on Honor Club. The event was the first ROH show to be held outside the state of Maryland (where ROH has been producing shows since their September return) since Gateway to Honor in St. Louis last February. As the name implied, it was the 18th event in the Glory By Honor chronology.

== Production ==
Other on-screen personnel
Role:	Name:
Commentators	Ian Riccaboni
Commentators	Caprice Coleman
Ring announcer	Bobby Cruise
Backstage interviewer	Denise Salcedo
Referees
Referees	Stephon Smith
Referees	Paul Turner
Referees	Mike Posey

=== Storylines ===
The event will feature professional wrestling matches, which involve different wrestlers from pre-existing scripted feuds, plots, and storylines that play out on ROH's television programs. Wrestlers portray villains or heroes as they follow a series of events that build tension and culminate in a wrestling match or series of matches.

Night 1

At ROH Free Enterprise the previous February, Flip Gordon - disguised as Dragon Lee - won a 20-man battle royal to win a future ROH World Championship match. On June 16, it was announced that Gordon will get his match for the title, currently held by Bandido, on night one of Glory By Honor.

Three factions within ROH - La Faccion Ingobernable (LFI), Violence Unlimited (VU), and The Foundation - have been battling with each other since the beginning of 2021 for supremacy and power within the promotion. During Night 1 of Glory By Honor, LFI and VU will face off in an eight-man tag team match.

Two members of The Foundation - the faction that wants to return ROH to its roots of focusing on technical/"pure" wrestling - will wrestle each other on Night 1 for the ROH Pure Championship, with champion Jonathan Gresham defending against teammate Rhett Titus.

Night 2

At ROH's 19th Anniversary Show, Matt Taven and Vincent fought in an unsanctioned match at the Police Athletic League Hall of Fame, which ended in a no contest after Dutch - the newest member of Vincent's Righteous faction - blindsided both men while they sat on the second story guardrail, causing them to crash through tables. After the crash, Dutch carried Vincent out of the venue, to which Vincent would leave on a "spiritual journey" and not be seen in quite some time. On the May 22 episode of Ring of Honor Wrestling, where Taven and OGK partner Mike Bennett challenged The Foundation's Rhett Titus and Tracy Williams for the ROH World Tag Team Championship, Taven was attacked backstage beforehand and had his ankle injured. The OGK would lose the match as a result. After the match, the titantron displayed The Righteous and a returning Vincent, naming him as Taven's assailant. After many more weeks of torment, Taven looked to settle things once and for all on a live edition of his talk show, "Trending with Taven", on the Best in the World Hour One pre-show, where The Righteous were his guests. There, Taven presented Vincent with a contract for one last match, where Taven was willing to leave ROH no matter the result just to get away from Vincent. However, Vincent swayed Taven away from that stipulation, saying while he doesn't want to end Taven's ROH career, he would like his rematch clause for the ROH World Championship. He even added on the stipulation of a steel cage match. Figuring it was the only way, Taven agreed, and the match was set for night two of Glory By Honor.

Also at Night 2, The Foundation - which has been part of the three-way faction war with LFI and VU throughout all of 2021 - will wrestle VU in an eight-man tag team match.

== Results ==
=== Night 1 ===
Night 1 poster

No.	Results	Stipulations	Times
1^{D}	Rok-C and Miranda Alize defeated Chelsea Green and Sumie Sakai	Tag team match	8:05
2	Silas Young defeated Rey Horus	Singles match	7:54
3	Demonic Flamita defeated Eli Isom, Dak Draper, Danhausen, Mike Bennett and P. J. Black	Six-Man Mayhem match for a spot in the ROH World Championship rankings	11:47
4	Vita VonStarr and Max the Impaler defeated The Allure (Angelina Love and Mandy Leon)	Tag team match	6:39
5	EC3 defeated Brian Johnson	Singles match	12:48
6	Mark Briscoe defeated Bateman (with Dutch)	Singles match	6:19
7	Jonathan Gresham (c) defeated Rhett Titus	Pure wrestling rules match for the ROH Pure Championship	14:43
8	Violence Unlimited (Brody King, Tony Deppen, Homicide and Chris Dickinson) vs. La Faccion Ingobernable (Dragon Lee, Kenny King, La Bestia del Ring, and Rush) ended in a no contest	Eight-man tag team match	1:48
9	Violence Unlimited (Brody King, Tony Deppen, Homicide and Chris Dickinson) defeated La Faccion Ingobernable (Dragon Lee, Kenny King, La Bestia del Ring, and Rush)	Philadelphia Street Fight	15:35
10	Bandido (c) defeated Flip Gordon	Singles match for the ROH World Championship	17:18
(c) / – the champion(s) heading into the match; D / – this was a dark match

=== Night 2 ===
Night 2 poster

No.	Results	Stipulations	Times
1^{D}	Trish Adora defeated Sumie Sakai	Singles match	6:07
2	Dalton Castle defeated Danhausen	Singles match	8:08
3	LSG defeated World Famous CB	Pure wrestling rules match	7:21
4	Miranda Alize and Rok-C defeated Chelsea Green and Willow	Tag team match	7:45
5	Shane Taylor Promotions (Jasper Kaun, Moses Maddox, and Shane Taylor) (with O'Shay Edwards and Ron Hunt) (c) defeated Incoherence (Delirious, Frightmare, and Hallowicked) (with UltraMantis Black)	Six-man tag team match for the ROH World Six-Man Tag Team Championship	13:18
6	Mark Briscoe and Brian Johnson defeated Flip Gordon and Demonic Flamita	Tag team match	11:23
7	The Foundation (Jay Lethal, Jonathan Gresham, Rhett Titus, and Tracy Williams) defeated Violence Unlimited (Brody King, Tony Deppen, Homicide and Chris Dickinson)	Eight-man tag team match	16:05
8	La Faccion Ingobernable (Dragon Lee and Rush) defeated MexiSquad (Bandido and Rey Horus)	Tag team match	13:02
9	Vincent defeated Matt Taven	Steel cage match for Taven's future ROH World Championship opportunity	19:37
(c) / – the champion(s) heading into the match; D / – this was a dark match
