= Death Before Dishonor XVIII =

2021 Ring of Honor pay-per-view

- Promotional poster
- Promotion: Ring of Honor
- Date: September 12, 2021
- City: Philadelphia, Pennsylvania
- Venue: 2300 Arena
- Attendance: 340

Pay-per-view chronology
← Previous; Glory By Honor XVIII	Next → Honor for All

ROH Death Before Dishonor chronology
← Previous; XVII	Next → 2022

Death Before Dishonor XVIII was a professional wrestling pay-per-view produced by Ring of Honor (ROH). It was the eighteenth event in the Death Before Dishonor chronology. It took place on September 12, 2021. The show was originally supposed to emanate from the RP Funding Center in Lakeland, Florida, but due to a surge of COVID-19 in Florida at the time, the location was changed to the 2300 Arena at Philadelphia, Pennsylvania. It marked the last time Death Before Dishonor had Roman numerals in its name.

== Production ==
Other on-screen personnel
Role:	Name:
Commentators	Ian Riccaboni
Commentators	Caprice Coleman
Ring announcer	Bobby Cruise
Backstage interviewer	Denise Salcedo
Referees
Referees	Stephon Smith
Referees	Paul Turner
Referees	Mike Posey

=== Background ===
At Best in the World, it was announced that Death Before Dishonor would return to pay-per-view in the month of September, with the ROH website confirming the date as September 12.

=== Storylines ===
The event featured professional wrestling matches, which involved different wrestlers from pre-existing scripted feuds, plots, and storylines that played out on ROH's television programs. Wrestlers portrayed villains or heroes as they followed a series of events that built tension and culminated in a wrestling match or series of matches.

A key feature of the event was the finals of the ROH Women's World Championship tournament. The tournament was announced by ROH Board of Directors member Maria Kanellis-Bennett at the ROH 19th Anniversary Show, while the brackets and title belt were revealed at Best in the World, where former ROH ring announcer Lenny Leonard was revealed as the special commentator for the tournament in the coming weeks. The tournament began on the July 31 episode of Ring of Honor Wrestling. On the September 4 episode, Miranda Alize and Rok-C defeated Trish Adora and Angelina Love, respectively, to move onto the finals at Death Before Dishonor.

On the August 10 episode of ROH Week By Week, it was announced that top ROH Pure Championship contender Josh Woods would challenge for the title at Death Before Dishonor. At Glory By Honor, Pure Champion Jonathan Gresham defeated fellow Foundation teammate Rhett Titus, and will now face Woods at Death Before Dishonor.

At Glory By Honor Night 1, Demonic Flamita won a Six Man Mayhem match featuring P. J. Black, Danhausen, Mike Bennett, Eli Isom, and Dak Draper to earn a spot on the ROH World Championship rankings. Later on, his old tag team partner Bandido made his first successful defense of the ROH World Championship against Flip Gordon. After the match, top contenders Flamita, Brody King and EC3 would confront Bandido, before the four got into a brawl. On Night 2, Quinn McKay announced that Bandido will defend the world title at Death Before Dishonor in a Four-Way Elimination match against King, EC3, and Flamita.

Also on Glory By Honor Night 2, McKay announced that two mystery free agents will be in singles competition against each other at Death Before Dishonor. On September 3, it was revealed that former WWE wrestlers Jake Atlas and Taylor Rust were the aforementioned competitors.

Homicide, Chris Dickinson, and Tony Deppen of Violence Unlimited challenged any pure wrestlers past, present, and future to a six-man tag team match at the event. On the August 31 edition of Week By Week, former ROH Pure Champion John Walters, ROH top prospect LSG, and independent wrestler Lee Moriarty answered the challenge.

For weeks, Dalton Castle has been attempting to improve the showmanship of Ring of Honor Wrestling, and started by attempting to recruit young wrestlers Dak Draper and Eli Isom as his proteges. After sitting ringside for their matches with each other, and a failed bid at the ROH World Six-Man Tag Team Championship at Best in the World, the three men had a three-way match on July 24. There, Draper pinned Isom after Castle threw a chair into Isom's head. On the August 31 Week By Week, it was announced that Isom and Castle will face off at Death Before Dishonor.

== Results ==
No.	Results	Stipulations	Times
1^{P}	Alex Zayne won by last eliminating P. J. Black	16-man Honor Rumble for an ROH World Championship match	32:07
2	Dalton Castle defeated Eli Isom by pinfall	Singles match	9:16
3	Taylor Rust defeated Jake Atlas by submission	Singles match	6:55
4	Violence Unlimited (Homicide, Chris Dickinson, and Tony Deppen) defeated John Walters, LSG, and Lee Moriarty by pinfall	Six-man tag team match	10:58
5	The OGK (Matt Taven and Mike Bennett) defeated The Briscoes (Jay Briscoe and Mark Briscoe) by pinfall	Tag team match	13:07
6	Josh Woods defeated Jonathan Gresham (c) by pinfall	Pure wrestling rules match for the ROH Pure Championship	20:01
7	Shane Taylor Promotions (Jasper Kaun, Moses Maddox, and O'Shay Edwards) (with Ron Hunt) (c) defeated La Facción Ingobernable (Dragon Lee, Kenny King, and La Bestia del Ring) by pinfall	Six-man tag team match for the ROH World Six-Man Tag Team Championship	11:27
8	Rok-C defeated Miranda Alize by pinfall	Tournament final to become the inaugural ROH Women's World Champion	18:13
9	Bandido (c) defeated Brody King and Demonic Flamita and EC3	Four Corner Survival Elimination match for the ROH World Championship	17:09
(c) / – the champion(s) heading into the match; P / – the match was broadcast on the pre-show

=== Tournament bracket ===
First Round^{1} ^{2} ROH Wrestling; July 30; August 7 and 14; ROH Women's Division Wednesday; August 4
Rok-C	Pin
Sumie Sakai	9:36
Mandy Leon	7:12
Quinn McKay^{3} ^{4} ^{5}	Pin
Holidead	9:18
Max the Impaler	Pin
Angelina Love	Bye
–^{6}
Alex Gracia	8:43
Miranda Alize	Pin
Mazzerati	8:45
Nicole Savoy	Pin
Willow Nightingale	11:30
Allysin Kay	Sub
Marti Belle	7:13
Trish Adora	Sub

Quarterfinals; ROH Wrestling; August 21 and 28
Rok-C	Pin
Quinn McKay	10:14
Max the Impaler	5:53
Angelina Love	DQ
Miranda Alize	Pin
Nicole Savoy	13:04
Allysin Kay	13:30
Trish Adora	Pin

Semifinals; ROH Wrestling; September 4
Rok-C	Sub
Angelina Love	6:44
Miranda Alize	Sub
Trish Adora	12:16

Final; Death Before Dishonor XVIII; September 12
Rok-C	Pin
Miranda Alize	18:13

1 Participants in the original tournament included: Ashley Vox, Gia Scott, Heather Monroe, Jenny Rose, Katarina, Kellyanne, Lindsay Snow, Maria Manic, Session Moth Martina, and Tasha Steelz.
2 Brandi Lauren and Laynie Luck were named as alternates.
3 Spot was originally meant for Vita VonStarr, but her interference in matches involving The Righteous got her removed.
4 Allie Recks was slated to take VonStarr's place in the tournament, but a knee injury kept her from competing.
5 Chelsea Green was slated to take VonStarr's place in the tournament, but a broken wrist kept her from competing.
6 Love defeated Quinn McKay on the May 8 ROH Wrestling episode to earn a bye.

=== Honor Rumble entrants ===
– Winner

Draw	Entrant	Order	Eliminated by	Time	Eliminations
1	Brian Johnson	13	Flip Gordon	28:47	3
2	Brian Milonas	2	Caprice Coleman	7:04	0
3	Beer City Bruiser	1	Caprice Coleman	6:29	0
4	Danhausen	5	Brian Johnson	18:02	0
5	Caprice Coleman	3	Brian Johnson	7:14	2
6	Sledge	4	Dak Draper	15:18	0
7	PCO	6	Himself	28:47	1
8	P. J. Black	15	Alex Zayne	32:07	0
9	Dak Draper	10	Alex Zayne	25:21	3
10	Silas Young	7	Flip Gordon	19:56	0
11	Rey Horus	12	Brian Johnson	28:47	1
12	Dante Caballero	8	Dak Draper	23:32	0
13	Flip Gordon	14	Alex Zayne	28:47	2
14	Joe Keys	9	Dak Draper	23:50	0
15	World Famous CB	11	Rey Horus	26:15	0
16	Alex Zayne	—	Winner	32:07	3

=== ROH World Championship match ===
Eliminated	Wrestler	Eliminated by	Method of elimination	Time
1	EC3	N/A	Eliminated via disqualification (steel chair)	8:49
2	Demonic Flamita	Brody King	Pinned after the All Seeing Eye	13:43
3	Brody King	Bandido	Pinned with a magistral cradle	17:09
Winner	Bandido (c)	—N/a		17:09
