= ROH Top Prospect Tournament =

The Top Prospect Tournament was a professional wrestling tournament held by Ring of Honor since 2011. The inaugural tournament took place in 2011 and had occurred every year since except for 2012 and 2018. The tournament was last held in 2019 and was discontinued after that.

== Format ==
Aspiring ROH wrestlers compete in a variety of "qualifying" singles matches with the winner(s) of each match advancing to the next round. There are three rounds, with the winner of the Top Prospect Tournament receiving a Ring of Honor contract and a shot at a Ring of Honor championship.

== History ==
The tournament started in 2011 with the goal of giving rising wrestlers a chance of getting an ROH contract and displaying their talents for the promotion. In 2011, the first winner of the tournament was Mike Bennett, who went on to become an ROH mainstay. After a one-year break, the tournament returned in 2013 with the winner getting a chance at Adam Cole's ROH World Television Championship. The winner of the 2013 tournament was Matt Taven, who associated himself with Truth Martini and captured Cole's championship at the 11th Anniversary Show. He went on to become the longest reigning Television Champion in ROH history since the title's inception in 2010 before losing it to Tommaso Ciampa.

In 2014, Hanson won the tournament by defeating future tag team partner Raymond Rowe in the finals. In 2015, Donovan Dijak won a Ring of Honor contract after beating Will Ferrara. In 2016, Lio Rush defeated Brian Fury to win the tournament and instead gained an ROH World Championship opportunity against Jay Lethal. Rush lost the match and left ROH less than two years later.

Dak Draper was the final of the Top Prospect Tournament, having won in 2019. The tournament as discontinued after that.

== List of winners ==
- 2011 – Mike Bennett
- 2013 – Matt Taven
- 2014 – Hanson
- 2015 – Donovan Dijak
- 2016 – Lio Rush
- 2017 – Josh Woods
- 2019 - Dak Draper

== Tournament history ==
=== 2011 ===
ROH's first Top Prospect Tournament took place in January 2011.

First round
Kyle O'Reilly	Pin
Jonathan Gresham
Michael Elgin	Pin
Bobby Dempsey
Mike Bennett	Pin
Adam Cole
Andy Ridge
Grizzly Redwood

Semifinals
Kyle O'Reilly
Michael Elgin
Mike Bennett	Pin
Andy Ridge

Final
Kyle O'Reilly
Mike Bennett

=== 2013 ===
ROH's second Top Prospect Tournament took place in January and February 2013.

First round
TaDarius Thomas
Antonio Thomas
Q. T. Marshall
Mike Sydal
Silas Young
Adam Page
Matt Taven
A. C. H.

Semifinals
TaDarius Thomas
Q. T. Marshall
Silas Young
Matt Taven

Final
TaDarius Thomas
Matt Taven

=== 2014 ===
ROH's third Top Prospect Tournament took place in January and February 2014.

First round
Raymond Rowe
Kongo
Corey Hollis
Mike Posey
Andrew Everett
The Romantic Touch
Hanson
Cheeseburger

Semifinals
Raymond Rowe
Corey Hollis
Andrew Everett
Hanson

Final
Raymond Rowe
Hanson

=== 2015 ===
ROH's fourth Top Prospect Tournament took place in January and February 2015.

First round
Donovan Dijak
Jake Dirden
Ashley Sixx
Dalton Castle
Will Ferrara
J. Diesel
Beer City Bruiser
Mikey Webb

Semifinals
Donovan Dijak
Ashley Sixx
Will Ferrara
Beer City Bruiser

Final
Donovan Dijak
Will Ferrara

=== 2016 ===
ROH's fifth Top Prospect Tournament was announced in December 2015 as happening January 9.

First round
Lio Rush
Jason Kincaid
Punisher Martinez
Colby Corino
Action Ortiz
Leon St. Giovanni
Brian Fury
Shahim Ali

Semifinals
Lio Rush
Punisher Martinez
Action Ortiz
Brian Fury

Final
Lio Rush
Brian Fury

=== 2017 ===
ROH's sixth Top Prospect Tournament was announced in December 2016 as happening January 28.

First round
John Skyler
Sean Carr
Curt Stallion
Preston Quinn
Brian Milonas
Raphael King
Josh Woods
Chris LeRusso

Semifinals
John Skyler
Curt Stallion
Brian Milonas
Josh Woods

Final
John Skyler
Josh Woods

=== 2018 ===
After losing the Amazon Prime Video's Dojo Pro Black Belt for a ROH World Television Championship opportunity against Aaron Solow, Jeff Cobb made his ROH debut crashing the 2018 Top Prospect Tournament, interfering in three first round matches (Eli Isom vs FR Josie, Charles Zanders vs Marcus Kross, and Brian Johnson vs Dante Caballero), declaring himself the real winner of the tournament and fast-tracking his way to a TV title match against then-champion Punishment Martinez, which he won.

ROH does not official recognize Cobb as ROH Top Prospect Tournament winner as the official tournament was cancelled following his last interference.

=== 2019 ===
The seventh Top Prospect Tournament began on July 21, 2019 at the Mass Hysteria Event. The Semi-Finals were held during the joint ROH-CMLL show Global Wars Espectacular. Dak Draper defeated Austin Gunn at Death Before Dishonor XVII event on September 29, 2019.

First round
Dante Caballero
Joe Keys
Austin Gunn
Brian Johnson
Dak Draper
Makita
Haitian Sensation
Ken Dixon

Semifinals
Dante Caballero
Austin Gunn
Dak Draper
Haitian Sensation

Final
Austin Gunn
Dak Draper

== See also ==
- ROH World Tag Team Championship
- ROH Pure Championship
