= Mandy Leon =

American professional wrestler (born 1992)

Personal information
- Born: Amanda Leon; March 3, 1992 (age 34) Brooklyn, New York, U.S.
- Spouse: Delirious (m. 2023)
- Children: 1

Professional wrestling career
- Ring name: Mandy Leon
- Billed height: 5 ft 6 in (1.68 m)
- Billed weight: 180 lb (82 kg)
- Billed from: Brooklyn, New York
- Trained by: Delirious
- Debut: April 18, 2014

Amanda Leon (born March 3, 1992) is an American professional wrestler and model.

== Early life ==
Leon was born in Brooklyn, New York but grew up in both Lancaster and Harrisburg, Pennsylvania. She is of Puerto Rican, Cuban, Italian, and French descent.

== Professional wrestling career ==
=== Ring of Honor (2014–2022; 2023) ===
Leon made her Ring of Honor (ROH) and professional wrestling debut on April 18, 2014, in a losing effort to Jenny Rose. At ROH Future Of Honor #1 in Newville, Pennsylvania. Three months later Leon lost in a tag team match to Jenny Rose and Veda Scott at ROH Future Of Honor #2 event.

On July 25, 2015, Leon won her first match for Ring of Honor defeating Deonna Purrazzo in a dark match. During the ROH Reloaded Tour Leon lost to Taeler Hendrix. Later that year Leon and Sumie Sakai defeated Purrazzo and Hania "The Howling Huntress" getting her second victory in a dark match.

On February 6, 2016, Leon wrestled her first TV match for Ring Of Honor. In a losing effort to Hania the Howling Huntress at ROH on SBG #249 - Women of Honor Special. Leon defeated her in a rematch on July 8, 2016, in a 2 Out of 3 Falls match.

After ending her program with Hania, Leon entered a rivalry with Taeler Hendrix. The two wrestled in a dark match from the July 30 episode of ROH Television. Leon picked up the victory, but was attacked by Hendrix after the match. The two then brawled backstage. Weeks later, Leon came to the aid of Deonna Purrazzo, who was being attacked by Hendrix. This led to a tag match between the three, as well as a mystery partner for Taeler, in Lockport, New York, which saw Leon pinned by Hendrix's partner, Jessicka Havok, after Hendrix drilled her with a steel chair. These events all led to Leon and Hendrix squaring off in the first ever No Disqualification match in Women of Honor history at ROH on SBG #276, with Hendrix coming out on top after hitting her Kiss Goodnight finisher onto a pile of chairs, after Leon decided to not hit Hendrix with one herself. Because of this loss, Leon found herself attempting to go to "a darker place", becoming noticeably more aggressive in her matches. Unfortunately, the feud was cut short when Hendrix was granted her release from Ring of Honor. To write her off, Leon handed ROH commentator Ian Riccaboni a tarot card of death and said the WOH Division had been cleansed of dishonor. Leon would also wrestle her match that night with blood splattered on her body.

Leon defeated Jessicka Havok in a match that aired on December 14, 2016.

In March 2017, Leon was defeated by Sumie Sakai in a three-way match that also included Jenny Rose, while also displaying a heel persona and resorting to villainous tactics during the match. At the November 12 TV tapings, Leon defeated Stella Gray in singles action but did not air until the December 13th, 2017th episode of ROH Women of Honor.

Leon was later announced as one of the participants in the inaugural Women of Honor Championship tournament in 2018. She defeated Madison Rayne in the first round, but was defeated by Kelly Klein in the quarterfinals.

==== The Allure alliance stable (2019–2022) ====
At the G1 Supercard, Leon aligned herself with the debuting Angelina Love & Velvet Sky to form a stable known as "The Allure". The trio attacked Kelly Klein who just had won the ROH Women of Honor World Championship against Mayu Iwatani, as well as Jenny Rose and Stella Gray who tried to save Klein, turning heel in the process.

During year 2021 Mandy Leon entered the inaugural ROH Women's World Championship tournament but lost to Quinn McKay in the first round.

On August 20, 2021 at Glory By Honor XVIII Night 1 Angelina Love & Mandy Leon faced Vita VonStarr and Max The Impaler in a ROH Women of Honor tag team match but we're unsuccessful.

On October 27, 2021 Angelina Love & Mandy Leon challenged The Hex (Allysin Kay & Marti Belle) for the NWA World Women's Tag Team Championship's but we're not successful.

On December 11, 2021 Angelina Love & Mandy Leon teamed up with Miranda Alize to take on Chelsea Green and The Hex (Allysin Kay & Marti Belle) in a six-women tag team match at ROH Final Battle and we're successful.

=== WWE (2014–2015) ===
Leon made numerous appearances on WWE television in 2014 and 2015 as a "Rosebud" for Adam Rose.

In January 2015, it was reported that Leon took part in a WWE tryout camp at the WWE Performance Center in Orlando.

=== World Wonder Ring Stardom (2017) ===
On August 19, 2017, Leon made her debut for Japanese promotion World Wonder Ring Stardom, entering the 2017 5★Star GP and defeating former World of Stardom Champion Io Shirai in her opening match. Her next outing was a loss to Jungle Kyona. However, Leon rebounded from this, going on to defeat names like Toni Storm and HZK before losing to Kay Lee Ray. Leon's last two matches in the tournament saw her defeat Tam Nakano and suffer an upset loss to Konami.

=== Major League Wrestling (2023–2024) ===
At War Chamber, León debuted for Major League Wrestling aligned herself with Raven to form a stable known as "The Calling".

== Personal life ==
On November 14, 2023, Leon married Hunter Johnston, better known as former ROH wrestler Delirious. On July 18, 2024 the couple revealed they are expecting a baby. They welcomed their first child a daughter, on August 31, 2024.

== Championships and accomplishments ==
- Keystone Pro Wrestling
  - KPW Vixen Championship (2 times)
- The Ultimate Wrestling Experience
  - UWE Women's Championship (1 time)
- MCW Pro Wrestling / Maryland Championship Wrestling
  - MCW Women's Championship (1 time)
- Vicious Outcast Wrestling
  - VOW Vixen's Championship (1 time)
