= Roxanne Perez =

American professional wrestler (born 2001)

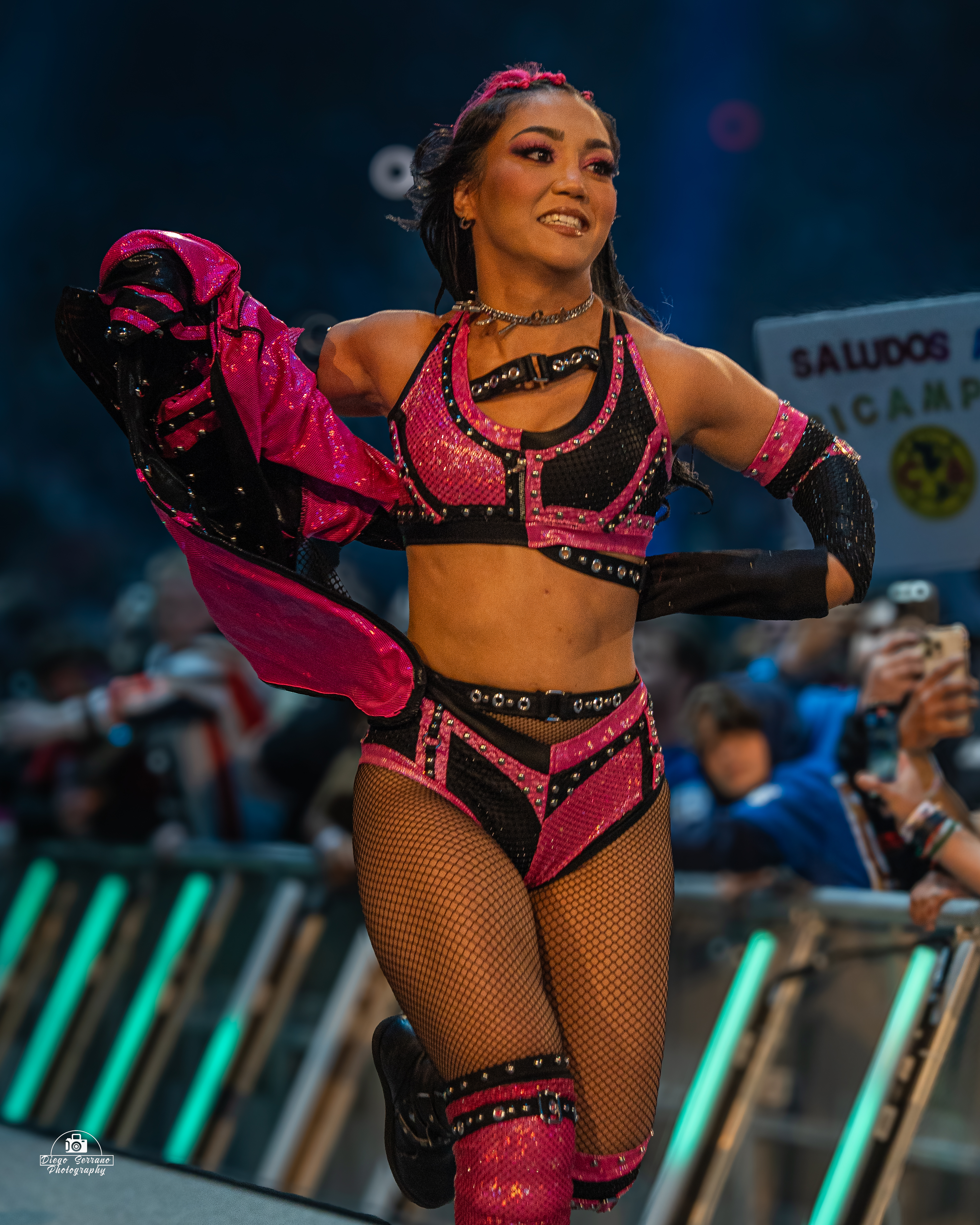
- Gonzalez in 2025

Personal information
- Born: Carla Gonzalez; November 5, 2001 (age 25) Laredo, Texas, U.S.

Professional wrestling career
- Ring names: Rok-C; Roxanne Perez
- Billed height: 5 ft 1 in (1.55 m)
- Billed from: Laredo, Texas
- Trained by: Laredo Wrestling Alliance; Booker T
- Debut: 2018

Carla Gonzalez (born November 5, 2001) is an American professional wrestler. As of March 2022, she is signed to WWE, where she performs on the Raw brand under the ring name Roxanne Perez, and is a member of the Judgment Day stable.

Before signing with WWE, Gonzalez wrestled under the ring name Rok-C. She worked for several independent promotions such as Reality of Wrestling (ROW). In 2021, she started performing for the national promotion Ring of Honor (ROH), where she was the inaugural ROH Women's World Champion. In WWE, she is a former one-time WWE Women's Tag Team Champion, a former two-time NXT Women's Champion, and a former one-time NXT Women's Tag Team Champion.

== Professional wrestling career ==
=== Independent circuit (2018–2022) ===
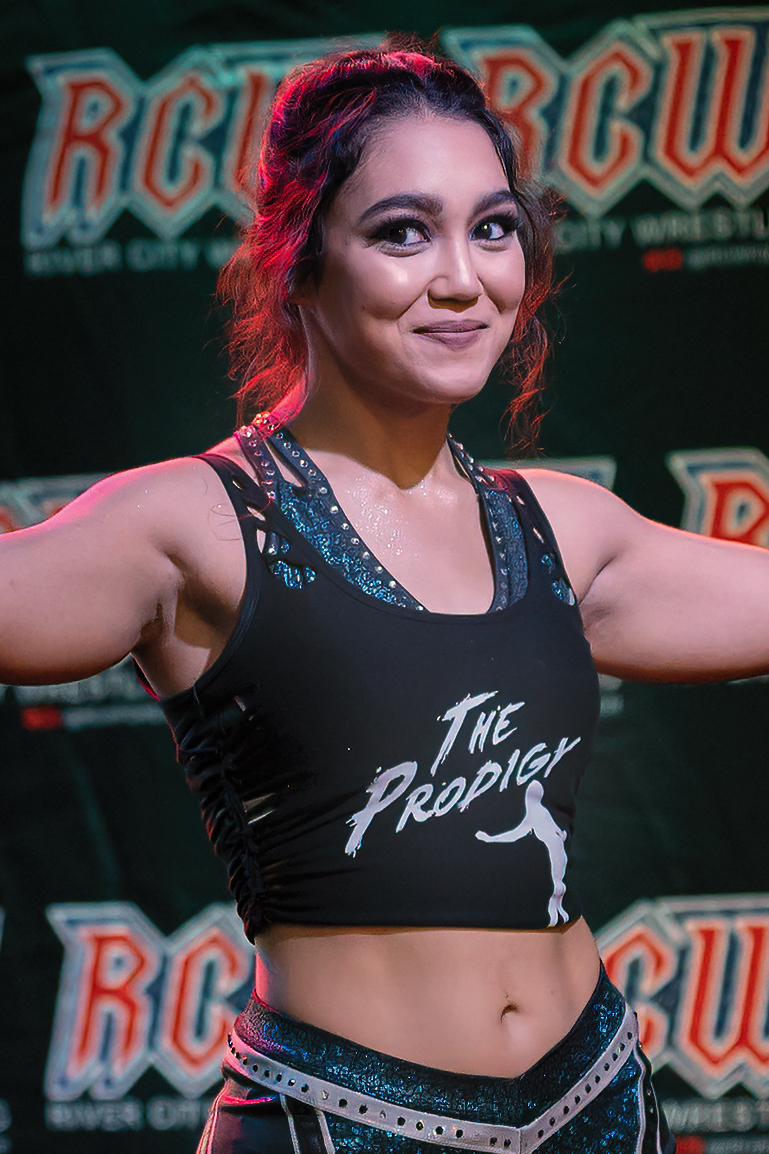
Gonzalez in 2021

Gonzalez began training at age 13, and later trained under Booker T under Reality of Wrestling school starting at age 16. She made her professional wrestling debut in December 2018 under the ring name Rok-C as she began wrestling for Booker T's promotion Reality of Wrestling (ROW). Rok-C spent the majority of her rookie years wrestling for promotions across her home state of Texas, most notably for ROW where she won the women's title, the ROW Diamonds Division Championship.

=== Ring of Honor (2021–2022) ===
In April 2021, Rok-C made her Ring of Honor (ROH) debut teaming with Max the Impaler in a time limit draw against Laynie Luck and Hyan. Rok-C then competed in the ROH Women's World Championship tournament where she defeated the likes of Sumie Sakai, Quinn McKay, and Angelina Love. In the finals at Death Before Dishonor XVIII, she defeated Miranda Alize to become the inaugural ROH Women's World Champion and youngest female champion in company history at age 19. At Final Battle, she retained her championship against Willow Nightingale in what was ROH's last pay-per-view event before going on hiatus. During post match, she was confronted by former Impact Knockouts Champion and reigning AAA Reina de Reinas Champion Deonna Purrazzo, who proposed a winner take all match at a future Impact Wrestling event. The match took place on the January 13 episode of Impact!, where she lost the ROH Women's World Championship against Purrazzo, who also put the AAA Reina de Reinas title on the line.

=== WWE (2022–present) ===
==== NXT (2022–2025) ====
In March 2022, it was reported that Gonzalez had signed a contract with WWE's developmental brand NXT and changed her ring name to Roxanne Perez. Perez made her WWE debut on the April 15 episode of NXT Level Up where she defeated Sloane Jacobs. She made her first NXT appearance on April 19, defeating Jacy Jayne. In May and June, Perez participated in the 2022 NXT Women's Breakout Tournament, and won by defeating Tiffany Stratton in the finals and earned a contract for a championship opportunity for a title of her choosing. At The Great American Bash, Perez and Cora Jade defeated Toxic Attraction (Gigi Dolin and Jayne) to become NXT Women's Tag Team Champions. The next week, Perez cashed in her guaranteed title shot on Mandy Rose for the NXT Women's Championship in a title match, yet Jade turned on her and cost Perez's championship opportunity. The following episode, Jade threw her championship belt in the garbage; as a result, the following week the tag title was eventually vacated. This change led into a match between Jade and Perez at Heatwave where Jade was victorious, and a weapons wild match at Halloween Havoc that Perez won.

In December 2022, Perez won the inaugural Iron Survivor Challenge at Deadline. Three days later, she defeated Mandy Rose to win the NXT Women's Championship. In January 2023, Perez entered her first Royal Rumble match at the titular event. At Vengeance Day, Perez retained the title against Dolin and Jayne in a triple threat match. She then defended her title against Meiko Satomura at Roadblock. At Stand & Deliver, she lost the title to Indi Hartwell in a ladder match involving Dolin, Zoey Stark, Stratton, and Lyra Valkyria, ending her reign at 109 days. Perez failed to regain the title at Spring Breakin'.

On the January 16, 2024, episode of NXT, Perez won a women's contender battle royal to face NXT Women's Champion Lyra Valkyria for the title at Vengeance Day. At Vengeance Day, Perez was defeated by Valkyria. During the match, Lola Vice cashed in her Breakout Tournament contract, thus making the match a triple threat. At Roadblock, Perez attacked Valkyria and turned heel. At Stand & Deliver, Perez defeated Valkyria to win the title. She became the youngest two-time NXT Women's Champion. At Spring Breakin' Week One, Perez defeated Valkyria and Tatum Paxley in a triple threat match to retain the title. On the May 28 episode of NXT, TNA Knockouts World Champion Jordynne Grace made a surprise appearance and challenged for Perez's title at Battleground where Perez retained the title. She then defended her title against Vice at Heatwave and Thea Hail at Week 1 of The Great American Bash. At No Mercy, Perez retained the title against Jaida Parker. After the match, she was confronted by the debuting Giulia. On the special episode NXT CW premiere, Perez defeated Giulia in a title match after interference from the returning Cora Jade.

In January 2025, Perez lost the title to Giulia in a rematch at New Year's Evil, ending her second reign at 276 days. At Royal Rumble, Perez set the record for the longest time spent in a women's Royal Rumble match at 1 hour, 7 minutes and 45 second; she entered at number 3 and finished as the runner up, last eliminated by Charlotte Flair. At Vengeance Day, Perez failed to regain her title in a fatal four-way match against the champion Giulia, Bayley, and Jade. Perez then qualified for the Elimination Chamber match by defeating Raquel Rodriguez on the February 17 episode of Raw. At the event, she was eliminated by Alexa Bliss. Perez's last match on NXT was on the April 29 episode.

==== The Judgment Day (2025–present) ====
After several main roster appearances in early 2025, Perez joined the Raw brand on May 19, and she qualified for Money in the Bank ladder match by defeating Becky Lynch and Natalya in a triple threat match on the same date episode of Raw. At the titular event, she failed to win the match. Perez then participated in 2025 Queen of the Ring tournament, winning the first round and losing in the semifinals. On the June 30 episode of Raw, Perez joined the Judgment Day and officially replaced the injured Liv Morgan as one-half of the WWE Women's Tag Team Champions with Raquel Rodriguez. They then defended their titles in a fatal four-way tag team match against the Kabuki Warriors (Asuka and Kairi Sane), Alexa Bliss and Charlotte Flair, and Sol Ruca and Zaria at Evolution. On Night 1 of SummerSlam, Perez and Rodriguez lost the titles to Flair and Bliss, ending their reign at 33 days.

In February 2026, Perez revealed on TikTok that she underwent a surgery to remove a neoplasm from her back. After her return, she participated in the Queen of the Ring tournament, and she was eliminated by Iyo Sky in the first round. On the September 21 episode of Raw, Perez defeated La Catalina and Sky to qualify for the 2026 Money in the Bank ladder match. At the event, she failed to win the match.

== Professional wrestling style and persona ==
Gonzalez cited AJ Lee, Bayley, Paige, and the Rock as her inspirations; her ring name Rok-C derived from the latter and her real name Carla. Her finisher is a sunset flip powerbomb named Pop Rox. Eddie Guerrero, CM Punk, Alexa Bliss, and Lee are the inspirations for her heel persona. Gonzalez noted that her match with Meiko Satomura was a dream match for her. She credited Maria Kanellis, Bobby Cruise, and her time in Ring of Honor (ROH) with getting her ready for WWE.

== Other media ==
=== Video games ===
Year	Title	Notes	Ref.
2023	WWE 2K23	Video game debut	
2024	WWE 2K24	—N/a	
2025	WWE 2K25	—N/a	
2026	WWE 2K26	—N/a	

== Personal life ==
Gonzalez was born to a Puerto Rican father and a Mexican mother, and she identifies herself as Latina. Speaking with BT Sport in December 2022, she mentioned that wrestling helped her dealing with anxiety and depression. In an interview with Metro.co.uk in May 2023, Gonzalez explained that she always wanted to bring the subject of mental health to wrestling and shared her thoughts about it. Gonzalez is a Alexander High School alumna. She is in a relationship with professional wrestler Beau Morris, better known by his ring name Drake Moreaux.

== Championships and accomplishments ==
- ESPN
  - Women's Wrestler of the Year (2024) – tied with Toni Storm
  - Ranked No. 9 of the 30 best pro wrestlers under 30 (2025)
- Mission Pro Wrestling
  - MPW Awards (3 times)
    - Wrestler of the Year for MPW (2019)
    - Match of the Year for MPW (2019)
    - Moment of the Year for MPW (2019)
- New Texas Pro Wrestling
  - New Texas Pro Women's Championship (1 time)
- Pro Wrestling Illustrated
  - Ranked No. 11 of the top 250 female wrestlers in the PWI Women's 250 (2024)
- Renegade Wrestling Revolution
  - RWR Vixens Champion (1 time)
- Ring of Honor
  - ROH Women's World Championship (1 time, inaugural)
  - ROH Women's World Championship Tournament (2021)
  - ROH Year-End Award (2 times)
    - Female Wrestler of the Year (2021)
    - Best New Star (2021)
- Reality of Wrestling
  - ROW Diamonds Division Championship (1 time)
- Sabotage Wrestling
  - Sabotage War of the Genders Championship (1 time)
- WWE
  - WWE Women's Tag Team Championship (1 time) – with Raquel Rodriguez
  - NXT Women's Championship (2 times)
  - NXT Women's Tag Team Championship (1 time) – with Cora Jade
  - NXT Women's Breakout Tournament (2022)
  - Women's Iron Survivor Challenge (2022)
  - Slammy Award (1 time)
    - NXT Superstar of the Year (2025)
  - NXT Year-End Award (1 time)
    - Female Superstar of the Year (2024)
