= Tony Deppen =

American professional wrestler (born 1988)

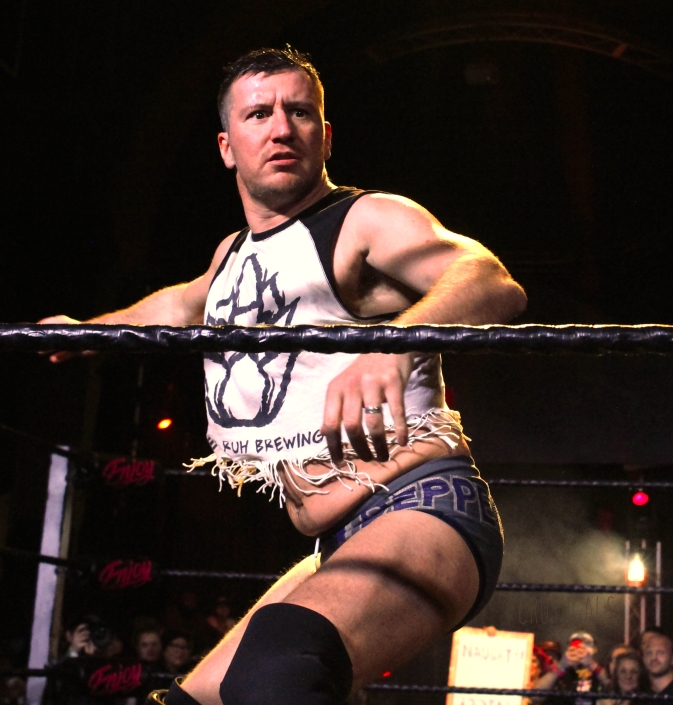
- Tony Deppen at Enjoy Wrestling, December 2024

Personal information
- Born: May 3, 1988 (age 38) Shamokin, Pennsylvania, U.S.

Professional wrestling career
- Ring name(s): Stokely Hathaway Jr. Tony Deppen
- Billed weight: 175 lb (79 kg)
- Trained by: Aaron Arbo; Andy Harner; Ethan Lindermuth
- Debut: 2009

Anthony Deppen (born May 3, 1988) is an American professional wrestler currently working on the independent circuit. He is best known as tenure Major League Wrestling (MLW) and Ring of Honor (ROH), where he is a former one-time ROH World Television Champion.

== Professional wrestling career ==
=== Chikara (2018–2019) ===
Deppen is known for his tenure with Chikara, promotion for which he made his first appearance at CHIKARA National Pro Wrestling Day 2018 from February 17, where he unsuccessfully challenged The Whisper for the Chikara Young Lions Cup. He continued to wrestle for Chikara as part of the FIST stable, having Travis Huckabee as a tag team partner, both competing on house shows such as the CHIKARA Chikarasaurus Rex: A Deadly Secret from August 11, 2018, where they defeated The Colony (Green Ant and Thief Ant), The Creatures Of The Deep (Cajun Crawdad and Hermit Crab), and Xyberhawx2000 (Nytehawk and Razerhawk). Other notable appearances made by Deppen are at the King of Trios tournament of the promotion. At the 2018 edition of the event, he teamed up with fellow FIST stablemates Icarus and Travis Huckabee, defeating Galactic Wildlife Commission (ThunderFrog, Air Wolf, and Wildcat) in the first-round match, but later fell short to The ResistANTce (Fire Ant, Green Ant [II], and Thief Ant) in the quarter-finals. One year later at the 2019 edition of the event, he teamed up again with Icarus and Huckabee and defeated The Embassy (Prince Nana, Jimmy Rave, and Sal Rinauro) in the first-round, The Carnies (Nick Iggy, Kerry Awful, and Tripp Cassidy) in the quarter-finals, but stopped in the semi-finals where they got defeated by The Nations (Mick Moretti, Jack Bonza, and Adam Hoffman). At CHIKARA Fright Knight on April 27, 2019, Deppen teamed up with Travis Huckabee and defeated Princess KimberLee and The Whisper to win the Chikara Campeonatos de Parejas.

=== Combat Zone Wrestling (2016–2017) ===
Deppen worked for Combat Zone Wrestling for a brief period of time, making his first appearance at CZW Down With The Sickness 2016 on September 10, where he scored a victory against Anthony Henry, Ryan Taylor and Joey Lynch in a four-way match. One month later at CZW Tangled Web 9, a show which took place on October 8, 2016, he unsuccessfully challenged Joey Janela for the CZW Wired Championship. Deppen continued to compete in CZW's pay-per-views such as CZW Cage of Death 18 from December 10, 2016, where he fell short to Dave Crist, A. R. Fox, Zachary Wentz, Tim Donst, Alexander James and Jimmy Lloyd in a six-man scramble match. At CZW Best of the Best 16 on April 1, 2017, he took part in an Ultimate opportunity eight-man match, coming short to Rickey Shane Page defeated Ace Austin, Alexander James, Caleb Konley, Ethan Case, Flip Gordon and Mascarita Dorada.

=== Game Changer Wrestling (2016–present) ===
Deppen is also currently working for Game Changer Wrestling. At GCW Worst Behavior on October 28, 2017, he defeated Eli Everfly, Smiley and Zenshi in a four-way match to win the GCW Extreme Championship. He participated at Joey Janela's Spring Break 2018, an event created and promoted by Joey Janela on April 6, 2018, where he unsuccessfully faced Eli Everfly, DJ Z, Gringo Loco, Kyle The Beast and Teddy Hart in a six-way match. At Joey Janela's Spring Break 3 Part 2, Deppen participated in a 72-man battle royal also involving other popular superstars such as A-Kid, Australian Suicide, Homicide, Jake Atlas, JTG, Shad Gaspard, Tracy Smothers and others. At GCW Crushed Up on June 20, 2019, he unsuccessfully faced Nick Gage for the GCW World Championship.

=== Ring of Honor (2020–2021) ===
Deppen made his debut in Ring Of Honor at ROH Wrestling #472 from October 2, 2020, in a ROH Pure Championship tournament first-round match in which he fell short to P. J. Black. He continued to make sporadic appearances for the promotion, such as at ROH Wrestling #476 where he competed in a three-way dark match against Dak Draper and Wheeler Yuta. At Final Battle 2020 from December 10, he defeated LSG, Josh Woods and Dak Draper in a four-way match to earn a shot at the ROH World Television Championship. Later that night, he unsuccessfully challenged Dragon Lee for the title. On March 12, 2021, at ROH Wrestling #495, Deppen pulled out an upset victory against Kenny King. At ROH Wrestling #502, a show which aired on May 1, 2021, Deppen defeated Tracy Williams to win the ROH World Television Championship, although the exact date the match took place is unknown due to ROH holding closed door tapings at the UMBC Event Center since August 2020, after resuming operations following a five-month hiatus due to the COVID-19 pandemic.

== Championships and accomplishments ==
- Chikara
  - Chikara Campeonatos de Parejas (1 time) - with Travis Huckabee
- DDT Pro Wrestling
  - Ironman Heavymetalweight Championship (1 time)
- Game Changer Wrestling
  - GCW Extreme Championship (1 time)
  - WOMBAT Television Championship (1 time)
- On Point Wrestling
  - OPW Heavyweight Championship (1 time)
- Pro Wrestling Illustrated
  - Ranked No. 64 of the top 500 singles wrestlers in the PWI 500 in 2021
- Ring Of Honor
  - ROH World Television Championship (1 time)
- TRUE Wrestling
  - TRUE Championship (1 time)
