= Josh Woods (wrestler) =

American professional wrestler (born 1988)

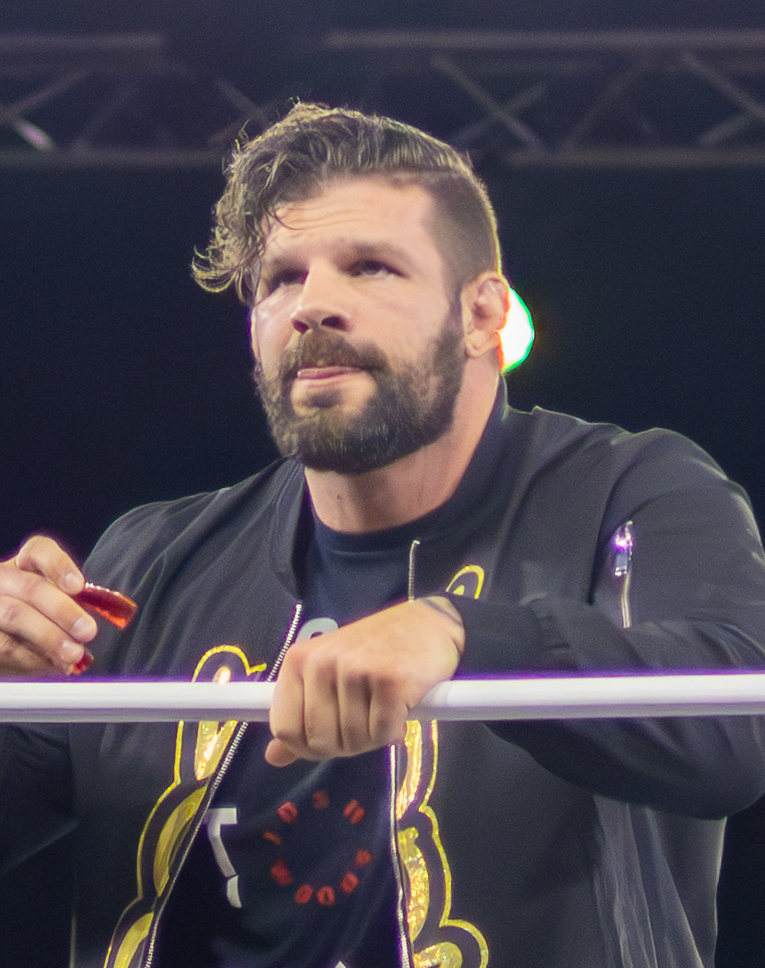
- Woods in September 2025

Personal information
- Born: Joshua Aaron Woods; March 20, 1988 (age 38) Dallas, Texas, U.S.
- Education: University of Central Florida

Professional wrestling career
- Ring name(s): Josh Woods; Preston Cunningham Jr.
- Billed height: 6 ft 0 in (1.83 m)
- Billed weight: 233 lb (106 kg)
- Trained by: Silas Young; WWE Performance Center; Ring of Honor
- Debut: August 25, 2015

Joshua Aaron Woods (born March 20, 1988) is an American professional wrestler, He is signed to Ring of Honor (ROH) and All Elite Wrestling (AEW), where he performs under his real name (stylized as Josh Woods) and member of The Premier Athletes stable.

== Amateur wrestling career ==
Woods was a collegiate amateur wrestler at the University of Central Florida, where, in 2011, he won the NCWA National Championship. He was also a two time NCWA All American and National Runner-up. He also runs camps for Ultimate Fighting Championship athletes such as Alex Nicholson, Seth Petruzelli, Mike Perry and Tom Lawlor.

== Professional wrestling career ==
=== WWE (2014–2016) ===
Woods signed a contract with WWE at the end of 2014 and started to train at the WWE Performance Center. His first match with NXT was on April 25, where he competed in a battle royal. On July 30 and September 26, he competed in two more battle royals to determine the number one contender to the NXT Championship, which were won by Tyler Breeze and Baron Corbin, respectively. His first win was at Venice, Florida during a house show on January 30, 2016, against Gzim Selmani. On June 9, he competed against No Way Jose in a losing effort. His final match in NXT was at a house show on July 23, where he lost to Mojo Rawley. WWE released him days later.

=== Ring of Honor (2016–present) ===
Woods' debut in Ring of Honor was in a dark match on October 22, 2016, in a six-man tag team match alongside Brandon Groom and Kennedy Kendrick, defeating Chuckles, Joey Osbourne and Victor Andrews. He entered the 2017 ROH Top Prospect Tournament, defeating Chris LeRusso, Brian Milonas, and John Skyler to win the tournament. He formed a tag team with Silas Young called Two Guys & One Tag. On March 26, 2021, on ROH 19th Anniversary Show, Young turned on Woods splitting up the team. At Death Before Dishonor XVIII, Woods defeated ROH Pure Champion Jonathan Gresham to win the title.

With the acquisition of Ring of Honor by Tony Khan, it was announced that Woods would defend the Pure Championship against Wheeler Yuta at Supercard of Honor XV on April 1, 2022. Woods lost the title to Yuta at the event.

=== Independent circuit (2017) ===
On July 14, 2017, he entered the MCW Shane Shamrock Memorial XVII tournament, where he fought Anthony Henry to a time limit draw.

=== All Elite Wrestling (2021–present) ===
On December 12, 2021, Woods made his debut for All Elite Wrestling (AEW) on AEW Dark, where he was defeated by Shawn Spears. After racking up some victories on Dark programming, Woods began appearing on Dynamite and Rampage in 2022. In the summer, Woods formed a tag team with Tony Nese, and the duo would acquire the services of Mark Sterling as their manager and on-screen attorney. On the August 5 edition of Rampage, Woods & Nese unsuccessfully challenged Swerve in our Glory (Keith Lee & Swerve Strickland) for the AEW World Tag Team Championship. On the October 7 edition of Rampage, Woods & Nese defeated The Varsity Blonds (Brian Pillman Jr. & Griff Garrison), and after the match, Sterling revealed he had "trademarked" the term Varsity as it relates to professional wrestling, and that Woods & Nese would be known as The Varsity Athletes going forward.

== Championships and accomplishments ==
=== Amateur wrestling ===
- National Collegiate Wrestling Association
  - NCWA National Championship – 235 lb (2011)

=== Professional wrestling ===
- Platinum Pro Wrestling
  - PPW Silverweight Championship (1 time)
- Pro Wrestling Illustrated
  - Ranked No. 121 of the top 500 singles wrestlers in the PWI 500 in 2021
- Ring of Honor
  - ROH Pure Championship (1 time)
  - ROH Top Prospect Tournament (2017)
