= ROH Women's World Championship =

Professional wrestling championship

- The ROH Women's World Championship belt (2020–2023)

Details
- Promotion: Ring of Honor
- Date established: January 1, 2020
- Current champion: Athena
- Date won: December 10, 2022

Other names
- ROH Women's World Championship (2020–present); Undisputed ROH Women's World Championship (2022); ROH Women's Championship
Statistics
- First champion: Rok-C
- Most reigns: All titleholders (1)
- Longest reign: Athena (1,443+ days)
- Shortest reign: Deonna Purrazzo (115 days)
- Oldest champion: Mercedes Martinez (41 years, 168 days)
- Youngest champion: Rok-C (19 years, 311 days)
- Heaviest champion: Mercedes Martinez (147 lb (67 kg))
- Lightest champion: Rok-C (115 lb (52 kg))

The ROH Women's World Championship is a women's professional wrestling world championship created and promoted by the American promotion Ring of Honor (ROH). Established on January 1, 2020, the inaugural champion was Rok-C. In addition to being in ROH, the championship is also occasionally defended on All Elite Wrestling's (AEW) programs, as AEW and ROH are both owned by Tony Khan. The current champion is Athena, who is in her first reign, which is the longest reign in the title's history. She won the title by defeating Mercedes Martinez at Final Battle on December 10, 2022.

== History ==
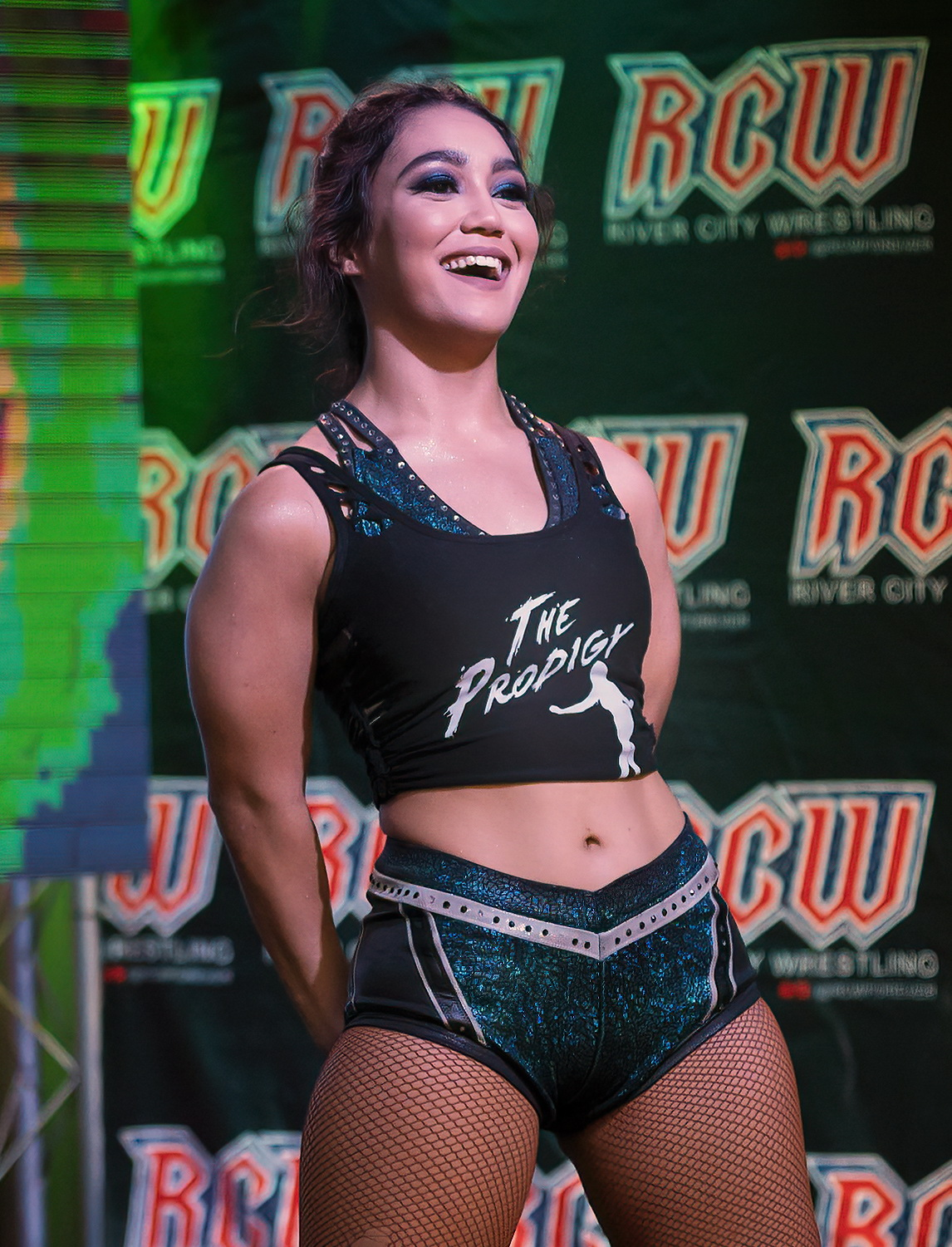
Inaugural champion Rok-C

On January 1, 2020, the ROH Women of Honor World Championship was deactivated when the last champion Kelly Klein was stripped of the championship after ROH didn't renew her contract. A new tournament to crown the inaugural ROH Women's World Champion was set to start on April 24 of that year at Quest for Gold, however, ROH postponed all future events due to the COVID-19 pandemic. (The title replaced the ROH Women of Honor World Title in the ROH Women of Honor division.)

On March 26, 2021, at ROH 19th Anniversary Show, ROH Board of Directors member Maria Kanellis-Bennett announced a tournament to crown a new ROH Women's World Champion. On July 11, at Best in the World, the tournament bracket and the championship itself were revealed.

On September 12, 2021 Rok-C defeated Miranda Alize via pinfall at the ROH pay-per-view Death Before Dishonor XVIII, the culmination of a 15-woman singles elimination tournament to become the inaugural ROH Women's World Championship holder.

On October 27, 2021, Ring of Honor announced that it would go on a hiatus after Final Battle in December, with a return tentatively scheduled for April 2022. All personnel would also be released from their contracts as part of plans to "reimagine" the company as a "fan-focused product". After Final Battle, several ROH wrestlers began to appear on other promotions and defended the titles. Rok-C defended the title against Impact Wrestling's Deonna Purrazzo during a television taping. However, Rok-C was defeated and lost the title to Purrazzo. (Deonna Purrazzo also wrestled in the ROH Women of Honor division throughout years 2015 to 2018 familiar with it.)

In early 2022, during the hiatus, then-ROH Women's World Champion Purrazzo was booked for the Multiverse of Matches at WrestleCon, which happened to be when the Supercard of Honor XV event was later scheduled for April 1, 2022. Purrazzo was unable to attend the latter event. At Supercard of Honor XV, Mercedes Martinez defeated Willow Nightingale to become the Interim ROH Women's World Champion and earned the opportunity to face lineal champion Purrazzo in a unification match at a later date. On the May 4, 2022, episode of Dynamite, Martinez defeated Purrazzo to become the undisputed ROH Women's World Champion. (Prior Mercedes Martinez was also familiar with the ROH Women's division having her first run wrestling in the division throughout years 2006 to 2007 making her a veteran.)

On September 15, 2024 Athena became the longest reigning ROH women's champion & ROH title holder of all time as a woman surpassing Samoa Joe's reign as ROH World Champion at 645 days by holding the ROH Women's World Championship for 646 days. (Prior to her reign Athena also wrestled in the Women of Honor division throughout years 2013 to 2015.)

On October 20, 2024 at Maple Leaf Pro Wrestling’s (MLP) Multi-promotional pay-per-view event Forged in Excellence (Night 2) for the first time ever the title was defended in Canada by Athena as she defeated Gisele Shaw to retain the title.

In January 2025 the title was defended in Japan at World Wonder Ring Stardom by Athena who retained the title while there as she defeated Thekla.

On February 15, 2025 at Global Wars Australia the title was defended in Australia for the first time in history as reigning champion Athena defeated Alex Windsor to retain the title in the shows main event. (The event aired on February 17, 2025.)

Also on February 17, 2025, Athena hit a new landmark as Ring of Honor Women's World Champion, passing the 800-day mark as champion.

On May 29, 2025, Athena hit another milestone as ROH Women's World Champion by hitting 900 days as champion.

On September 5, 2025 Athena hit a fourth Milestone as ROH Women's World Champion by hitting 1000-days as champion.

== Inaugural championship tournament (2021) ==
=== Tournament bracket ===
First Round^{1} ^{2} ROH Wrestling; July 30; August 7 and 14; ROH Women's Division Wednesday; August 4
Rok-C	Pin
Sumie Sakai	9:36
Mandy Leon	7:12
Quinn McKay^{3} ^{4} ^{5}	Pin
Holidead	9:18
Max the Impaler	Pin
Angelina Love	Bye
–^{6}
Alex Gracia	8:43
Miranda Alize	Pin
Mazzerati	8:45
Nicole Savoy	Pin
Willow Nightingale	11:30
Allysin Kay	Sub
Marti Belle	7:13
Trish Adora	Sub

Quarterfinals; ROH Wrestling; August 21 and 28
Rok-C	Pin
Quinn McKay	10:14
Max the Impaler	5:53
Angelina Love	DQ
Miranda Alize	Pin
Nicole Savoy	13:04
Allysin Kay	13:30
Trish Adora	Pin

Semifinals; ROH Wrestling; September 4
Rok-C	Sub
Angelina Love	6:44
Miranda Alize	Sub
Trish Adora	12:16

Final; Death Before Dishonor XVIII; September 12
Rok-C	Pin
Miranda Alize	18:13

1 Participants in the original tournament included: Ashley Vox, Gia Scott, Heather Monroe, Jenny Rose, Katarina, Kellyanne, Lindsay Snow, Maria Manic, Session Moth Martina, and Tasha Steelz.
2 Brandi Lauren and Laynie Luck were named as alternates.
3 Spot was originally meant for Vita VonStarr, but her interference in matches involving The Righteous got her removed.
4 Allie Recks was slated to take VonStarr's place in the tournament, but a knee injury kept her from competing.
5 Chelsea Green was slated to take VonStarr's place in the tournament, but a broken wrist kept her from competing.
6 Love defeated Quinn McKay on the May 8 ROH Wrestling episode to earn a bye.

== Belt designs ==
The original design of the championship used from 2020 to 2023

The first ROH Women's World title design (2020–2023) is similar to the 2017 to 2022 design of the ROH World Championship separating itself from the men's version of the design with the word women's above in the middle center plate and also with the title being smaller than the 2017 to 2022 design of the ROH World Championship belt design due to it being a women's title (The original design of the ROH Women's World title is gold with silver ROH Logos indented in the center and indented on side plates).

On March 31, 2023, a new design of the belt was revealed at Supercard of Honor, thus making it the second design of the championship belt. The design of the belt kept the original design of the previous design but now featuring silver plates and the updated Ring of Honor logo on the main plate and side plates. On the October 24, 2024, episode of ROH Wrestling, Athena was gifted a modified spinner version of the championship belt to celebrate her record setting title reign. During December 20, 2024, Athena also returned the 2023 version of the belt design carrying both at the same time, even down to the ring.

== Reigns ==
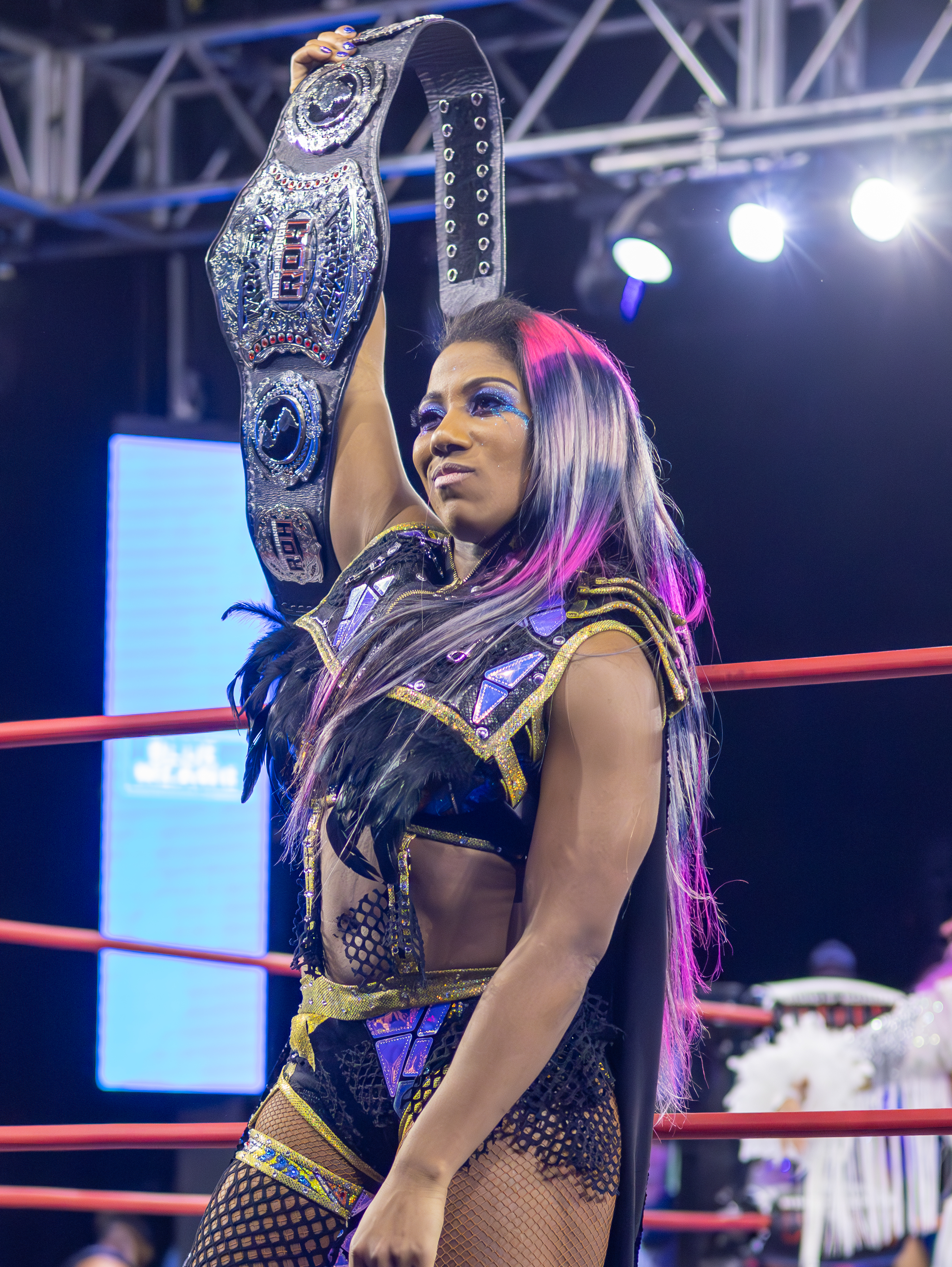
Current and longest reigning champion Athena with the second (2023–present) design of the championship.

As of November 22, 2026, there have been four reigns between four champions. Rok-C was the inaugural champion. Athena's reign is the longest at 1,443+ days, while Deonna Purrazzo has the shortest reign at 115 days. Mercedes Martinez is the oldest champion at 41 years old, while Rok-C is the youngest champion at 19 years old.

Athena is the current champion in her first reign. She won the title by defeating Martinez at Final Battle on December 10, 2022, in Arlington, Texas.

=== Names ===
Name	Years
ROH Women's World Championship	January 1, 2020 – May 4, 2022; May 4, 2022 – present
Undisputed ROH Women's World Championship	May 4, 2022

Key
No.	Overall reign number
Reign	Reign number for the specific champion
Days	Number of days held
+	Current reign is changing daily

No.	Champion	Championship change			Reign statistics		Notes	Ref.
No.	Champion	Date	Event	Location	Reign	Days	Notes	Ref.
Ring of Honor (ROH)
1	Rok-C	September 12, 2021	Death Before Dishonor XVIII	Philadelphia, PA	1	119	Defeated Miranda Alize in the finals of a 15-woman single-elimination tournament to become the inaugural champion.	
2	Deonna Purrazzo	January 9, 2022	Impact!	Dallas, TX	1	115	This was a Winner Takes All match, also for Purrazzo's AAA Reina de Reinas Championship. This was an Impact Wrestling event that aired on tape delay on January 13, 2022. During this reign, Tony Khan purchased Ring of Honor.	
—	Mercedes Martinez (Interim)	April 1, 2022	Supercard of Honor XV	Garland, TX	—	33	Deonna Purrazzo was unable to defend the title at Supercard of Honor. Martinez defeated Willow Nightingale to determine an interim champion.	
3	Mercedes Martinez	May 4, 2022	Dynamite	Baltimore, MD	1	220	Defeated Deonna Purrazzo to become Undisputed ROH Women's World Champion. This was an All Elite Wrestling event.	
4	Athena	December 10, 2022	Final Battle	Arlington, TX	1	1,443+		

== See also ==
- World Women's Championship (disambiguation)
