= Ring of Honor =

American professional wrestling promotion

ROH Acquisition Co, LLC
- ROH logo used since 2022
- Trade name: Ring of Honor
- Type: Private
- Industry: Professional wrestling Streaming media
- Founded: February 23, 2002; 24 years ago in Philadelphia, Pennsylvania, U.S.
- Founder: Rob Feinstein
- Headquarters: 1 Tower Court, Suite 402, Jacksonville, Florida, U.S.
- Area served: Worldwide
- Key people: Tony Khan (President); Cary Silkin (Ambassador)
- Products: Television; Live events Pay-per-view; Merchandise; Home video Video-on-demand; Streaming network service
- Owner: Tony Khan
- Parent: RF Video (2002–2004); Sinclair Broadcast Group (2011–2022)
- Divisions: Honor Club
- Website: ringofhonor.com

Ring of Honor (ROH) is an American professional wrestling promotion based in Jacksonville, Florida. It was founded by former professional Rob Feinstein on February 23, 2002 and operated by promoter Cary Silkin from 2004 until 2011; the promotion was subsequently sold to the Sinclair Broadcast Group, and then sold to Tony Khan.

Throughout the 2010s, ROH was considered the third largest wrestling promotion in the United States, behind WWE and Total Nonstop Action Wrestling, initially operating on an internet distribution model. Under Sinclair's ownership, ROH began talent-sharing deals with wrestling companies outside the United States, expanded their television visibility through Sinclair's broadcast stations, and eventually established its own streaming service in 2018 called Honor Club.

As Sinclair was struggling with debt in the late 2010s, ROH went on a hiatus at the end of 2021. In March 2022, the promotion was sold to Khan, also the co-owner of All Elite Wrestling (AEW). The sale completed in May 2022, and ROH began to operate as a sister promotion to AEW.

== History ==
=== 2002–2011: Formation and early years ===
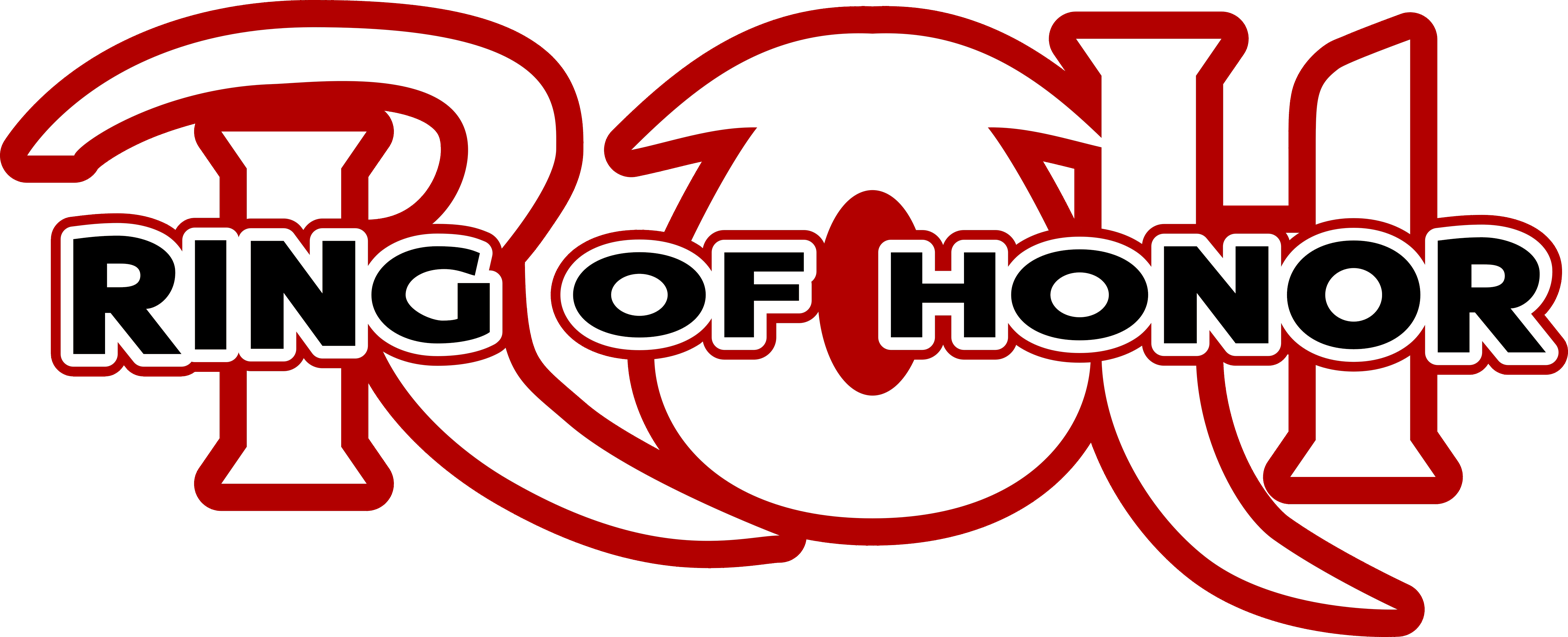
The first logo of the company, used between 2002 and 2004, designed by Michael Paris (now known as Joaquin Wilde in WWE)

The second logo of the company, used between 2004 and 2011.

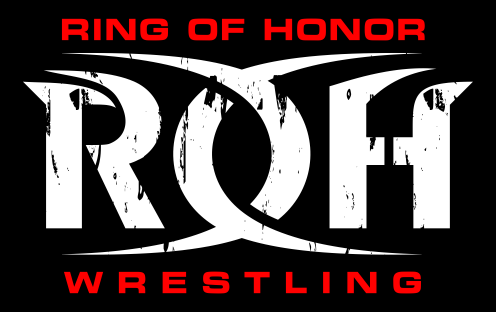
The third logo of the company, used between 2011 and 2022

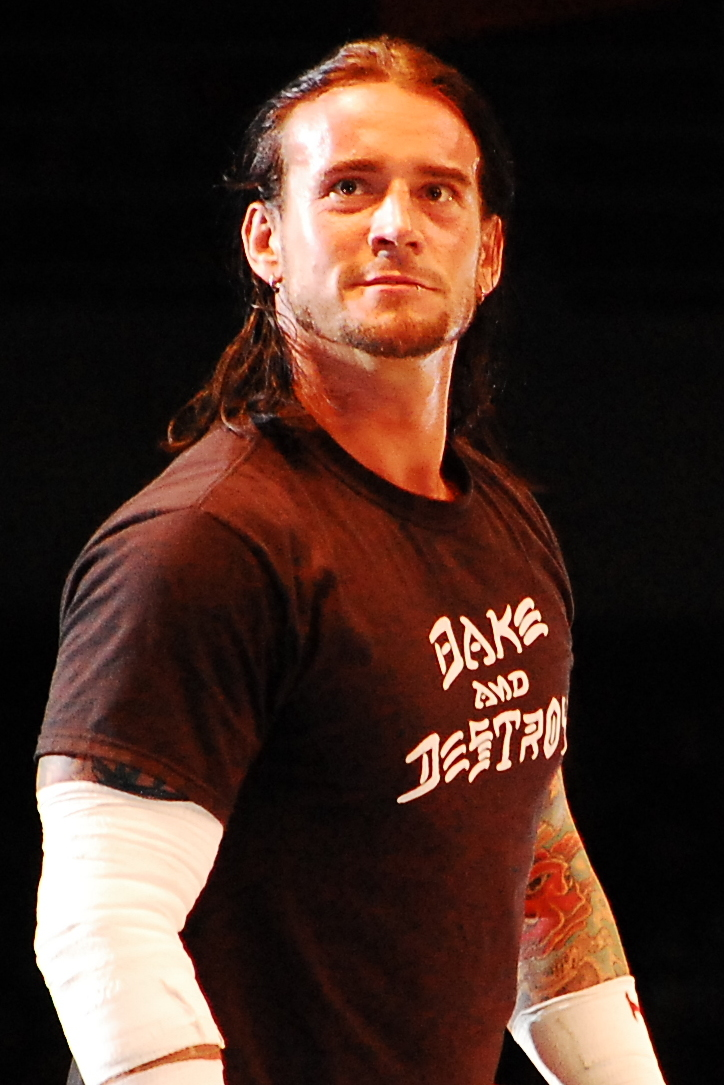
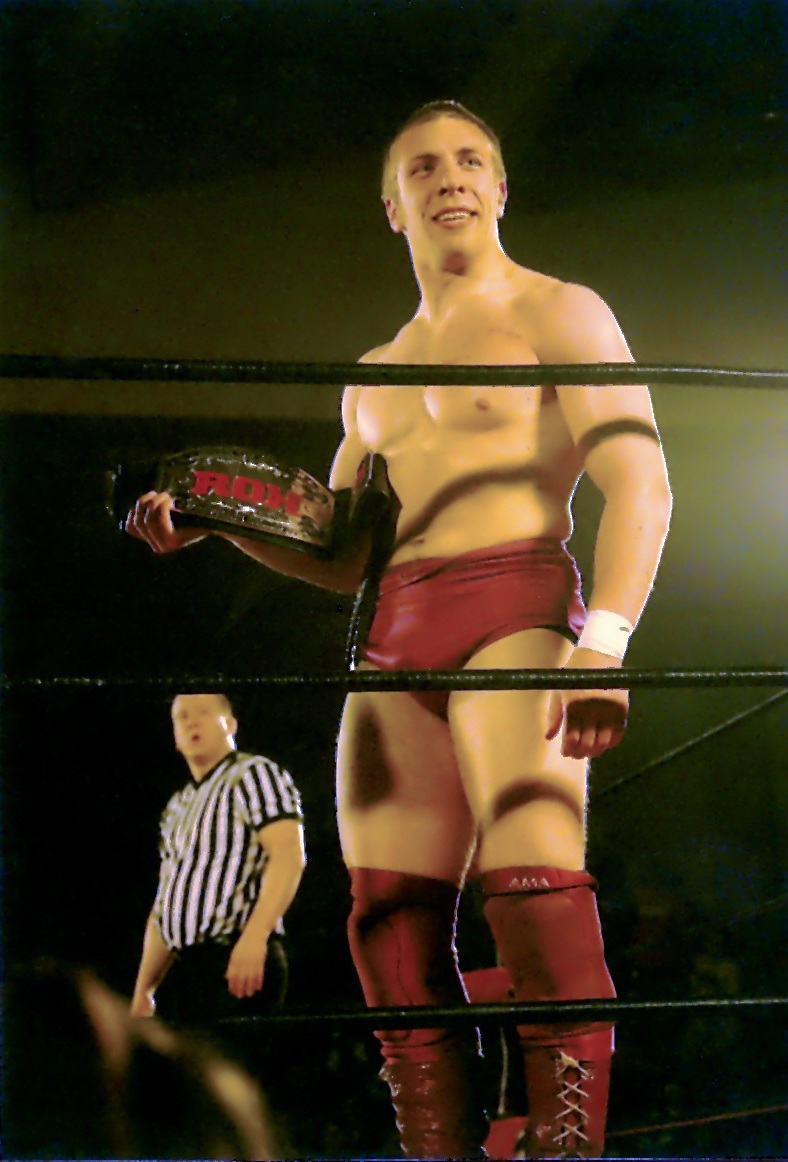
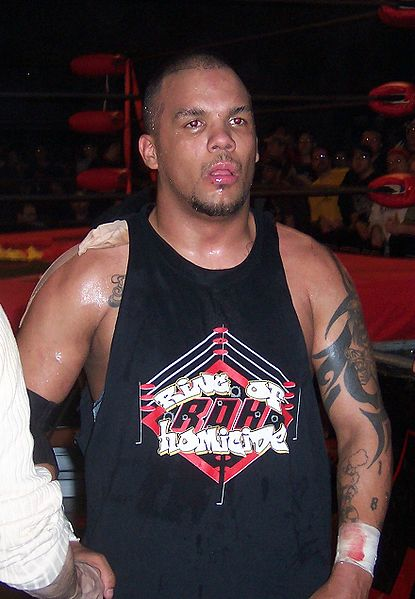
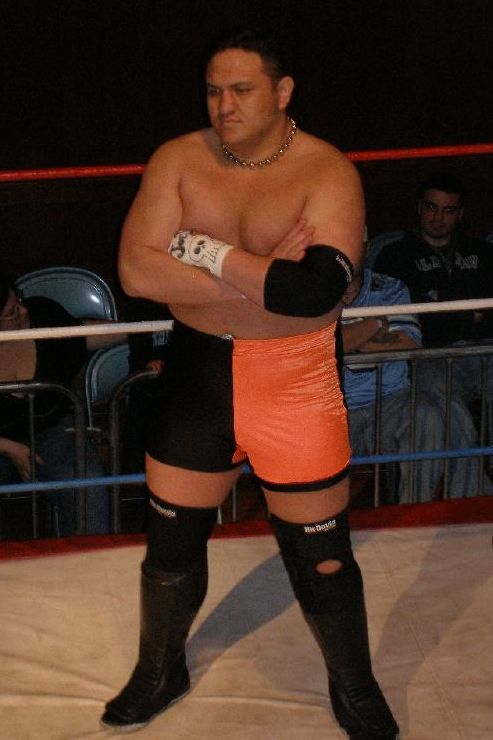
The formative years of Ring of Honor saw the likes of CM Punk, Bryan Danielson, Homicide and Samoa Joe each become ROH World Champion.

In April 2001, the pro wrestling video-distribution company RF Video needed a new promotion to lead its video sales when its best-seller – Extreme Championship Wrestling (ECW) – went out of business and WWE purchased its assets. RF Video also videotaped events held by other, less-popular, regional wrestling promotions; it sold these through its catalog and website. After months of trying to join Combat Zone Wrestling (CZW), RF Video's owner, Rob Feinstein, decided to fill the ECW void by starting his own pro wrestling promotion, and distributing its made-for-DVD/VHS productions exclusively through RF Video.

The first event, titled The Era of Honor Begins, took place on February 23, 2002, in Philadelphia, the former home area of ECW. It featured nine matches, including a match between Eddy Guerrero and Super Crazy for the IWA Intercontinental Heavyweight Championship and a triple threat match between Christopher Daniels, Bryan Danielson, and Low Ki (who would become known as the "founding fathers of ROH"). In its first year of operation, Ring of Honor confined itself to staging live events in a limited number of venues and cities – primarily in the northeastern United States. Ten shows ran in Philadelphia, two in Wakefield, Massachusetts; one in metro Pittsburgh, Pennsylvania; and, one in Queens, New York.

In 2003, ROH expanded to other areas of the United States, including Ohio, New Jersey, Connecticut, and Maryland. In Florida, ROH supported Full Impact Pro, which would serve as a sister promotion until 2009. It also began to build its international identity by co-promoting an event with Frontier Wrestling Alliance in London, England on May 17, 2003.

In 2004, Feinstein was caught in an internet-based sting operation, in which he allegedly tried to solicit sex on the internet from a person that he thought to be an underage boy (but was actually an adult, posing as a minor). After this was publicized by some news outlets, Feinstein resigned from ROH in March 2004.

In the aftermath of the scandal, Total Nonstop Action Wrestling (TNA) ended its talent-sharing agreement with Ring of Honor, abruptly withdrawing all of its contracted wrestlers from their prior commitments to perform in ROH shows—including major ROH draws A.J. Styles and Christopher Daniels, who held and were about to hold ROH championships, respectively. Doug Gentry eventually bought Feinstein's stake in ROH, and later sold it to Cary Silkin. ROH then started its own mail-order and online store operations, which sold DVDs of its live events, plus shoot interviews (dubbed The Straight Shootin' Series) with wrestlers and managers, DVDs of SHIMMER (which would serve as a second sister promotion from 2005 to 2010) and even some merchandise from competitors, such as Pro Wrestling Guerrilla. Under Silkin, ROH branched out across the world.

On January 23, 2007, ROH announced plans for a Japanese tour, resulting in a show on July 16 in Tokyo called "Live In Tokyo", co-promoted with Pro Wrestling Noah and a show on July 17 called "Live In Osaka" in Osaka co-promoted with Dragon Gate.

On May 2, 2007, Ring of Honor announced the signing of a PPV and VOD deal with G-Funk Sports & Entertainment to bring ROH into homes with In Demand Networks, TVN, and the Dish Network. The deal called for six taped pay-per-view events to air every 60 days. Because of the move to pay-per-view, TNA Wrestling immediately pulled its contracted stars (Austin Aries, Christopher Daniels, and Homicide) from ROH shows. The first pay-per-view, titled "Respect is Earned", taped on May 12, first aired on July 1 on Dish Network.

Ring of Honor continued to expand throughout 2008, debuting in Orlando, Florida on March 28 for Dragon Gate Challenge II, in Manassas, Virginia on May 9 for Southern Navigation and in Toronto, Ontario on July 25 for Northern Navigation. On May 10, 2008, Ring of Honor set an attendance record in its debut show, A New Level, from the Hammerstein Ballroom in the Manhattan Center in New York City. It had plans for shows in St. Louis, Missouri, Nashville, Tennessee, and Montreal before the end of 2008. On October 26, 2008, the company announced the departure of head booker Gabe Sapolsky, and his replacement by Adam Pearce.

On January 26, 2009, Ring of Honor announced that it had signed an agreement with HDNet Fights for a weekly television program. The first tapings for Ring of Honor Wrestling took place on February 28 and March 1, 2009, at The Arena in Philadelphia, Pennsylvania, and series premiered on HDNet on March 21, 2009. After nearly a year of producing weekly television broadcasts, RoH announced on January 20, 2010, that it would commission a new title, the ROH World Television Championship, to be decided in an eight-man tournament beginning February 5, 2010, and ending February 6, 2010, on its Ring of Honor Wrestling program. Due to a blizzard, however, the second half of the tournament did not take place until March 5, 2010, when Eddie Edwards defeated Davey Richards in the finals.

On August 15, 2010, Ring of Honor fired head booker Adam Pearce and replaced him with Hunter Johnston, who wrestles for the company under the ring name Delirious. On September 8, 2010, Ring of Honor and Ohio Valley Wrestling announced a working relationship between the two companies.

On January 11, 2011, Ring of Honor announced the ending of Ring of Honor Wrestling, after the completion of the promotion's two-year contract with HDNet. The final tapings of the show would be taking place on January 21 and 22, with the final episode airing on April 4, 2011.

=== 2011–2019: Acquisition by Sinclair and expansion ===
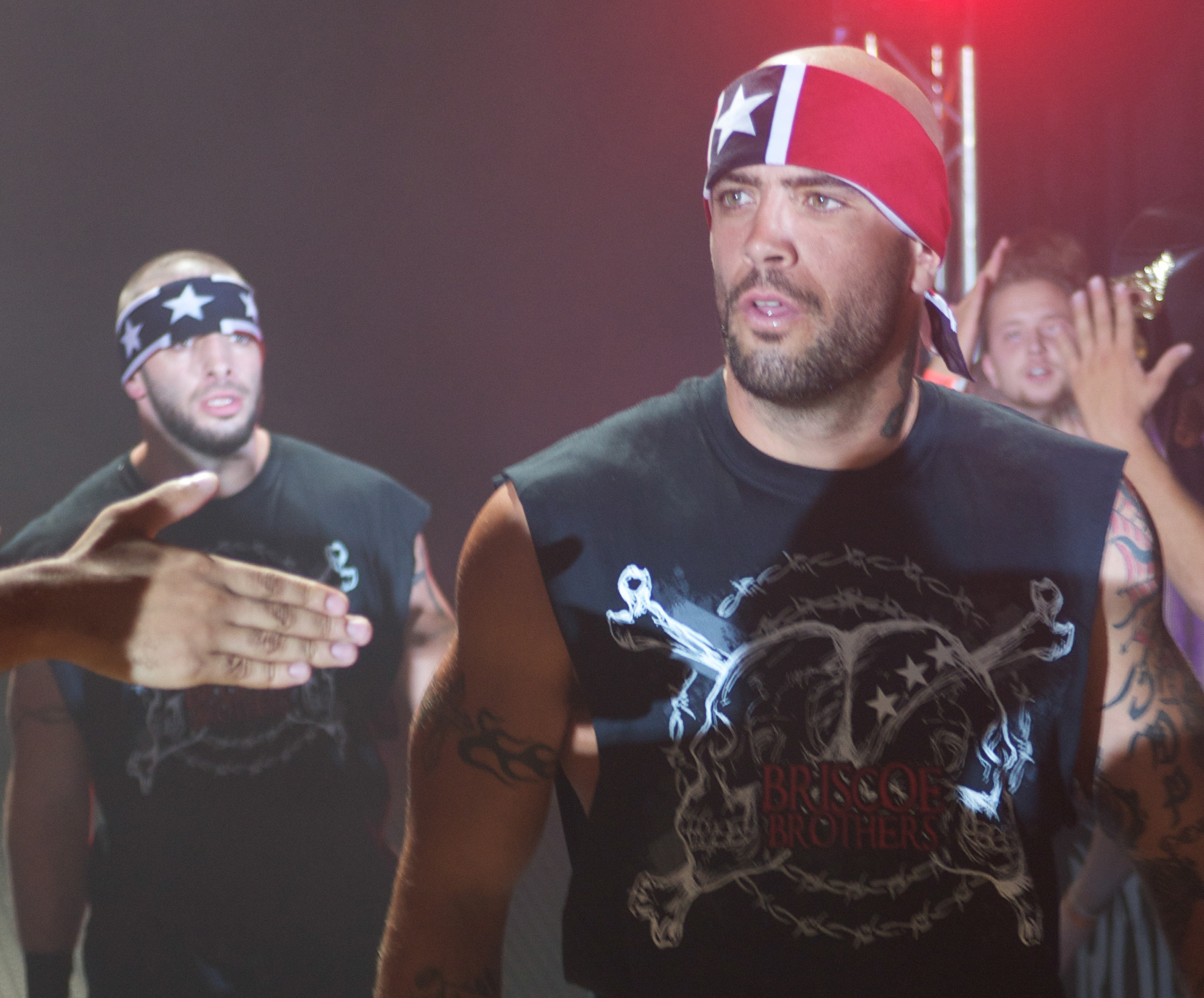
The Briscoe Brothers, Mark and Jay, wrestled primarily for ROH for 20 years and as a duo were stalwarts of the company.

On May 21, 2011, Ring of Honor and Sinclair Broadcast Group announced that the broadcast carrier had purchased ROH, with former owner Cary Silkin remaining with the company in an executive role. The promotion's programming began airing the weekend of September 24, 2011, with a relaunched Ring of Honor Wrestling airing on several Sinclair owned-or-operated stations; the show aired primarily on Saturday or Sunday afternoons or late nights, or on prime time on some of Sinclair's CW and MyNetworkTV affiliates (as those networks do not run programming on weekend evenings).

On June 22, Ring of Honor held their first live pay-per-view event, Best in the World, from the Nashville State Fairgrounds in Nashville, Tennessee. In September, Sinclair began syndicating ROH to other stations; the first deal was reached with WATL, a Gannett-owned Atlanta station, which began airing ROH on September 13, 2014.

On October 27, 2014, ROH announced a toy licensing deal with Figures Toy Company, which would see the distribution of action figures based on the Ring of Honor wrestlers, replica title belts and more.

On May 27, 2015, ROH announced a 26-week television deal with Destination America, beginning on June 3.

On December 13, 2015, ROH announced a partnership with Southern California promotion Pro Wrestling Guerrilla (PWG), which would allow ROH contracted wrestlers to continue working for PWG. On August 30, 2016, ROH announced the creation of a new title, the ROH World Six-Man Tag Team Championship. The inaugural champions were crowned in December.

On November 9, 2017, ROH COO Joe Koff announced that ROH would be developing an OTT streaming service, similar to WWE Network and Impact Wrestling's Global Wrestling Network. The service, Honor Club, would be unveiled on February 2, 2018, and launch on February 19. At Final Battle 2017, on December 15, 2017, ROH announced the creation of the Women of Honor Championship, adding its fifth championship and the first for its female roster.

On September 1, 2018, ROH wrestlers Cody Rhodes and The Young Bucks (Matt and Nick Jackson) promoted and wrestled at All In – an event that was produced in collaboration with ROH, featuring wrestlers from numerous promotions that drew over 11,000 fans in suburban Chicago. This was the first American pro wrestling event not promoted by WWE or the defunct World Championship Wrestling (WCW) to reach the 10,000-attendance mark since the 1990s. Also in 2018, ROH and longtime partner New Japan Pro-Wrestling (NJPW) announced a joint event at Madison Square Garden in New York City called G1 Supercard, which was held on April 6, 2019. The event quickly sold out and became the biggest and most attended event in ROH history.

=== 2019–2021: Departures, effects of COVID-19, debt and hiatus ===
In early 2019, Rhodes, the Bucks, and several other talents left the company to start their own promotion – All Elite Wrestling (AEW). The departure of Ring of Honor's top talent for AEW was viewed by many wrestling journalists and commenters as the beginning of a decline for the promotion in 2019. Much of the criticism focused on the reign of then-ROH World Champion Matt Taven. ROH had fewer PPV buys and a reduced live show attendance that year. According to Dave Meltzer, ROH's average live show attendance in 2019 was 1,082—lower than its averages in 2018 and 2017.

In October 2019, ROH producer/road agent Joey Mercury resigned, criticizing ROH for a lack of creative direction as well as having no concussion protocol for wrestlers. Mercury would reveal that ROH allowed then-Women of Honor Champion Kelly Klein to wrestle after suffering a concussion during an October 26, 2019, event. Klein sought medical treatment after suffering post-concussion-syndrome symptoms. She would not be booked for the rest of the year and her contract would expire in December.

In January 2020, Ring of Honor re-signed Marty Scurll; the deal was said to be the most lucrative in ROH history. In addition to being a wrestler, Scurll was also made head booker, working with longtime booker Hunter "Delirious" Johnston. Scurll's deal allowed him to continue to make appearances in New Japan Pro-Wrestling and the National Wrestling Alliance, where he began a cross-promotional feud with NWA World Heavyweight Champion Nick Aldis. However, during the Speaking Out Movement, Scurll was accused of taking advantage of a 16-year-old girl who was inebriated. Scurll would release two statements in which he did not deny the allegations, but claimed the encounter was consensual. On June 25, the promotion announced that they launched an investigation concerning the allegations, and Scurll was removed from his position as booker. By January 2021, Ring of Honor announced that Marty Scurll was no longer under contract after the two parties mutually agreed to part ways.

On January 31, 2020, Ring of Honor announced the return of the ROH Pure Championship, with a tournament to crown the first Pure champion since 2006. The following month, the promotion announced another tournament to crown a new ROH Women's World Championship, following the deactivation of the Women of Honor World Championship title. However, in response to the 2020 COVID-19 pandemic, Ring of Honor would postpone live events beginning in March.

Television tapings for Ring of Honor Wrestling would resume in August at the Chesapeake Employers Insurance Arena (formerly known as the UMBC Event Center) from the promotion's homebase in Maryland but without fans in attendance. New episodes would begin syndication on September 12, with a revamped format, and the beginning of the Pure title tournament. Ten days prior, Ring of Honor launched a Free ad-supported television (FAST) channel on the Sinclair-owned streaming service Stirr called "ROH Best On The Planet". Final Battle would be the promotion's sole pay-per-view event in 2020, while live audiences would return on July 11, 2021, at Best in the World.

It was revealed during their 2021 Q3 financial results that Sinclair had US$12,530,000 in debt, largely due to the Diamond Sports Group (the subsidiary that operates the Bally Sports networks). On October 27, 2021, Ring of Honor announced that it would go on a hiatus after Final Battle in December, with a return tentatively scheduled for April 2022. All personnel would also be released from their contracts as part of plans to "reimagine" the company as a "fan-focused product". In the interim, the men's and woman's championships were defended at events held by various other promotions, including Impact Wrestling and Jonathan Gresham's new Terminus promotion.

=== 2022–present: Acquisition by Tony Khan ===
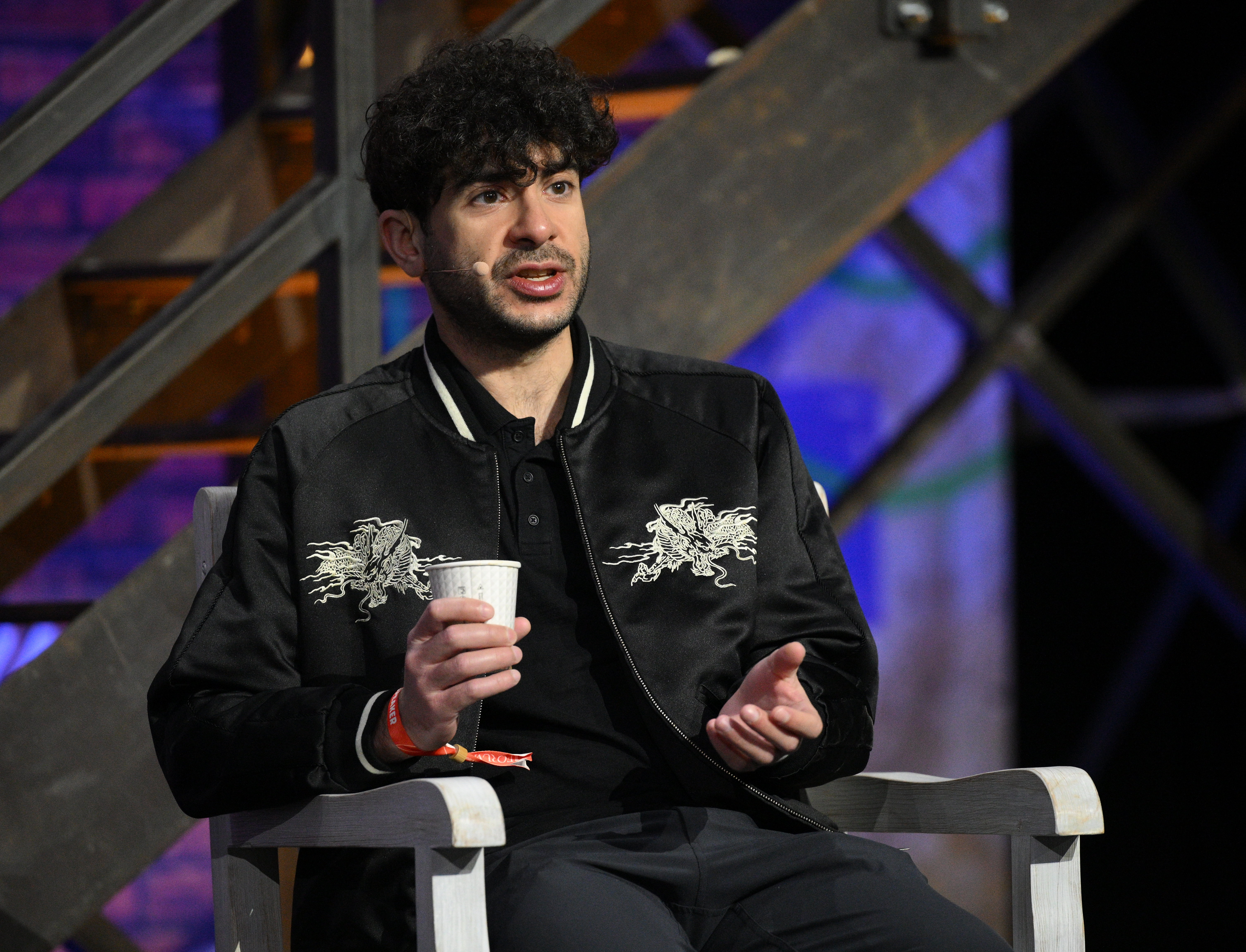
Tony Khan became the owner of ROH in March 2022.

On January 10, 2022, ROH announced that Supercard of Honor XV would take place at the Curtis Culwell Center in Garland, Texas, on April 1. These matches were also seen on Ring of Honor Wrestling. In addition, it was reported that Ring of Honor would operate "like an indie", using non-contracted talent.

On the March 2 episode of All Elite Wrestling's live weekly series Dynamite, president and co-founder Tony Khan announced that he had purchased Ring of Honor from Sinclair Broadcast Group, including its brand assets, intellectual property, and video library. Khan also announced that he intends to make the ROH library available to the public in its entirety. It was clarified through a press release issued that night that the acquisition was made through an entity separate from AEW and fully owned by Khan. In a media scrum following AEW's Revolution PPV on March 6, Khan revealed that he eventually planned to run ROH separately from AEW, and also indicated that ROH could be used as a developmental brand for AEW.

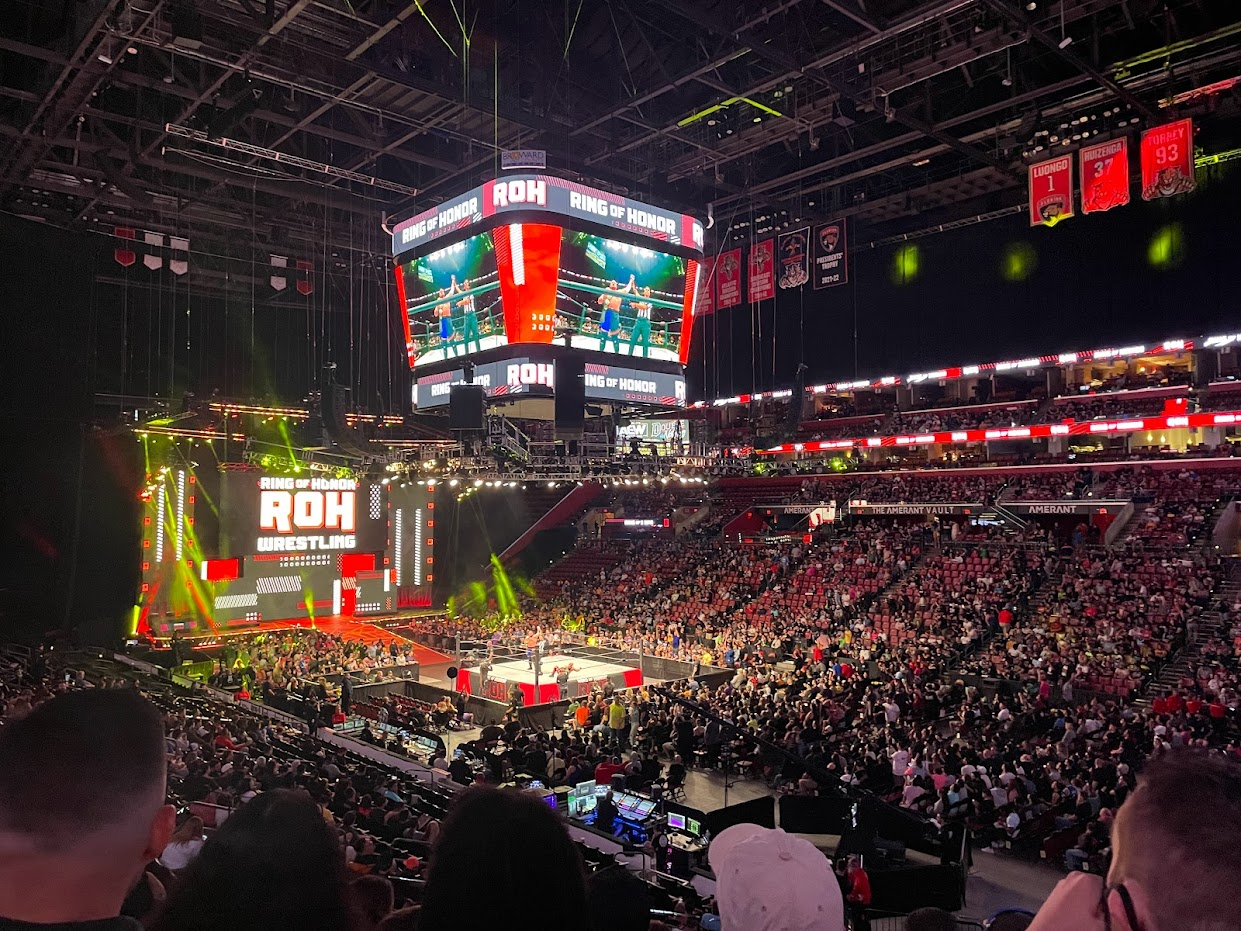
Ring of Honor set 2023

On April 1 at Supercard of Honor XV, the first ROH event after the hiatus, Jonathan Gresham defeated Bandido in the main event to unify the ROH World Championship, and numerous other ROH titles changed hands. The event also saw the return of former ROH champion, and recently inducted ROH Hall of Famer, Samoa Joe.

On May 4, the sale of ROH to Tony Khan was officially completed. ROH matches began appearing on AEW programs, and Death Before Dishonor was the first ROH PPV under the new ownership. On December 10, after Final Battle, Khan announced that ROH's weekly televised program will be aired on the relaunched Honor Club streaming platform, starting in 2023.

On January 18, 2023, a one-off special tribute show to ROH mainstay Jay Briscoe, who had been killed in a car accident the day before, was taped for Honor Club.

On February 25 and 26, new episodes of the relaunched Ring of Honor Wrestling program were taped at Soundstage 19 in Universal Studios in Orlando, Florida before shifting to taping new episodes in conjunction with AEW events across the world. On March 2, the weekly series began to air exclusively through Honor Club.

Beginning on March 1, 2026, episodes of the weekly Ring of Honor Wrestling program would be taped at the WJCT studios in Jacksonville, Florida.

== Features ==
=== Code of Honor ===
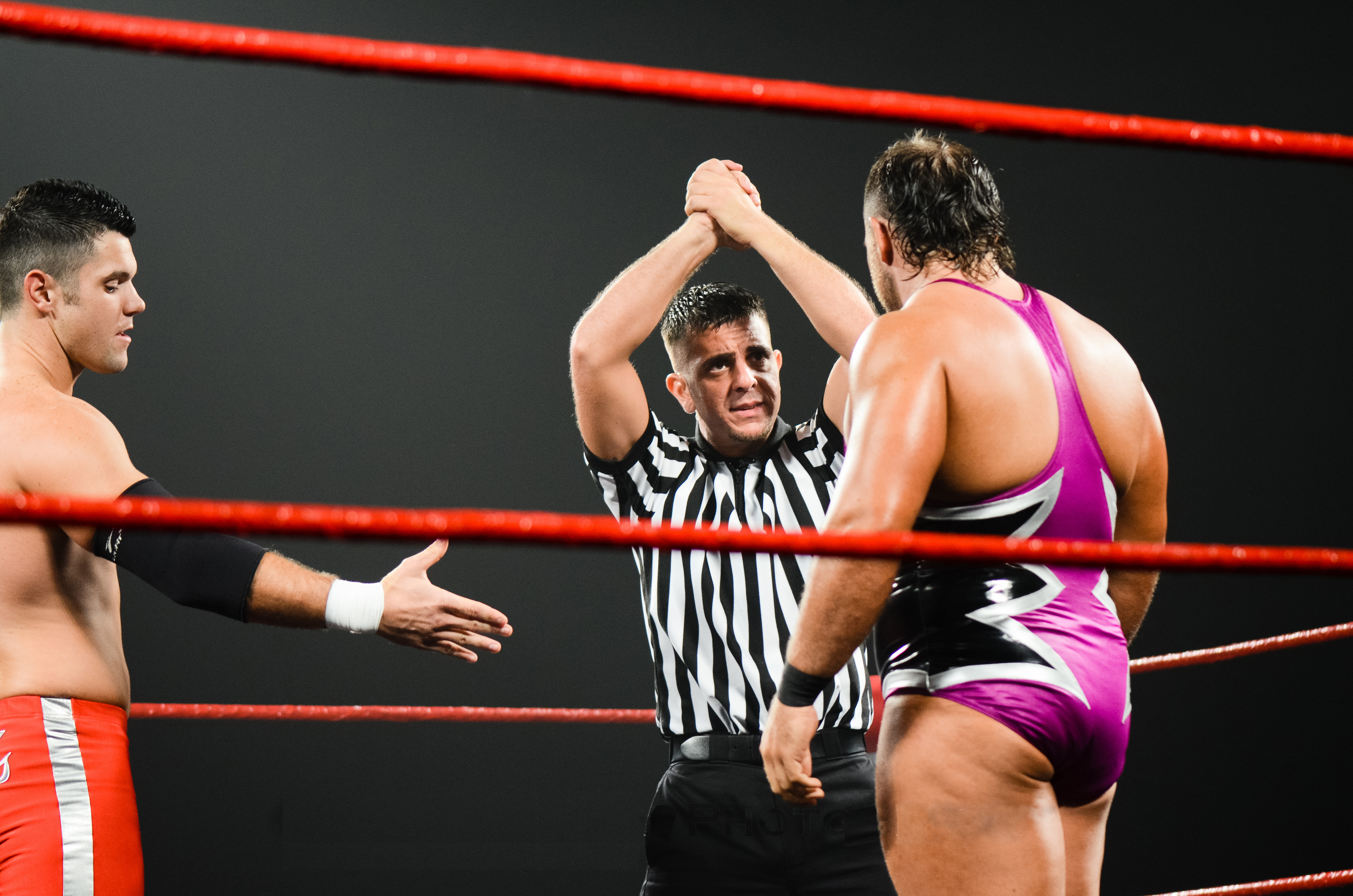
The Code of Honor allows wrestlers to establish themselves as heroic or villainous characters; the referee is shown trying to convince Michael Elgin to accept the hand of Eddie Edwards.

ROH distinguishes its image from other wrestling promotions through the "Code of Honor", a set of rules dictating how wrestlers should conduct themselves during matches. The Code of Honor aimed to infuse Ring of Honor's matches with a feel similar to Japanese professional wrestling.

When the promotion began, the Code of Honor included five "Laws" mentioned at some point during each ROH production. ROH considered it a moral requirement to follow these rules, which usually appeared in the following order:

1. You must shake hands before and after every match
2. No outside interference
3. No sneak attacks
4. No harming the officials
5. Any action resulting in a disqualification violates the Code of Honor

In early 2004, ROH's booker at the time, Gabe Sapolsky, began to feel that the Code of Honor had run its course. As a result, wrestlers no longer had to follow it.

The Code of Honor eventually re-appeared – revamped – as the following three rules:

1. Shake hands before and after the match if you respect your opponent
2. Keep the playing-field level
3. Respect the officials

=== Future of Honor ===
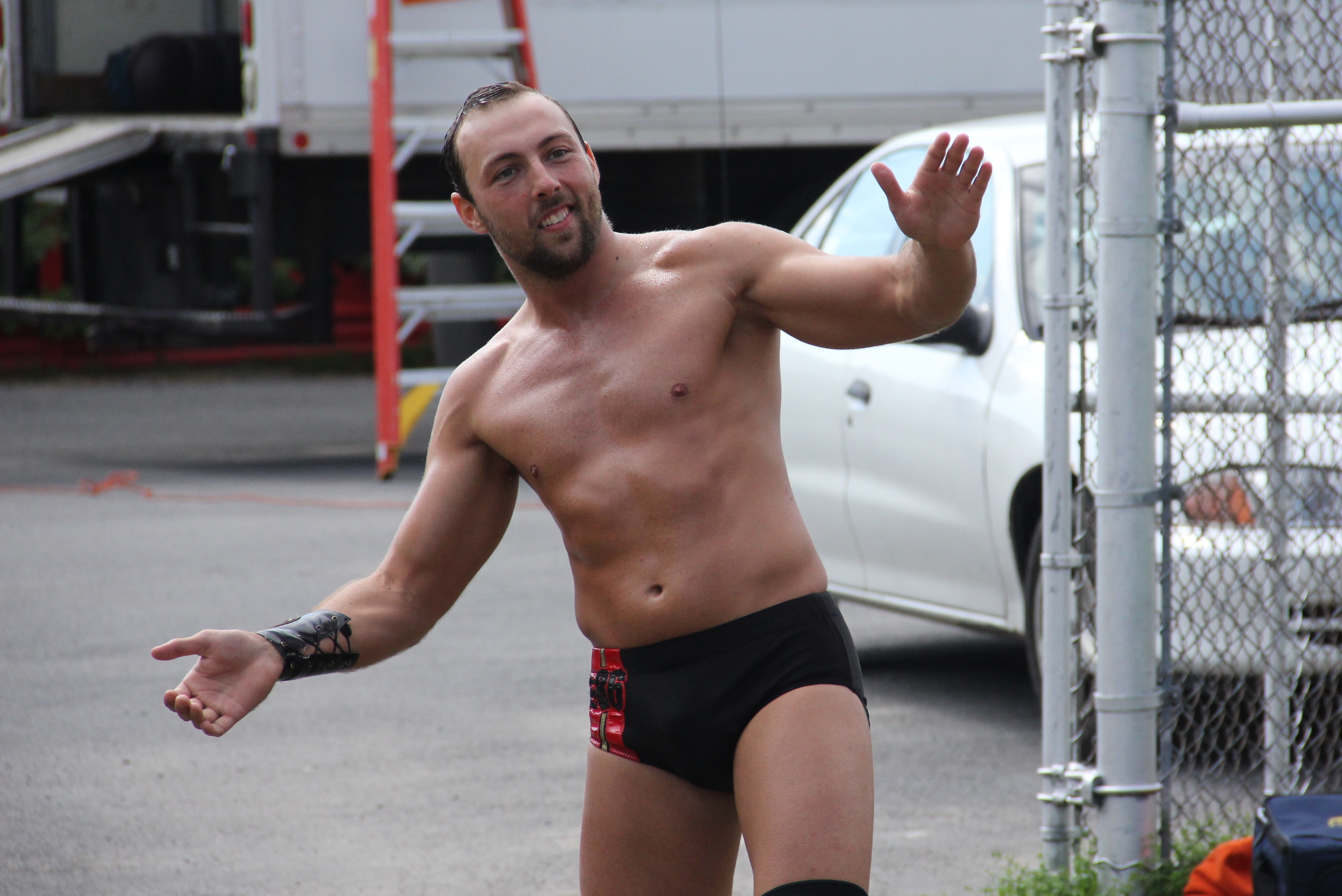
Former Future of Honor contestant Colin Delaney

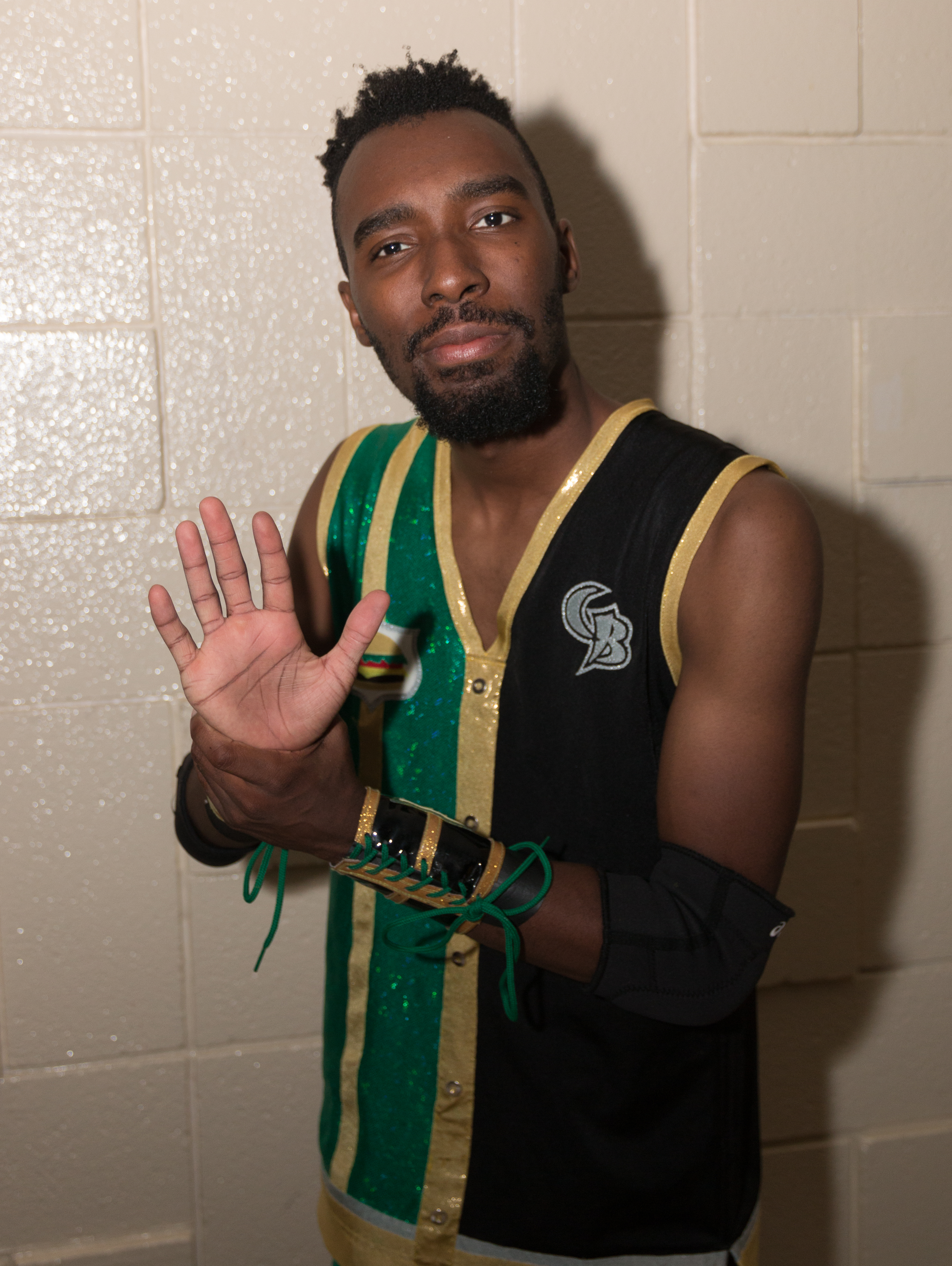
Another former Future of Honor contestant, Cheeseburger

Future of Honor (FOH) is a series of events featuring the promotion's young wrestlers and trainees from the ROH Dojo. The term "Future of Honor" is additionally used by the promotion to refer to their young wrestlers and graduates from the dojo system (regardless of gender).

=== Women of Honor ===
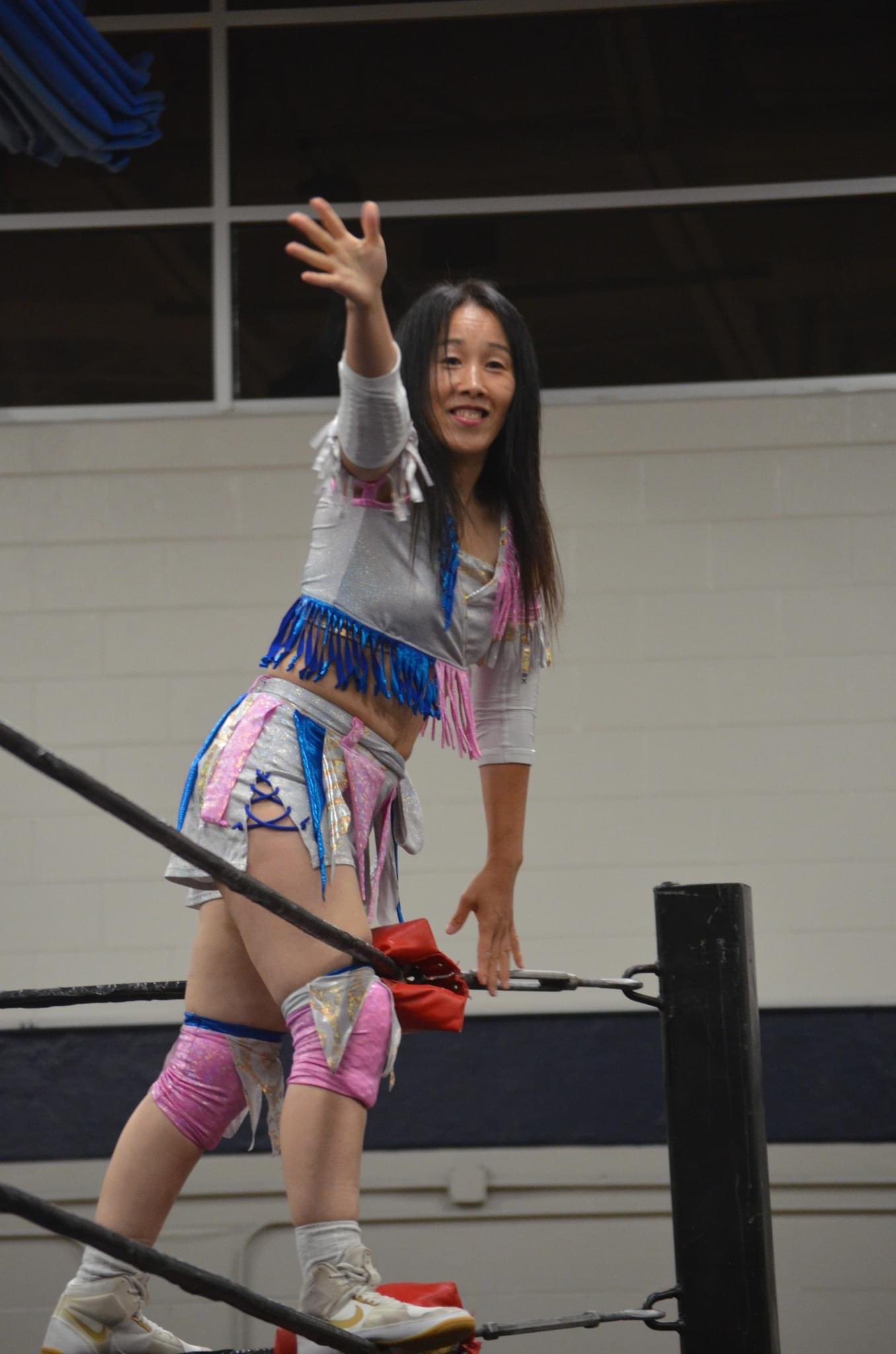
Inaugural ROH Women of Honor World Championship holder Sumie Sakai

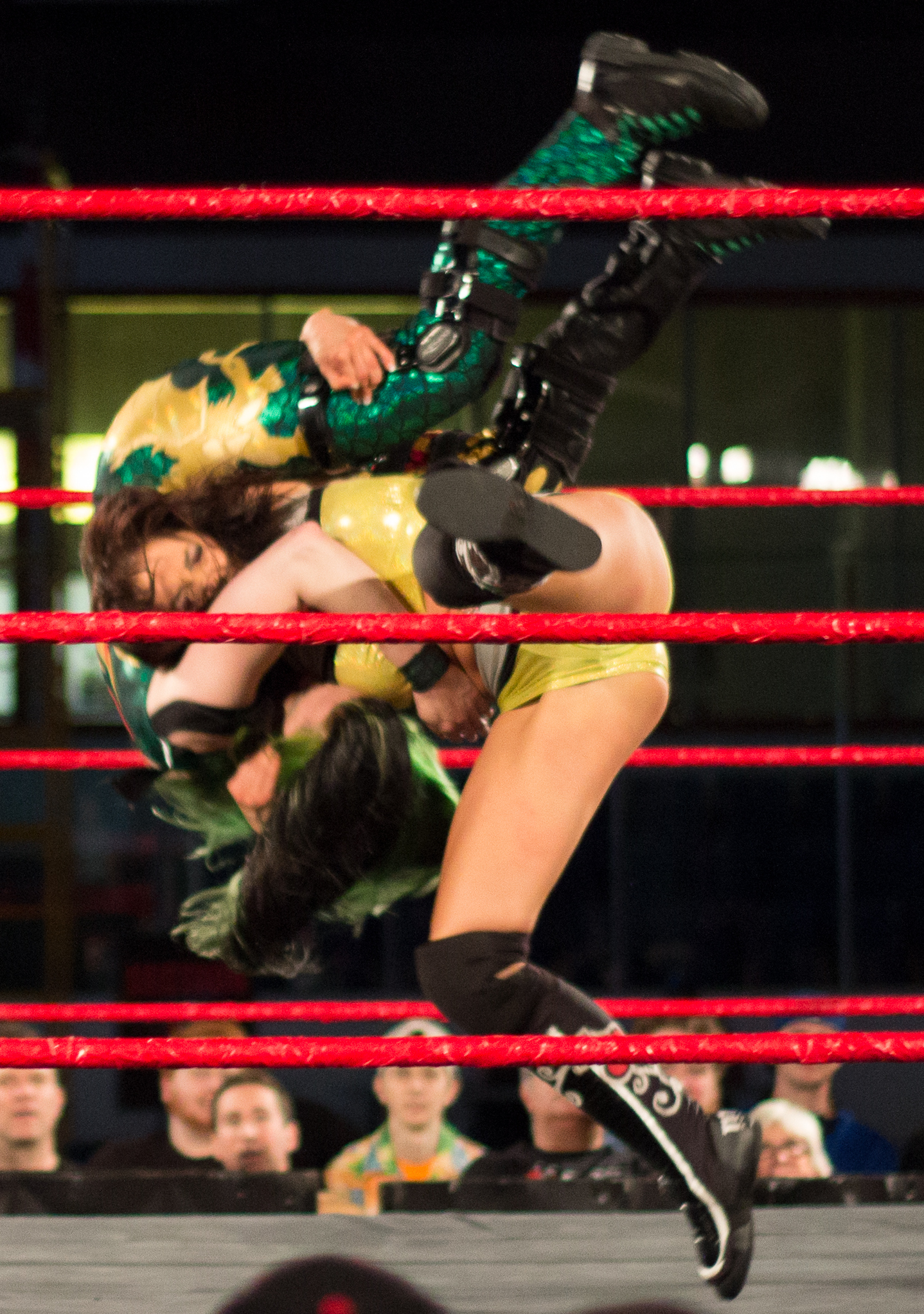
Former Women of Honor competitor Cherry Bomb executing a Death Valley Driver on another former Women of Honor competitor, MsChif.

The ROH Women of Honor (WOH) division began in 2002, with women's wrestlers sporadically appearing on ROH events until the division was reformed into a permanent feature of the promotion in 2015. The term "Women of Honor" is additionally used by the promotion to refer to their female wrestlers and other female talent. The current top championship in the Women of Honor division is the ROH Women's World Championship and their other women's title is the ROH Women's World Television Championship. Previous women's championships used by ROH include the Women of Honor World Championship, the Shimmer Championship, and the Shimmer Tag Team Championship.

=== ROH Dojo ===
ROH also runs a professional wrestling school. Originally named the "ROH Wrestling Academy", and based in Bristol, Pennsylvania, ROH announced in July 2016 that the following month it was re-opening the school as the "ROH Dojo" in Baltimore, Maryland. Delirious operates as the head trainer of the school with Cheeseburger and Will Ferrara as his assistants. Previous head trainers of the academy include former ROH World Champions CM Punk, Austin Aries, and Bryan Danielson. From 2005 to 2008, ROH used a "Top of the Class" trophy to promote the students on the main show; while wrestlers win and lose the Trophy in matches, the School's head trainer chooses the winners.

=== ROH Hall of Fame ===
On January 26, 2022, the ROH Hall of Fame (HOF) was introduced inducting the company's first four Hall of Famers plus one due to one induction being a ROH tag team.

=== "Proving Ground" matches ===
As part of ROH's re-launch the promotion added a new contest: the "Proving Ground" match. The match features an up-and-coming star against a seasoned professional who is a title-holder. If the up-and-coming star can last ten minutes against – or even defeat – the seasoned professional, the newcomer would earn a future title shot. To date, only one newcomer has earned a title shot from a proving ground match: Lee Moriarty, who lasted ten minutes against then-ROH Pure Champion Wheeler Yuta, to earn a title shot at Death Before Dishonor in 2024, where Moriarty would defeat Yuta to become the new ROH Pure Champion.

"Proving Ground" matches were also relevant for new coming talent in Ring of Honor (ROH) back in 2011 as well.

=== ROH Honor For All ===
Honor For All is a professional wrestling event, held annually by the Ring of Honor promotion. The event was initially held in 2018 and its last event was held in 2021. There was no 2020 event of the scheduled pay-per-view due to the COVID-19 pandemic. It is currently unknown if or when the event will be reinstated in the future.

Event	Date	Venue	City	Main event
Honor for All	July 20, 2018	Nashville Municipal Auditorium	Nashville, Tennessee	The Young Bucks (Matt Jackson & Nick Jackson) vs. The Addiction (Christopher Daniels & Frankie Kazarian) vs. The Briscoes (Jay Briscoe & Mark Briscoe)
Honor for All (2019)	August 25, 2019	Nashville Fairgrounds Arena	Nashville, Tennessee	Jeff Cobb vs. Matt Taven vs. Jay Lethal vs. Kenny King
Honor for All (2021)	November 14, 2021	Chesapeake Employers Insurance Arena	Baltimore, Maryland	Bandido vs. Demonic Flamita
(c) – refers to the champion(s) heading into the match

== Partnerships ==
Throughout its history, Ring of Honor has had working agreements with various domestic and international wrestling promotions at different times. ROH shows have had outside championships defended on them and on some occasions, wrestlers have held both ROH and outside championships simultaneously.

In February 2014, ROH and NJPW announced a working relationship which would see talent exchanges and dual events between the two promotions. The first co-promoted shows Global Wars and War of the Worlds, took place in May 2014, in Toronto and New York City respectively, with the two companies again co-promoting these events in May 2015 – with the War of the Worlds '15 taking place at the 2300 Arena in Philadelphia on May 12 and 13, and the Global Wars '15 event in Toronto on May 15 and 16. As part of the relationship with NJPW, ROH announced it would promote two shows, entitled Honor Rising: Japan 2016, in Tokyo in February 2016.

On August 10, 2016, Mexican promotion Consejo Mundial de Lucha Libre (CMLL) officially announced a working relationship with ROH. The two promotions were linked through their separate partnerships with NJPW. Their alliance ended on April 27, 2021.

In February 2017, ROH began a partnership with Japanese women's promotion World Wonder Ring Stardom.

In August 2017, ROH partnered with United Kingdom promotion Revolution Pro Wrestling (RPW), producing joint events such as War of the Worlds UK.

In 2018, ROH entered into a partnership with the independent promotion Pro Wrestling Guerrilla (PWG).

In 2019, Maryland based independent promotion MCW Pro Wrestling was made an affiliate of ROH, serving as an additional training ground for ROH recruits.

== Championships and accomplishments ==
=== Current champions ===
As of November 12, 2026.

=== Men's division ===
Singles

Championship	Current champion(s)	Reign	Date won	Days held	Location	Notes	Ref.
ROH World Championship	Bandido	2	April 6, 2025	585	Philadelphia, Pennsylvania	Defeated Chris Jericho in a Title vs. Mask match at AEW Dynasty.	
ROH World Television Championship	Action Andretti	1	August 21, 2026	83	Philadelphia, Pennsylvania	Defeated Lio Rush in a Fight Without Honor at Death Before Dishonor.	
ROH Pure Championship	Lee Moriarty	1	July 26, 2024	839	Arlington, Texas	Defeated Wheeler Yuta at Death Before Dishonor.	

Tag Team

Championship	Current champion(s)	Reign	Date won	Days held	Location	Notes	Ref.
ROH World Tag Team Championship	El Sky Team (Místico and Máscara Dorada)	1	June 26, 2026	139	Mexico City, Mexico	Defeated La Facción Ingobernable (Sammy Guevara and The Beast Mortos) at CMLL Super Viernes.	
ROH World Six-Man Tag Team Championship	The Lethal Twist (Jay Lethal, Blake Christian, and Lee Johnson)	1	August 21, 2026	83	Philadelphia, Pennsylvania	Defeated Dalton Castle and The Outrunners (Truth Magnum and Turbo Floyd) at Death Before Dishonor.	

=== Women's division ===
Championship	Current champion(s)	Reign	Date won	Days held	Location	Notes	Ref.
ROH Women's World Championship	Athena	1	December 10, 2022	1,433	Arlington, Texas	Defeated Mercedes Martinez at Final Battle.	
ROH Women's World Television Championship	Red Velvet	2	December 5, 2025	342	Columbus, Ohio	Defeated Mercedes Moné at Final Battle.	
ROH Women's Pure Championship	Deonna Purrazzo	1	December 5, 2025	342	Columbus, Ohio	Defeated Billie Starkz in a tournament final to become the inaugural champion at Final Battle.	

=== Other accomplishments ===
Accomplishment	Current winner(s)	Date won	Location	Event
Survival of the Fittest	Komander	December 20, 2024	New York City, New York	Final Battle; The match was for the ROH World Television Championship.
Honor Rumble	Alex Zayne	September 12, 2021	Philadelphia, Pennsylvania	Death Before Dishonor XVIII (Preshow)

== See also ==
- List of Ring of Honor pay-per-view and livestreaming events
- List of Ring of Honor personnel
- List of former Ring of Honor personnel
- Ring of Honor Wrestling
