= MexaBlood =

Professional wrestling tag team

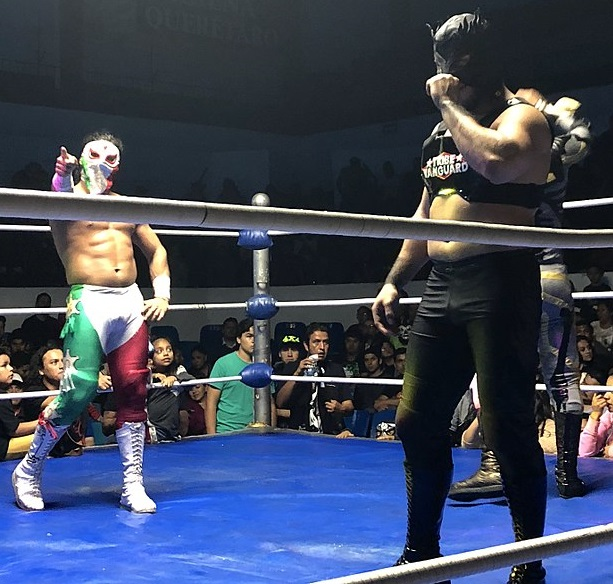
- Bandido (left) and Flamita (right) at a Promociones Tao event in March 2018

Tag team
- Name(s): MexaBlood; Mexa Squad; MexaSquad; MexiSquad
- Former members: Bandido; Flamita; Rey Horus
- Debut: January 13, 2018
- Disbanded: December 3, 2021
- Years active: 2018–2021

MexaBlood was a Mexican professional wrestling tag team consisting of Bandido and Flamita. The team wrestled for various international promotions, such as World Series Wrestling in Australia, PROGRESS Wrestling and Revolution Pro Wrestling in England, Dragon Gate in Japan, Lucha Libre AAA Worldwide and The Crash in Mexico, and Pro Wrestling Guerrilla and Ring of Honor in the United States.

Bandido and Flamita began teaming together in Dragon Gate in 2018, and soon formed the tag team "MexaBlood". The team became very successful as they won numerous championships including The Crash Tag Team Championship, and PROGRESS Tag Team Championship. In 2020, the team expanded into a faction as they were joined by Rey Horus. The trio began teaming as "MexiSquad" and won the ROH World Six-Man Tag Team Championship. MexiSquad became the longest-reigning World Six-Man Tag Team Champions, holding the title for a record 405 days. MexaBlood broke up when Flamita turned on Bandido after losing a match in 2021. Bandido would then continue to team with Horus as MexiSquad until the team quietly disbanded as they went their separate ways.

== History ==
=== Dragon Gate (2018) ===
On January 13, 2018, Bandido and Flamita began teaming with each other as they teamed with Genki Horiguchi to take on Dezmond Xavier, Susumu Yokosuka and Zachary Wentz in a six-man tag team match at the first night of Dragon Gate's Open The New Year Gate tour, which Bandido and Flamita's team lost. They wrestled Xavier and Wentz five times during the tour, losing to them on January 16 and defeating them on January 28. Bandido and Flamita made various appearances for the promotion throughout the year. Their last match as a team in Dragon Gate occurred at Final Gate on December 23, where they participated in a four-way match for the vacant Open the Twin Gate Championship. The match was won by Big Ben (Ben-K and Big R Shimizu).

=== The Crash (2018–2019) ===
On March 17, 2018, Bandido and Flamita teamed with each other for the first time in The Crash, by defeating Aeroboy and Septimo Dragon and The Rascalz (Dezmond Xavier and Zachary Wentz) in a three-way match to win the vacant The Crash Tag Team Championship. Bandido also achieved singles success by defeating Dezmond Xavier and Laredo Kid in a three-way elimination match to win the vacant The Crash Cruiserweight Championship on May 19. On October 7, the Tag Team Championship was vacated. On March 23, Bandido lost the Cruiserweight Championship to Jonathan Gresham in a four-way elimination match, also involving Flamita and Shane Strickland. MexaBlood would then challenge Lucha Brothers (PENTA EL 0M and Rey Fenix) for the Tag Team Championship on April 4, 2019, but lost. On November 23, Bandido defeated Rey Horus and Marty Scurll in a three-way match to win The Crash Heavyweight Championship.

=== Pro Wrestling Guerrilla (2018–2019) ===
On March 23, 2018, MexaBlood made their Pro Wrestling Guerrilla debut at Time is a Flat Circle, where they lost to The Rascalz (Dezmond Xavier and Zachary Wentz). In September, Bandido and Flamita were announced to participate in the Battle of Los Angeles tournament at the namesake event. Bandido and Flamita both advanced in the first round by defeating T-Hawk and Puma King respectively. On the second night, MexaBlood teamed with future partner Rey Horus to take on CIMA and The Rascalz in a losing effort. On the third night, Bandido and Flamita faced each other in the quarterfinals of the tournament, with Bandido winning the match. Bandido would reach the tournament final, becoming the runner-up by being defeated by the tournament winner Jeff Cobb. Bandido's stock began rising in PWG following the tournament as he was more prominently featured in singles matches. MexaBlood would team with Rey Horus again at Sixteen on July 26, 2019, where they defeated Black Taurus, Laredo Kid and Puma King. MexaBlood then headlined the first night of Battle of Los Angeles against Lucha Brothers (PENTA EL 0M and Rey Fenix) in a losing effort. Bandido would then participate in the Battle of Los Angeles tournament, which he won by defeating David Starr and Jonathan Gresham in the final. Bandido would cash-in on the opportunity by defeating Jeff Cobb to win the PWG World Championship at Makings of a Varsity Athlete.

=== Lucha Libre AAA Worldwide (2018) ===
Bandido made his Lucha Libre AAA Worldwide debut on July 29, 2018, as he teamed with Flamita and Aramis against Nuevo Poder del Norte (Carta Brava Jr., Mocho Cota Jr. and Tito Santana) in a losing effort. At Triplemanía XXVI, MexaBlood defeated Team AAA (Aero Star and Drago), Team ELITE (Laredo Kid and Golden Magic), Team Impact! (DJZ and Andrew Everett) in a four-way ladder match to become the No. 1 contenders for the AAA World Tag Team Championship. They received their title shot against Los Mercenarios (Rey Escorpión and El Texano Jr.) in a three-way match, also involving DJZ and Everett at Héroes Inmortales XII. Los Mercenarios retained the title.

=== PROGRESS Wrestling (2018) ===
MexaBlood debuted for PROGRESS Wrestling during the promotion's Coast To Coast Tour in the United States on August 9, 2018, where they teamed with Rey Horus against British Strong Style (Pete Dunne, Trent Seven and Tyler Bate) in a losing effort. On August 11, MexaBlood defeated Chris Brookes and AR Fox (Kid Lykos' replacement) to win the PROGRESS Tag Team Championship. They successfully defended the titles against Grizzled Young Veterans (James Drake and Zack Gibson), before losing the titles to Aussie Open in a Thunderbastard, after being eliminated by The 198 (Morgan Webster and Wild Boar).

=== Revolution Pro Wrestling (2018) ===
Bandido and Flamita debuted for Revolution Pro Wrestling as participants in the 2018 British J-Cup. They lost their first round matches to eventual winner El Phantasmo and Rich Swann respectively on September 7. The following night, on September 8, MexaBlood lost a match to Aussie Open (Mark Davis and Kyle Fletcher).

=== World Series Wrestling (2019) ===
MexaBlood made their World Series Wrestling debut during the International Assault: Defend and Destroy tour on March 7, 2019, where they unsuccessfully challenged Villain Enterprises (Brody King and Marty Scurll) for the WSW Tag Team Championship. MexaBlood then lost to SoCal Uncensored (Christopher Daniels and Frankie Kazarian) on March 8, before picking up their first win in WSW by defeating The VeloCities (Jude London and Paris DeSilva) on March 10. The two partners then competed against each other in a match on March 11, which Bandido won.

=== Ring of Honor (2019–2021) ===
Bandido made his Ring of Honor debut in January 2019, followed by Flamita, who joined the promotion in October to replace Bandido for the Honor United: UK tour. MexaBlood debuted as a team in ROH at Final Battle, by defeating Villain Enterprises (Flip Gordon and Marty Scurll). At Saturday Night at Center Stage on January 11, 2020, MexaBlood teamed with Rey Horus to form the trio MexiSquad, as they defeated Villain Enterprises (Brody King, Flip Gordon and Marty Scurll) to win the ROH World Six-Man Tag Team Championship. At Honor Reigns Supreme, Bandido and Flamita lost their respective matches to Alex Zayne and Flip Gordon, while Horus defeated Andrew Everett. At Free Enterprise, MexaBlood lost a match to The Briscoes (Jay Briscoe and Mark Briscoe). MexiSquad were scheduled to make their first title defense of the World Six-Man Tag Team Championship against Jeff Cobb and The Foundation (Jay Lethal and Jonathan Gresham) at Gateway to Honor. However, Flamita suffered a torn meniscus, and instead Bandido and Horus competed against Foundation in a Proving Ground match, where they would earn a ROH World Tag Team Championship opportunity on winning the match. However, Bandido and Horus lost the match. A title defense for MexiSquad was announced against Amazing Red, Rocky Romero, and Will Ospreay at Supercard of Honor XIV. However, the event was cancelled due to the COVID-19 pandemic in the United States, and ROH went on a hiatus.

ROH resumed holding events in August, and MexiSquad were scheduled to defend the titles against Shane Taylor Promotions (Shane Taylor, Kaun and Moses). However, Bandido, Flamita, EC3 and Kenny King were pulled off the event due to pre-travel testing for COVID-19. However, Horus competed at Final Battle, defeating Dalton Castle in a match. MexiSquad would then defend the titles against Shane Taylor Promotions on the February 20 episode of Ring of Honor Wrestling, which they lost. MexiSquad unsuccessfully challenged STP for the titles in a rematch during the pre-show of 19th Anniversary Show. Bandido tended to Flamita after the match as Flamita had been pinned. However, Flamita shoved Bandido away which led to Horus trying to make peace between the two. Flamita challenged the two to a three-way match at the pay-per-view. Bandido won the three-way match by pinning Flamita. Flamita would refuse to shake hands with his MexiSquad partners after the match and walked away. MexaBlood would then take on Jay Lethal and Jonathan Gresham on the April 10 episode of Ring of Honor Wrestling. During the match, Bandido accidentally kicked Flamita, which led to Flamita turning on Bandido by attacking him and abandoning him, causing Bandido to lose the match. As a result, MexaBlood broke up.

Flamita would then begin feuding with his former MexiSquad partners, beginning with a win over Bandido on the May 1 episode of Ring of Honor Wrestling. Flamita would then change his ring name to Demonic Flamita, and defeated Horus to qualify for the Survival of the Fittest on the June 5 episode of Ring of Honor Wrestling. Flamita would compete in the Survival of the Fittest six-way elimination match on the June 26 episode of Ring of Honor Wrestling, where he was the first person eliminated by his former partner Bandido, who went on to win the match. The rivalry between Horus and Flamita continued as Horus defeated Flamita at Best in the World, and Flamita defeated Horus in a no disqualification match on the August 21 episode of Ring of Honor Wrestling. Flamita would then challenge Bandido for the ROH World Championship in a Four Corner Survival Elimination match at Death Before Dishonor XVIII, also involving Brody King and EC3. Bandido retained the title. The rivalry between Bandido and Flamita would settle in a non-title no disqualification match at Honor for All, which Bandido won to end the feud.

Following Flamita's departure from the group, Bandido and Horus teamed as MexiSquad five more times, with their last match as a team occurring on the December 4 episode of Ring of Honor Wrestling, which they won by defeating Flip Gordon and PJ Black.

== Championships and accomplishments ==
- PROGRESS Wrestling
  - PROGRESS Tag Team Championship (1 time)
- Pro Wrestling Guerrilla
  - PWG World Championship (1 time) – Bandido
  - Battle of Los Angeles (2019) – Bandido
- The Crash
  - The Crash Cruiserweight Championship (1 time) – Bandido
  - The Crash Heavyweight Championship (1 time) – Bandido
  - The Crash Tag Team Championship (1 time)
- Ring of Honor
  - ROH World Championship (1 time) – Bandido
  - ROH World Six-Man Tag Team Championship (1 time) – with Rey Horus
