= Battle of Los Angeles (2019) =

2019 professional wrestling tournament by PWG

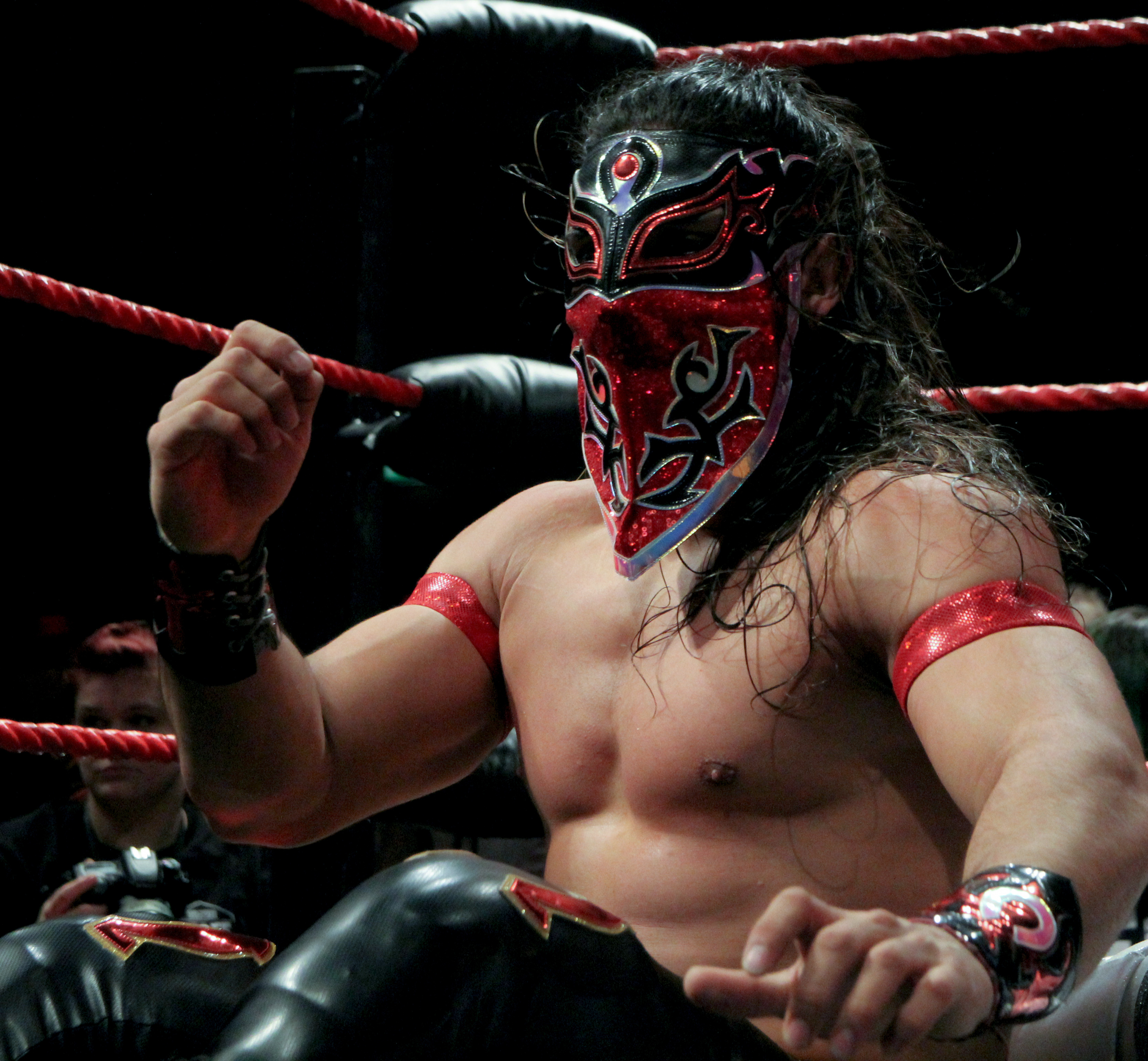
- The 2019 tournament winner Bandido
- Promotion: Pro Wrestling Guerrilla
- Date: Night One: September 19, 2019; Night Two: September 20, 2019; Night Three: September 22, 2019
- City: Los Angeles, California
- Venue: Globe Theatre

Event chronology
← Previous; Sixteen	Next → The Makings of a Varsity Athlete

Battle of Los Angeles chronology
← Previous; 2018	Next → 2022

Battle of Los Angeles (2019) was the fifteenth Battle of Los Angeles professional wrestling tournament produced by Pro Wrestling Guerrilla (PWG). It was a three-night event held on September 19, September 20, and September 22, 2019, at the Globe Theatre in Los Angeles, California.

The 2019 tournament featured twenty-four participants and concluded on the third night with Bandido defeating David Starr and Jonathan Gresham in a three-way elimination match in the final. Aside from the tournament matches, tag team matches took place across three nights and a ten-man tag team match took place on the night three. The tournament featured the PWG debuts of A-Kid, Artemis Spencer, Caveman Ugg, Daisuke Sekimoto, Dragon Lee, Lucky Kid and Mick Moretti. Other PWG debutants at the event included Alex Zayne and Blake Christian, who competed in a tag team match on night one, and Paris De Silva who participated in a ten-man tag team match on night three.

== Background ==
=== Original lineup ===
On June 4, 2019, PWG announced via its official Twitter handle that the 2019 Battle of Los Angeles tournament would be held on September 19, September 20, and September 22, 2019, at the Globe Theatre in Los Angeles, California. The following participants were announced for the tournament: A-Kid, Jonathan Gresham, Artemis Spencer, Darby Allin, Mick Moretti, Orange Cassidy, Bandido, Caveman Ugg, Jake Atlas, Tony Deppen, Rey Fenix, Lucky Kid, Joey Janela, Brody King, Bárbaro Cavernario, Jungle Boy, Black Taurus, Rey Horus, David Starr, Laredo Kid, the 2018 winner and the World Champion Jeff Cobb, Dragon Lee, PENTA EL 0M and Daisuke Sekimoto.

=== Replacement ===
Due to a scheduling conflict, Bárbaro Cavernario was replaced by Aramís. Laredo Kid was unable to compete due to participating in the reality competition series Exatlon and was subsequently replaced by Puma King.

=== Non-tournament matches ===
Along with the Battle of Los Angeles tournament, PWG announced several non-tournament matches heading into the event. On August 16, two non-tournament tag team matches were announced for night one: Alex Zayne and Joey Janela versus Blake Christian and Tony Deppen and Lucha Brothers (PENTA EL 0M and Rey Fenix) versus MexaBlood (Bandido and Flamita). A World Tag Team Championship match was scheduled between the champions The Rascalz (Dezmond Xavier and Zachary Wentz) and Aussie Open (Kyle Fletcher and Mark Davis) for night two. A match between Aussie Open and The Dark Order (Evil Uno and Stu Grayson) was scheduled to take place on night three, which would turn into a World Tag Team Championship match if Aussie Open were to beat Rascalz for the titles.

However, Davis suffered a ruptured MCL and torn ACL while warming up for his match before BOLA, resulting in both of Aussie Open's matches being changed. The match between Rascalz and Aussie Open on night two was changed to a non-title match with A-Kid being announced as Davis' replacement to team with Fletcher. On night three, Rey Horus and Aramis replaced Aussie Open as Dark Order's opponents while Fletcher would participate in a ten-man tag team match later in the night.

== Event ==
=== Night 1 ===
The 2019 Battle of Los Angeles tournament kicked off with the first round match between debutants A-Kid and Lucky Kid. A-Kid applied an armbar on Lucky Kid and hit him with the chops while applying the hold, forcing the latter to submit.

Next, Brody King took on the debuting Caveman Ugg. King delivered a Gonzo Bomb to Ugg for the win.

Next, Rey Horus took on the debuting Dragon Lee. Lee hit a running knee strike to Horus for the win.

Next, a non-tournament tag team match took place pitting Joey Janela and the debuting Alex Zayne against Tony Deppen and the debuting Blake Christian. Zayne delivered a running 630° senton to Deppen for the win.

The BOLA tournament continued next as Darby Allin took on Black Taurus. Allin pinned Taurus with a cradle for the win.

Next, Jonathan Gresham took on the debuting Artemis Spencer. Gresham knocked Spencer out by repeatedly hitting him with blows, forcing the referee to stop the match and award the victory to Gresham.

Next, the PWG World Champion Jeff Cobb took on the debuting Daisuke Sekimoto. Cobb delivered a Tour of the Islands to Sekimoto for the win.

It was followed by the main event of the night one pitting Lucha Brothers (PENTA EL 0M and Rey Fenix) against MexaBlood (Bandido and Flamita). Lucha Brothers executed a double-team combination on Flamita as PENTA and Fenix respectively delivered a Fear Factor and a diving double foot stomp at the same time.

=== Night 2 ===
The first round of BOLA continued on the second night as Joey Janela took on the debuting Mick Moretti. Moretti threw a fireball to Janela's face and the referee handed a towel to Janela to recover from it. Janela threw the towel on Moretti's face and hit a superkick for the win.

Next, Jake Atlas took on Jungle Boy. Atlas delivered a LGB-DDT to Jungle Boy from the ring apron to the outside floor and then tossed him into the ring to pin him for the win.

Next, Rey Fenix took on Aramis. Fenix delivered a Black Fire Driver to Aramis for the win.

It was followed by a tag team match pitting The Rascalz (Dezmond Xavier and Zachary Wentz) against Kyle Fletcher and A-Kid, a replacement for the injured Mark Davis. Rascalz performed an aided moonsault for the win.

The BOLA tournament continued as Puma King defended the Ironman Heavymetalweight Championship against Bandido. Bandido delivered a spike piledriver to King to win the title and advance in the tournament. However, after the match, King exercised the title's 24/7 rule and rolled-up Bandido and pinned him to regain the Ironman Heavymetalweight Championship.

Next, PENTA EL 0M took on Tony Deppen. PENTA nailed a Fear Factor to Deppen for the win.

Next, Orange Cassidy took on David Starr. Starr hit a lariat to Cassidy for the win.

It was followed by night two's main event, in which Jonathan Gresham and Daisuke Sekimoto took on King's Hawaiian (Brody King and Jeff Cobb). Sekimoto delivered a German suplex to King for the win.

=== Night 3 ===
Quarterfinals

The night three began with the quarterfinals of the tournament as Jake Atlas took on Dragon Lee. Lee hit a running knee strike to Atlas for the win.

Next, Bandido took on Brody King. Bandido executed a springboard 21 Plex for the win.

Next, Jonathan Gresham took on A-Kid. Gresham repeatedly hit A-Kid's knee into the mat, forcing the referee to stop the match.

Next, Rey Fenix took on Joey Janela. Janela twisted Fenix's mask to make it difficult for the latter to see and nailed a superkick on Fenix for the win.

Next, PENTA EL 0M took on Darby Allin. Allin pinned PENTA with a Last Supper for the win.

Next, Jeff Cobb took on David Starr. Starr took advantage when the referee got knocked out and hit Cobb with the PWG World Championship title belt and delivered a lariat to Cobb for the win.

It was followed by a tag team match in which The Dark Order (Evil Uno and Stu Grayson) took on Aramis and Rey Horus. Grayson delivered a diving neckbreaker to Aramis for the win.

Semifinals

Next, the semifinals of the tournament began as Jonathan Gresham took on Joey Janela. Gresham applied an octopus hold on Janela and attacked him forcing the referee to stop the match and award the win to Gresham.

Next, Bandido took on Dragon Lee. Bandido delivered a 21 Plex to Lee for the win.

Next, Darby Allin took on David Starr. Starr delivered a lariat to Allin for the win.

The penultimate match of the event was a ten-man tag team match pitting Artemis Spencer, Caveman Ugg, Jungle Boy, Orange Cassidy and the debuting Paris De Silva against Black Taurus, Kyle Fletcher, Lucky Kid, Mick Moretti and Tony Deppen. Cassidy spit orange juice in Deppen's face and rolled him up to pin him for the win.

Final

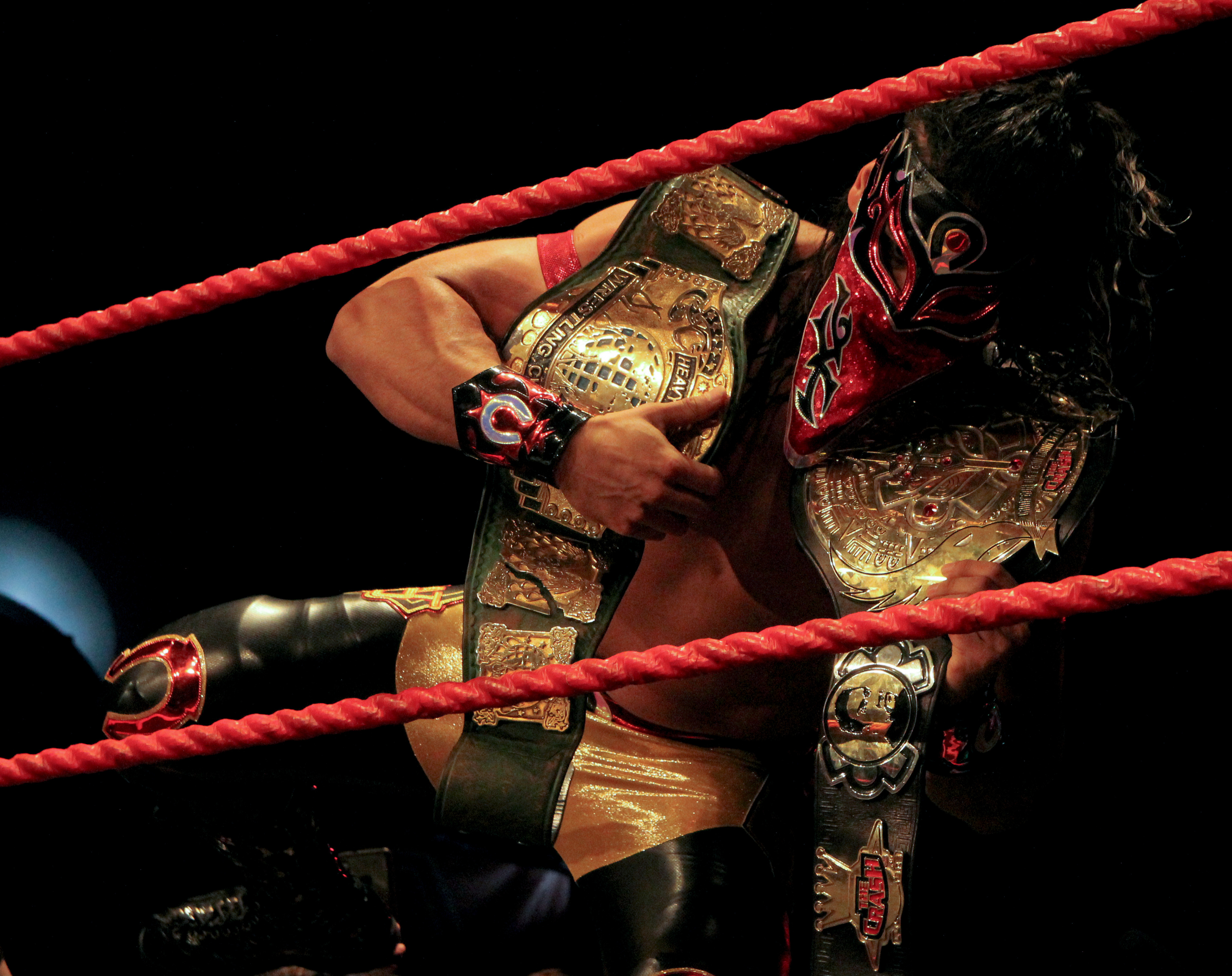
Bandido won the 2019 Battle of Los Angeles tournament and subsequently won the PWG World Championship.

It was followed by the tournament final, a three-way elimination match between Bandido, David Starr and Jonathan Gresham. Gresham eliminated Starr by applying an octopus hold on the latter and repeatedly hitting him with elbow strikes. Gresham tried to eliminate Bandido in the same way by applying an octopus hold but Bandido powered out of it by hitting a Samoan drop when the referee was about to stop the match. Bandido followed it by hitting Gresham with a falling powerslam from the top rope and a 21 Plex to win the tournament.

== Reception ==
Steve Bryant of SoCal Uncensored stated that the first night of the tournament was not "as good as last year’s night 1" while considering the second night a "letdown". However, he praised the third night, rating it "a great show" and recommended that "if you can only get one night, get night three".

Dave Meltzer of Wrestling Observer Newsletter showed heavy appreciation towards the semi-final match between Bandido and Dragon Lee on the third night, calling it a "match of the year candidate" and awarded it the prestigious five-star rating.

== Aftermath ==
After winning the 2019 Battle of Los Angeles, Bandido received a title shot against Jeff Cobb for the PWG World Championship at Makings of a Varsity Athlete, which resulted in Bandido defeating Cobb to win the World Championship.

== Results ==
Night 1 (September 19)
No.	Results	Stipulations	Times
1	A-Kid defeated Lucky Kid	Singles match in the Battle of Los Angeles tournament first round	18:31
2	Brody King defeated Caveman Ugg	Singles match in the Battle of Los Angeles tournament first round	10:52
3	Dragon Lee defeated Rey Horus	Singles match in the Battle of Los Angeles tournament first round	14:30
4	Alex Zayne and Joey Janela defeated Blake Christian and Tony Deppen	Tag team match	14:39
5	Darby Allin defeated Black Taurus	Singles match in the Battle of Los Angeles tournament first round	11:32
6	Jonathan Gresham defeated Artemis Spencer	Singles match in the Battle of Los Angeles tournament first round	13:09
7	Jeff Cobb defeated Daisuke Sekimoto	Singles match in the Battle of Los Angeles tournament first round	15:26
8	Lucha Brothers (PENTA EL 0M and Rey Fenix) defeated MexaBlood (Bandido and Flamita)	Tag team match	18:08

Night 2 (September 20)
No.	Results	Stipulations	Times
1	Joey Janela defeated Mick Moretti	Singles match in the Battle of Los Angeles tournament first round	12:29
2	Jake Atlas defeated Jungle Boy	Singles match in the Battle of Los Angeles tournament first round	19:05
3	Rey Fenix defeated Aramís	Singles match in the Battle of Los Angeles tournament first round	13:13
4	The Rascalz (Dezmond Xavier and Zachary Wentz) defeated A-Kid and Kyle Fletcher	Tag team match	22:27
5	Bandido defeated Puma King (c)	Singles match for the Ironman Heavymetalweight Championship in the Battle of Los Angeles tournament first round	10:40
6	PENTA EL 0M defeated Tony Deppen	Singles match in the Battle of Los Angeles tournament first round	14:33
7	David Starr defeated Orange Cassidy	Singles match in the Battle of Los Angeles tournament first round	18:06
8	Daisuke Sekimoto and Jonathan Gresham defeated King's Hawaiian (Brody King and Jeff Cobb)	Tag team match	22:47
(c) / – the champion(s) heading into the match

Night 3 (September 22)
No.	Results	Stipulations	Times
1	Dragon Lee defeated Jake Atlas	Singles match in the Battle of Los Angeles tournament quarter-final round	10:55
2	Bandido defeated Brody King	Singles match in the Battle of Los Angeles tournament quarter-final round	10:40
3	Jonathan Gresham defeated A-Kid	Singles match in the Battle of Los Angeles tournament quarter-final round	18:03
4	Joey Janela defeated Rey Fenix	Singles match in the Battle of Los Angeles tournament quarter-final round	15:58
5	Darby Allin defeated PENTA EL 0M	Singles match in the Battle of Los Angeles tournament quarter-final round	16:24
6	David Starr defeated Jeff Cobb	Singles match in the Battle of Los Angeles tournament quarter-final round	11:15
7	The Dark Order (Evil Uno and Stu Grayson) defeated Aramis and Rey Horus	Tag team match	14:48
8	Jonathan Gresham defeated Joey Janela	Singles match in the Battle of Los Angeles tournament semi-final round	8:30
9	Bandido defeated Dragon Lee	Singles match in the Battle of Los Angeles tournament semi-final round	11:53
10	David Starr defeated Darby Allin	Singles match in the Battle of Los Angeles tournament semi-final round	5:39
11	Artemis Spencer, Caveman Ugg, Jungle Boy, Orange Cassidy and Paris De Silva defeated Black Taurus, Kyle Fletcher, Lucky Kid, Mick Moretti and Tony Deppen	Ten-man tag team match	25:49
12	Bandido defeated David Starr and Jonathan Gresham (Note: Eliminations were as follows: Eliminated / Wrestler / Eliminated by / Elimination Move / Time; 1 / David Starr / Jonathan Gresham / Knocked out after receiving elbow strikes / 9:12; 2 / Jonathan Gresham / Bandido / Pinned after a 21 Plex / 23:26; 3 / Winner: / Bandido)	Three-way elimination match in the Battle of Los Angeles tournament final	23:26

=== Tournament brackets ===
Battle of Los Angeles (2019)
Tournament information
- Sport: Professional wrestling
- Location: Los Angeles, California
- Dates: September 19, 2019–September 22, 2019
- Tournament format(s): Single elimination tournament
- Participants: 24

Final positions
- Champion: Bandido
- 1st runner-up: Jonathan Gresham
- 2nd runner-up: David Starr

First round
Artemis Spencer	TKO
Jonathan Gresham	13:09
A-Kid	Sub
Lucky Kid	18:31
Rey Fénix	Pin
Aramís	13:13
Joey Janela	Pin
Mick Moretti	12:29

Quarterfinals
Jonathan Gresham	TKO
A-Kid	18:03
Rey Fénix	Pin
Joey Janela	15:58

Semifinals
Jonathan Gresham	Sub
Joey Janela	8:30

First round
Brody King	Pin
Caveman Ugg	10:52
Puma King*	Pin
Bandido	10:40
Jake Atlas	Pin
Jungle Boy	19:05
Rey Horus	Pin
Dragon Lee	14:30

Quarterfinals
Brody King	Pin
Bandido	10:40
Jake Atlas	Pin
Dragon Lee	10:55

Semifinals
Bandido	Pin
Dragon Lee	11:53

First round
PENTA EL 0M	Pin
Tony Deppen	14:35
Darby Allin	Pin
Black Taurus	11:32
Jeff Cobb	Pin
Daisuke Sekimoto	15:26
Orange Cassidy	Pin
David Starr	18:46

Quarterfinals
PENTA EL 0M	Pin
Darby Allin	16:24
Jeff Cobb	Pin
David Starr	11:15

Semifinals
Darby Allin	Pin
David Starr	5:39

Final
Jonathan Gresham	Pin
Bandido David Starr	23:26

* = Puma King's Ironman Heavymetalweight Championship was on the line
