= Fireball =

Fireball may refer to:

== Science ==
- Fireball (meteor), a brighter-than-usual meteor
- Ball lightning, an atmospheric electrical phenomenon
- Bassia scoparia, a plant species

== Arts and entertainment ==
=== Films ===
- The Fireball, a 1950 film starring Mickey Rooney and Pat O'Brien
- Fireball (film), a 2009 Thai martial arts action film directed by Thanakorn Pongsuwan
- Fireball: Visitors from Darker Worlds, a 2020 documentary film directed by Werner Herzog and Clive Oppenheimer

=== Fictional characters ===
- Fireball Hikari, a protagonist of Saber Rider and the Star Sheriffs American animated TV series (1987–1988)
- the main character from the 70s comic book Bullet (DC Thomson)
- a member of the Crusaders (DC Comics) team of superheroes
- a member of the All-Star Squadron
- a member of the New Crusaders (Archie Comics) superhero team
- one of the "stalkers" from the film The Running Man
- Rudolph's friend who is a reindeer in Rudolph the Red-Nosed Reindeer

=== Music ===
- Fireballs (band), an Australian psychobilly band
- The Fireballs, an American rock and roll band
- Fireball (album), a 1971 hard rock album by British band Deep Purple
  - "Fireball" (Deep Purple song), a 1971 Deep Purple song from the album of the same name
- "Fireball" (B'z song), a 1997 single by Japanese band B'z
- "Fireball" (Dev song), the 2009 debut single by American singer Dev
- "Fireball" (Pitbull song), a 2014 song by Pitbull featuring John Ryan
- "Fireball" (Willow Smith song), a 2011 song by Willow Smith

=== Other arts and entertainment ===
- Fireball (TV series), a 2008–2020 series of CGI anime shorts
- Fireball (manga), a 1979 unfinished manga
- Fireball (novel), a science fiction novel and the first in the Fireball trilogy by John Christopher
- Fireball (pinball), a pinball machine
- Hadouken (Street Fighter), also referred to as fireball, a ki-energy attack in the game Street Fighter
- Fireball (Dungeons & Dragons), a fictional magic spell in Dungeons & Dragons
- Fire Ball, an amusement ride
- Fireball (wrestler), a Mexican professional wrestler
- Fireball (wrestling move), an illegal professional wrestling move

== Ammunition ==
- .221 Remington Fireball, a centerfire cartridge
- .17 Remington Fireball, based on the .221 Fireball
- .300 Whisper, sometimes known as the .300 Fireball

== Sports ==
- Fireball (nickname), various sportspeople
- Augusta FireBall, an American soccer team in 2005 and 2006
- Tucson Fireballs, an American United Soccer Leagues team from 1997 to 2001, originally the Los Angeles Fireballs
- Fireball (dinghy), a type of small sailing boat

== Transportation ==
- Ryan FR Fireball, an American aircraft
- Fireball (dinghy), a sailing boat
- Buick V6 engine, originally marketed as Fireball

== Other uses ==
- Fireball (search engine), a web search engine
- Fireball (software), a browser-hijacking malware
- Fireball Cinnamon Whisky, a cinnamon flavoured Canadian whisky liqueur
- 522d Special Operations Squadron, a US Air Force squadron nicknamed the Fireballs
- McMaster Engineering Fireball, official symbol of the Faculty of Engineering McMaster University
- Atomic Fireball, a round, cinnamon-flavored hard candy invented by Nello Ferrara
- The Fireballs annual ceremony in Stonehaven

== See also ==
- Fireball XL5, a British TV series
- Fireball 500, a 1966 stock car racing film
- Ball of Fire (disambiguation)
- Great Balls of Fire (disambiguation)
