= Octagón Jr. (disambiguation) =

Octagón Jr. may refer to:

- Kalisto (wrestler) (born 1986), first Octagón Jr. (2012-)
- Flamita (born 1994), second Octagón Jr. (2016)
- Octagón Jr. (born 1990), third and current Octagón Jr. (2019– )
