= PWG Anniversary Show =

Annual supercard event by PWG

- Promotions: Pro Wrestling Guerrilla
- First event: The Reason For The Season
- Event gimmick: Event held to commemorate the anniversary of PWG's first show in 2003

PWG Anniversary Show was an annual professional wrestling event produced by Pro Wrestling Guerrilla (PWG). This event was usually held in July every year to commemorate the anniversary of PWG's debut event on July 26, 2003. There was only two instances where the event has been held in other months than July. The 2013 edition was held in August while the 2021 edition was held in September.

It was not specifically called the "anniversary show" and has undergone many names. The most common name is Threemendous, which was first used to celebrate the promotion's third anniversary in 2006. PWG has used this name for its anniversary events on a few more occasions.

== Dates, venues and main events ==
#	Event	Date	City	Venue	Main event
1	The Reason for the Season	July 10, 2004	Los Angeles, California	Hollywood-Los Feliz Jewish Community Center	Adam Pearce (c) vs. Frankie Kazarian in a Loser Leaves Town Steel Cage match for the PWG Championship
2	2nd Annual PWG Bicentennial Birthday Extravaganza	July 9, 2005	Los Angeles, California	Hollywood-Los Feliz Jewish Community Center	A.J. Styles (c) vs. Frankie Kazarian for the PWG Championship
2	2nd Annual PWG Bicentennial Birthday Extravaganza	July 10, 2005	Los Angeles, California	Hollywood-Los Feliz Jewish Community Center	A.J. Styles (c) vs. Christopher Daniels vs. James Gibson in a Three-Way Dance for the PWG Championship
3	Threemendous	July 16, 2006	Los Angeles, California	Hollywood-Los Feliz Jewish Community Center	Joey Ryan (c) vs. B-Boy in a Battledome for the PWG World Championship
4	Giant-Size Annual #4	July 29, 2007	Burbank, California	Burbank Armory	El Generico (c) vs. Bryan Danielson for the PWG World Championship
5	Life During Wartime	July 6, 2008	Reseda, Los Angeles, California	American Legion Post #308	Human Tornado (c) vs. Chris Hero in a Steel Cage Guerrilla Warfare for the PWG World Championship
6	Threemendous II - Sixth Anniversary Event	July 31, 2009	Reseda, Los Angeles, California	American Legion Post #308	Chris Hero (c) vs. Joey Ryan in a Guerrilla Warfare for the PWG World Championship
7	Seven	July 30, 2010	Reseda, Los Angeles, California	American Legion Post #308	¡Peligro Abejas! (El Generico and Paul London) (c) vs. The Cutler Brothers (Brandon Cutler and Dustin Cutler) and The Young Bucks (Matt Jackson and Nick Jackson) in a Guerrilla Warfare for the PWG World Tag Team Championship
8	Eight	July 23, 2011	Reseda, Los Angeles, California	American Legion Post #308	Claudio Castagnoli (c) vs. Kevin Steen for the PWG World Championship
9	Threemendous III	July 21, 2012	Reseda, Los Angeles, California	American Legion Post #308	The Super Smash Brothers (Player Uno and Stupefied) (c) vs. Future Shock (Adam Cole and Kyle O'Reilly) and The Young Bucks (Matt Jackson and Nick Jackson) in a Ladder match for the PWG World Tag Team Championship
10	Ten	August 9, 2013	Reseda, Los Angeles, California	American Legion Post #308	The Young Bucks (Matt Jackson and Nick Jackson) (c) vs. The Dojo Bros (Eddie Edwards and Roderick Strong) and The Inner City Machine Guns (Rich Swann and Ricochet) in a Ladder match for the PWG World Tag Team Championship
11	Eleven	July 26, 2014	Reseda, Los Angeles, California	American Legion Post #308	The Young Bucks (Matt Jackson and Nick Jackson) (c) vs. World's Cutest Tag Team (Joey Ryan and Candice LeRae) in a Guerrilla Warfare for the PWG World Tag Team Championship
12	Threemendous IV	July 24, 2015	Reseda, Los Angeles, California	American Legion Post #308	The Young Bucks (Matt Jackson and Nick Jackson) (c) vs. Angelico and Jack Evans for the PWG World Tag Team Championship
13	Thirteen	July 29, 2016	Reseda, Los Angeles, California	American Legion Post #308	Zack Sabre Jr. (c) vs. Roderick Strong in a No Disqualification match for the PWG World Championship
14	Pushin Forward Back	July 7, 2017	Reseda, Los Angeles, California	American Legion Post #308	Zack Sabre Jr. (c) vs. Chuck Taylor for the PWG World Championship
15	Threemendous V	July 13, 2018	Los Angeles, California	Globe Theatre	WALTER (c) vs. Brody King for the PWG World Championship
16	Sixteen	July 26, 2019	Los Angeles, California	Globe Theatre	The Rascalz (Dezmond Xavier and Zachary Wentz) (c) vs. Latin American Xchange (Santana and Ortiz) in a Ladder match for the PWG World Tag Team Championship
17	Threemendous VI	September 26, 2021	Los Angeles, California	Globe Theatre	Bandido (c) vs. Davey Richards for the PWG World Championship
18	Nineteen	July 3, 2022	Los Angeles, California	Globe Theatre	Daniel Garcia (c) vs. Konosuke Takeshita for the PWG World Championship
19	Twenty: Mystery Vortex	August 13, 2023	Los Angeles, California	Globe Theatre	Daniel Garcia (c) vs. Mike Bailey in an Iron Man match for the PWG World Championship

== Results ==
=== The Reason for the Season ===
The Reason for the Season
- Promotion: Pro Wrestling Guerrilla
- Date: July 10, 2004
- City: Los Angeles, California
- Venue: Hollywood-Los Feliz Jewish Community Center
- Attendance: c.300

Event chronology
← Previous; Rocktoberfest	Next → The Secret of The Ooze!

Anniversary Show chronology
← Previous; First	Next → 2nd Annual PWG Bicentennial Birthday Extravaganza

No.	Results	Stipulations	Times
1	Los Rojo Locos (Shane Ballard and Shannon Ballard) and The Aerial Express (Quicksilver and Scorpio Sky) (with Dino Winwood) defeated Charles Mercury, Chris Bosh, Disco Machine and Top Gun Talwar	Eight-man tag team match	12:02
2	Puma defeated Brad Bradley	Singles match	6:28
3	A.J. Styles defeated Rocky Romero	Singles match	17:44
4	Colt Cabana defeated Babi Slymm (with C. Edward Vander Pyle) and Excalibur	Triangle elimination match to determine the #1 contender for the PWG Championship	11:28
5	Scott Lost defeated Joey Ryan	Singles match	19:18
6	Super Dragon defeated CM Punk	Singles match	27:29
7	Bryan Danielson and Christopher Daniels defeated Ricky Reyes and Samoa Joe	Tag team match	21:39
8	Frankie Kazarian defeated Adam Pearce (c)	Loser Leaves Town Steel Cage match for the PWG Championship	23:46
(c) / – the champion(s) heading into the match

=== 2nd Annual PWG Bicentennial Birthday Extravaganza ===
The match between Aerial Express and Arrogance on night one was awarded the 2005 Southern California Match of the Year Award by SoCal Uncensored.

2nd Annual PWG Bicentennial Birthday Extravaganza
- Promotion: Pro Wrestling Guerrilla
- Date: Night One: July 9, 2005; Night Two: July 10, 2005
- City: Los Angeles, California
- Venue: Hollywood-Los Feliz Jewish Community Center
- Attendance: Night One: c. 300; Night Two: c. 300; Combined: c.600

Event chronology
← Previous; Rocktoberfest	Next → The Secret of The Ooze!

Anniversary Show chronology
← Previous; The Reason for the Season	Next → Threemendous

Night One (July 9)
No.	Results	Stipulations	Times
1	Davey Richards defeated Shannon Ballard	Singles match	13:00
2	Los Luchas (Phoenix Star and Zokre) defeated HookGun (Hook Bomberry and Top Gun Talwar) (with Luscious)	Tag team match	12:02
3	Joey Ryan defeated Mr. Excitement	Singles match	9:51
4	Ricky Reyes defeated Petey Williams	Singles match	13:18
5	New SBS (Disco Machine, Excalibur and Kevin Steen) defeated El Generico, Human Tornado and Super Dragon	Six-man elimination tag team match	32:12
6	Christopher Daniels (c) defeated Chris Sabin	Singles match for the TNA X Division Championship	15:29
7	The Aerial Express (Quicksilver and Scorpio Sky) (with Dino Winwood) defeated Arrogance (Chris Bosh and Scott Lost) (c)	Masks vs. Title No Disqualification match for the PWG Tag Team Championship	26:55
8	AJ Styles (c) versus Frankie Kazarian ended in a double count-out	Singles match for the PWG Championship	21:32
(c) / – the champion(s) heading into the match

Night Two (July 10)
No.	Results	Stipulations	Times
1	Quicksilver (with Dino Winwood) defeated Ronin	Singles match	9:37
2	T.J. Perkins (with Rocky Romero) defeated Davey Richards	Singles match	14:28
3	Chris Sabin and Petey Williams defeated The X-Foundation (Joey Ryan and Scott Lost)	Tag team match	13:23
4	CM Punk defeated Ricky Reyes (with Rocky Romero)	Singles match	17:30
5	Kevin Steen defeated Super Dragon	Singles match to determine the #1 contender for the PWG Championship	26:00
6	Two Skinny Black Guys (El Generico and Human Tornado) defeated HookGun (Hook Bomberry and Top Gun Talwar), Los Luchas (Phoenix Star and Zokre) and Disco Machine and Excalibur	Four-Way elimination match to determine the #1 contenders for the PWG Tag Team Championship	22:43
7	AJ Styles (c) defeated Christopher Daniels and James Gibson	Three Way Dance for the PWG Championship	13:39
(c) / – the champion(s) heading into the match

=== Threemendous ===
Threemendous
- Promotion: Pro Wrestling Guerrilla
- Date: July 16, 2006
- City: Los Angeles, California
- Venue: Hollywood-Los Feliz Jewish Community Center
- Attendance: c.350

Event chronology
← Previous; From Parts Well Known	Next → Battle of Los Angeles

Anniversary Show chronology
← Previous; 2nd Annual PWG Bicentennial Birthday Extravaganza	Next → Giant-Size Annual #4

No.	Results	Stipulations	Times
1	Disco Machine defeated Excalibur	Singles match	8:30
2	Ronin defeated Nemesis	Singles match	7:06
3	Colt Cabana defeated Top Gun Talwar	Singles match	12:01
4	The Dynasty (Chris Bosh, Scorpio Sky and Scott Lost) (with Jade Chung) defeated Davey Richards, Human Tornado and Kevin Steen (with Candice LaRae)	Six-man tag team match	20:09
5	Roderick Strong defeated T.J. Perkins	Singles match	18:54
6	Kings of Wrestling (Chris Hero and Claudio Castagnoli) defeated Cape Fear (El Generico and Quicksilver)	Tag team match	20:46
7	Joey Ryan (c) defeated B-Boy	Battledome for the PWG World Championship	34:46
(c) / – the champion(s) heading into the match

=== Giant-Size Annual #4 ===
Giant-Size Annual #4
- Promotion: Pro Wrestling Guerrilla
- Date: July 29, 2007
- City: Burbank, California, California
- Venue: Burbank Armory
- Attendance: c.400

Event chronology
← Previous; Roger Dorn Night	Next → Battle of Los Angeles

Anniversary Show chronology
← Previous; Threemendous	Next → Life During Wartime

The match between Danielson and Generico was awarded the 2007 Southern California Match of the Year Award by SoCal Uncensored.

No.	Results	Stipulations	Times
1	Ronin defeated Top Gun Talwar	Singles match	7:08
2	Human Tornado (with Candice LeRae) defeated Tony Kozina	Singles match	11:44
3	T.J. Perkins and The Young Bucks (Matt Jackson and Nick Jackson) defeated Bino Gambino, Karl Anderson and Scott Lost	Six-man tag team match	13:50
4	Davey Richards defeated Fergal Devitt	Singles match	16:08
5	Scorpio Sky defeated Joey Ryan	Unsanctioned Street Fight	15:14
6	Austin Aries defeated Rocky Romero	Singles match to qualify for the Battle of Los Angeles tournament	15:36
7	Bryan Danielson defeated Necro Butcher by referee's decision	No Disqualification match	9:36
8	El Generico and Kevin Steen defeated PAC and Roderick Strong (c)	Tag team match for the PWG World Tag Team Championship	18:30
9	Bryan Danielson defeated El Generico (c)	Singles match for the PWG World Championship	11:40
(c) / – the champion(s) heading into the match

=== Life During Wartime ===
Life During Wartime
- Promotion: Pro Wrestling Guerrilla
- Date: July 6, 2008
- City: Reseda, California
- Venue: American Legion Post #308

Event chronology
← Previous; It's It (What Is It?)	Next → All Star Weekend 7

Anniversary Show chronology
← Previous; Giant-Size Annual #4	Next → Threemendous II - Sixth Anniversary Event

No.	Results	Stipulations	Times
1	Brandon Bonham defeated Arik Cannon	Singles match	—
2	Hook Bomberry and T.J. Perkins defeated Charles Mercury and Mikey Nicholls	Tag team match	—
3	Claudio Castagnoli defeated Phoenix Star	Singles match	—
4	Necro Butcher defeated Kikutaro	Singles match	—
5	The Young Bucks (Matt Jackson and Nick Jackson) defeated KAZMA and MIYAWAKI and The Dynasty (Joey Ryan and Scott Lost)	Three Way match	14:55
6	Scorpio Sky defeated Chris Bosh	Singles match	—
7	The Age of the Fall (Jimmy Jacobs and Tyler Black) defeated El Generico and Roderick Strong (c)	Tag team match for the PWG World Tag Team Championship	20:27
8	Chris Hero defeated Human Tornado (c)	Steel Cage Guerrilla Warfare for the PWG World Championship	—
(c) / – the champion(s) heading into the match

=== Threemendous II - Sixth Anniversary Event ===
Threemendous II - Sixth Anniversary Event
- Promotion: Pro Wrestling Guerrilla
- Date: July 31, 2009
- City: Reseda, California
- Venue: American Legion Post #308

Event chronology
← Previous; The Secret of Guerrilla Island	Next → Speed of Sound

Anniversary Show chronology
← Previous; Life During Wartime	Next → Seven

No.	Results	Stipulations	Times
1	Charles Mercury and The Cutler Brothers (Brandon Cutler and Dustin Cutler) defeated Brandon Gatson, Jerome Robinson and Johnny Goodtime	Six-man tag team match	16:48
2	Alex Shelley defeated Scott Lost	Singles match	16:13
3	Bryan Danielson defeated Chris Sabin	Singles match	17:55
4	Chuck Taylor defeated Colt Cabana	Singles match	11:12
5	Roderick Strong defeated Davey Richards	Singles match	12:38
6	Two Skinny Black Guys (El Generico and Human Tornado) defeated The Young Bucks (Matt Jackson and Nick Jackson)	Tag team match	19:53
7	Chris Hero (with Candice LaRae) (c) defeated Joey Ryan	Guerrilla Warfare for the PWG World Championship	43:20
(c) / – the champion(s) heading into the match

=== Seven ===
Seven
- Promotion: Pro Wrestling Guerrilla
- Date: July 30, 2010
- City: Reseda, California
- Venue: American Legion Post #308

Event chronology
← Previous; DIO!	Next → Battle of Los Angeles

Anniversary Show chronology
← Previous; Threemendous II - Sixth Anniversary Event	Next → Eight

No.	Results	Stipulations	Times
1	Brandon Gatson, Candice LeRae and Johnny Goodtime defeated Malachi Jackson, Peter Avalon and Ryan Taylor	Six-man tag team match	13:47
2	Brandon Bonham defeated Brian Cage	Singles match	16:16
3	Akira Tozawa defeated Chris Sabin	Singles match	11:57
4	Scorpio Sky defeated Scott Lost	Singles match This was Scott Lost's retirement match	21:40
5	Bryan Danielson defeated Roderick Strong	Singles match	12:52
6	Davey Richards (c) defeated Chris Hero	Singles match for the PWG World Championship	24:46
7	¡Peligro Abejas! (El Generico and Paul London) (c) defeated The Cutler Brothers (Brandon Cutler and Dustin Cutler) and The Young Bucks (Matt Jackson and Nick Jackson)	Three Way Guerrilla Warfare for the PWG World Tag Team Championship	20:53
(c) / – the champion(s) heading into the match

=== Eight ===
Eight
- Promotion: Pro Wrestling Guerrilla
- Date: July 23, 2011
- City: Reseda, California
- Venue: American Legion Post #308

Event chronology
← Previous; All Star Weekend 8	Next → Battle of Los Angeles

Anniversary Show chronology
← Previous; Seven	Next → Threemendous III

No.	Results	Stipulations	Times
1	Kevin Steen defeated PAC	Singles match	23:08
2	Brian Cage-Taylor defeated Brandon Gatson	Singles match	14:17
3	Alex Shelley and Roderick Strong defeated El Generico and Ricochet	Tag team match	22:06
4	Peter Avalon defeated Ryan Taylor	Singles match	12:06
5	The RockNES Monsters (Johnny Goodtime and Johnny Yuma) defeated The Dynasty (Joey Ryan and Scorpio Sky)	Tag team match	10:05
6	CIMA and Kevin Steen defeated The Young Bucks (Matt Jackson and Nick Jackson)	Tag team match	15:07
7	Claudio Castagnoli (c) defeated Chris Hero	Singles match for the PWG World Championship	36:54
8	Kevin Steen defeated Claudio Castagnoli (c)	Singles match for the PWG World Championship	1:38
(c) / – the champion(s) heading into the match

=== Threemendous III ===
Threemendous III
- Promotion: Pro Wrestling Guerrilla
- Date: July 21, 2012
- City: Reseda, California
- Venue: American Legion Post #308

Event chronology
← Previous; Death To All But Metal	Next → Battle of Los Angeles

Anniversary Show chronology
← Previous; Eight	Next → Ten

The three-way match between Super Smash Brothers, Future Shock and Young Bucks was awarded the 2012 Southern California Match of the Year Award by SoCal Uncensored.

No.	Results	Stipulations	Times
1	Joey Ryan defeated Famous B	Singles match	10:57
2	Roderick Strong defeated T.J. Perkins	Singles match	12:06
3	The RockNES Monsters (Johnny Goodtime and Johnny Yuma) defeated The Fightin' Taylor Boys (Chuck Taylor and Ryan Taylor)	Tag team match	16:49
4	Brian Cage defeated Eddie Edwards	Singles match	15:24
5	Kevin Steen (c) defeated Willie Mack	Singles match for the PWG World Championship	18:11
6	B-Boy defeated Drake Younger	Singles match	21:42
7	Michael Elgin defeated Sami Callihan	Singles match	15:47
8	The Super Smash Brothers (Player Uno and Stupefied) (c) defeated Future Shock (Adam Cole and Kyle O'Reilly) and The Young Bucks (Matt Jackson and Nick Jackson)	Three Way Ladder match for the PWG World Tag Team Championship	23:57
(c) / – the champion(s) heading into the match

=== Ten ===
Ten
- Promotion: Pro Wrestling Guerrilla
- Date: August 9, 2013
- City: Reseda, California
- Venue: American Legion Post #308

Event chronology
← Previous; Is Your Body Ready?	Next → Battle of Los Angeles

Anniversary Show chronology
← Previous; Threemendous III	Next → Eleven

The three-way match between Young Bucks, Dojo Bros and Inner City Machine Guns was awarded the 2013 Southern California Match of the Year Award by SoCal Uncensored.

No.	Results	Stipulations	Times
1	B-Boy, Candice LeRae and Willie Mack defeated Joey Ryan, Peter Avalon and Ryan Taylor	Six-man tag team match	16:10
2	Brian Cage defeated Anthony Nese	Singles match	12:52
3	Forever Hooligans (Alex Koslov and Rocky Romero) defeated RockNES Monsters (Johnny Goodtime and Johnny Yuma)	Tag team match	16:14
4	Michael Elgin defeated AR Fox	Singles match	18:39
5	Chuck Taylor and Johnny Gargano defeated Brian Kendrick and Paul London	Tag team match	16:05
6	Kyle O'Reilly defeated TJ Perkins	Singles match	21:53
7	Adam Cole (c) defeated Drake Younger and Kevin Steen	Three Way Guerrilla Warfare for the PWG World Championship	15:12
8	The Young Bucks (Matt Jackson and Nick Jackson) (c) defeated The Dojo Bros (Eddie Edwards and Roderick Strong) and The Inner City Machine Guns (Rich Swann and Ricochet)	Three Way Ladder match for the PWG World Tag Team Championship	17:42
(c) / – the champion(s) heading into the match

=== Eleven ===
Eleven
- Promotion: Pro Wrestling Guerrilla
- Date: July 26, 2014
- City: Reseda, California
- Venue: American Legion Post #308

Event chronology
← Previous; Sold Our Souls For Rock 'n Roll	Next → Battle of Los Angeles

Anniversary Show chronology
← Previous; Ten	Next → Threemendous IV

No.	Results	Stipulations	Times
1	Tommaso Ciampa defeated Rocky Romero	Singles match	12:27
2	ACH defeated Cedric Alexander	Singles match	23:30
3	Best Friends (Chuck Taylor and Trent) defeated Johnny Gargano and Michael Elgin	Tag team match to determine the #1 contenders for the PWG World Tag Team Championship	25:16
4	Trevor Lee defeated Kevin Steen	Singles match	15:24
5	Frankie Kazarian defeated Brian Kendrick	Singles match	15:59
6	Roderick Strong defeated Adam Cole	Singles match to determine the #1 contender for the PWG World Championship	13:17
7	Kyle O'Reilly (c) defeated Chris Hero	Singles match for the PWG World Championship	34:26
8	The World's Cutest Tag Team (Candice LeRae and Joey Ryan) defeated The Young Bucks (Matt Jackson and Nick Jackson) (c)	Guerrilla Warfare for the PWG World Tag Team Championship	20:33
(c) / – the champion(s) heading into the match

=== Threemendous IV ===
Threemendous IV
- Promotion: Pro Wrestling Guerrilla
- Date: July 24, 2015
- City: Reseda, California
- Venue: American Legion Post #308

Event chronology
← Previous; Mystery Vortex III: Rock And Shock The Nation	Next → Battle of Los Angeles

Anniversary Show chronology
← Previous; Eleven	Next → Thirteen

No.	Results	Stipulations	Times
1	Team Tremendous (Bill Carr and Dan Barry) defeated The World's Cutest Tag Team (Candice LeRae and Joey Ryan)	Tag team match	9:01
2	Brian Cage defeated Johnny Gargano	Singles match	11:28
3	Andrew Everett defeated Rich Swann	Singles match	15:45
4	Trevor Lee defeated Tommaso Ciampa	Singles match	14:53
5	Mike Bailey defeated Chris Hero	Singles match	20:55
6	Ricochet defeated Akira Tozawa	Singles match	16:46
7	The Young Bucks (Matt Jackson and Nick Jackson) (c) defeated Angélico and Jack Evans	Tag team match for the PWG World Tag Team Championship	14:25
(c) / – the champion(s) heading into the match

=== Thirteen ===
Thirteen
- Promotion: Pro Wrestling Guerrilla
- Date: July 29, 2016
- City: Reseda, California
- Venue: American Legion Post #308

Event chronology
← Previous; Prince	Next → Battle of Los Angeles

Anniversary Show chronology
← Previous; Threemendous IV	Next → Pushin Forward Back

No.	Results	Stipulations	Times
1	Adam Cole defeated Brian Cage	Singles match	11:43
2	Roderick Strong defeated Timothy Thatcher	Singles match	10:48
3	Jeff Cobb defeated Trevor Lee	Singles match	11:20
4	Chuck Taylor defeated Trent	Singles match	15:47
5	Marty Scurll defeated Sami Callihan	Singles match	20:23
6	The Young Bucks (Matt Jackson and Nick Jackson) (c) defeated Death By Elbow (Chris Hero and J.T. Dunn)	Tag team match for the PWG World Tag Team Championship	22:26
7	Zack Sabre Jr. (c) defeated Kyle O'Reilly	Singles match for the PWG World Championship	22:00
8	Zack Sabre Jr. (c) defeated Roderick Strong	No Disqualification match for the PWG World Championship	5:30
(c) / – the champion(s) heading into the match

=== Pushin Forward Back ===
Pushin Forward Back
- Promotion: Pro Wrestling Guerrilla
- Date: July 7, 2017
- City: Reseda, California
- Venue: American Legion Post #308

Event chronology
← Previous; Man on the Silver Mountain	Next → Battle of Los Angeles

Anniversary Show chronology
← Previous; Thirteen	Next → Threemendous V

No.	Results	Stipulations	Times
1	Sammy Guevara defeated Rey Horus	Singles match	19:09
2	The Unbreakable F'N Machines (Brian Cage and Michael Elgin) defeated The Young Bucks (Matt Jackson and Nick Jackson)	Tag team match	18:25
3	Keith Lee defeated Lio Rush and Trent	Three Way match	22:10
4	Dezmond Xavier defeated Dave Crist, Jake Crist and Sami Callihan	Four Way match	10:04
5	Ricochet defeated Trevor Lee	Singles match	14:44
6	Chuck Taylor defeated Zack Sabre Jr. (c)	Singles match for the PWG World Championship	29:22
(c) / – the champion(s) heading into the match

=== Threemendous V ===
Threemendous V
- Promotion: Pro Wrestling Guerrilla
- Date: July 13, 2018
- City: Los Angeles, California
- Venue: Globe Theatre

Event chronology
← Previous; Bask in His Glory	Next → Battle of Los Angeles

Anniversary Show chronology
← Previous; Pushin Forward Back	Next → Sixteen

No.	Results	Stipulations	Times
1	Dalton Castle defeated David Starr	Singles match	14:26
2	Rey Horus defeated Penta El Zero M	Singles match	13:10
3	Jeff Cobb defeated Joey Janela	Singles match	15:13
4	The Rascalz (Dezmond Xavier and Zachary Wentz) (c) defeated The Young Bucks (Matt Jackson and Nick Jackson)	Tag team match for the PWG World Tag Team Championship	17:23
5	Rey Fenix defeated Trevor Lee	Singles match	12:21
6	Matt Riddle defeated Marty Scurll	Singles match	10:43
7	WALTER (c) defeated Brody King	Singles match for the PWG World Championship	18:21
(c) / – the champion(s) heading into the match

=== Sixteen ===
Sixteen
- Promotion: Pro Wrestling Guerrilla
- Date: July 26, 2019
- City: Los Angeles, California
- Venue: Globe Theatre

Event chronology
← Previous; Mystery Vortex VI	Next → Battle of Los Angeles

Anniversary Show chronology
← Previous; Threemendous V	Next → Threemendous VI

The luchador six-man tag team match pitting Bandido, Flamita and Rey Horus against Black Taurus, Laredo Kid and Puma King was awarded the 2019 Southern California Match of the Year Award by SoCal Uncensored.

No.	Results	Stipulations	Times
1	Trey Miguel defeated Andy Brown	Singles match	8:05
2	The Dark Order (Evil Uno and Stu Grayson) defeated Best Friends (Chuck Taylor and Trent) by disqualification	Tag team match	15:21
3	Darby Allin defeated MJF	Singles match	12:30
4	Bandido, Flamita and Rey Horus defeated Black Taurus, Laredo Kid and Puma King	Six-man tag team match	14:12
5	Joey Janela defeated Jungle Boy (with Luchasaurus)	Singles match	12:12
6	Brody King defeated David Starr	Singles match	14:28
7	The Rascalz (Dezmond Xavier and Zachary Wentz) (c) defeated Latin American Xchange (Ortiz and Santana)	Ladder match for the PWG World Tag Team Championship	15:19
(c) / – the champion(s) heading into the match

=== Threemendous VI ===
Threemendous VI
- Promotion: Pro Wrestling Guerrilla
- Date: September 26, 2021
- City: Los Angeles, California
- Venue: Globe Theatre
- Attendance: c.600

Event chronology
← Previous; Mystery Vortex 7	Next → It's A Long Way To The Top (If You Wanna Rock 'n' Roll)

Anniversary Show chronology
← Previous; Sixteen	Next → Nineteen

No.	Results	Stipulations	Times
1	Evil Uno defeated Tony Deppen	Singles match	11:44
2	Dragon Lee defeated Aramis	Singles match	12:43
3	Alex Shelley defeated Jonathan Gresham	Singles match to determine the #1 contender for the PWG World Championship	16:07
4	Alex Zayne, Dante Martin and Jack Cartwheel defeated Lee Moriarty, Myron Reed and Trey Miguel	Six-man tag team match	16:57
5	JD Drake defeated AJ Gray	Singles match	11:38
6	The Kings of the Black Throne (Brody King and Malakai Black) defeated Black Taurus and Demonic Flamita	Tag team match for the vacant PWG World Tag Team Championship	11:29
7	Bandido (c) defeated Davey Richards	Singles match for the PWG World Championship	15:27
(c) / – the champion(s) heading into the match

=== Nineteen ===
Nineteen
- Promotion: Pro Wrestling Guerrilla
- Date: July 3, 2022
- City: Los Angeles, California
- Venue: Globe Theatre

Event chronology
← Previous; Delivering The Goods	Next → DINK

Anniversary Show chronology
← Previous; Threemendous VI	Next → Twenty: Mystery Vortex

No.	Results	Stipulations	Times
1	Shane Haste defeated Titus Alexander	Singles match	9:18
2	Yuka Sakazaki defeated Masha Slamovich	Singles match	9:22
3	Davey Richards defeated JONAH and Kevin Blackwood	Three Way match	10:42
4	Mike Bailey defeated Buddy Matthews	Singles match	13:20
5	The Kings of the Black Throne (Brody King and Malakai Black) (c) defeated Aussie Open (Kyle Fletcher and Mark Davis)	Tag team match for the PWG World Tag Team Championship	18:02
6	Daniel Garcia (c) defeated Konosuke Takeshita	Singles match for the PWG World Championship	23:19
(c) / – the champion(s) heading into the match
