= Battle of Los Angeles (2018) =

2018 professional wrestling tournament by PWG

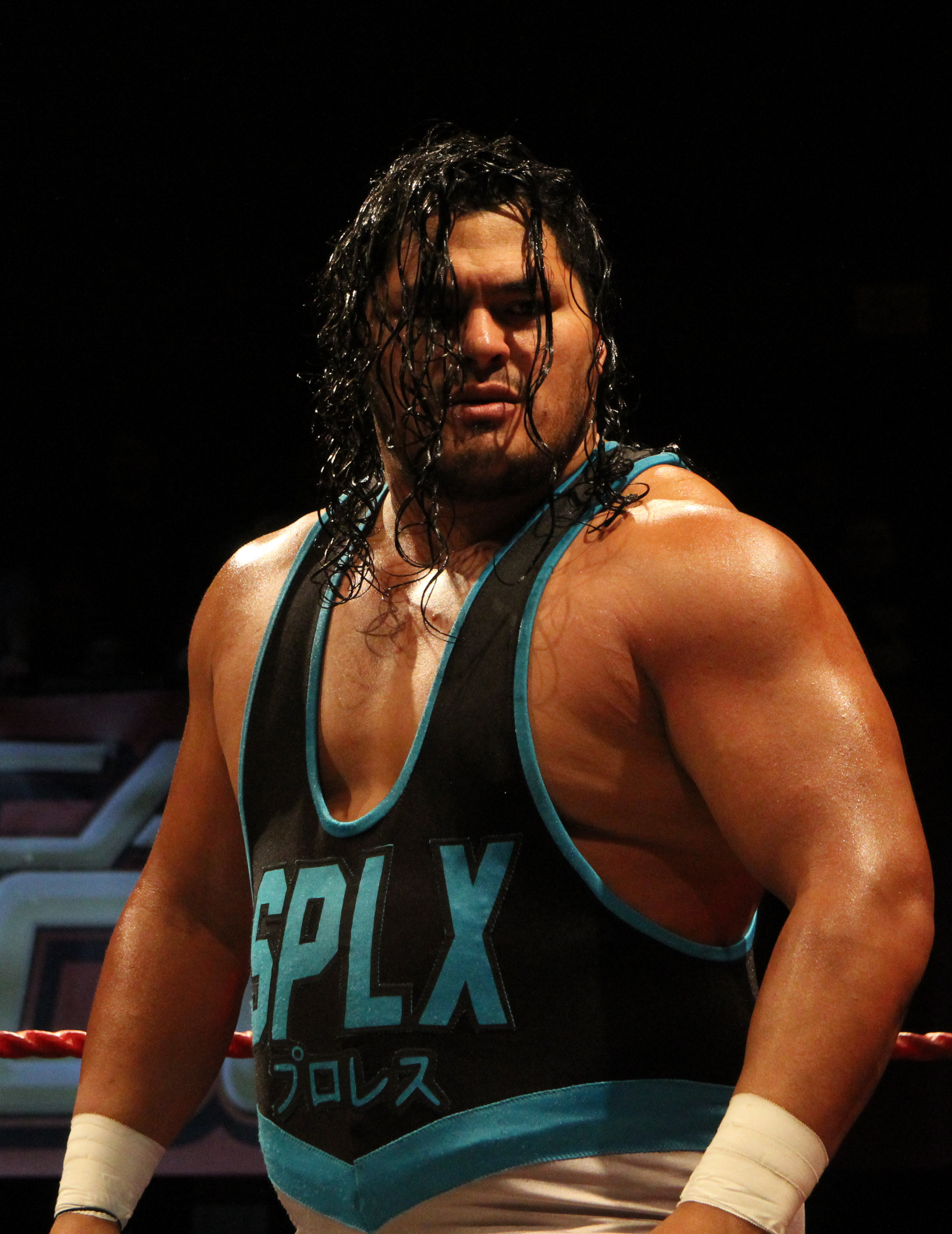
- The 2018 tournament winner Jeff Cobb
- Promotion: Pro Wrestling Guerrilla
- Date: Night One: September 14, 2018; Night Two: September 15, 2018; Night Three: September 16, 2018
- City: Los Angeles, California
- Venue: Globe Theatre

Event chronology
← Previous; Threemendous V	Next → Smokey and the Bandido

Battle of Los Angeles chronology
← Previous; 2017	Next → 2019

Battle of Los Angeles (2018) was the fifteenth Battle of Los Angeles professional wrestling tournament produced by Pro Wrestling Guerrilla (PWG). It was a three-night event which took place on September 14, September 15 and September 16, 2018 at the Globe Theatre in Los Angeles, California.

The twenty-four man tournament concluded with a three-way elimination match in the final, in which Jeff Cobb defeated Bandido and Shingo Takagi. Several non-tournament matches took place during three nights.

On the night one, Ringkampf (Timothy Thatcher and WALTER) defeated Ilja Dragunov and Shingo Takagi in the main event. On the night two, CIMA and The Rascalz (Dezmond Xavier and Zachary Wentz) defeated Bandido, Flamita and Rey Horus in a six-man tag team match in the main event. On the third night, The Rascalz defeated The Lucha Brothers (Rey Fenix and Penta El Zero M) to retain the World Tag Team Championship and Dan Barry, Darby Allin, Jody Fleisch, PCO and Puma King defeated Adam Brooks, David Starr, DJZ, T-Hawk and Timothy Thatcher in a ten-man tag team match.

== Background ==
On May 3, 2018, PWG revealed the dates and venue of the 2018 Battle of Los Angeles tournament via its official Twitter account. PWG completed the lineup of the twenty-four participants of the tournament in June. Originally, Matthew Riddle was announced as a participant, but he was replaced by Trevor Lee. Travis Banks was also a participant, but he was pulled off due to an injury and was replaced by Sammy Guevara. Chris Brookes would also be pulled from the tournament due to an injury and was replaced by Marko Stunt.

== Event ==
=== Night One ===
The 2018 Battle of Los Angeles tournament kicked off with a match between Rey Horus and Adam Brooks. Horus pinned Brooks with a wheelbarrow victory roll from the top rope.

Next, Flamita took on Puma King. Flamita delivered a corkscrew 450° splash to King for the win.

Next, CIMA took on Jody Fleisch. CIMA delivered a Meteora to Fleisch for the win.

Next, Bandido took on T-Hawk. Bandido delivered a Revolution Fly to T-Hawk for the win.

Next, Joey Janela took on David Starr. Janela delivered a superkick to Starr for the win.

Next, PCO took on Brody King. King pulled PCO off the top rope and delivered a Gonzo Bomb to PCO for the win.

It was followed by a tag team match in the main event, in which Ilja Dragunov and Shingo Takagi took on Ringkampf (Timothy Thatcher and World Champion WALTER). Thatcher pinned Dragunov with a roll-up for the win.

=== Night Two ===
The first round of the Battle of Los Angeles continued in the second night with a match between Trevor Lee and Marko Stunt. Lee delivered a Cave-In to Stunt for the win.

Next, Jonah Rock took on Sammy Guevara. Rock won the match by applying a guillotine choke on Guevara for the win.

Next, DJZ made his PWG debut against Robbie Eagles. Eagles delivered a 450° splash on DJZ's leg and inflicted pain on his leg by applying a Ron Miller Special on DJZ and made him submit for the win.

Next, Jeff Cobb took on Darby Allin. Cobb delivered a German suplex to Allin for the win.

Next, Shingo Takagi took on Ilja Dragunov. Takagi delivered a Made in Japan to Dragunov for a near-fall and then he delivered a lariat in the corner to Dragunov and followed it with a second Made in Japan for the win.

Next, WALTER took on Timothy Thatcher. WALTER delivered a lariat to Thatcher for the win.

It was followed by a six-man tag team match in the main event, in which CIMA teamed with the World Tag Team Champions The Rascalz (Dezmond Xavier and Zachary Wentz) to take on Bandido, Flamita and Rey Horus. CIMA delivered a Meteora to Bandido from the top rope and then CIMA and Rascalz together pinned him for the win.

=== Night Three ===
Quarterfinals

The quarterfinal round of the Battle of Los Angeles began with a match between Brody King and Trevor Lee. Lee delivered a Collision Course to King for the win.

Next, Jeff Cobb took on Rey Horus. Cobb delivered a Tour of the Islands to Horus for the win.

Next, Shingo Takagi took on Robbie Eagles. Takagi applied a rear naked choke on Eagles and made him submit to the hold for the win.

Next, CIMA took on Joey Janela. Janela delivered a superkick to CIMA for the win.

Next, WALTER took on Jonah Rock. WALTER delivered a powerbomb to Rock for the win.

It was followed by the last match in the quarterfinal round between Bandido and Flamita. Bandido delivered a springboard 21 Plex to Flamita for the win.

Next, The Rascalz defended the World Tag Team Championship against The Lucha Brothers (Rey Fenix and Penta El Zero M). Zachary Wentz delivered an assisted moonsault to Fenix for the win.

Semifinals

The semifinal round began with a match between Jeff Cobb and Trevor Lee. Lee interrupted Cobb's entrance to the ring by mocking him with a promo but Cobb attacked him and delivered a Tour of the Worlds to Lee for the win.

Next, Bandido took on Joey Janela. Janela set up steel chairs in the corner and tried to deliver a package piledriver to Bandido from the top rope but Bandido countered it by hitting a Revolution Fly for the win.

It was followed by the last semifinal match between WALTER and Shingo Takagi. After failing to drop WALTER down with a series of clotheslines, Takagi delivered a Pumping Bomber to WALTER for the win.

Next, a ten-man tag team match took place in which the team of PCO, Darby Allin, Puma King, Dan Barry and Jody Fleisch took on Timothy Thatcher, David Starr, T-Hawk, DJZ and Adam Brooks. PCO delivered a senton from the top rope to Barry while Thatcher had applied a choke on Barry. PCO then pinned Barry for the win.

Final

The final of the Battle of Los Angeles was a three-way elimination match in which Bandido took on Jeff Cobb and Shingo Takagi. After Takagi knocked Cobb out of the ring by hitting a Pumping Bomber, he battled Bandido on the top rope and Bandido delivered a Revolution Fly to Takagi to eliminate him, leaving the contest to Bandido and Cobb. Cobb countered a Revolution Fly attempt by Bandido from the top rope by delivering a Tour of the Islands to Bandido from the top rope and followed it by hitting a second Tour of the Islands to win the 2018 Battle of Los Angeles.

== Aftermath ==
After winning the Battle of Los Angeles, Jeff Cobb received a title shot against WALTER for the PWG World Championship at Smokey and the Bandido, which he won.

== Results ==
Night 1 (September 14)
No.	Results	Stipulations	Times
1	Rey Horus defeated Adam Brooks	Singles match in the first round of Battle of Los Angeles tournament	20:33
2	Flamita defeated Puma King	Singles match in the first round of Battle of Los Angeles tournament	12:13
3	CIMA defeated Jody Fleisch	Singles match in the first round of Battle of Los Angeles tournament	16:35
4	Bandido defeated T-Hawk	Singles match in the first round of Battle of Los Angeles tournament	12:18
5	Joey Janela defeated David Starr	Singles match in the first round of Battle of Los Angeles tournament	15:59
6	Brody King defeated PCO	Singles match in the first round of Battle of Los Angeles tournament	11:22
7	Ringkampf (Timothy Thatcher and WALTER) defeated Ilja Dragunov and Shingo Takagi	Tag team match	22:18

Night 2 (September 15)
No.	Results	Stipulations	Times
1	Trevor Lee defeated Marko Stunt	Singles match in the first round of Battle of Los Angeles tournament	9:11
2	Jonah Rock defeated Sammy Guevara	Singles match in the first round of Battle of Los Angeles tournament	12:14
3	Robbie Eagles defeated DJZ	Singles match in the first round of Battle of Los Angeles tournament	11:54
4	Jeff Cobb defeated Darby Allin	Singles match in the first round of Battle of Los Angeles tournament	9:57
5	Shingo Takagi defeated Ilja Dragunov	Singles match in the first round of Battle of Los Angeles tournament	16:20
6	WALTER defeated Timothy Thatcher	Singles match in the first round of Battle of Los Angeles tournament	18:05
7	CIMA and The Rascalz (Dezmond Xavier and Zachary Wentz) defeated Bandido, Flamita and Rey Horus	Six-man tag team match	11:49

Night 3 (September 16)
No.	Results	Stipulations	Times
1	Trevor Lee defeated Brody King	Sing6les match in the quarter-final round of Battle of Los Angeles tournament	14:17
2	Jeff Cobb defeated Rey Horus	Singles match in the quarter-final round of Battle of Los Angeles tournament	9:05
3	Shingo Takagi defeated Robbie Eagles	Singles match in the quarter-final round of Battle of Los Angeles tournament	9:59
4	Joey Janela defeated CIMA	Singles match in the quarter-final round of Battle of Los Angeles tournament	14:30
5	WALTER defeated Jonah Rock	Singles match in the quarter-final round of Battle of Los Angeles tournament	5:28
6	Bandido defeated Flamita	Singles match in the quarter-final round of Battle of Los Angeles tournament	11:02
7	The Rascalz (Dezmond Xavier and Zachary Wentz) (c) defeated The Lucha Brothers (Rey Fenix and Penta El Zero M)	Tag team match for the PWG World Tag Team Championship	11:13
8	Jeff Cobb defeated Trevor Lee	Singles match in the semi-final round of Battle of Los Angeles tournament	0:14
9	Bandido defeated Joey Janela	Singles match in the semi-final round of Battle of Los Angeles tournament	14:27
10	Shingo Takagi defeated WALTER	Singles match in the semi-final round of Battle of Los Angeles tournament	17:21
11	Dan Barry, Darby Allin, Jody Fleisch, PCO and Puma King defeated Adam Brooks, David Starr, DJZ, T-Hawk and Timothy Thatcher	Ten-man tag team match	18:17
12	Jeff Cobb defeated Bandido and Shingo Takagi (Note: Eliminations were as follows: Eliminated / Wrestler / Eliminated by / Elimination Method / Time; 1 / Shingo Takagi / Bandido / Pinfall / 9:12; 2 / Bandido / Jeff Cobb / Pinfall / 24:04; 3 / Winner: / Jeff Cobb)	Three Way Elimination match in the Battle of Los Angeles tournament final	24:04
(c) / – the champion(s) heading into the match

=== Tournament brackets ===
Battle of Los Angeles (2018)
Tournament information
- Sport: Professional wrestling
- Location: Reseda, Los Angeles, California
- Dates: September 14, 2018–September 16, 2018
- Tournament format: Single elimination tournament
- Participants: 24

Final positions
- Champion: Jeff Cobb
- 1st runner-up: Bandido
- 2nd runner-up: Shingo Takagi

First round
Rey Horus	Pin
Adam Brooks	20:33
Jeff Cobb	Pin
Darby Allin	9:57
PCO	Pin
Brody King	11:22
Trevor Lee	Pin
Marko Stunt	9:11

Quarterfinals
Rey Horus	Pin
Jeff Cobb	9:05
Brody King	Pin
Trevor Lee	14:17

Semifinals
Jeff Cobb	Pin
Trevor Lee	0:14

First round
Flamita	Pin
Puma King	12:13
T-Hawk	Pin
Bandido	12:18
Jody Fleisch	Pin
CIMA	16:35
David Starr	Pin
Joey Janela	15:59

Quarterfinals
Flamita	Pin
Bandido	11:02
CIMA	Sub
Joey Janela	14:30

Semifinals
Bandido	Pin
Joey Janela	14:27

First round
Sammy Guevara	Sub
Jonah Rock	12:14
WALTER	Pin
Timothy Thatcher	18:05
Shingo Takagi	Pin
Ilja Dragunov	16:20
DJZ	Sub
Robbie Eagles	11:54

Quarterfinals
Jonah Rock	Pin
WALTER	5:28
Shingo Takagi	Sub
Robbie Eagles	9:59

Semifinals
WALTER	Pin
Shingo Takagi	17:21

Final
Jeff Cobb	Win
Bandido Shingo Takagi	24:04
