= Fireball (nickname) =

As a nickname, Fireball or the Fireball may refer to:

- Jim Colzie (1920–2010), Negro league baseball pitcher
- Fireball Roberts (1929–1964), NASCAR driver born Edward Glenn Roberts Jr.
- Josh Urbiztondo (born 1983), Filipino-American Philippine Basketball Association player nicknamed "The Fireball"
- Fred Wenz (1941–2020), Major League Baseball middle relief pitcher

== See also ==
- Fireball (disambiguation)
