= Ball of Fire (disambiguation) =

Ball of Fire (also known as The Professor and the Burlesque Queen) is a 1941 comedy film. '"Ball(s) of Fire" may also refer to:

== Music ==
- "Ball of Fire" (song), by Tommy James and the Shondells
- Ball of Fire (album), an album by Jamaican ska band the Skatalites
- Balls of Fire, a 1976 album by Southern rock band Black Oak Arkansas

== Other ==
- 5th Indian Division in World War II, nicknamed Ball of Fire

== See also ==
- Great Balls of Fire (disambiguation)
- Fireball (disambiguation)
