= Battle of Los Angeles (2017) =

2017 professional wrestling tournament by PWG

- Promotion: Pro Wrestling Guerrilla
- Date: Night One: September 1, 2017; Night Two: September 2, 2017; Night Three: September 3, 2017
- City: Reseda, Los Angeles, California
- Venue: American Legion Post #308

Event chronology
← Previous; Pushin Forward Back	Next → All Star Weekend 13

Battle of Los Angeles chronology
← Previous; 2016	Next → 2018

Battle of Los Angeles (2017) was the fourteenth Battle of Los Angeles professional wrestling tournament produced by Pro Wrestling Guerrilla (PWG). It was a three-night event which took place on September 1, September 2 and September 3, 2017 at the American Legion Post #308 in Reseda, Los Angeles, California.

The twenty-four man tournament concluded with a three-way elimination match in the final, in which Ricochet defeated Jeff Cobb and Keith Lee. This made Ricochet, the first person to win the Battle of Los Angeles tournament twice, having won for the first time in 2014.

== Background ==
TK Cooper was originally announced for the tournament, but had to pull out due to an injury and was replaced by Joey Janela.

== Reception ==
Jake St-Pierre of 411Mania rated the night one 7.5, praising it as "an emphatic hit" with "sheer variety of styles throughout it". He said that "Crazy lucha is represented with Rey Horus and Fenix, all the way to Big Lads Wrestling with the Monstars vs. The Chosen Bros" He rated the night two 8.0, considering it "a fantastic few hours of pro wrestling", with specific praise towards Joey Janela and Sammy Guevara's match as "one of the most surprisingly quality matches of PWG's 2017." He rated the night three 8.5 stating that it was "a standalone show as well as a capper to this huge weekend". He further stated that "Not only did some of the most memorable moments of the tournament come on Stage 3, but we got North America's Best Match of the Year in Keith Lee vs. Donovan Dijak. That match alone strengthens this show to an unbelievable degree despite some slightly uninspiring Semifinal matches." He said that there were "huge highlights strewn across all three shows, like Janela/Guevara, Travis Banks in general, Keith Lee going on a bender, and the underrated match between Pentagon and Matt Riddle." He rated that the overall shows of the tournament were "damn good three days of pro wrestling that no wrestling fan in their right mind should avoid."

Kevin Pantoja of 411Mania rated the night one 7.0, having "a lot of good sandwiched in between some very average bookends." He stated that "The show opened in decent fashion and closed in disappointment", with "a fair amount to like". He felt "Sabre/Rock told a great story and established Rock in PWG. Penta/Sydal was solid, though could be skipped. Webster/Scurll and Fenix/Horus were battles of guys who knew each other well and it made for high quality matches. The show stealer was the Monstars/Chosen Bros tag and ranks as the only must see match of the night." He rated the night two 8.5, stating that it "delivered" with "not a single bad match on this show". He said that there were "strong tournament matches with the two big tags very well" and the "final two matches were the standouts and they’re both totally different from one another, which is great." He rated the night three 8.5 as "The best of the final BOLA stages", with the overall event being "consistently fun, with nothing being bad" and "Banks/Ricochet and Lee/Dijak were the show stealers".

The quarter-final match between Keith Lee and Donovan Dijak on the night three was awarded the prestigious 5-star rating by Dave Meltzer.

== Aftermath ==
Due to winning the 2017 Battle of Los Angeles, Ricochet received a PWG World Championship title shot against Chuck Taylor at All Star Weekend 13, which he won.

== Results ==
Night 1 (September 1)
No.	Results	Stipulations	Times
1	Dezmond Xavier defeated Brian Cage	Singles match in the first round of Battle of Los Angeles tournament	10:41
2	Marty Scurll defeated Flash Morgan Webster	Singles match in the first round of Battle of Los Angeles tournament	15:34
3	Rey Fenix defeated Rey Horus	Singles match in the first round of Battle of Los Angeles tournament	16:07
4	Chosen Bros (Jeff Cobb and Matthew Riddle) defeated Donovan Dijak and Keith Lee	Tag team match	18:25
5	Penta El Zero M defeated Matt Sydal	Singles match in the first round of Battle of Los Angeles tournament	11:05
6	Zack Sabre Jr. defeated Jonah Rock	Singles match in the first round of Battle of Los Angeles tournament	18:07
7	Ricochet defeated Flamita	Singles match in the first round of Battle of Los Angeles tournament	22:11

Night 2 (September 2)
No.	Results	Stipulations	Times
1	Donovan Dijak defeated Trevor Lee	Singles match in the first round of Battle of Los Angeles tournament	11:34
2	Sammy Guevara defeated Joey Janela	Singles match in the first round of Battle of Los Angeles tournament	14:30
3	Travis Banks defeated Mark Haskins	Singles match in the first round of Battle of Los Angeles tournament	16:58
4	The Leaders Of The New School (Marty Scurll and Zack Sabre Jr.) defeated Matt Sydal and Ricochet	Tag team match	20:56
5	Jeff Cobb defeated Sami Callihan	Singles match in the first round of Battle of Los Angeles tournament	11:41
6	Matthew Riddle defeated Michael Elgin	Singles match in the first round of Battle of Los Angeles tournament	17:59
7	Keith Lee defeated WALTER	Singles match in the first round of Battle of Los Angeles tournament	19:44
8	The Elite (Kenny Omega and The Young Bucks (Matt Jackson and Nick Jackson)) defeated Flamita, Penta El Zero M and Rey Fenix	Six-man tag team match	27:06

Night 3 (September 3)
No.	Results	Stipulations	Times
1	Ricochet defeated Dezmond Xavier	Singles match in the quarter-final round of Battle of Los Angeles tournament	10:47
2	Travis Banks defeated Marty Scurll	Singles match in the quarter-final round of Battle of Los Angeles tournament	13:52
3	Keith Lee defeated Donovan Dijak	Singles match in the quarter-final round of Battle of Los Angeles tournament	21:42
4	Rey Fenix defeated Zack Sabre Jr.	Singles match in the quarter-final round of Battle of Los Angeles tournament	14:34
5	Jeff Cobb defeated Sammy Guevara	Singles match in the quarter-final round of Battle of Los Angeles tournament	5:11
6	Matthew Riddle defeated Penta El Zero M	Singles match in the quarter-final round of Battle of Los Angeles tournament	14:18
7	Ricochet defeated Travis Banks	Singles match in the semi-final round of Battle of Los Angeles tournament	12:19
8	Keith Lee defeated Rey Fenix	Singles match in the semi-final round of Battle of Los Angeles tournament	9:35
9	Jeff Cobb defeated Matthew Riddle	Singles match in the semi-final round of Battle of Los Angeles tournament	9:05
10	Chuck Taylor, Flamita, Joey Janela, Mark Haskins and Morgan Webster defeated Brian Cage, Jonah Rock, Sami Callihan, Trevor Lee and WALTER	Ten-man tag team match	23:20
11	Ricochet defeated Jeff Cobb and Keith Lee (Note: Eliminations were as follows: Eliminated / Wrestler / Eliminated by / Elimination Method / Time; 1 / Jeff Cobb / Keith Lee / Pinfall / 18:47; 2 / Keith Lee / Ricochet / Pinfall / 19:00; 3 / Winner: / Ricochet)	Three Way Elimination match in the Battle of Los Angeles tournament final	19:00

=== Tournament brackets ===
Battle of Los Angeles (2017)
Tournament information
- Sport: Professional wrestling
- Location: Reseda, Los Angeles, California
- Dates: September 1, 2017–September 3, 2017
- Tournament format(s): Single elimination tournament
- Participants: 24

Final positions
- Champion: Ricochet
- 1st runner-up: Keith Lee
- 2nd runner-up: Jeff Cobb

First round
Brian Cage	Pin
Dezmond Xavier	10:41
Flamita	Pin
Ricochet	22:11
Flash Morgan Webster	Sub
Marty Scurll	15:34
Mark Haskins	Pin
Travis Banks	16:58

Quarterfinals
Dezmond Xavier	Pin
Ricochet	10:47
Marty Scurll	Pin
Travis Banks	13:52

Semifinals
Ricochet	Pin
Travis Banks	12:19

First round
Joey Janela	Pin
Sammy Guevara	14:30
Jeff Cobb	Pin
Sami Callihan	11:41
Matt Sydal	Pin
Penta el Zero M	11:05
Matthew Riddle	Pin
Michael Elgin	17:59

Quarterfinals
Sammy Guevara	Pin
Jeff Cobb	5:11
Penta el Zero M	Sub
Matthew Riddle	14:18

Semifinals
Jeff Cobb	Pin
Matthew Riddle	9:05

First round
Jonah Rock	Sub
Zack Sabre Jr.	18:07
Rey Fenix	Sub
Rey Horus	16:07
Donovan Dijak	Pin
Trevor Lee	11:34
Keith Lee	Pin
Walter	19:44

Quarterfinals
Zack Sabre Jr.	Pin
Rey Fenix	14:34
Donovan Dijak	Pin
Keith Lee	21:42

Semifinals
Rey Fenix	Pin
Keith Lee	9:35

Final
Ricochet	Win
Jeff Cobb Keith Lee	19:00
