= Great Balls of Fire (disambiguation) =

"Great Balls of Fire" is a 1957 song by Jerry Lee Lewis.

- "The Great Ball of Fire" is an extended play by Lewis released the same year
- Great Balls of Fire! (film), a 1989 American biographical film about Lewis

Great Balls of Fire may also refer to:

- Great Balls of Fire (Mae West album), 1972
- Great Balls of Fire (Dolly Parton album), 1979
- WWE Great Balls of Fire, a professional wrestling event produced by WWE, 2017

== See also ==
- 1972 Great Daylight Fireball (10 August 1972) meteor
- Ball of Fire (disambiguation)
- Fireball (disambiguation)
