= Globe Theatre (Los Angeles) =

Historic theatre and multipurpose space in Downtown Los Angeles

- Globe Theater
- U.S. Historic district – Contributing property
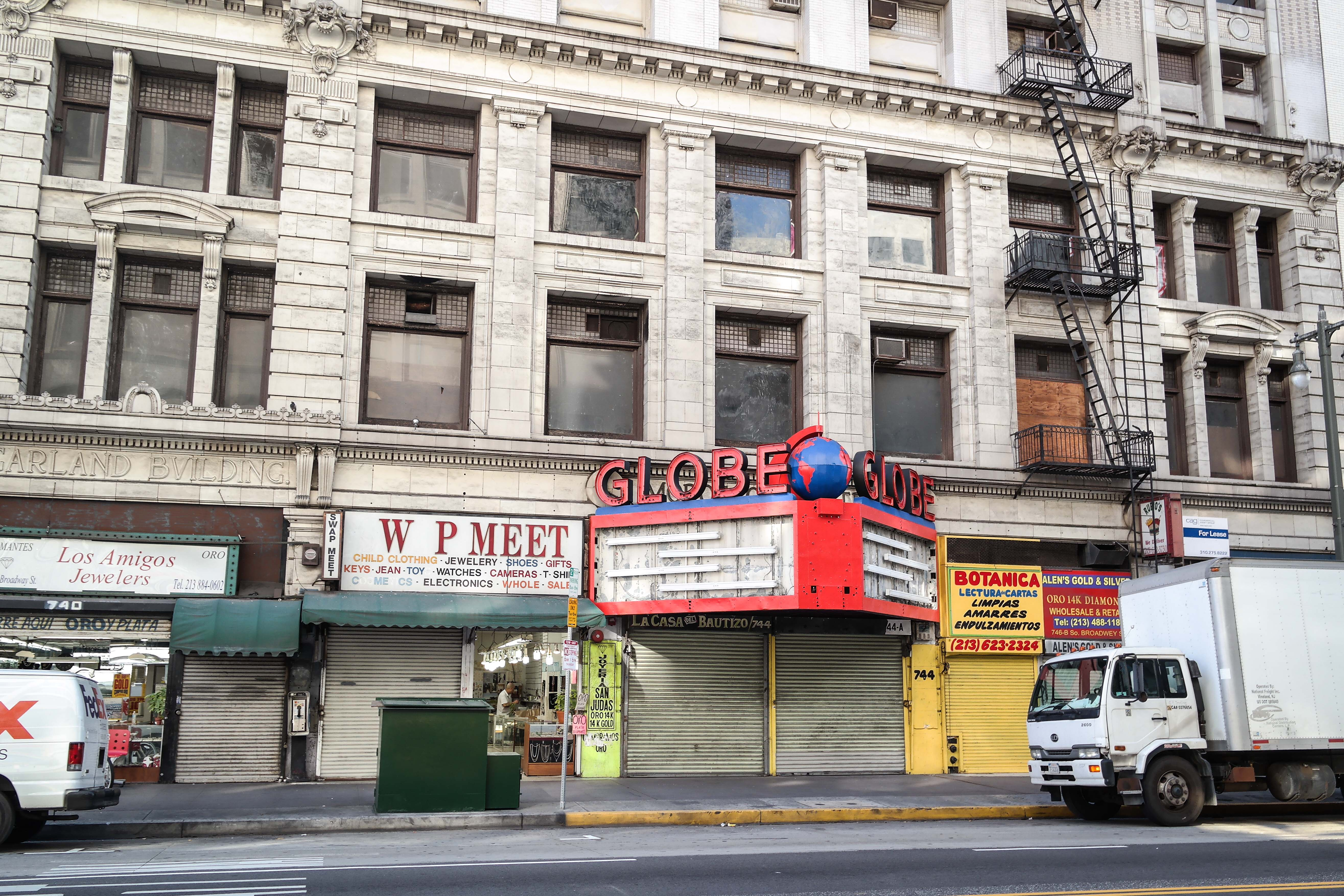
- The building in 2014

- Location within the Los Angeles metropolitan area
- Location: 740 S. Broadway, Los Angeles
- Coordinates: 34.044°N 118.254°W
- Built: 1913
- Architect: Morgan, Walls & Morgan
- Architectural style: Beaux-Arts
- Part of: Broadway Theater and Commercial District (ID79000484)
- Designated CP: May 9, 1979

Globe Theatre, originally Morosco Theatre, and Garland Building, is a theater and office building at 744 S. Broadway in the Broadway Theater District of the Historic Core of Downtown Los Angeles. It opened in 1913, has 11 stories, and was designed in Beaux-Arts architectural style by the firm of Morgan, Walls & Morgan. Alfred F. Rosenheim designed its interiors.

The Globe opened in 1913 as the Morosco Theatre with a seating capacity of 782, used for full-scale live dramatic theater, and built for impresario Oliver Morosco. The Garland Building was office space, forming a single building with the theater

The Globe was converted into a movie theater during the Great Depression, and later on showed Spanish-language films until the 1980s It was converted into a swap meet in 1987.

As of June 2014, the space was being remodeled as an entertainment venue The restored marquee was relit June 24, 2014. and served during the late 2010s and early 2020s as a multipurpose space for music, theatrical events and films, also as a nightclub where D.J.s like Questlove performed, with a capacity of 1750.

The Globe was again temporarily closed as of 2023.

As of 2025, the venue is operating with a capacity of 2,000.

== See also ==
- List of contributing properties in the Broadway Theater and Commercial District
