= Flamita =

Mexican professional wrestler

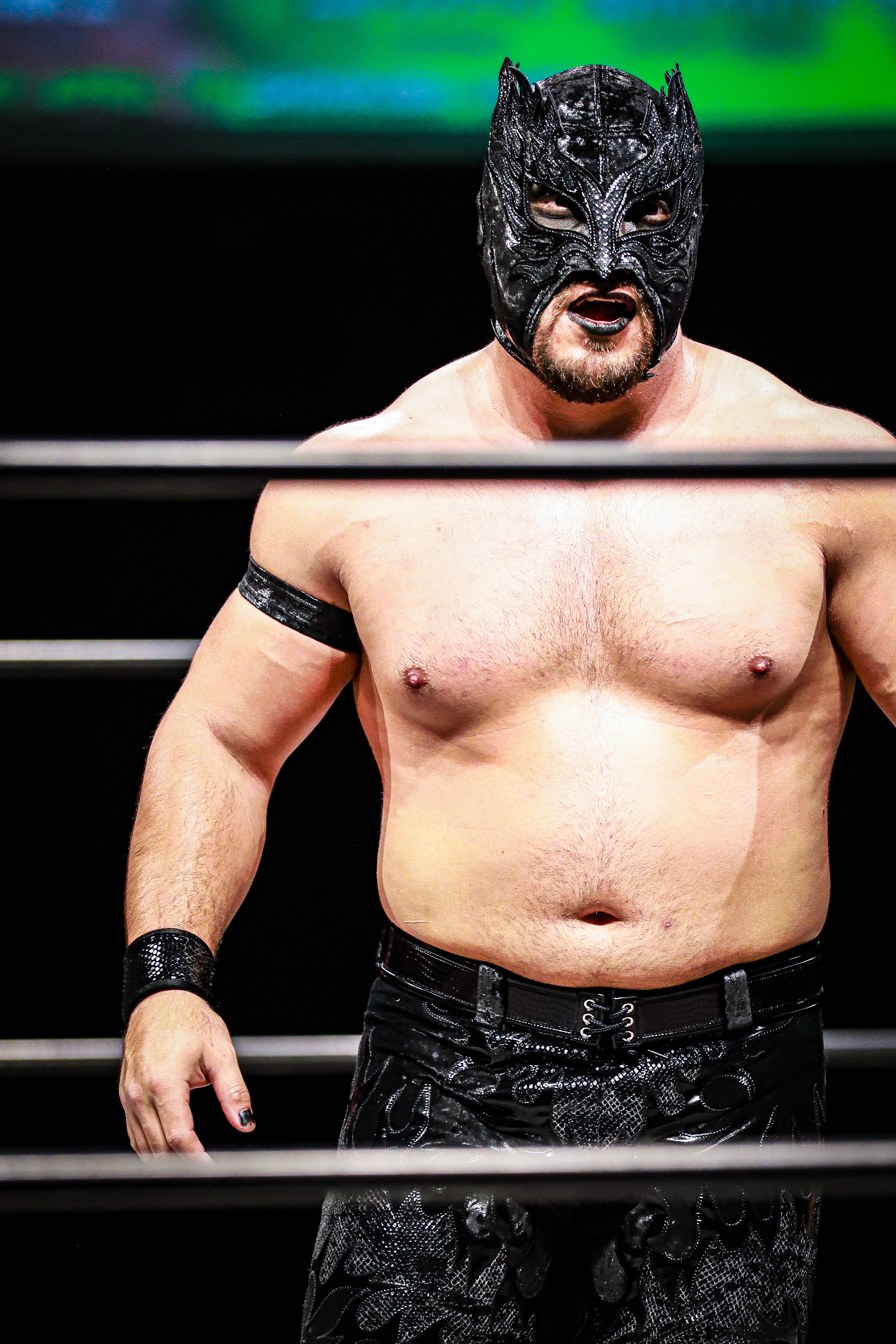
- Flamita as Demonic Flamita in April 2023

Personal information
- Born: November 30, 1994 (age 31) Mexico City, Mexico
- Family: Toro Negro (grandfather); El Retador (father); Flama Roja (uncle)

Professional wrestling career
- Ring name(s): Fireball; Demonic Flamita; Flamita; Night Claw; Octagón Jr.
- Billed height: 1.70 m (5 ft 7 in)
- Billed weight: 73 kg (161 lb)
- Trained by: Arkangel de la Muerte
- Debut: December 12, 2009

Flamita (born November 30, 1994) is a Mexican professional wrestler. currently working for International Wrestling Revolution Group (IWRG). He is also performs on the Japanese promotions Dragon Gate and Gleat. Flamita is also known for his work in Ring of Honor (ROH), Lucha Libre AAA Worldwide (AAA), Lucha Underground and Pro Wrestling Guerrilla (PWG).

Flamita is a third-generation professional wrestler. His real name is not a matter of public record as is often the case with masked wrestlers in Mexico. Dave Meltzer has called Flamita "one of the best [high-flying wrestlers] in the world", comparing him to Rey Mysterio.

== Professional wrestling career ==
=== Early career (2009–2012) ===
Both Flamita's father and grandfather were professional wrestlers; his father worked under the ring name El Retador ("The Challenger"), while his grandfather was known as Toro Negro ("Black Bull"). After five years of training, he made his professional wrestling debut on December 12, 2009, under the ring name Flamita ("Little Flame"), which he got from his uncle, who had wrestled under the name Flama Roja ("Red Flame").

Flamita started his career wrestling on the Mexican independent circuit, becoming best known for his work in the Desastre Total Ultraviolento (DTU) promotion, where he captured the Alto Rendimiento Championship on two occasions. In addition, he also worked for Alianza Universal de Lucha Libre (AULL), where he won the AULL Lightweight Championship in April 2012, only to vacate it two months later.

=== Lucha Libre AAA Worldwide (2011–2016) ===
On June 26, 2011, Flamita made his debut for one of Mexico's top promotions, Lucha Libre AAA Worldwide (AAA), at a benefit show co-produced by AAA and DTU. Throughout 2013, Flamita worked several AAA shows, mainly wrestling either dark or opening matches. He was also part of the short-lived roster split, being recruited as part of the AAA Fusion roster. AAA reportedly wanted Flamita to take over the role of Octagón Jr., but he turned down the offer in order to continue working in Japan.

Following his success in Japan and months of rumors that AAA were interested in signing him full-time, Flamita returned to the promotion on July 10, 2015, now working under the new ring name Fireball and teaming with Ludxor in a tag team match, where they defeated Daga and Steve Pain. Following the appearance, Flamita announced he had not signed a contract with AAA and was still undergoing negotiations with the promotion. Flamita started working for AAA as a regular in November 2015.

On March 4, 2016, Flamita was repackaged as the second Octagón Jr. He was quickly branded a "fraud" by Octagón, the luchador the character was based on, who stated that he had not given AAA the permission to introduce another Octagón Jr. On April 10, Octagón Jr. was confronted and unmasked by Octagón during an autograph signing. Three days later, Octagón introduced his own Octagón Jr. or "Hijo de Octagón", supposedly portrayed by his son. On April 27, Flamita stated that out of respect toward Octagón, he was dropping the Octagón Jr. gimmick, leaving AAA and returning to the independent circuit under the Flamita name. Following his departure from AAA, Flamita made his Arena México debut on June 9, 2016, working an event held by Lucha Libre Elite.

=== Dragon Gate (2013–2019) ===
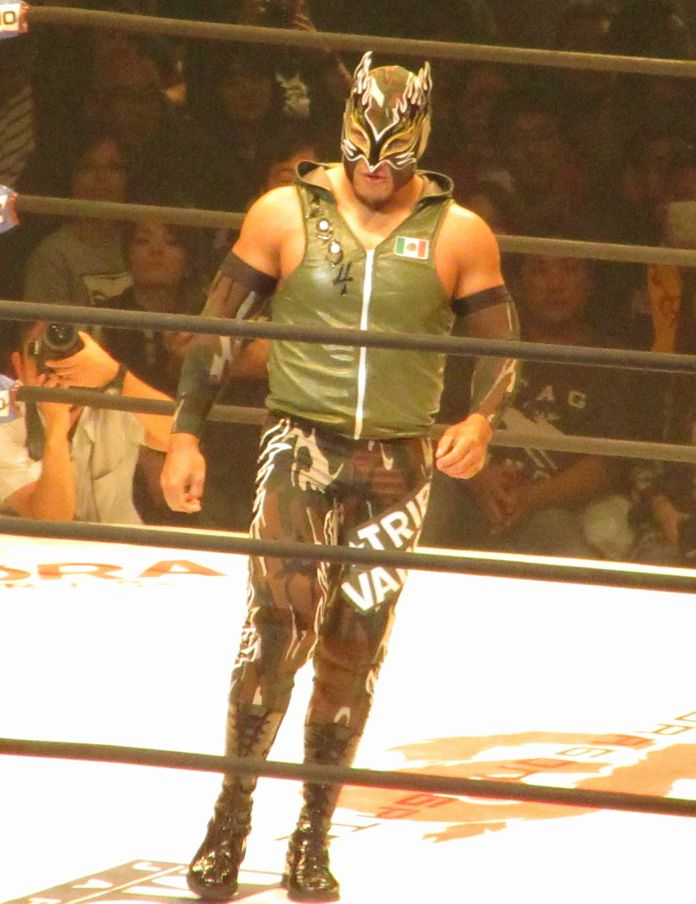
Flamita in November 2016

In October 2013, it was announced that Flamita, along with fellow Mexican Rocky Lobo, had been signed by the Japanese Dragon Gate promotion. He made his debut for the promotion on October 26, 2013, as part of the Millennials stable. On December 5, Flamita and his stablemates Eita and T-Hawk first won a one-night tournament to become the number one contenders to the Open the Triangle Gate Championship and then defeated Mad Blankey (BxB Hulk, Cyber Kong and Yamato) that same night to become the new champions. They lost the title to Jimmyz (Jimmy Susumu, Mr. Kyu Kyu Naoki Tanizaki Toyonaka Dolphin and Ryo "Jimmy" Saito) on December 22. On March 16, 2014, Flamita won his first singles title in Dragon Gate, when he defeated Genki Horiguchi H.A.Gee.Mee!! for the Open the Brave Gate Championship. He held the title for the rest of the year, successfully defending it against the likes of Naoki Tanizaki, Kzy, and Dragon Kid at the promotion's biggest show of the year, Kobe Pro Wrestling Festival on July 20. One of his title defenses also took place back in Mexico at a DTU event. On December 28, Flamita's ninth title defense ended in a disqualification, after he was unmasked by his challenger Punch Tominaga. Following the win, Flamita refused to accept the title belt, leaving it behind him in the ring. Three days later, Dragon Gate's office declared Flamita's reign over and title vacant.

Flamita returned to Dragon Gate three months later and on March 24, 2015, received a rematch for the Open the Brave Gate Championship, but was defeated by the defending champion, Akira Tozawa. On August 6, Millennials were forced to disband, when Flamita, Eita and T-Hawk were defeated in a three-way trios match. On October 4, Flamita joined the Dia.Hearts stable. During Flamita's hiatus from Dragon Gate, Dia.Hearts was disbanded. On July 2, 2016, Flamita returned to Dragon Gate, joining the Tribe Vanguard stable. On July 24, at the Kobe Pro Wrestling Festival, he was involved in a three-way elimination match for the Open the Triangle Gate Championship, but Tribe Vanguard were the first stable to be eliminated when Over Generation's Peter Kaasa pinned Kzy. Flamita would spend the majority of the September and October tours in tag and trios matches, and on November 3 at the Gate of Destiny, he rounded out the year with a defeat to Open The Brave Gate Champion Eita. The following year saw him continue in much the same vein, and on July 23 at the Kobe Pro Wrestling Festival, he was defeated by Open The Brave Gate Champion Jimmy Kagetora. Flamita returned to Dragon Gate in January 2018, and aside from tagging with his Tribe Vanguard stablemates, he also began wrestling with Bandido which he would do on-and-off throughout the year. On March 3, at Champion Gate in Osaka, he had another shot at the Open The Triangle Gate Championship, but he, Yamato and Yosuke♥Santa Maria were defeated by MaxiMuM (Jason Lee, Masato Yoshino and Naruki Doi). On 23 December, at Final Gate, he and Bandido were involved in a four-way match for the vacant Open the Twin Gate Championship, but they came up short as Kagetora eliminated Bandido. Flamita's final appearances for Dragon Gate took place during the summer of 2019, and culminated at the Kobe Pro Wrestling Festival in a defeat to Open the Brave Gate Champion Susumu Yokosuka.

=== Lucha Underground (2016) ===
In early 2016, while he was still in AAA, Flamita took part in the season two tapings of Lucha Underground under the ring name "Night Claw". On the June 13, 2016 episode of Lucha Underground, he was involved in a seven-way elimination match for the Gift of the Gods Championship, which was eventually won by Sexy Star. In the match, he eliminated El Siniestro de la Muerte and Daga, before being eliminated by Killshot. Under the ring name "Fireball", Flamita appeared in two triple threat matches, where he was unsuccessful on both occasions. Since they were dark matches, these matches were not shown on television.

=== Pro Wrestling Guerrilla (2017–2019, 2021) ===
On September 1, 2017, Flamita made his debut for the Southern California-based Pro Wrestling Guerrilla (PWG), entering the 2017 Battle of Los Angeles tournament, from which he was eliminated in the first round by Ricochet. He later appeared at All Star Weekend, where he was defeated by Sammy Guevara in a three-way match that also involved Rey Horus. This would be the last time that Flamita would wrestle at American Legion Post #308 in Reseda, before PWG changed venues to the Globe Theatre in Broadway. (PWG would host three final dates in Reseda, but Flamita was not on the card for these shows.) His first time wrestling at the Globe was at Time is a Flat Circle, where he and Bandido, a burgeoning tag team at the time, were defeated by the Rascalz (Dezmond Xavier and Zachary Wentz). Flamita entered the 2018 Battle of Los Angeles tournament, eliminating Puma King in the first round, before being eliminated in the second round by Bandido. The event also saw an early incarnation of MexaSquad, but he, Bandido and Horus were defeated by Cima and the Rascalz. At Smokey and the Bandido, Puma King avenged his BOLA loss by defeating Flamita in a three-way match that also involved Horus. At Mystery Vortex VI, Flamita received his first title shot as he and Horus unsuccessfully challenged the Rascalz for the PWG World Tag Team Championship. Flamita did not participate in the 2019 Battle of Los Angeles tournament, but he did appear in the event of night one, he and Bandido were defeated by the Lucha Brothers (Penta el Zero M and Rey Fenix).

On August 2, 2021, at Mystery Vortex VII, Flamita (now going by the ring name "Demonic Flamita"), returned to the promotion, following its extended hiatus due to the COVID-19 pandemic. At the event, he defeated Arez, and after the main event between PWG World Champion Bandido and Black Taurus, he attacked Bandido and began an alliance with Taurus and Super Dragon. At Threemendous VI, Flamita and Taurus were defeated by the Kings of the Black Throne (Brody King and Malakai Black) for the recently vacated PWG World Tag Team Championship.

=== Return to AAA (2018–2019) ===
In 2018, Flamita returned to AAA, where he and Bandido were involved in a number of multi-man matches. At Triplemanía XXVI, Flamita and Bandido defeated defeat Team Impact Wrestling (Andrew Everett and DJ Z) and Team ELITE (Golden Magic and Laredo Kid) and Team AAA (Aero Star and Drago) in a four-way #1 contendership ladder match for the AAA World Tag Team Championship. This led to a three-way match at Héroes Inmortales XII which saw Los Mercenarios (El Texano Jr. and Rey Escorpión) retain the championship.

During 2019, Flamita was used in #1 contendership matches for the AAA World Cruiserweight Championship and the AAA Latin American Championship. He also unsuccessfully challenged Drago and Daga for the Latin American Championship on AAA's February and November Conquista Total Gira shows.

=== Ring of Honor (2019–2021) ===
With the partnership with Ring of Honor (ROH) and Revolution Pro Wrestling (RevPro), Flamita debuted in the United Kingdom on the Honor United Tour. He filled in for his tag partner Bandido, in a loss to Colt Cabana. During the tour, he signed a one-year contract with ROH, and shortly after, he had his first win in the promotion, defeating "Speedball" Mike Bailey. At Final Battle, he and Bandido defeated Villain Enterprises (Flip Gordon and Marty Scurll). On the January 24, 2020 episode of Ring of Honor Wrestling (taped January 11), Flamita, Bandido and Rey Horus defeated Villain Enterprises for the ROH World Six-Man Tag Team Championship. However, the trio were unable to make a title defense until February 2021, initially caused by an injury to Flamita and then after the COVID-19 pandemic forced ROH to shut down production. Their long-awaited first defense was meant to be at Final Battle against Shane Taylor Promotions (Shane Taylor, Kaun and Moses), but Flamita and Bandido tested positive for COVID-19. In storyline, the board of directors had wanted the trio to vacate their titles but Taylor was against this happening and the match was rearranged. On the February 22 episode of Ring of Honor Wrestling (taped February 19), the trio were defeated by STP, with Flamita taking the pin after a piledriver from Taylor. At the ROH 19th Anniversary Show, they lost the rematch in a lucha rules match, with Flamita once again taking the pin as he was caught by a double team move from Kaun and Moses. Flamita shoved Bandido away afterwards, and Horus attempted to make peace between the two. Flamita challenged them to a three-way match later that night, which was won by Bandido. On the April 12 episode of Ring of Honor Wrestling (taped April 10), Flamita and Bandido were defeated by The Foundation (Jay Lethal and Jonathan Gresham) in a tag team match. In the match, Bandido accidentally kicked Flamita, which led to him turning on Bandido and abandoning him, throwing the match. On the May 3 episode of Ring of Honor Wrestling (taped April 24), despite Bandido having much of the offense, Flamita took advantage of a ref bump, and low-blowed him to get the pin.

Following his rudo turn, Flamita changed his ring name to "Demonic Flamita". He participated in the Survival of the Fittest tournament, defeating Horus in the first round. On the June 28 episode of Ring of Honor Wrestling, he was eliminated first by eventual winner Bandido. He and Horus would trade wins over each other at Best in the World and on the August 21 episode of Ring of Honor Wrestling. At Death Before Dishonor XVIII, Flamita unsuccessfully challenged Bandido for the ROH World Championship in a four corner survival elimination match, also involving Brody King and EC3. At Honor for All, Bandido defeated Flamita in a non-title no disqualification match, ending their feud. Flamita's last match for ROH also ended in defeat, as he partnered four other wrestlers in a ten-man tag team match at Final Battle.

=== Second return to AAA (2021–2023) ===
In 2021, Flamita returned to AAA during a co-promoted event with The Crash. During 2022, he unsuccessfully challenged El Hijo del Vikingo for the AAA Mega Championship and Laredo Kid for the AAA World Cruiserweight Championship. Having not wrestled for the promotion in two and a half months, he announced his departure in August 2023.

=== Gleat (2022–present) ===
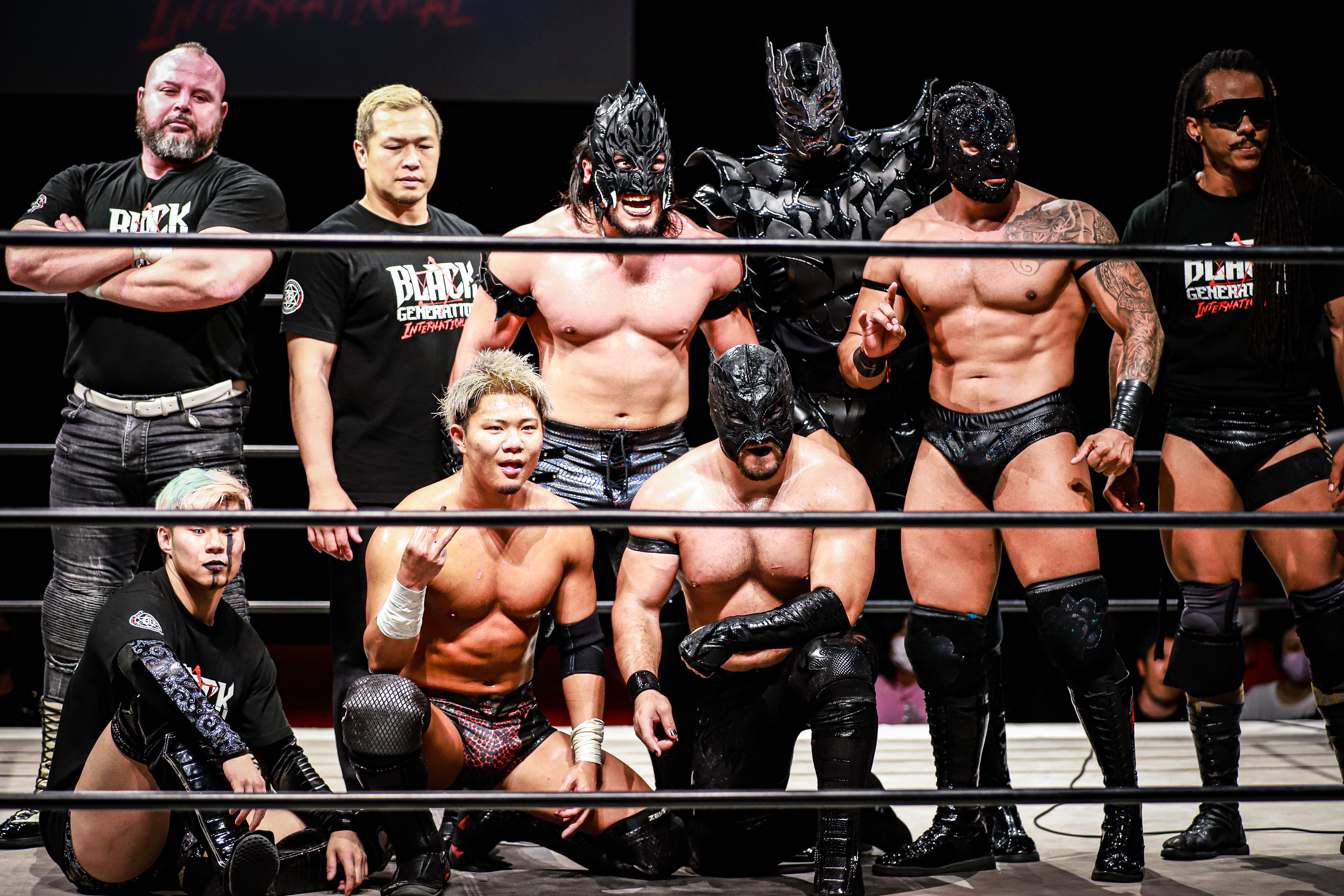
Flamita (center) in April 2023 with his Black Generation International stablemates at a Shin-Kiba 1st Ring show

In August 2022, Flamita began working for Japanese promotion Gleat. On August 20, he made his debut in an eight-man match, pinning Soma Watanabe to get the win. In October, it was announced that Flamita would be returning for the November and December shows, and that he was now a member of the Black Generation stable. He began regularly teaming with Yutani, a Japanese wrestler who has primarily worked on the Mexican independent circuit. On December 30, Flamita and Yutani unsuccessfully challenged Bulk Orchestra's Check Shimatani and Hayato Tamura for the G-Infinity Championship, in a three-way match that also involved Strong Hearts. On April 12, 2023, Flamita returned to the promotion and teamed with El Bendito to once again unsuccessfully challenge Shimatani and Tamura for the G-Infinity Championship.

== Championships and accomplishments ==
- Alianza Universal de Lucha Libre
  - AULL Lightweight Championship (1 time)
- The Crash
  - The Crash Cruiserweight Championship (1 time)
  - The Crash Tag Team Championship (1 time) – with Bandido
- Desastre Total Ultraviolento
  - DTU Alto Rendimiento Championship (2 times)
- Dragon Gate
  - Open the Brave Gate Championship (1 time)
  - Open the Triangle Gate Championship (3 times, current) – with Eita and T-Hawk (1), Kzy and Strong Machine J (1), and Bendito and Luis Mante (1)
  - Open the Twin Gate Championship (1 time) - with Kzy
- International Wrestling Revolution Group
  - IWRG Intercontinental Middleweight Championship (1 time, current)
- Progress Wrestling
  - PROGRESS Tag Team Championship (1 time) – with Bandido
- Pro Wrestling Illustrated
  - Ranked No. 177 of the top 500 singles wrestlers in the PWI 500 in 2021
- Ring of Honor
  - ROH World Six-Man Tag Team Championship (1 time) – with Rey Horus and Bandido
