= Lucha Brothers =

Professional wrestling tag team

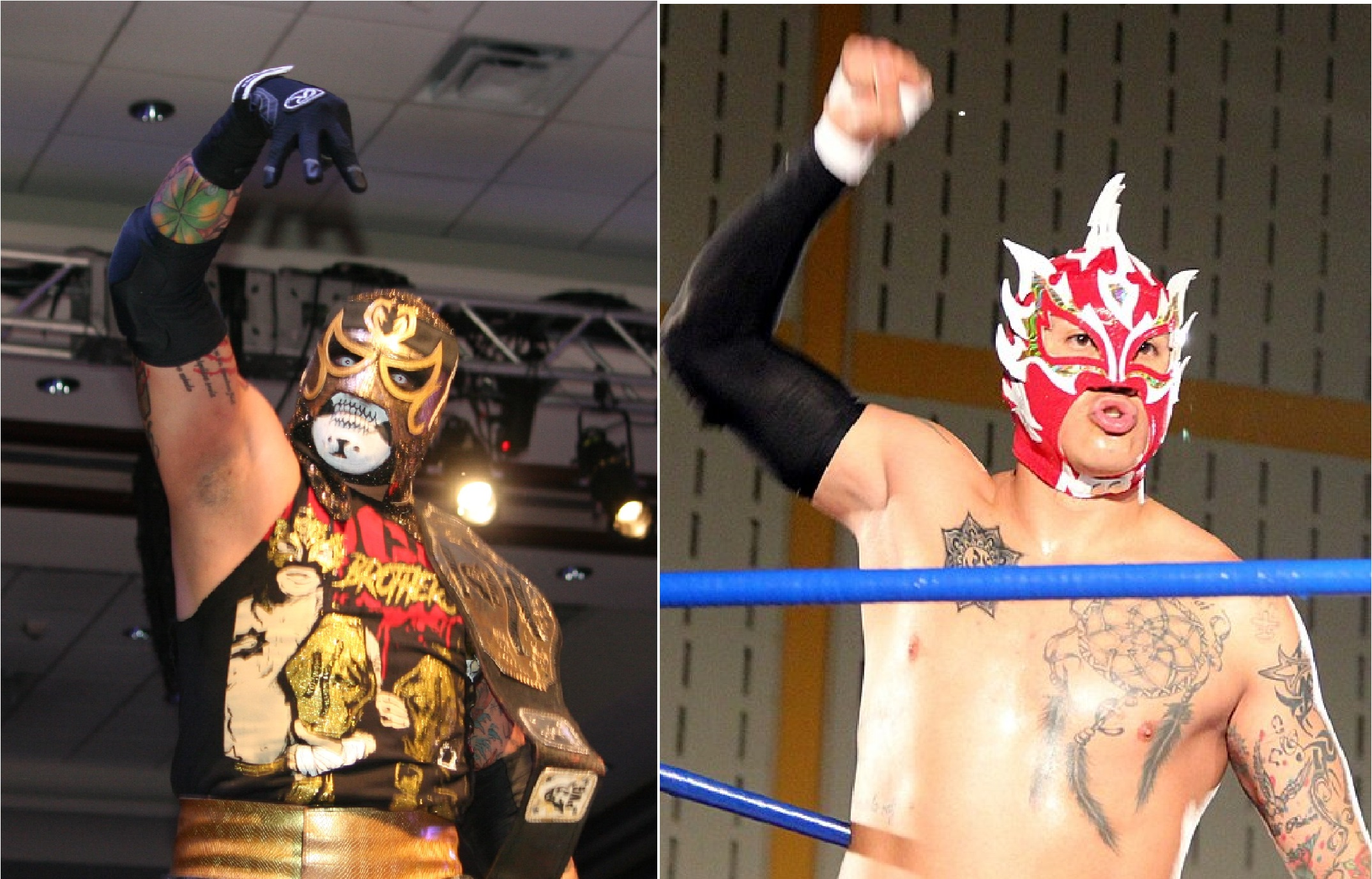
- Lucha Brothers (Penta (left) and Rey Fénix (right))

Tag team
- Name(s): The Lucha Brothers; The Lucha Bros; Los Lucha Bros
- Members: Pentagón Jr./Penta El Zero M/Penta El Zero Miedo/Penta Oscuro/Penta; Rey Fénix/Fénix/King Phoenix
- Billed heights: Pentagón: 5 ft 11 in (1.80 m); Fénix: 5 ft 10 in (1.78 m)
- Combined billed weight: 394 lb (179 kg)
- Hometown: Mexico City, Mexico
- Billed from: Mexico City, Mexico
- Debut: January 1, 2015
- Years active: 2015–2024; 2025–present

The Lucha Brothers are a Mexican professional wrestling tag team consisting of brothers Penta and Rey Fénix. They are signed to WWE, where Penta performs on the Raw brand and is the former one-time WWE Intercontinental Champion. while Fénix performs on the SmackDown brand; and they also appear in WWE's sister promotion, Lucha Libre AAA Worldwide (AAA), where Fénix is the current AAA World Cruiserweight Champion in his second reign. They are known for their time in All Elite Wrestling (AEW), where they were former AEW World Tag Team Champions, as well as former AEW World Trios Champions with their former Death Triangle stablemate, Pac. They also appeared for AEW's sister promotion, Ring of Honor (ROH), where they are former ROH World Tag Team Champions. In Mexico, they wrestled for AAA (which was then family-owned), where they are two-time AAA World Tag Team Champions. They previously appeared in Impact Wrestling (now Total Nonstop Action Wrestling), where they are former World Tag Team Champions (and Penta has been Impact World Champion), They also Wrestled for Major League Wrestling where they held the MLW World Tag Team Championship and for Pro Wrestling Guerrilla where they won the PWG World Tag Team Championship, making them the only team to be AEW, Impact, ROH, MLW, PWG and AAA World Tag Team Champions.

Their real names are unknown, as is often the case with masked wrestlers in Mexico, where their private lives are kept a secret.

== Personal lives ==
Pentagón Jr. and Fénix are real-life brothers. Pentagón Jr. now resides in Tijuana, Baja California, while Fénix resides in San Diego, California.

== Professional wrestling career ==
Not much is known about the brothers' previous history beyond what has been revealed by themselves, which is traditional in Mexican professional wrestling (Lucha libre). Both Pentagon and Fenix began training in professional wrestling on the same day, and debuted on the same day.

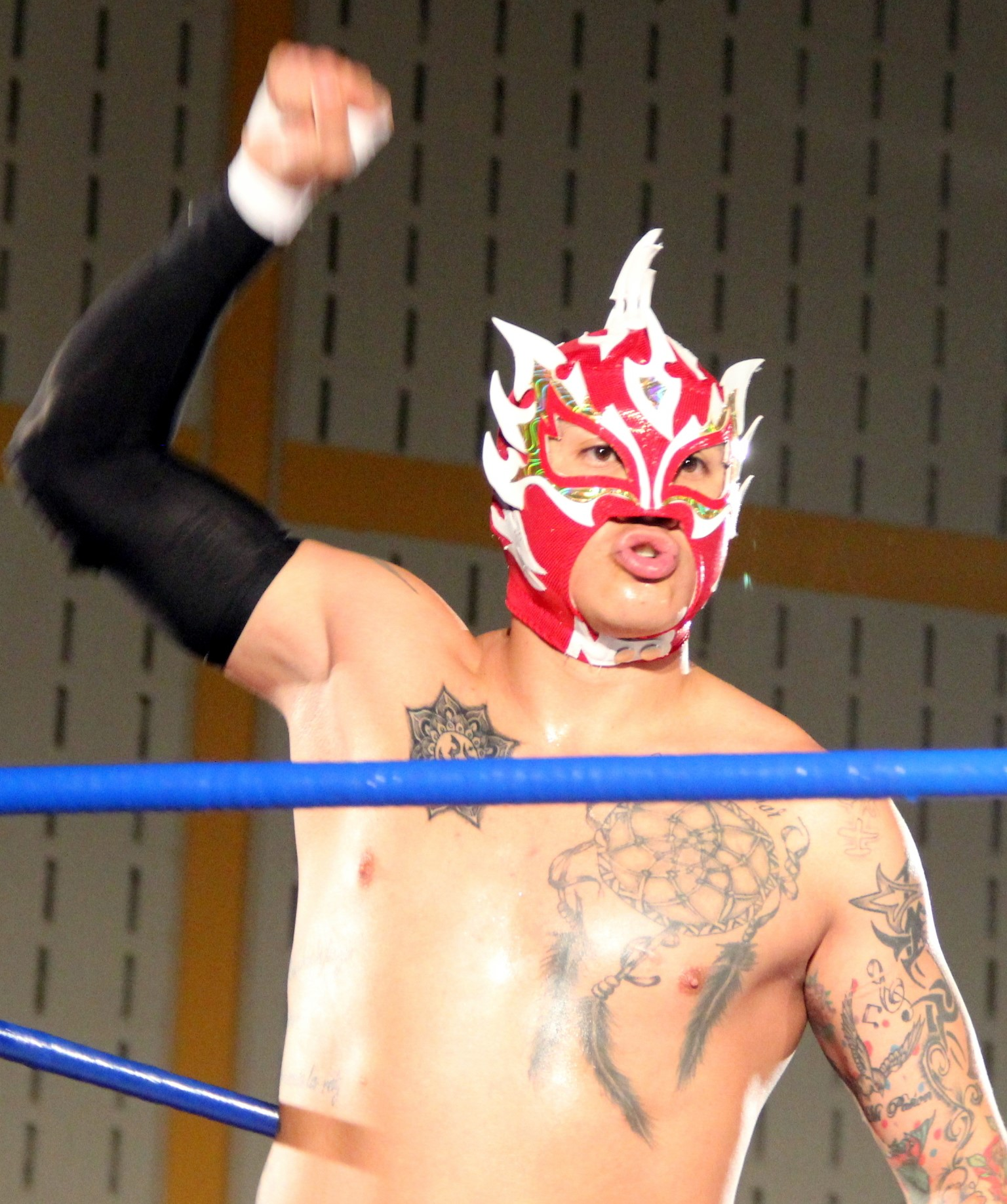
Fénix in September 2015.

=== Pro Wrestling Guerrilla (2015–2019) ===
Pentagón Jr. and Fénix both debuted in PWG during the 2015 Battle of Los Angeles. Fenix fell in the first round to Matt Sydal, while Pentagon defeated Drago to advance in the second round, where he was defeated by tournament winner Zack Sabre Jr. They would return a year later to participate in the tournament again but were once again unsuccessful with neither man advancing from the first round. They were able to defeat Chris Hero and Tommy End on the second night of the tournament which earned them a shot at The Young Bucks (Matt and Nick Jackson) for the PWG World Tag Team Championship the following night where they were unsuccessful. On March 18, 2017, Penta el 0M and Rey Fénix defeated The Young Bucks and the team of Matt Sydal and Ricochet in a three-way match to win the PWG World Tag Team Championship. On October 20, Penta and Fénix lost the championship to The Chosen Bros (Jeff Cobb and Matt Riddle), ending their reign at 216 days. On Stage Three of the 2018 Battle of Los Angeles tournament, the Lucha Brothers unsuccessfully challenged champions The Rascalz (Zachary Wentz and Dezmond Xavier) in a World Tag Team Championship match. In 2019, they entered the Battle of Los Angeles for the third time, with both men losing in the second round and making their final appearances before working for AEW.

=== AAW (2016–2019) ===
On July 23, 2016, Pentagón Jr. defeated Sami Callihan to win AAW: Professional Wrestling Redefined's Heavyweight Championship. On October 8, 2016, Pentagón Jr. put the championship on the line in a Lucha de Apuestas tag team match where his brother Fénix put his mask on the line, while their opponent risked either their hair (Callihan) or their career (Jake Crist). The match ended when Callihan pinned Pentagón Jr. to regain the championship. At AAW "Take No Prisoners" 2018, Rey Fenix and Penta El Zero M beat Myron Reed and A. R. Fox. On February 23, 2019, Fenix and Pentagon Jr. lost their titles again to LAX, in a match which also involved Myron Reed and A. R. Fox after The Young Bucks interfered in the match.

=== The Crash (2017–2019) ===
On January 27, Penta, Daga, Garza and Fénix el Rey announced the formation of a new stable named La Rebelión ("The Rebellion") in The Crash Lucha Libre. During their time in the promotion, they won the vacant Crash Tag Team Championship on November 3, 2018. However, they vacated the titles 24 days later after Fénix suffered an injury.

=== Major League Wrestling (2018–2019) ===
Pentagon made his debut for the U.S. based Major League Wrestling (MLW) on January 11, 2018, where he defeated Fénix as part of MLW's "Zero Hour" show. The following month Pentagon and Fénix (as Los Lucha Bros) defeated "Team TBD" (Jason Cade and Jimmy Yuta) and The Dirty Blondes (Leo Brien and Mike Patrick) to become the first holders of the MLW World Tag Team Championship. At "MLW Battle Riot", Fenix and Pentagon defeated Rey Horus & Drago to retain the MLW Tag Team titles. Following Pentagon's feud with LA Park, Lucha Bros begun feuding with The Hart Foundation (Teddy Hart, Davey Boy Smith Jr. and Brian Pillman Jr.) over the MLW Tag Team Championship. They would go on to lose the championships to Hart and Davey Boy Smith Jr. at SuperFight on February 2, 2019.

=== Impact Wrestling (2018–2019) ===
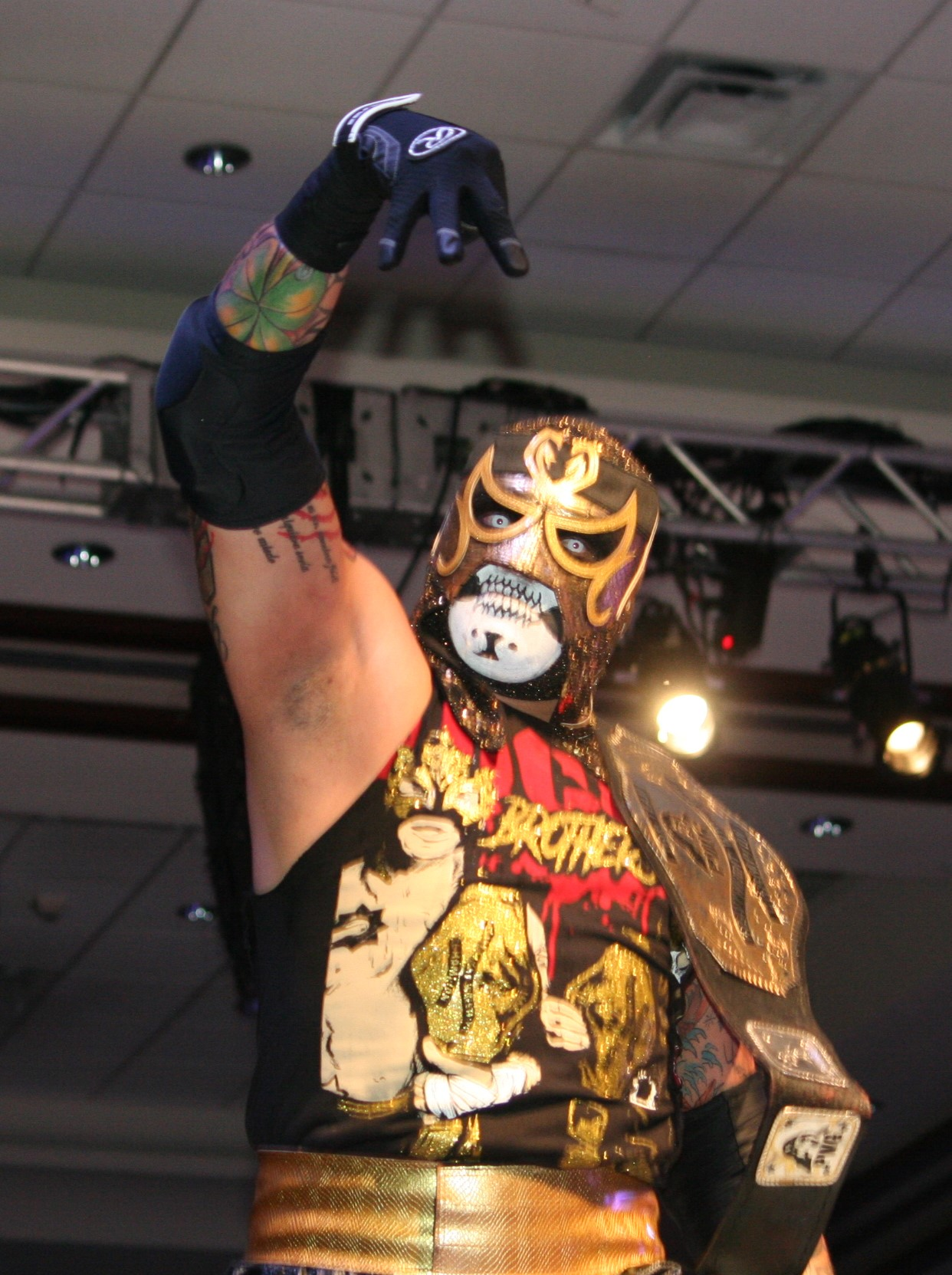
Pentagón Jr. in 2017

Pentagón and Fénix debuted with Impact Wrestling on an "Impact Wrestling vs Lucha Underground" co-promoted event at WrestleCon 2018, in a three-way match with Impact World champion Austin Aries. Following the guest appearance the Lucha Bros began working for Impact Wrestling on a regular basis. On January 12, 2019, Pentagón and Fénix defeated Santana and Ortiz of The Latin American Xchange (LAX) during the TV Tapings in Mexico City to win the Impact World Tag Team Championship and start a heated storyline with LAX. The Lucha Bros would successfully defend the tag team championship against LAX on February 2, and then against Eli Drake and Eddie Edwards on March 22. The storyline with LAX culminated at Impact Wrestling Rebellion, in a Full Metal Mayhem match where LAX won the Impact Wrestling Tag Team Championship back from the Lucha Bros. The loss was the Lucha Bros' last Impact Wrestling match for the time being.

=== All Elite Wrestling / Ring of Honor (2019–2024) ===
On February 7, 2019, at the All Elite Wrestling Ticket Announcement held at the MGM Grand Pool Splash in Las Vegas, Nevada, Pentagón Jr. and Fénix made their first appearance with the company. As The Young Bucks were leaving the stage, The Lucha Brothers music played seeing the two teams face off before a brawl ensued with Pentagón striking Matt Jackson first, while Fénix took out Nick Jackson with a superkick. Pentagón then proceeded to hit Matt Jackson on the stage with a Fear Factor, before announcing themselves for AEW's inaugural event, Double Or Nothing. Later on February 23, The Young Bucks made a surprise appearance in AAW Wrestling, attacking Lucha Brothers during their AAW Tag Team Championship defense, costing them to lose the match. The Young Bucks then challenged the brothers to a match at Double or Nothing, which was accepted. At AAA's Rey de Reyes, The Young Bucks defeated The Lucha Brothers for the AAA World Tag Team Championship. This subsequently turned their Double or Nothing match into a rematch for the championship, which The Young Bucks won.

On the October 30, 2019 episode of AEW Dynamite, SoCal Uncensored (Frankie Kazarian and Scorpio Sky) defeated the Lucha Brothers to become the inaugural AEW World Tag Team Champions. Their feud would continue at Full Gear while slowly transitioning into heels, where they competed for the titles in a three-way match also involving Private Party, which SoCal Uncensored won. On the February 5, 2020 episode of Dynamite, Lucha Brothers pinned the AEW Tag Team Champions Kenny Omega and Adam Page in an eight-man tag team match, earning them a title shot which they lost on February 19.

On March 4, they formed a trio along with Pac known as Death Triangle, confirming their heel turn in the process. They made their debut as a team against Joey Janela and the Private Party, defeating them. However, with Pac stuck in the UK, due to travel restrictions, they then formed an alliance with Eddie Kingston as well as The Butcher and The Blade. On November 18, the Death Triangle returned to AEW Dynamite after an eight-month absence, where Pac won his return match against The Blade and was then saved by Fenix and Penta after being attacked by Kingston and Butcher and Blade after the match and also turning the trio into babyfaces at the same time. At All Out on September 5, they defeated the Young Bucks in a Steel Cage match to win the AEW World Tag Team Championship. On the October 16 episode of Dynamite, they defended the AAA World Tag Team Championship against the team of Las Super Ranas, who turned out to be FTR in disguise. FTR defeated the Lucha Bros. for the titles, ending their record-breaking reign at 853 days. On the January 5, 2022 episode of Dynamite, the Jurassic Express defeated them to win their first AEW World Tag Team Championship, during which Fenix dislocated his arm when being driven through a table.

Following The Elite being stripped of the AEW World Trios Championship following a legitimate fight that broke out after the All Out media scrum, Death Triangle defeated the Best Friends to win the vacant titles on the September 7, 2022 episode of Dynamite. They defended the titles several times, including against The Elite at Full Gear. The Full Gear match would kick off a Best of 7 Series, which would see The Elite win the series 4–3, ending Death Triangle's reign at 126 days. In 2023, the Lucha Brothers would begin appearing for AEW's sister promotion, Ring of Honor (ROH). At Supercard of Honor on March 31, 2023, the Lucha Brothers would defeat Top Flight (Dante and Darius Martin), The Kingdom (Matt Taven and Mike Bennett), Aussie Open (Kyle Fletcher and Mike Davis), and La Facción Ingobernable (Rush and Dralístico) in a "Reach for the Sky" ladder match to win the vacant ROH World Tag Team Championship. On July 21 at Death Before Dishonor, the Lucha Brothers lost the titles to Aussie Open in a four-way tag team match. At Double Or Nothing on May 26, 2024 The Lucha Brothers along with Pac, reforming Death Triangle, challenged Bang Bang Gang for both the AEW World Trios Championship and ROH Six-Man Tag Team Championship in a losing effort following interference from a returning Juice Robinson. On the July 19 (taped July 17) episode of Rampage they defeated Private Party in what would end up being Pentagon's final appearance in AEW. Fenix would make one additional appearance, without Pentagon, defeating Tony Nese on the July 20th episode of Collision in what would be his final appearance in the AEW. He was taken off television shortly afterwards. On November 30, Pentagon's contract expired, with Fénix being released four months later.

=== WWE / Return to AAA (2025–present) ===
On January 6, 2025 at the Raw premiere on Netflix, a video aired teasing Pentagón's debut in WWE. He made his official WWE debut on the following week's episode of Raw under the ring name Penta, defeating Chad Gable. On March 21, it was reported by Fightful Select Español that Fénix was officially signed to WWE. In the same month, WWE began airing vignettes on SmackDown to promote his debut. He made his debut on the April 4 episode of SmackDown under his Rey Fénix name, defeating Nathan Frazer.

At the November 22, 2025 Alianzas event, the Lucha Brothers had made their return to AAA (which was then acquired by WWE earlier in April); who then reunited and challenged the Los Gringos Locos 2.0 (Dominik Mysterio and El Grande Americano) in a tag team match on December 20 at Guerra de Titanes, but Penta was forced to withdraw from the match due to an injury. On the March 2 episode of Raw, Penta defeated Dominik Mysterio to win the Intercontinental Championship, marking his first championship in WWE. At Noche de Los Grandes, Fénix defeated Laredo Kid to win the AAA World Cruiserweight Championship for the second time. The Lucha Brothers officially tagged together for the first time at Worlds Collide (2026) were they defeated Los Perros del Mal (Daga and Berto) via disqualification. At Survivor Series (2026), they are schdeled to team together as part of "Team Mexico" led by Rey Mysterio in a tradtional Survivor Series match.

== Championships and accomplishments ==
- AAW: Professional Wrestling Redefined
  - AAW Tag Team Championship (1 time)
- All Elite Wrestling
  - AEW International Championship (1 time) – Rey Fénix
  - AEW World Tag Team Championship (1 time)
  - AEW World Trios Championship (1 time) – with Pac
  - AEW World Tag Team Championship Eliminator Tournament (2021)
  - Dynamite Award (1 time)
    - Best Tag Team Brawl (2022) – Young Bucks vs Lucha Brothers, Steel Cage Match
- CBS Sports
  - Tag Team of the Year (2019)
- The Crash Lucha Libre
  - The Crash Tag Team Championship (1 time)
- House of Glory
  - HOG Tag Team Championship (1 time)
- Impact Wrestling
  - Impact World Tag Team Championship (1 time)
- Lucha Libre AAA Worldwide
  - AAA World Tag Team Championship (2 times)
  - AAA World Cruiserweight Championship (2 times, current) – Rey Fénix
- Major League Wrestling
  - MLW World Tag Team Championship (1 time)
- Pro Wrestling Guerrilla
  - PWG World Tag Team Championship (1 time)
- Pro Wrestling Illustrated
  - Ranked No. 2 of the top 50 Tag Teams in the PWI Tag Team 50 in 2021
- Ring of Honor
  - ROH World Tag Team Championship (1 time)
- Wrestling Alliance Revolution
  - WAR World Tag Team Championship (1 time)
- Xtreme Mexican Wrestling
  - XMW Tag Team Championship (1 time)
- Wrestling Observer Newsletter
  - Tag Team of The Year (2019)
  - Mexico MVP (2019, 2020) – Rey Fénix
  - Best Flying Wrestler (2020, 2021) – Rey Fénix
  - Pro Wrestling Match of the Year (2021) vs. The Young Bucks at All Out
- WWE
  - WWE Intercontinental Championship (1 time) – Penta
  - Men's Money in the Bank (2026) – Penta
