= Road to G1 Supercard =

2019 Ring of Honor professional wrestling event

- Promotion: Ring of Honor
- Date: January 24–26, March 31, 2019
- City: Night 1: Dallas, Texas; Night 2: Houston, Texas; Night 3: San Antonio, Texas; Night 4: Baltimore, Maryland
- Venue: Night 1: Gilley's Dallas; Night 2: NRG Arena; Night 3: Austin Highway Event Center; Night 4: UMBC Event Center

Ring of Honor pay-per-view chronology
← Previous; Honor Reigns Supreme	Next → ROH: Bound By Honor; ROH + NJPW: G1 Supercard

Road to G1 Supercard was a professional wrestling livestreaming event and tour produced by Ring of Honor (ROH). The show took place on January 24, 2019 at Gilley's Dallas in Dallas, Texas, January 25, 2019 at the NRG Arena in Houston, Texas, January 26, 2026 at the Austin Highway Event Center in San Antonio, Texas, and March 31, 2019 at the UMBC Event Center in Baltimore, Maryland. All four nights were streamed live on Honor Club.

== Production ==
=== Background ===
In June 2018, it was officially announced that Ring of Honor and New Japan Pro-Wrestling would be running a show at Madison Square Garden. One month later, it was reported that the event would have been canceled due to interference by WWE. The issues were eventually resolved and tickets went on sale for the event in August. During the pre-sale, 60% of tickets were sold, with the remaining of the 15,000 tickets selling within 16 minutes of going on sale. The G1 Supercard was the first professional wrestling event at Madison Square Garden by a promotion not owned by the McMahon family since November 14, 1960.

On March 26, 2019, Ring of Honor announced that Flip Gordon would not be competing on the March 31, 2019 show in Baltimore due to a knee injury.

=== Storylines ===
Road to G1 Supercard featured multiple professional wrestling matches that involved different wrestlers from pre-existing scripted feuds and storylines. Storylines were produced on ROH's weekly television Ring of Honor Wrestling and various ROH pay-per-view and livestreaming events.

== Results ==
Night 1 - January 24, 2019
No.	Results	Stipulations	Times
1^{D}	Rayo and Vinny Pacifico defeated Andy Dalton and Elijah King	Tag team match	—
2	Marty Scurll defeated Rhett Titus	Singles match	9:26
3	Lifeblood (David Finlay and Juice Robinson) defeated Alex Coughlin and Karl Fredericks	Tag Wars 2019 first round match	8:37
4	Jeff Cobb (c) defeated Clark Connors	ROH World Television Championship Proving Ground match	4:08
5	Dalton Castle and The Boys (Boy 1 and Boy 2) defeated Shane Taylor and The Briscoes (Jay Briscoe and Mark Briscoe) by disqualification	Six man tag team match	9:17
6	Madison Rayne defeated Holidead (with Thunder Rosa)	Singles match	8:02
7	Matt Taven defeated Rocky Romero	Singles match	15:55
8	Villain Enterprises (Brody King and PCO) defeated The Kingdom (TK O'Ryan and Vinny Marseglia)	Tag team match	14:55
9	Bandido defeated Silas Young	Singles match	20:06
10	Jay Lethal and Jonathan Gresham defeated Lifeblood (Mark Haskins and Tracy Williams)	Tag Wars 2019 first round match	23:32
(c) / – the champion(s) heading into the match; D / – this was a dark match

Night 2 - January 25, 2019
No.	Results	Stipulations	Times
1^{D}	Brian Johnson defeated Ryan Nova	Singles match	—
2	The Bouncers (Brian Milonas and The Beer City Bruiser) defeated The Boys (Boy 1 and Boy 2)	Tag Wars 2019 first round match	7:06
3	Lifeblood (David Finlay and Juice Robinson) defeated Alex Coughlin and Karl Fredericks	Tag Wars 2019 first round match	1:36
4	Villain Enterprises (Brody King, Marty Scurll, and PCO) defeated Alex Coughlin, Clark Connors, and Karl Fredericks	Six man tag team match	8:28
5	Coast 2 Coast (LSG and Shaheem Ali) defeated Shinobi Shadow Squad (Cheeseburger and Eli Isom)	Tag Wars 2019 first round match	10:38
6	Jay Lethal (c) defeated Vinny Marseglia	Singles match for the ROH World Championship	9:02
7	TK O'Ryan (with Vinny Marseglia) defeated Jonathan Gresham	Singles match	9:40
8	Kelly Klein (c) defeated Britt Baker	Singles match for the ROH Women of Honor World Championship	4:44
9	Kenny King and MVP defeated Colt Cabana and Willie Mack	Tag Wars 2019 first round match	15:37
10	Rocky Romero defeated Dalton Castle (with Boy 1 and Boy 2) and Jeff Cobb (c)	ROH World Television Championship three way Proving Ground match	9:20
11	Lifeblood (Bandido, David Finlay, Juice Robinson, Mark Haskins, and Tracy Williams) defeated Bully Ray, Shane Taylor, Silas Young and The Briscoes (Jay Briscoe and Mark Briscoe)	Ten man tag team match	25:58
(c) / – the champion(s) heading into the match; D / – this was a dark match

Night 3 - January 26, 2019
No.	Results	Stipulations
1^{D}	Andy Dalton defeated Elijah King	Singles match
2^{D}	Rayo and Vinny Pacifico defeated Brian Johnson and Flex Simmons	Tag team match
3	Shinobi Shadow Squad (Cheeseburger, Eli Isom, and Ryan Nova) defeated Alex Coughlin, Clark Connors & Karl Fredericks	Six man tag team match
4	The Kingdom (Matt Taven, TK O'Ryan, and Vinny Marseglia) (c) defeated Dalton Castle and The Boys (Boy 1 and Boy 2)	Six man tag team match for the ROH World Six Man Tag Team Championship
5	Tracy Williams (with Tenille Dashwood) defeated Rhett Titus	Singles match
6	Villain Enterprises (Brody King and PCO) defeated Kenny King and MVP and The Bouncers (Brian Milonas and The Beer City Bruiser)	Tag Wars 2019 semi final three way match
7	Lifeblood (David Finlay and Juice Robinson) defeated Coast 2 Coast (LSG and Shaheem Ali) and Jay Lethal and Jonathan Gresham	Tag Wars 2019 semi final three way match
8	Kelly Klein (c) defeated Sumie Sakai by referee's decision	Singles match for the ROH Women of Honor World Championship
9	Jeff Cobb and Willie Mack defeated Shane Taylor and Silas Young by disqualification	Tag team match
10	Bandido defeated Rocky Romero	Singles match
11	Marty Scurll defeated Mark Haskins	Singles match
12	Villain Enterprises (Brody King and PCO) defeated Lifeblood (David Finlay and Juice Robinson)	Tag Wars 2019 final match
(c) / – the champion(s) heading into the match; D / – this was a dark match

Night 4 - March 31, 2019
No.	Results	Stipulations
1^{D}	Rayo and Vinny Pacifico defeated Brian Johnson and Joe Keys (with Jared Silberkleit)	Tag team match
2	Rush defeated Tracy Williams	Singles match
3	Shinobi Shadow Squad (Cheeseburger, Eli Isom, and Ryan Nova) defeated Coast 2 Coast (LSG and Shaheem Ali) and Colin Delaney	Six man tag team match
4	Mark Haskins defeated Silas Young	Singles match
5	Kris Statlander and Tasha Steelz defeated Gabby Ortiz and Karissa Rivera and Jenny Rose and Sumie Sakai	Three way tag team match
6	The Briscoes (Jay Briscoe and Mark Briscoe) defeated Villain Enterprises (Brody King and PCO) (c) by DQ	Tag team match for the ROH World Tag Team Championship
7	Kenny King defeated PJ Black	Singles match
8	Marty Scurll defeated Shane Taylor	Singles match
9	Jeff Cobb and Willie Mack defeated Shane Taylor and Silas Young by disqualification	Tag team match
10	Jay Lethal and Jeff Cobb defeated Lifeblood (Bandido and Juice Robinson) and The Kingdom (TK O'Ryan and Vinny Marseglia)	Three way tag team match
(c) / – the champion(s) heading into the match; D / – this was a dark match
