= Women of Honor =

Female talent in Ring of Honor

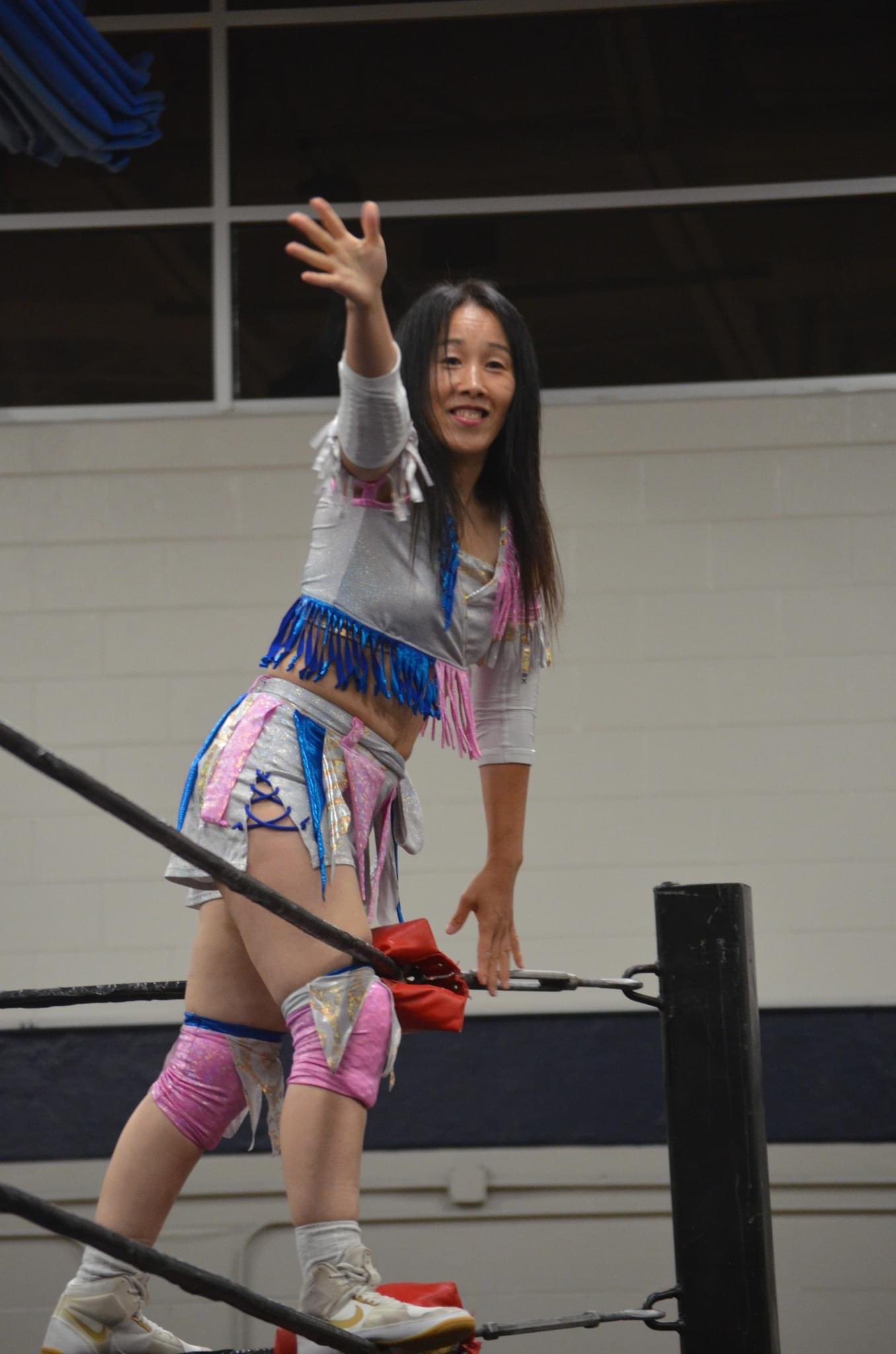
- The first Women of Honor in-ring competitor and inaugural Women of Honor Champion Sumie Sakai.
- Acronym: WOH
- Style: Women's professional wrestling
- Parent: Ring of Honor (ROH)
- Website: www.rohwrestling.com

Women of Honor is a term used by Ring of Honor (ROH) to refer to its women's division and to the promotion's female talent. The term is applied universally to wrestlers, backstage interviewers, and managers/valets.

== History of women in Ring of Honor ==
=== Early years and partnership with Shimmer (2002–2011) ===
ROH had its first women's match on June 22, 2002, at its Road to the Title show; it saw Sumie Sakai defeat Simply Luscious. Women's wrestling was sporadically featured in ROH since the match. During the 2000s, ROH featured female wrestlers like Sara Del Rey, Daizee Haze, Serena Deeb, MsChif, Amazing Kong, Ashley Lane, Nevaeh, Allison Danger, Lacey, Taeler Hendrix, Mercedes Martinez and others on shows, later releasing a DVD featuring the best of its women's division. Some of women's matches were also featured on ROH's television program on HDNet but ROH did not consistently feature women's matches until 2015.

ROH also had a partnership with women's professional wrestling promotion Shimmer Women Athletes, with the Shimmer Championship and Shimmer Tag Team Championship being defended on several ROH shows – becoming the first women's titles to be featured in ROH.

=== End of partnership with Shimmer (2011–2015) ===
From years 2011 to 2015, ROH's female talent primarily consisted of female valets and interviewers although some female workers and wrestlers would compete in matches in the promotion. During this time period women of ROH managed and accompanied male stars such as Michael Elgin, Mike Bennett, Matt Taven, Truth Martini, R.D. Evans, Moose, Cedric Alexander, Jay Lethal & Prince Nana were a part of stables such as The Kingdom, The House of Truth, Team RnB and The Briscoe Brothers that they also managed every now & then.

For example, on February 26, 2011 at ROH 9th Anniversary Show Sara Del Ray defeated MsChif with Shane Hagadorn in Sara's corner as a male valet / ally.

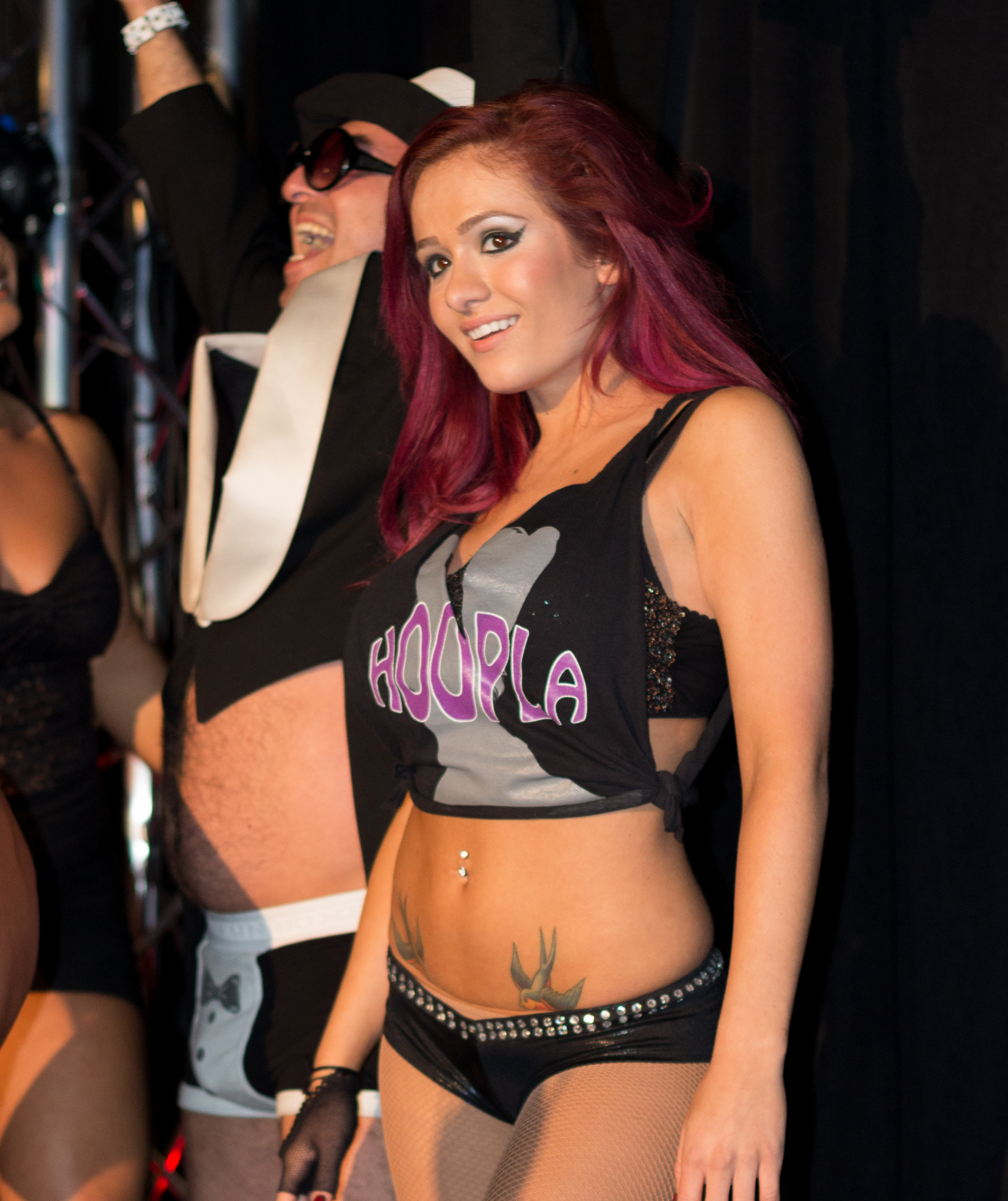
Scarlett Bordeaux accompanying Truth Martini (immediately behind) at a Ring of Honor taping in Toronto, Ontario during year 2013

During this time period there was no such thing as a Women's Championship that was properly owned by Ring of Honor such as the ROH Women's World Championship and the firstly ROH Women of Honor World Championship, during this time period ERA the women of ROH had to work with just brond & beauty with barley even a Shimmer Championship to compete for.

Also during that time period ROH Girls such as Maria Kanellis, Sara Del Ray, Allysin Kay, Jenny Rose, Athena Reese, Scarlett Bordeaux, Mandy Leon, Mia Yim, Cherry Bomb, MsChif, Barbi Hayden, Taeler Hendrix, Seleziya Sparx, Veda Scott, Leah Von Dutch, Tara, ODB, Kasey Ray, Jessie Brooks and probably more spent there time wrestling in rare once in a life time (especially seen on television) ROH Women of Honor matches, in mix-tag team matches against each other, interviewing talent, interviewing backstage talent, ring announcing, side ring bell ringing and managing and valeting male talent of the company.

For example, during year 2011 Mia Yim was introduced to Ring of Honor Wrestling by Prince Nana as Princess Mia Yim afterwards from that point on she went on to valet his male stable alliance alongside him in Ring of Honor. Around that time she also had a match against Sara Del Ray in Ring of Honor Wrestling but was not successful.

For another factual example during those years, during year 2013 Athena Reese was a part of a ROH stable by the name of Team RnB alongside another ROH wrestler by the name of A. C. H. weeks later A.C.H. ran into another ROH wrestler by the name of TaDarius Thomas and then the two made an alliance tag team stable name by the name of Adrenaline RUSH that primarily consisted of A.C.H. and TaDarius Thomas only from that point on.

Afterwards the three had a six-mix tag team match against MsChif, B. J. Whitmer, and Michael Elgin but were not successful.

For an even further factual example, on August 15, 2014, at ROH Field of Honor of 2014 Jay Lethal defeated Matt Taven for the ROH World Television Championship with Seleziya aka Seleziya Sparx and Truth Martini in Jay Lethal's corner. Seleziya was Jay Lethal's female valet alongside his then male valet Truth Martini. Shortly after that Taeler Hendrix returned to ROH and became Jay Lethal's female valet replacing Seleziya Sparx but the two ladies never at the same time valeted Jay Lethal. (They were known as The House of Truth. Scarlett Bordeaux was a part of the stable before both ladies.)

=== Rebuilding the women's division (2015–2016) ===
The popularity of women in Ring of Honor has resulted in Ring of Honor taping a pilot for a standalone Women of Honor program. Ring of Honor has also made numerous Women of Honor branded merchandise available for purchase. The pilot aired as a Women of Honor-branded television special the weekend of June 25, 2016 and its success led to a Women of Honor taping that is available on DVD.

=== Women of Honor (2015; 2016–present) ===
At its founding, ROH had a partnership with the female exclusive promotion Shimmer Women Athletes (Shimmer), with their top championship - the Shimmer Championship - being defended at ROH events, essentially serving as ROH's de facto women's title in the promotion's early years.

During years 2015 to 2016 Ring of Honor regularly aired and promoted their Women of Honor matches called Women of Honor Wednesday matches (Also known as Women Division Wednesday matches starting years 2021 to 2022) on their YouTube, Facebook, and Twitter platforms.

These Women of Honor matches where presented by Ian Riccaboni. Which we're joined by ROH female talent such as Taeler Hendrix, Mandy Leon, Veda Scott, Deonna Purrazzo, Hania the Howling Huntress, Sumie Sakai, Havok and more ROH Women of Honor to compete in these reinstated Women of Honor matches since the division had been reinstated as a permanent Women of Honor division during years 2015 and 2016.

In February 2017, ROH partnered with Japanese women's only wrestling promotion World Wonder Ring Stardom for a Women of Honor tryout camp. On December 5, 2017, at Final Battle, Riccaboni introduced and announced ROH's creation of its own women's title called the Women of Honor World Championship, which would later be named the Women of Honor World Championship, as a tournament for the championship was set to start on January 20, 2018. On April 7, 2018, at Supercard of Honor XII, Sumie Sakai defeated Kelly Klein in the tournament final to become the inaugural champion. Along with Sumie Sakai, there have been four champions overall, shared between Angelina Love, Mayu Iwatani and Kelly Klein, who held the title in a record setting three-time.

On January 1, 2020, ROH deactivated the Women of Honor World Champion, held at the time by Kelly Klein, due to the former champion deciding not to renew her contract with the promotion amidst disagreements between the two parties, leading into Klein filling a lawsuit against the company over a year later in early 2021. As such, a new championship was to be created for the division, the ROH Women's World Championship. The winner was originally planned to be crowned in a 16-woman Tournament at Quest For Gold, but that tournament, as well as the Women of Honor division as a whole, was put on hold due to the event being cancelled amidst the COVID-19 pandemic.

During the ROH 19th Anniversary Show on March 26, 2021, Maria Kanellis made her on-screen return to the promotion and announced a new tournament to crown a new ROH Women's World Champion, the first since the retirement of the Women of Honor World Championship at the beginning of 2020. The tournament will take place in summer 2021, with a number of the matches to be showcased on ROH TV. The division also seemingly dropped using the 'Women of Honor' name as a month later, 'Women's Division Wednesdays' returned on ROH's official YouTube channel starting on April 28, 2021.

As of January 1, 2020, ROH deactivated the ROH Women of Honor World Championship (due to contractual issues with reigning champion Kelly Klein), and announced the creation of a brand new championship for the division, the ROH Women's World Championship. The winner was originally planned to be crowned in a 16-woman Tournament at Quest For Gold, but had been cancelled due to the COVID-19 pandemic. After ROH resumed operations following a five-month pandemic related hiatus, a new 15-woman tournament (with one participant - Angelina Love - getting a first round bye due to Vita VonStarr being removed from the tournament via other personal issues with Maria Kanellis) was announced at Best in the World that took place beginning on July 31, 2021, and tournament final which Rok-C won to become the inaugural ROH Women's World Champion on September 12, 2021, at Death Before Dishonor XVIII.

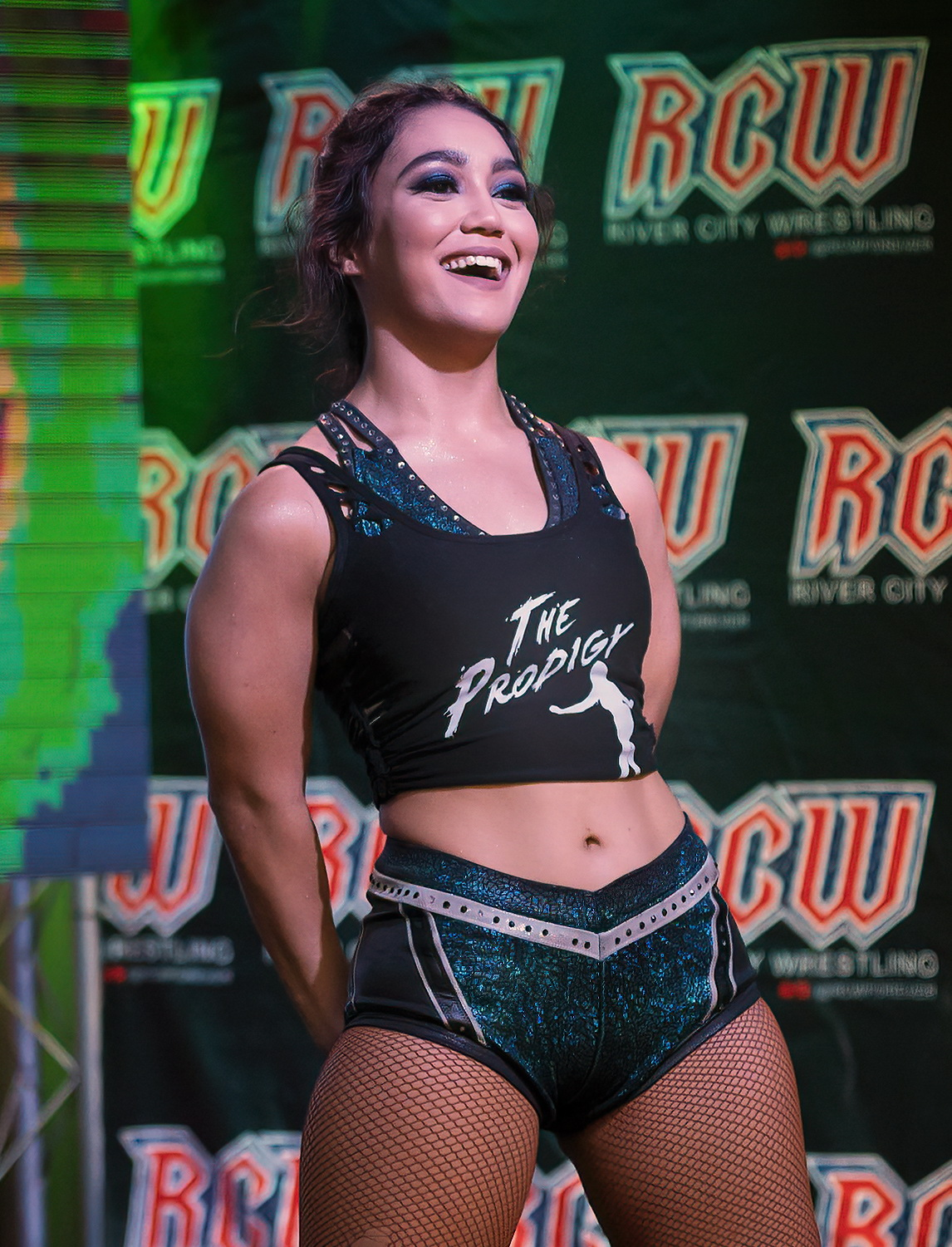
The inaugural ROH Women's World Champion Rok-C.

During early January 2022 Ring of Honor stopped having Wednesday version's of ROH women's matches and once more had ROH women's matches alongside the men and on ROH Wrestling TV shows alongside the men as they did during years 2002 to 2011 & years 2011 to 2015.

On December 16, 2023, of Ring of Honor's tapings Tony Khan unveiled a new ROH Women's title named the ROH Women's World Television Championship. On April 5, 2024, at ROH pay-per-view Supercard of Honor of year 2024 Billie Starkz defeated Queen Aminata to become the inaugural ROH Women's World Television Championship holder.

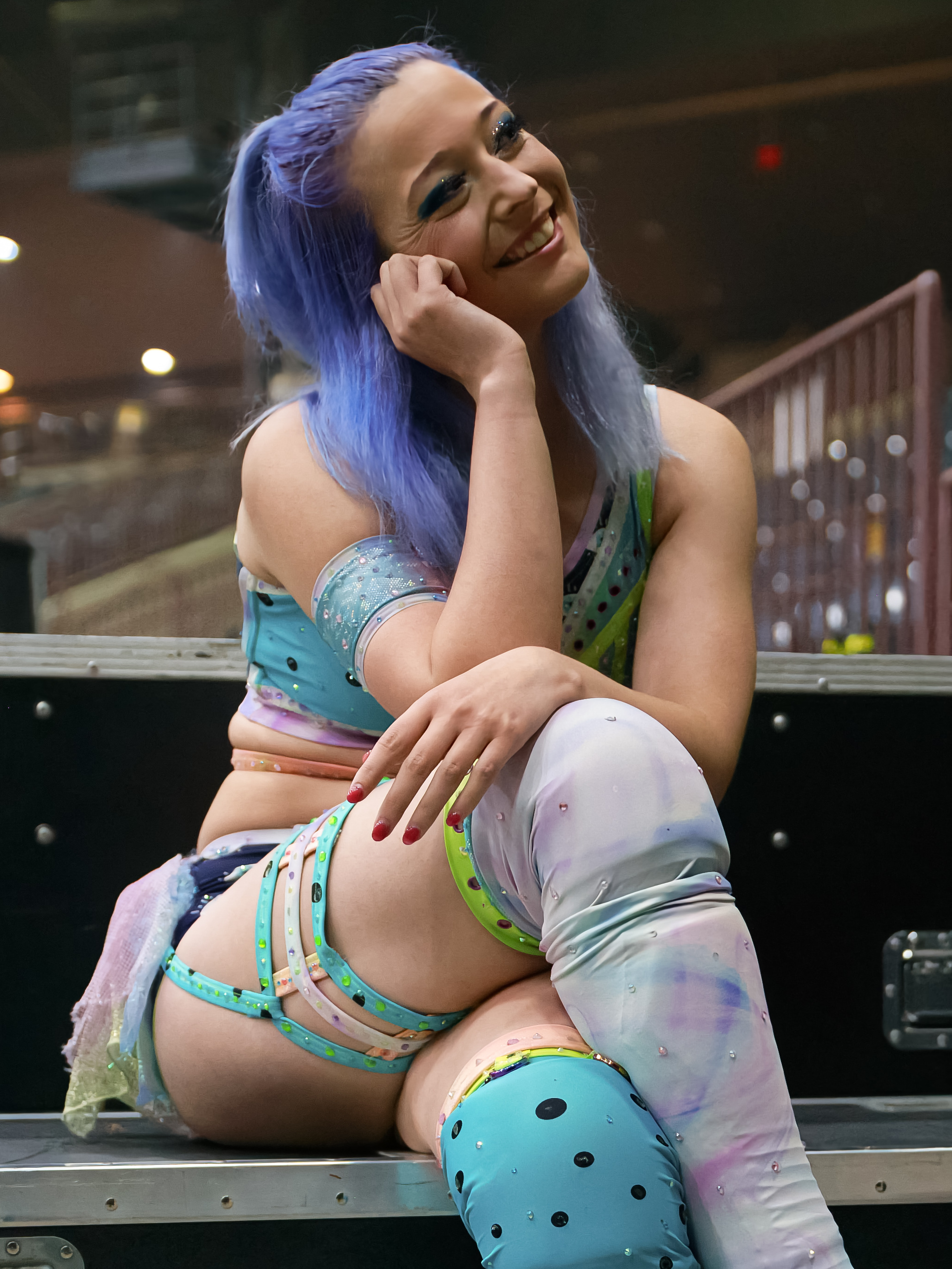
Inaugural ROH Women's World Television Champion Billie Starkz.

On September 15, 2024 Athena became the longest reigning ROH women's champion & ROH title holder of all time as a woman surpassing Samoa Joe's reign as ROH World Champion at 645 days by holding the ROH Women's World Championship for 646 days.

On February 17, 2025 Athena hit a new landmark as Ring of Honor Women's World Champion, passing the 800-day mark as champion.

After the April 12, 2025 episode of AEW Collision Tony Kahn introduced the ROH Women's Pure Championship in the ROH Women's division.

On May 29, 2025 Athena hit another milestone as ROH Women's World Champion by hitting 900 days as champion.

On September 5, 2025 Athena hit a fourth Milestone as ROH Women's World Champion by hitting 1000-days as champion.

On December 5, 2025 at Final Battle 2025 in the tournament finals ROH female veteran Deonna Purrazzo defeated Billie Starkz via submission to become the inaugural ROH Pure Women's Champion.

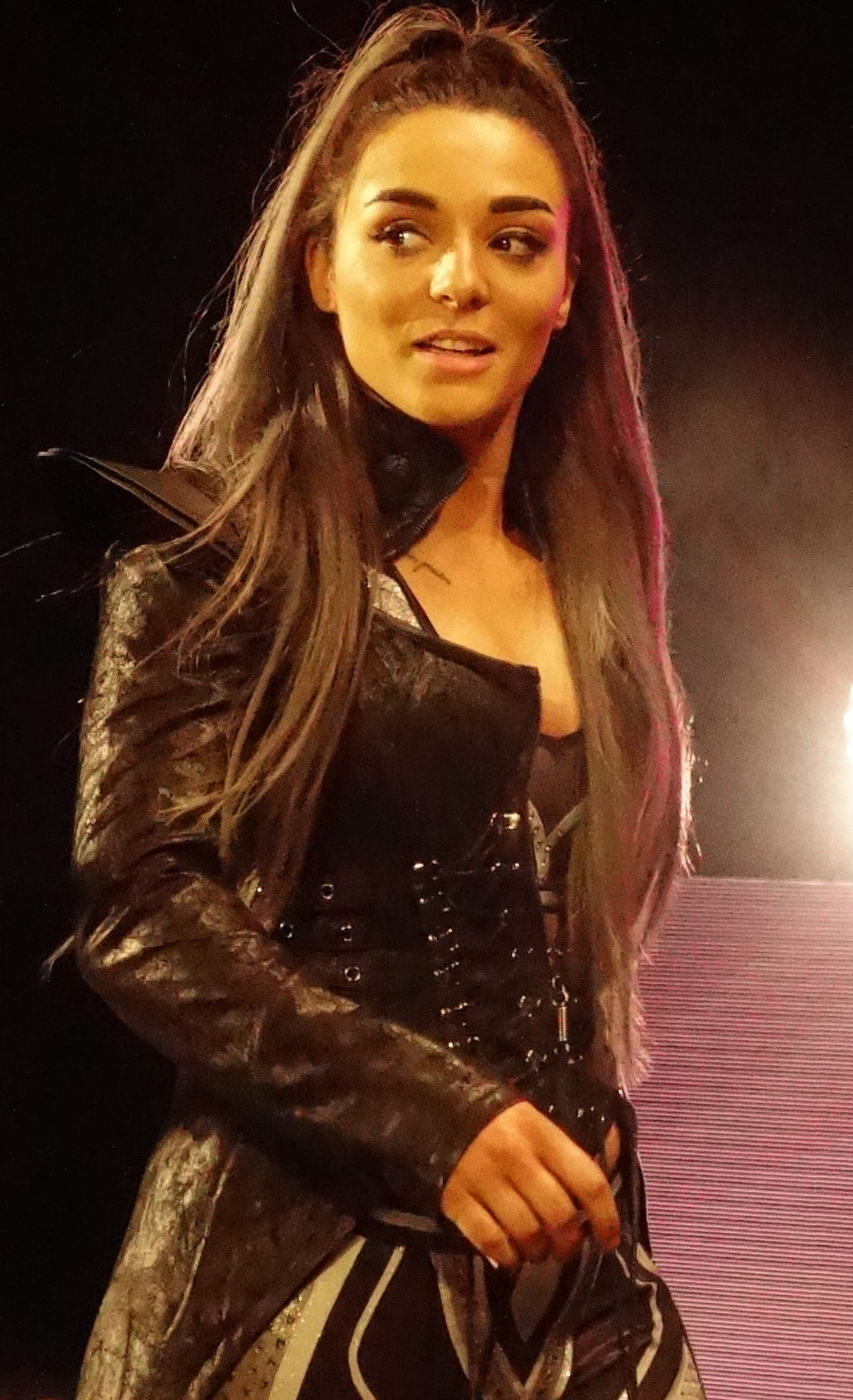
Inaugural ROH Women's Pure Champion Deonna Purrazzo.

== Championships and accomplishments ==
=== Current champions ===
The following list shows the Women of Honor that are currently holding all active Women of Honor championships in Ring of Honor Wrestling.

Championship	Current champion(s)	Reign	Date won	Days held	Location	Notes	Ref.
ROH Women's World Championship	Athena	1	December 10, 2022	1,348	Arlington, Texas	Defeated Mercedes Martinez at Final Battle.	
ROH Women's World Television Championship	Red Velvet	2	December 5, 2025	257	Columbus, Ohio	Defeated Mercedes Moné at Final Battle.	
ROH Women's Pure Championship	Deonna Purrazzo	1	December 5, 2025	257	Columbus, Ohio	Defeated Billie Starkz in a tournament final to become the inaugural champion at Final Battle.	

=== Past and retired championships ===
Championship	Final champion(s)	Date won	Date retired	Days held	Notes
Women of Honor World Championship	Kelly Klein	October 12, 2019	January 1, 2020	81	Retired after the champion Kelly Klein's contract was not renewed. The title was replaced by the new ROH Women's World Championship.
Shimmer Championship	Nicole Matthews	October 18, 2014	2014 (in ROH)	357	The championship ceased being defended at ROH events in 2014.
Shimmer Tag Team Championship	Daizee Haze and Tomoka Nakagawa	March 27, 2011	2011 (in ROH)	188	The championship ceased being defended at ROH event in 2011.

=== Women of Honor's Year–End Awards ===
Year won	Award	Winner
2007	Shimmer Wrestler of the Year	Sara Del Rey
2017	WOH Wrestler of the Year	Deonna Purrazzo
2018	WOH Wrestler of the Year	Sumie Sakai
2020	Female Wrestler of the Year	Session Moth Martina
2021	Female Wrestler of the Year	Rok-C
2021	Best New Star	Rok-C
2021	Breakout Star of the Year: Female	Quinn McKay

=== Qualifying matches ===
Ring of Honor Wrestling tapings – January and February of 2018 (And probably in November & December of 2017 as well.) (2300 Arena – Philadelphia, Pennsylvania)

No.	Results	Stipulations
1	Jessie Brooks defeated Gabby Ortiz (5:45)	Women of Honor Championship Qualifying Match
2	Brandi Rhodes defeated Stella Grey (5:50)	Women of Honor Championship Qualifying Match

=== Tournament bracket ===
First Round; ROH Wrestling / Women of Honor tapings
Mandy Leon	Pin
Madison Rayne	7:30
Jessie Brooks	8:21
Kelly Klein	Pin
HZK	11:48
Mayu Iwatani	Pin
Deonna Purrazzo	Sub
Holidead	6:18
Jenny Rose	8:37
Kagetsu	Pin
Hana Kimura	8:00
Sumie Sakai	Pin
Stacy Shadows	9:14
Tenille Dashwood	Pin
Karen Q	7:28
Brandi Rhodes	Pin

Quarterfinals; ROH Wrestling / Women of Honor tapings
Mandy Leon	9:09
Kelly Klein	KO
Mayu Iwatani	Pin
Deonna Purrazzo	9:28
Kagetsu	7:36
Sumie Sakai	Pin
Tenille Dashwood	Pin
Brandi Rhodes	7:29

Semifinals; ROH Wrestling / Women of Honor tapings
Kelly Klein	Sub
Mayu Iwatani	9:00
Sumie Sakai	Pin
Tenille Dashwood	7:53

Final; Supercard of Honor XII; April 7, 2018
Kelly Klein	7:46
Sumie Sakai	Pin

=== Tournament bracket ===
First Round^{1} ^{2} ROH Wrestling; July 30; August 7 and 14; ROH Women's Division Wednesday; August 4
Rok-C	Pin
Sumie Sakai	9:36
Mandy Leon	7:12
Quinn McKay^{3} ^{4} ^{5}	Pin
Holidead	9:18
Max the Impaler	Pin
Angelina Love	Bye
–^{6}
Alex Gracia	8:43
Miranda Alize	Pin
Mazzerati	8:45
Nicole Savoy	Pin
Willow Nightingale	11:30
Allysin Kay	Sub
Marti Belle	7:13
Trish Adora	Sub

Quarterfinals; ROH Wrestling; August 21 and 28
Rok-C	Pin
Quinn McKay	10:14
Max the Impaler	5:53
Angelina Love	DQ
Miranda Alize	Pin
Nicole Savoy	13:04
Allysin Kay	13:30
Trish Adora	Pin

Semifinals; ROH Wrestling; September 4
Rok-C	Sub
Angelina Love	6:44
Miranda Alize	Sub
Trish Adora	12:16

Final; Death Before Dishonor XVIII; September 12
Rok-C	Pin
Miranda Alize	18:13

1 Participants in the original tournament included: Ashley Vox, Gia Scott, Heather Monroe, Jenny Rose, Katarina, Kellyanne, Lindsay Snow, Maria Manic, Session Moth Martina, and Tasha Steelz.
2 Brandi Lauren and Laynie Luck were named as alternates.
3 Spot was originally meant for Vita VonStarr, but her interference in matches involving The Righteous got her removed.
4 Allie Recks was slated to take VonStarr's place in the tournament, but a knee injury kept her from competing.
5 Chelsea Green was slated to take VonStarr's place in the tournament, but a broken wrist kept her from competing.
6 Love defeated Quinn McKay on the May 8 ROH Wrestling episode to earn a bye.

==== Inaugural ROH Women's World Television Championship tournament ====
First Round; ROH Wrestling (February 15 and 22)
Kiera Hogan	6:31
Diamanté	Pin
Billie Starkz	Sub
Robyn Renegade	9:47
Mercedes Martinez	Sub
Trish Adora	9:46
Viva Van	5:48
Abadon	Pin
Rachael Ellering	10:49
Leyla Hirsch	Pin
Sandra Moone	9:01
Red Velvet	Pin
J–Rod	6:04
Queen Aminata	Pin
Sussy Love	7:19
Taya Valkyrie	Pin

Quarterfinals; ROH Wrestling (February 29, March 7 and 14)
Diamanté	11:38
Billie Starkz	Pin
Mercedes Martinez	Pin
Abadon	9:46
Leyla Hirsch	9:46
Red Velvet	Pin
Queen Aminata	Pin
Taya Valkyrie	8:52

Semifinals; ROH Wrestling (March 21)
Billie Starkz	Pin
Mercedes Martinez	11:33
Red Velvet	9:24
Queen Aminata	Pin

Final; Supercard of Honor (April 5)
Billie Starkz	Sub
Queen Aminata	17:42

1 Originally scheduled participant Lady Frost was on tour in Mexico when the tournament began, so she was removed.

==== Inaugural ROH Women's Pure Championship tournament ====
Quarterfinals; Death Before Dishonor; August 29, 2025; Ring of Honor Wrestling; September 25, 2025 – November 28, 2025
Taya Valkyrie	8:24
Queen Aminata	Pinfall
Deonna Purrazzo	Submission
Trish Adora	7:02
Billie Starkz	Pinfall
Olympia	10:46
Serena Deeb	10:31
Yuka Sakazaki	Pinfall

Semifinals; Ring of Honor Wrestling; December 4, 2025
Queen Aminata	Forfeit
Deonna Purrazzo	Bye^{1}
Billie Starkz	Pinfall
Yuka Sakazaki	10:43

Final; Final Battle; December 5, 2025
Deonna Purrazzo	Submission
Billie Starkz	13:51

1 Aminata forfeited her semifinal match to Purrazzo due to a neck injury.

== Inaugural championship holders ==
The following list shows the first ever Ring of Honor and partnered with Ring of Honor Shimmer Women Athletes Women's Championship winners and the years that the titles were first ever won by Women of Ring of Honor in Ring of Honor history.

Championships	Women of Honor (ROH_WOH)	Company	Year(s)
Shimmer Championship	Sara Del Ray	Shimmer Women Athletes (Jointed with, Used by, and Borrowed by ROH) and Ring of Honor Wrestling (ROH); Partnered (2002–2011)	2007–2014
Shimmer Tag Team Championship	Ashley Lane and Nevaeh	Shimmer Women Athletes (Jointed with, Used by, and Borrowed by ROH) and Ring of Honor Wrestling (ROH); Partnered (2002–2011)	2008–2011
Women of Honor Championship	Sumie Sakai	Ring of Honor Wrestling (ROH)	2017–2020
ROH Women's World Championship	Rok-C	Ring of Honor Wrestling (ROH)	2020–present
ROH Women's World Television Championship	Billie Starkz	Ring of Honor Wrestling (ROH)	2023–present
ROH Women's Pure Championship	Deonna Purrazzo	Ring of Honor Wrestling (ROH)	2025–present

== Pro Wrestling Illustrated ==
=== PWI Female 50 / Women's 100 / Women's 150 / Women's 250 ===
Year	1	2	3	4	5	6	7	8	9	10
PWI Female 50
2008	-	-	-	-	MsChif	Sara Del Rey	-	-	-	-
2009	-	-	-	MsChif	-	-	-	-	-	-
2010	-	-	-	-	-	-	-	-	MsChif	-
2011	-	-	-	-	-	-	-	-	MsChif	Sara Del Rey
2012	-	-	-	Sara Del Rey	-	-	-	-	-	-
2013	-	-	-	-	-	-	-	Tara	-	-
PWI Female 100 / PWI Women's 100 / PWI Women's 250
2018	-	-	-	-	-	-	-	-	Mayu Iwatani	-
2019	-	-	-	-	-	-	-	-	-	Nicole Savoy
2023	-	-	-	-	-	Athena	-	Willow Nightingale	-	-
2024	-	-	-	-	-	-	-	-	-	Athena
2025	Mercedes Mone	-		-	-	-	Athena	-	-	-

=== PWI Year–End Awards ===
Year Won	Award	Wrestler
2012	Rookie of the Year	Veda Scott

== Current Women's division ==
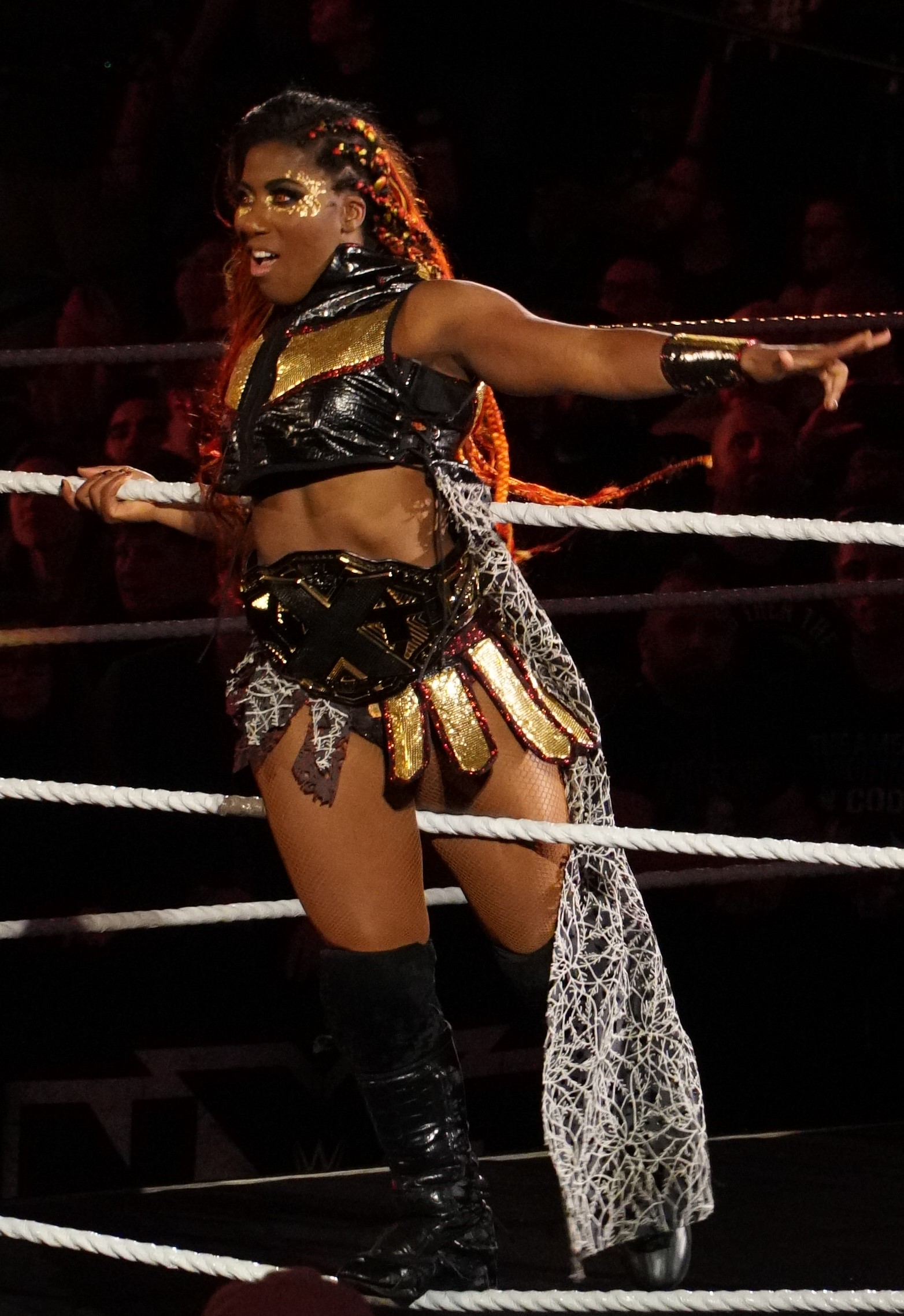
Athena

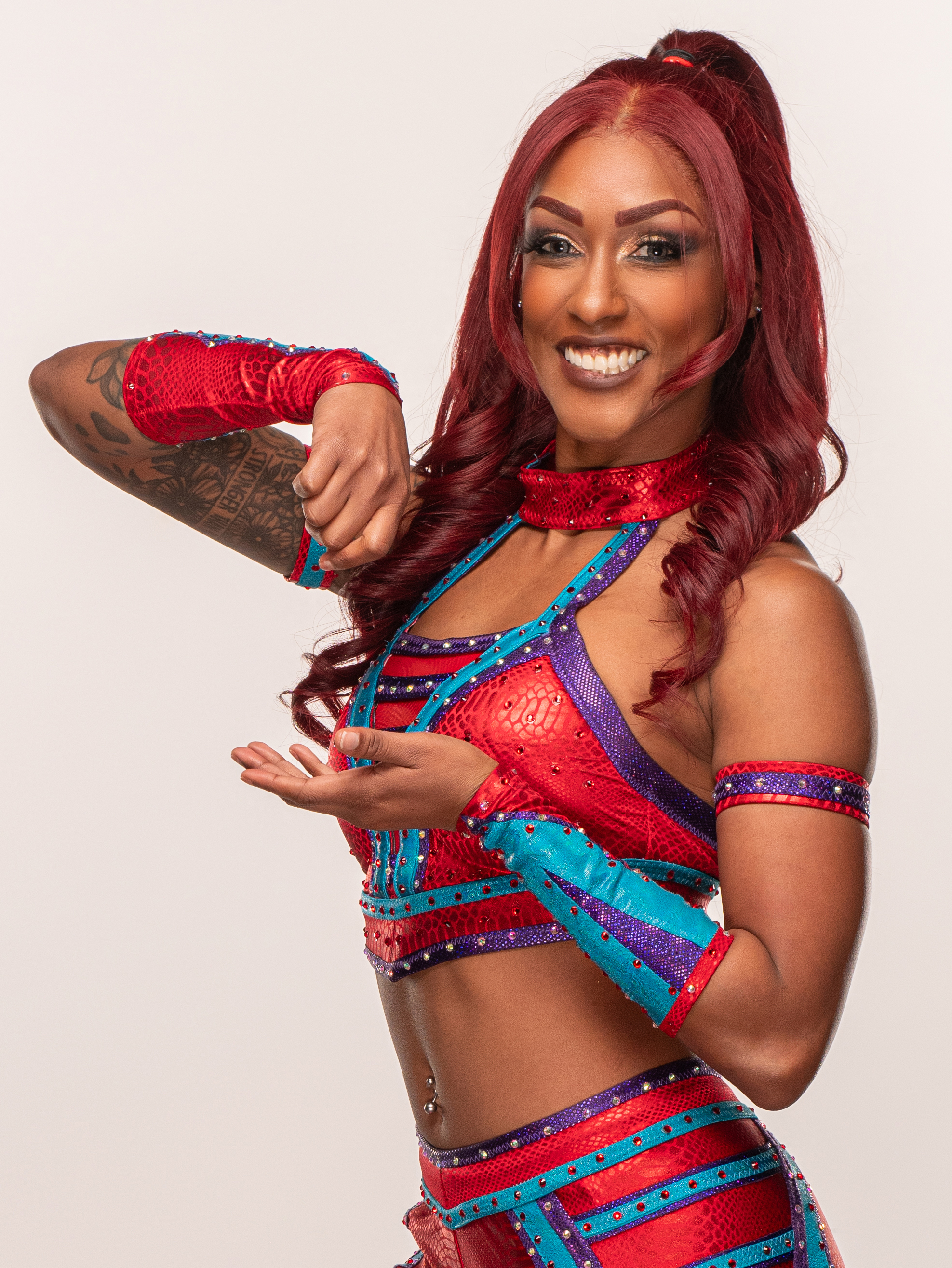
Red Velvet

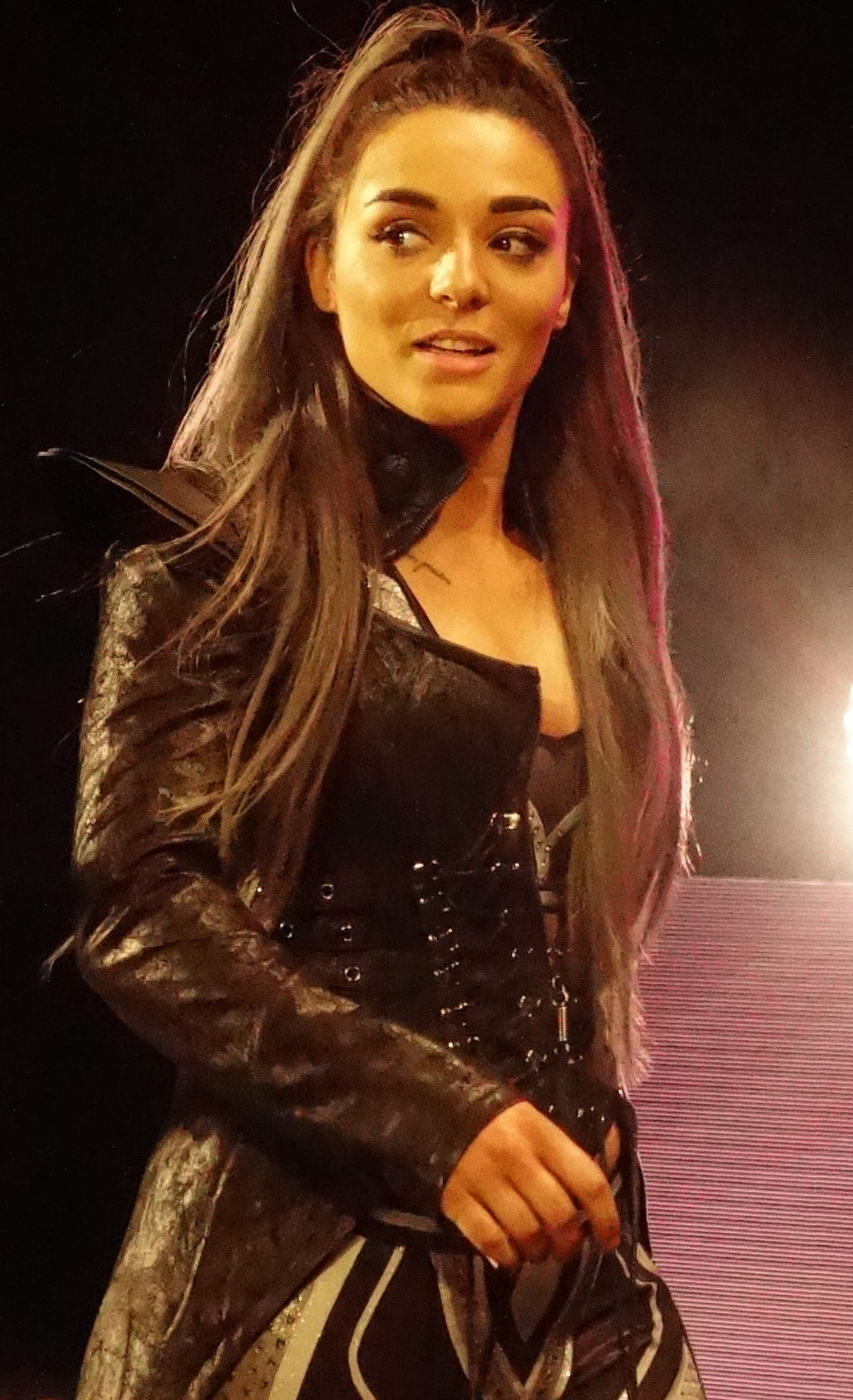
Deonna Purrazzo

Ring name	Real name	Notes
Athena	Adrienne Palmer	ROH Women's World Champion
Billie Starkz	Lillian Bridget	
Cassie Lee	Cassandra Arneill	Member of The IInspiration
Charlette Renegade	Charlette Williamson	
Christyan XO	Christyan Ried	
Deonna Purrazzo	Deonna Purrazzo	Women's Pure Champion
Diamante	Priscilla Zúñiga	
Hyan	Hyaneyoung Gerard	
Jessie McKay	Jessica McKay	Member of The IInspiration
Lacey Lane	Allysa Lane	
Leila Grey	Unknown	
Marina Shafir	Marina Shafir	
Mina Shirakawa	Mina Shirakawa	
Maya World	Ashanti Wilson-Stevenson	
Queen Aminata	Aminata Sylla	
Rachael Ellering	Rachael Ellering	
Red Velvet	Stephanie Cardona	Women's World Television Champion
Robyn Renegade	Robin Williamson	
Serena Deeb	Serena Deeb	Coach
Stori Denali	Mia Grunze	
Taya Valkyrie	Kira Magnin-Forster	
Trish Adora	Patrice McNair	
Zayda Steel	Fatima Zahra	
