= Death Before Dishonor XVI =

2018 professional wrestling event

- Promotion: Ring of Honor
- Date: September 28, 2018
- City: Paradise, Nevada
- Venue: Orleans Arena
- Attendance: 2,000

Pay-per-view chronology
← Previous; Honor RE United	Next → Glory By Honor XVI

Death Before Dishonor chronology
← Previous; XV	Next → XVII

Death Before Dishonor XVI was a two night professional wrestling event produced by Ring of Honor (ROH), which took place on September 28 and 29, 2018, at Orleans Arena in Paradise, Nevada. The first night was a pay-per-view broadcast, while night two was a set of TV tapings for the company's flagship program Ring of Honor Wrestling.

Wrestlers from New Japan Pro-Wrestling (NJPW) — with which ROH has a partnership — also appeared on the card.

== Storylines ==
Death Before Dishonor XVI will feature professional wrestling matches, involving different wrestlers from pre-existing scripted feuds, plots, and storylines that played out on ROH's television programs. Wrestlers portrayed villains or heroes as they followed a series of events that built tension and culminated in a wrestling match or series of matches.

The main event of Death Before Dishonor XVI featured Jay Lethal defending the ROH World Championship against Will Ospreay. On August 25, 2018, during the Ring of Honor Wrestling tapings, Ospreay returned to ROH in a pre-taped vignette, challenging Lethal to a match for the ROH World Championship. Afterwards, Lethal accepted the match.

In the Women of Honor World Championship match, Sumie Sakai defended her title against Tenille Dashwood. On August 25, 2018, during the Ring of Honor Wrestling tapings, after Sakai defeated Tasha Steelz, Sakai stated that defeating Dashwood would validate her championship reign. Dashwood then came to the ring and accepted the challenge. Sakai had previously defeated Dashwood in the semifinals of the Women of Honor Championship on April 7 at Supercard of Honor XII.

== Results ==
Night One (PPV)

No.	Results	Stipulations	Times
1^{D}	Shane Taylor defeated Cheeseburger	Singles match	—
2^{D}	Jonathan Gresham defeated Beer City Bruiser	Singles match	—
3	Kenny King defeated Jushin Liger	Singles match	11:50
4	The Briscoes (Jay Briscoe and Mark Briscoe) (c) defeated The Addiction (Christopher Daniels and Frankie Kazarian) (with Scorpio Sky)	Tag team match for the ROH World Tag Team Championship	17:40
5	Sumie Sakai (c) defeated Tenille Dashwood by technical submission	Singles match for the Women of Honor World Championship	12:30
6	Punishment Martinez (c) defeated Chris Sabin	Singles match for the ROH World Television Championship	8:00
7	Bully Ray and Silas Young defeated Flip Gordon and Colt Cabana	Tables match	13:40
8	Bullet Club Elite (Cody, Marty Scurll, Adam Page, Matt Jackson and Nick Jackson) (with Brandi Rhodes) defeated Chaos (Kazuchika Okada, Chuckie T., Beretta, Rocky Romero, and Tomohiro Ishii)	Ten-man tag team match	21:00
9	Jay Lethal (c) defeated Will Ospreay	Singles match for the ROH World Championship	22:55
(c) / – the champion(s) heading into the match; D / – this was a dark match

Night Two (TV Tapings)

No.	Results	Stipulations
1^{D}	Luchasaurus defeated Hyperstreak	Singles match
2	Kenny King defeated Chase Owens	Singles match
3	Nick Aldis defeated Christopher Daniels	Singles match
4	The Briscoes (Jay Briscoe and Mark Briscoe) (c) defeated Coast 2 Coast (LSG and Shaheem Ali)	Tag team match for the ROH World Tag Team Championship
5	Jeff Cobb defeated Punishment Martinez (c)	Singles match for the ROH World Television Championship
6	Marty Scurll defeated Chris Sabin	Singles match
7	Brandi Rhodes defeated Heather Monroe	Singles match
8	Adam Page defeated Scorpio Sky	Singles match
9	Shane Taylor defeated Eli Isom	Singles match
10	Jay Lethal and Jonathan Gresham defeated Jushin Liger and Kushida	Tag team match
11	Cody (c) defeated Willie Mack	Singles match for the NWA Worlds Heavyweight Championship
12	The Young Bucks (Matt Jackson and Nick Jackson) defeated The Addiction (Christopher Daniels and Frankie Kazarian), Best Friends (Beretta and Chuckie T.), and Los Ingobernables de Japón (Evil and Sanada)	Four Corner Survival tag team match
(c) / – the champion(s) heading into the match; D / – this was a dark match
