= ROH Honor Reigns Supreme (2019) =

2019 Ring of Honor event

Honor Reigns Supreme (2019)
- Promotion: Ring of Honor
- Date: January 13, 2019
- City: Concord, North Carolina
- Venue: Cabarrus Arena

Pay-per-view chronology
← Previous; Final Battle	Next → Road to G1 Supercard

Honor Reigns Supreme chronology
← Previous; 2018	Next → 2020

Honor Reigns Supreme 2019 was a professional wrestling livestreaming event produced by Ring of Honor (ROH), that took place on January 13, 2019, at the Cabarrus Arena in Concord, North Carolina. The event was streamed live on ROH's Honor Club online streaming service.

== Production ==
Other on-screen personnel
Role	Name
Commentators	Caprice Coleman
Commentators	Colt Cabana
Commentators	Ian Riccaboni
Commentators	Kenny King
Commentators	Nick Aldis

=== Storylines ===
Honor Reigns Supreme 2019 features professional wrestling matches, which involve different wrestlers from pre-existing scripted feuds, plots, and storylines that play out on ROH's television programs. Wrestlers portray villains or heroes as they follow a series of events that build tension and culminate in a wrestling match or series of matches.

== Results ==
No.	Results	Stipulations	Times
1^{D}	Dante Caballero and Joe Keys defeated Griff Garrison and Marcus Kross	Tag team match	—
2^{D}	Brian Johnson defeated Rayo	Singles match	—
3	Cheeseburger, Eli Isom and Ryan Nova defeated Josey Quinn, Corey Hollis and John Skyler	Six-man tag team match	5:39
4	Mark Haskins defeated Beer City Bruiser	Singles match	6:51
5	Lifeblood (David Finlay and Juice Robinson) defeated Best Friends (Beretta and Chuckie T.)	Tag team match	14:49
6	Tracy Williams defeated Flip Gordon	Singles match	2:56
7	The Kingdom (Matt Taven, T. K. O'Ryan and Vinny Marseglia) defeated Shane Hurricane Helms, Delirious and Luchasaurus	Six-man tag team match	13:52
8	Bandido defeated P. J. Black	Singles match	13:46
9	Jeff Cobb defeated Shane Taylor, Jonathan Gresham and Rhett Titus	Four Corner Survival match	8:25
10	Kelly Klein (c) defeated Jenny Rose	Street Fight for the Women of Honor World Championship	12:33
11	Villain Enterprises (Marty Scurll, Brody King and PCO) defeated Silas Young and The Briscoes (Jay Briscoe and Mark Briscoe)	Six-man tag team match	17:08
12	Jay Lethal (c) defeated Dalton Castle	Singles match for the ROH World Championship	16:09
(c) / – the champion(s) heading into the match; D / – this was a dark match

== See also ==
- 2019 in professional wrestling
- List of Ring of Honor pay-per-view events
