= Final Battle (2018) =

2018 Ring of Honor pay-per-view event

- Promotional poster featuring ROH Roster
- Promotion: Ring of Honor
- Date: December 14, 2018
- City: New York City, New York
- Venue: Hammerstein Ballroom
- Attendance: 1,800

Pay-per-view chronology
← Previous; Global Wars	Next → Honor Reigns Supreme

Final Battle chronology
← Previous; 2017	Next → 2019

Final Battle (2018) was a professional wrestling pay-per-view (PPV) event produced by Ring of Honor (ROH). The four-hour long event took place on December 14, 2018, at the Hammerstein Ballroom in New York City, New York. It was the 17th event under the Final Battle chronology, and would be the final appearances of Cody, The Young Bucks, & Adam Page in Ring of Honor.

== Storylines ==
Final Battle 2018 featured professional wrestling matches, which involve different wrestlers from pre-existing scripted feuds, plots, and storylines that play out on ROH's television programs. Wrestlers portrayed villains or heroes as they follow a series of events that build tension and culminate in a wrestling match or series of matches.

== Event ==
Other on-screen personnel
Role	Name
Commentators	Colt Cabana
Commentators	Caprice Coleman (ROH World title match)
Commentators	Ian Riccaboni
Ring announcer	Bobby Cruise
Referees	Todd Sinclair
Referees	Paul Turner

The pay-per-view opened with Eli Isom faced Kenny King. Isom performed a gory bomb for a near-fall. In the end, King performed the Royal Flush to win the match.

Next, Jeff Cobb defended the ROH World Television Championship against Adam Page. Page performed a fallaway slam on Cobb. Page countered Cobb's finisher Tour of the Islands into a crucifix for a near-fall. In the end, Cobb performed couple of Tour of the Islands to retain the title.

After that, Sumie Sakai defended the Women of Honor World Championship in a Four Corner Survival match against Kelly Klein, Madison Rayne and Karen Q. Mandy Leon joined to the commentary for this match. Klein eliminated Q after she performed the K-Power. Sakai performed the Smash Mouth on Rayne, and Klein pinned Rayne. In the end, Klein performed an avalanche K-Power to win the title for the first time. Klein and Sakai hugged after the match.

Later, Zack Sabre Jr. made his ROH debut as he faced Jonathan Gresham. During the match, both wrestlers traded submission holds. In the end, Gresham went for a springboard moonsault, but Sabre countered it into a European Clutch to win the match.

Next, Matt Taven (accompanied by T. K. O'Ryan) faced Dalton Castle (accompanied by The Boys). During the match, Taven went for a suicide dive, however, when Castle moved away, Taven landed on the steel barricade. In the end, Taven avoided Castle's finisher and performed the Climax to win the match.

After that, Christopher Daniels faced Marty Scurll in a singles match for Scurll's number one contender spot to the ROH World Championship. Daniels performed a Burning Hammer for a near-fall. Daniels performed a Tombstone Piledriver for a near-fall. Scrull countered Daniels's finisher Best Moonsault Ever by raising his knees. In the climax, Scurll forced Daniels to submit to the crossface chickenwing to win the match.

Later, as Daniels posed on the second ropes as the crowd cheered for him, Bully Ray came into the ring and attacked him with a low blow. Ray called out Flip Gordon for their "I Quit" match. Gordon came to the match with the American flag. Ray grabbed Gordon's girlfriend who sat in the front row, and threatened to powerbomb her through a table in an attempt to make Gordon quit. Cary Silkin attacked Ray with a kendo stick, and as Ray was distracted, Gordon's girlfriend low blowed him. Silas Young attacked Gordon, and fought Colt Cabana and Cheeseburger who came to the aid of Gordon. In the climax, the lights went off and on, and the ECW legend The Sandman stood in the ring. He attacked Young with a kendo stick, and later handed it to Gordon, who hit Ray with it multiple times and forced him to quit.

In the penultimate match, Jay Lethal defended the ROH World Championship against Cody (accompanied by Brandi Rhodes). Before the match begun, Cody did a promo where he announced he’s leaving Ring of Honor after his match. Lethal accidentally almost kicked the referee, Brandi used this opportunity and speared Lethal, and Cody pinned him for a near-fall. Brandi accidentally speared Cody and received the Lethal Injection from Lethal. Cody performed the Cross Rhodes for a near-fall. Cody locked a figure-four leglock and thought that he won, although Lethal never tapped. In the end, Lethal forced Cody to submit to a figure-four leglock of his own to retain the title. After the match, Scrull entered the ring and went face to face with Lethal, as the NWA World Heavyweight Champion Nick Aldis (accompanied by Kamille), applauded from the ramp.

=== Main event ===
In the main event, SoCal Uncensored (Frankie Kazarian and Scorpio Sky) defended the ROH World Tag Team Championship against The Briscoes (Jay Briscoe and Mark Briscoe) and The Young Bucks (Matt Jackson and Nick Jackson) in Ladder War IX. Jay pushed Nick from a ladder into a table. In the climax, Jay pulled the belts and The Briscoes won the titles for the tenth time.

== Results ==
No.	Results	Stipulations	Times
1^{D}	Best Friends (Trent Beretta & Chuckie T) defeated The Bouncers (Brian Milonas & The Beer City Bruiser) and The Kingdom (TK O'Ryan & Vinny Marseglia)	Triple threat Tag team match	—
2	Kenny King defeated Eli Isom	Singles match	08:55
3	Jeff Cobb (c) defeated Adam Page	Singles match for the ROH World Television Championship	13:35
4	Kelly Klein defeated Sumie Sakai (c), Madison Rayne and Karen Q	Four Corner Survival match for the Women of Honor World Championship	13:40
5	Zack Sabre Jr. defeated Jonathan Gresham	Singles match	11:50
6	Matt Taven (with T. K. O'Ryan) defeated Dalton Castle (with The Boys)	Singles match for the “Real World Title”	15:50
7	Marty Scurll defeated Christopher Daniels by submission	Singles match for Scurll's #1 contendership to the ROH World Championship	17:30
8	Flip Gordon defeated Bully Ray	"I Quit" match	14:25
9	Jay Lethal (c) defeated Cody (with Brandi Rhodes) by submission	Singles match for the ROH World Championship	23:45
10	The Briscoes (Jay Briscoe and Mark Briscoe) defeated SoCal Uncensored (Frankie Kazarian and Scorpio Sky) (c) and The Young Bucks (Matt Jackson and Nick Jackson)	Ladder War IX for the ROH World Tag Team Championship	22:40
(c) / – the champion(s) heading into the match; D / – this was a dark match

=== Four Corner Survival match ===
Eliminated	Wrestler	Eliminated by	Method of elimination	Time
1	Karen Q	Kelly Klein	Pinned after the K-Power	7:00
2	Madison Rayne	Kelly Klein	Pinned after the Smash Mouth from Sumie Sakai	7:55
3	Sumie Sakai (c)	Kelly Klein	Pinned after a K-Power from the top rope	13:40
Winner	Kelly Klein			13:40

== See also ==
- 2018 in professional wrestling
- List of Ring of Honor pay-per-view events
