= Holidead =

American professional wrestler

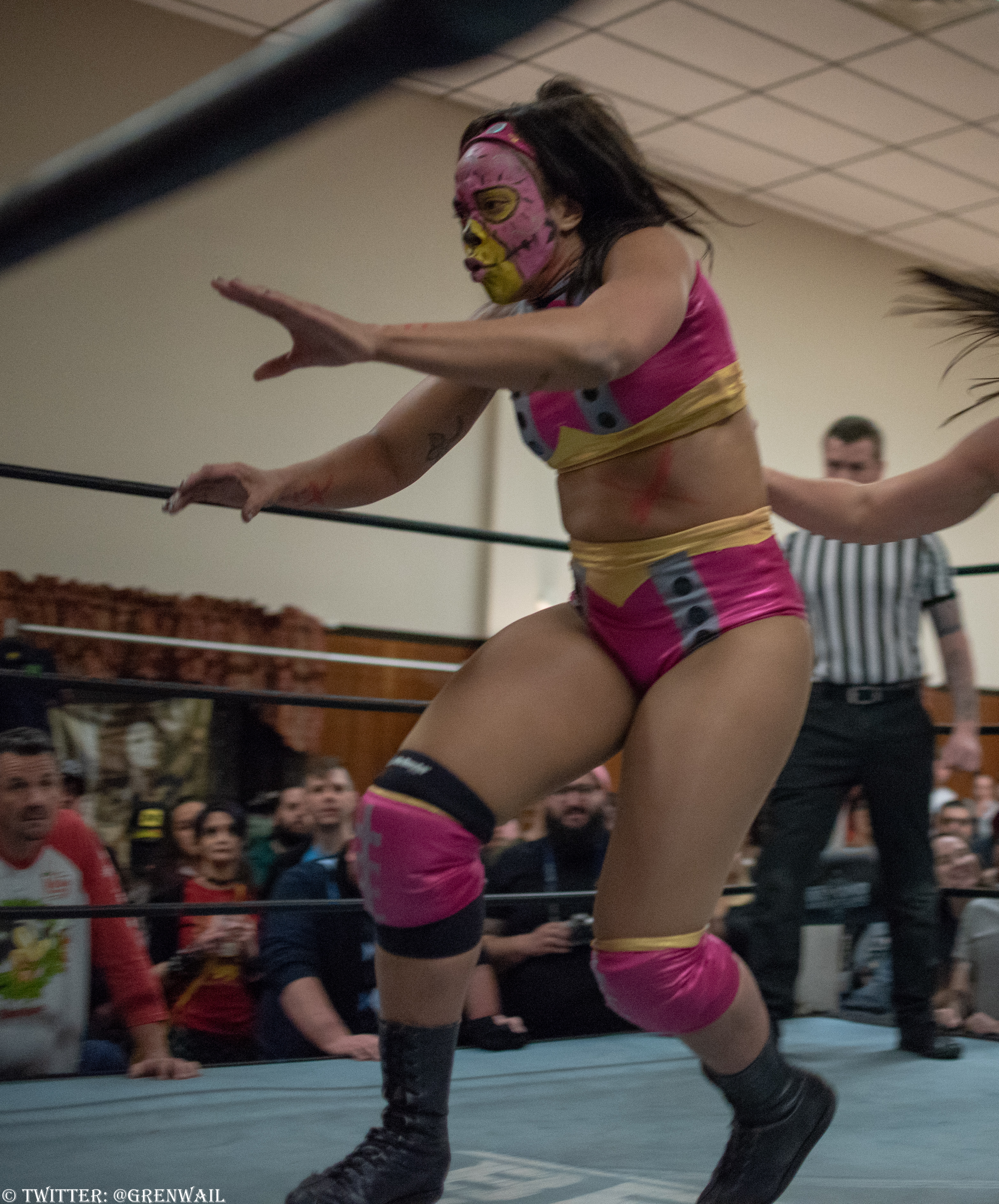
- Holidead in March 2019

Personal information
- Born: Camille Ligon; July 21, 1986 (age 40) Cleveland, Ohio, U.S.

Professional wrestling career
- Ring names: Blue Holiday; Cami Fields; Holidead; Kairian 2.0; Osore
- Billed height: 5 ft 4 in (1.63 m)
- Billed weight: 150 lb (68 kg)
- Trained by: Knokx Pro Wrestling Academy; Gangrel; Reno Anoa'i; Rikishi
- Debut: November 16, 2013

Camille Ligon (born July 21, 1986), known by her ring name Holidead, is an American professional wrestler. She is best known for her stints in Ring of Honor (ROH) and Major League Wrestling (MLW).

== Professional wrestling career ==
=== World Wonder Ring Stardom (2015–2016) ===
At Mask Fiesta 2015 on October 25, 2015, Holidead, wrestling under the ring name Kairian 2.0, lost to Act Ranger.

=== Ring of Honor (2017–2021) ===
In 2017, Holidead debuted in Ring of Honor Wrestling (ROH), in a One-on-one match against Sumie Sakai but was unsuccessful. Afterwards Holidead entered the Women of Honor Championship tournament in 2018 but lost to Deonna Purrazzo in the first round via submission.

In 2021 Holiday returned to Ring of Honor but this time it was to enter the ROH Women's World Championship tournament after the ROH Women of Honor title had been retired due to then Kelly Klein's contract dispute with the ROH owner. Holidead returned in the ROH Women's World Title tournament against Max the Impaler but was unsuccessful as Max The Impaler defeated her in the One-on-one female powerhouse match-up via pinfall.

Holidead competed in several ROH Women's matches, including unsuccessfully challenging Rok-C for the ROH Women's World Championship but later disappeared from Ring of Honor.

=== Major League Wrestling (2021–2022) ===
On the September 22, 2021, episode of Fusion: Alpha, MLW officially announced the launch of its women's featherweight division and Holidead was introduced as one of the first female wrestlers on the roster. On April 21, 2022, MLW announced that the MLW Women's Featherweight Championship would be decided at Kings of Colosseum, where Holidead would face the returning Taya Valkyrie. At the event, Valkyrie won the title.

== Championships and accomplishments ==
- Crossfire Wrestling
  - CW Women's Championship (1 time)
- Mission Pro Wrestling
  - MPW Championship (1 time)
  - MPW Year-End Award (3 times)
    - Match of the Year Award (2021) vs. Jennacide in a Falls count anywhere match on May 1
    - Match of the Year Award (2022) vs. LuFisto in a No disqualification match on April 2
    - Wrestler of the Year Award (2022)
- Pro Wrestling Illustrated
  - Ranked No. 82 of the top 150 female wrestlers in the PWI Women's 150 in 2021
- Renegade Wrestling Alliance
  - RWA Women's Championship (2 times)
- Resistance Pro Wrestling
  - Resistance Women's Championship (1 time)
- Shine Wrestling
  - Shine Tag Team Championship (1 time) – with Thunder Rosa
- Vendetta Pro Wrestling
  - Vendetta Pro/NWA International Tag Team Championship (1 time) – with Thunder Rosa
- International Wrestling Cartel
  - IWC Women's Championship (1 time)
