= Death Before Dishonor XVII =

2019 Ring of Honor pay-per-view

- Promotional poster featuring several ROH wrestlers
- Promotion: Ring of Honor
- Date: September 27, 2019 (PPV); September 28, 2019 (TV tapings)
- City: Sunrise Manor, Nevada
- Venue: Sam's Town Hotel and Gambling Hall
- Attendance: Night 1: 800; Night 2: 450

Pay-per-view chronology
← Previous; Best in the World (2019)	Next → Final Battle (2019)

Death Before Dishonor chronology
← Previous; XVI	Next → XVIII

Death Before Dishonor XVII was a two-night professional wrestling event produced by American promotion Ring of Honor (ROH), which took place Friday, September 27 and Saturday September 28, 2019, at the Sam's Town Hotel and Gambling Hall in the Las Vegas suburb of Sunrise Manor, Nevada. Friday's show was a pay-per-view broadcast, while Saturday's was a set of tapings for ROH's flagship program Ring of Honor Wrestling.

== Production ==
=== Storylines ===
Other on-screen personnel
Role:	Name:
Commentators	Ian Riccaboni
Commentators	Caprice Coleman

This professional wrestling event featured professional wrestling matches, which involve different wrestlers from pre-existing scripted feuds, plots, and storylines that play out on ROH's television programs. Wrestlers portray villains or heroes as they follow a series of events that build tension and culminate in a wrestling match or series of matches.

== Results ==
=== Night 1 ===
No.	Results	Stipulations	Times
1^{P}	Jeff Cobb defeated Brody King	Singles match	12:50
2	Marty Scurll defeated Colt Cabana	First round match in the Final Battle ROH World Championship #1 contender tournament	14:25
3	PCO defeated Kenny King	No Disqualification first round match in the Final Battle ROH World Championship #1 contender tournament	11:48
4	Angelina Love (with Mandy Leon) defeated Kelly Klein (c)	Singles match for the Women of Honor World Championship	9:06
5	Jonathan Gresham defeated Jay Lethal by submission	Singles match	17:20
6	The Bouncers (Beer City Bruiser and Brawler Milonas) defeated Vinny Marseglia and Silas Young	Barroom Brawl	14:30
7	Shane Taylor (c) defeated Flip Gordon, Tracy Williams and Dragon Lee	Four Corner Survival match for the ROH World Television Championship	8:26
8	The Briscoe Brothers (Jay Briscoe and Mark Briscoe) (c) defeated LifeBlood (Bandido and Mark Haskins)	Tag team match for the ROH World Tag Team Championship	20:16
9	Rush defeated Matt Taven (c)	Singles match for the ROH World Championship	16:05
(c) / – the champion(s) heading into the match; P / – the match was broadcast on the pre-show

=== Night 2 (TV tapings) ===
No.	Results	Stipulations
1^{D}	Joe Hendry defeated Dom Kubrick	Singles match
2^{D}	The Bouncers (Beer City Bruiser and Brawler Milonas) defeated Coast 2 Coast (LSG and Shaheem Ali)	Tag team match
3^{D}	Silas Young and Josh Woods defeated Chris Bey and Slice Boogie	Tag team match
4^{D}	Angelina Love (c) defeated Sumie Sakai and Jenny Rose	Triple threat match for the Women of Honor World Championship
5	Dak Draper defeated Austin Gunn	2019 Top Prospect Tournament final
6	Dalton Castle defeated Mark Haskins	First round match in the Final Battle ROH World Championship #1 contender tournament
7	Jay Lethal defeated P. J. Black	First round match in the Final Battle ROH World Championship #1 contender tournament
8	Bateman defeated Jake Atlas	Singles match
9	Kenny King, Josh Woods, Jeff Cobb and Brian Johnson defeated Silas Young, Rhett Titus, Joe Hendry and Cheeseburger	Vegas Wild-Card eight-man tag team match Team members are picked via random draw
10	Tracy Williams defeated Flip Gordon	No Disqualification match
11	Villain Enterprises (Marty Scurll, Brody King and PCO) (c) defeated The Briscoe Brothers (Jay Briscoe and Mark Briscoe) and Dragon Lee	Six-man tag team match for the ROH World Six-Man Tag Team Championship
(c) / – the champion(s) heading into the match; D / – this was a dark match

== See also ==
- 2019 in professional wrestling
