= Final Battle (2017) =

Professional wrestling event

- Promotional poster for the event, featuring Cody and Dalton Castle
- Promotion: Ring of Honor
- Date: December 15, 2017
- City: New York City, New York
- Venue: Hammerstein Ballroom
- Attendance: 1,800

Pay-per-view chronology
← Previous; Global Wars	Next → 16th Anniversary Show

Final Battle chronology
← Previous; 2016	Next → 2018

Final Battle (2017) was the 16th Final Battle professional wrestling pay-per-view (PPV) event produced by Ring of Honor (ROH). It took place on December 15, 2017, at the Hammerstein Ballroom in New York City, New York.

== Storylines ==
Final Battle 2017 features professional wrestling matches, which involve different wrestlers from pre-existing scripted feuds, plots, and storylines. Wrestlers portray villains or heroes as they follow a series of events that build tension and culminate in a wrestling match or series of matches.

At War of the Worlds UK: Liverpool, ROH World Champion Cody defeated Sanada. After the match, he proclaimed that he had beaten everyone, but Dalton Castle interrupted. Cody avoided a confrontation and attacked Castle the next night, injuring Castle's shoulder. At Global Wars: Chicago, Cody was taking pictures with fans prior to his match, only for one of the fans to be a masked Castle. Castle later issued a challenge for Cody's championship, which was made official.

== Event ==
Other on-screen personnel
Role:	Name:
Commentators	Colt Cabana
Commentators	Ian Riccaboni
Ring announcer	Bobby Cruise
Referees	Todd Sinclair
Referees	Paul Turner
Referees	Mike Posey

=== Preliminary matches ===
The event opened with Matt Taven, accompanied by Kingdom teammates T. K. O'Ryan and Vinny Marseglia, facing Will Ospreay. Taven performed the Climax on Ospreay after countering the OsCutter. for the win.

Next, War Machine faced The Addiction. War Machine performed the Fallout On Christopher Daniels, and Raymond Rowe made the cover to score the win.

After that, Jay Lethal faced off against Marty Scurll.In the end as Scurll attempted a chickenwing, Lethal attempted to hit Scurll with his own umbrella, but Scurll ducked and hit a European Uppercut on Lethal, knocking the umbrella out of his hand. As referee Todd Sinclair reached for the umbrella, Lethal low blowed Scurll and performed the Lethal Injection on Scrull to win the match.

Later, The Motor City Machine Guns (Chris Sabin and Alex Shelley) defended the ROH World Tag Team Championship against The Best Friends (Chuckie T. and Barretta). The Best Friends went for a double tag team move, after Chuckie performed on Sabin a piledriver, Chris Sabin was able to roll Beretta, the legal wrestler in the match, into a Jackknife, to retain the title.

Next, Kenny King defended the ROH World Television Championship in a Four-way elimination match against Punishment Martinez, Silas Young (accompanied by The Beer City Bruiser) and Shane Taylor. Taylor was the first to be eliminated. While Bruiser distracted the referee, Young hit King with a beer bottle to eliminate him as well. Young later performed the Misery on Martinez to win the championship.

Later, The Briscoes (Mark and Jay) faced Bully Ray and Tommy Dreamer in a New York Street Fight. Bully performed a plash on Jay through a table for a near fall. Dreamer gave him fluid as Ray attempted to light another table on fire. Mark hit him with an enzuigiri and the Briscoes performed "3B", their parody of the Dudley Boyz move 3D. As Jay held Bully down on the table, Mark performed the Froggy Bow on Ray through a table, and Jay pinned Ray to score the win.

Before the penultimate match, lead announcer Ian Riccaboni introduced the new Women of Honor Championship. Riccaboni announced that a tournament for the championship will start on January 20, 2018.

After that, The Hung Bucks defended the ROH World Six-Man Tag Team Championship against Dragon Lee, Flip Gordon and Titán. When Gordon attempted a springboard moonsault, all Hung Buck members superkicked him. They stacked Gordon and Dragon Lee on Page and hit a combination of the Indy Taker and Rite of Passage as Matt pinned Gordon to retain the title.

=== Main event ===
Cody, accompanied by his wife Brandi Rhodes, defended the ROH World Championship against Dalton Castle, who was accompanied by The Boys. Castle performed the Bang-A-Rang on Cody to win the match and the title, giving Castle his first singles title in ROH.

== Reception ==
Larry Csonka of 411Mania rated the show "average", calling the tag team title match "disappointing", the TV title match "bad" and the street fight "lethargic". Wade Keller of Pro Wrestling Torch called the main event "solid ... but not must-see or epic by any means", adding that it "didn't do anything to change the perception that Cody is good for a solid three-star-and-change type of match, but not much better".

== Results ==
No.	Results	Stipulations	Times
1^{P}	The Dawgs (Rhett Titus and Will Ferrara) defeated Cheeseburger and Delirious	Tag team match	—
2^{P}	Jonathan Gresham defeated Josh Woods	Singles match	—
3	Matt Taven (with T. K. O'Ryan and Vinny Marseglia) defeated Will Ospreay	Singles match	10:58
4	War Machine (Hanson and Raymond Rowe) defeated The Addiction (Christopher Daniels and Frankie Kazarian)	Tag team match	9:35
5	Jay Lethal defeated Marty Scurll	Singles match	15:55
6	The Motor City Machine Guns (Alex Shelley and Chris Sabin) (c) defeated Best Friends (Beretta and Chuckie T.)	Tag team match for the ROH World Tag Team Championship	10:20
7	Silas Young (with Beer City Bruiser) defeated Kenny King (c), Punishment Martinez and Shane Taylor	Four-way elimination match for the ROH World Television Championship	17:25
8	The Briscoes (Jay Briscoe and Mark Briscoe) defeated Bully Ray and Tommy Dreamer	New York Street Fight	16:30
9	The Hung Bucks (Adam Page, Matt Jackson and Nick Jackson) (c) defeated Dragon Lee, Flip Gordon and Titán	Six-man tag team match for the ROH World Six-Man Tag Team Championship	15:11
10	Dalton Castle (with The Boys) defeated Cody (c) (with Brandi Rhodes)	Singles match for the ROH World Championship	12:55
(c) / – the champion(s) heading into the match; P / – the match was broadcast on the pre-show

=== ROH World Television Championship match ===
Eliminated	Wrestler	Eliminated by	Method of elimination	Time
1	Shane Taylor	Punishment Martinez	Pinned after a springboard corkscrew senton	9:20
2	Kenny King	Silas Young	Pinned after Young hit him with a beer bottle	13:05
3	Punishment Martinez	Silas Young	Pinned after a Misery	17:25
Winner	Silas Young		—N/a	17:25

== See also ==
- 2017 in professional wrestling
- List of Ring of Honor pay-per-view events
