= ROH Bound By Honor =

2019 Ring of Honor event

Bound By Honor (2019)
- Promotion: Ring of Honor
- Date: Night 1: February 9, 2019 (TV); Night 2: February 10, 2019
- City: Night 1: Lakeland, Florida; Night 2: Coral Gables, Florida
- Venue: Night 1: RP Funding Arena; Night 2: Watsco Center
- Attendance: Night 1: 800; Night 2: 500

Pay-per-view chronology
← Previous; Road to G1 Supercard	Next → Honor Rising: Japan

Bound By Honor chronology
← Previous; 2018	Next → 2020

Bound By Honor (2019) was a two night, two city professional wrestling event produced by Ring of Honor (ROH), that took place on February 9, 2019 at RP Funding Arena in Lakeland, Florida (tapings for ROH's flagship program Ring of Honor Wrestling) and on February 10, 2019 at the Watsco Center in Coral Gables, Florida (live event).

== Production ==
Other on-screen personnel
Role	Name
Commentators	Caprice Coleman
Commentators	Nick Aldis

=== Storylines ===
Bound By Honor (2019) featured professional wrestling matches, involving different wrestlers from pre-existing scripted feuds, plots, and storylines that played out on ROH's television programs. Wrestlers portrayed villains or heroes as they followed a series of events that built tension and culminated in a wrestling match or series of matches.

== Results ==
=== Night 1 - Lakeland, FL (TV Tapings) ===
No.	Results	Stipulations
1^{D}	Vinny Pacifico defeated Beach Body Ryan	Singles match
2	Jeff Cobb (c) defeated Silas Young	Singles match for the ROH World Television Championship
3	Rush defeated Vinny Marseglia	Singles match
4	Jonathan Gresham defeated Matt Taven by disqualification	Singles match
5	Mayu Iwatani defeated Holidead	Singles match
6	Kenny King defeated Dalton Castle	Singles match
7	The Briscoes (Jay Briscoe and Mark Briscoe) and Shane Taylor defeated Shinobi Shadow Squad (Cheeseburger, Eli Isom and Ryan Nova)	Six-man tag team match
8	The Bouncers (Beer City Bruiser and Brian Milonas) defeated Joe Keys and Brian Johnston	Tag team match
9	Madison Rayne defeated Thunder Rosa	Singles match
10	Zack Sabre Jr. defeated Rocky Romero	Singles match
11	Kelly Klein (c) defeated Stella Grey	Singles match for the Women of Honor World Championship
12	Lifeblood (Juice Robinson, Tracy Williams and Bandido) defeated Dalton Castle and The Boys (Boy 1 and Boy 2)	Six-man tag team match
13	Willie Mack (c) defeated Rhett Titus	Singles match for the NWA National Heavyweight Championship
14	Jay Lethal and Jonathan Gresham defeated Coast To Coast (Shaheem Ali and LSG)	Tag team match
15	Villain Enterprises (Marty Scurll and PCO) defeated The Kingdom (T. K. O'Ryan and Vinny Marseglia)	Tag team match
(c) / – the champion(s) heading into the match; D / – this was a dark match

=== Night 2 - Coral Gables, FL ===
No.	Results	Stipulations	Times
1^{D}	Brian Johnson and Dante Caballero defeated Rayo and Vinny Pacifico	Tag team match	—
2	Jay Briscoe defeated Rhett Titus	Singles match	5:32
3	Shinobi Shadow Squad (Cheeseburger, Eli Isom and Ryan Nova) defeated Dalton Castle and The Boys (Boy 1 and Boy 2)	Six man tag team match	12:15
4	Zack Sabre Jr. defeated Colt Cabana	Singles match	13:07
5	Kenny King defeated Willie Mack, Marty Scurll and Silas Young	Four corner survival match	11:17
6	Jeff Cobb (c) defeated Rocky Romero	Singles match for the ROH World Television Championship	14:18
7	Mayu Iwatani defeated Kelly Klein (c)	Singles match for the Women of Honor World Championship	11:03
8	Lifeblood (Juice Robinson, David Finlay, Tracy Williams and Bandido) defeated Coast To Coast (LSG and Shaheem Ali) and The Bouncers (Beer City Bruiser and Brian Milonas)	Eight man tag team match	16:20
9	PCO defeated Mark Briscoe	Singles match	12:35
10	The Kingdom (Matt Taven, T. K. O'Ryan and Vinny Marseglia) defeated Jay Lethal, Jonathan Gresham and Rush	Six man tag team match	15:06
(c) / – the champion(s) heading into the match; D / – this was a dark match

== See also ==
- 2019 in professional wrestling
