= Glory By Honor XVII =

Professional wrestling event

- Promotion: Ring of Honor
- Date: October 12, 2019
- City: New Orleans, Louisiana
- Venue: UNO Lakefront Arena

Pay-per-view chronology
← Previous; Death Before Dishonor XVII	Next → Final Battle

Glory By Honor chronology
← Previous; XVI	Next → XVIII

Glory By Honor XVII was a professional wrestling livestreaming event produced by Ring of Honor (ROH), which took place on October 12, 2019 at the UNO Lakefront Arena in New Orleans, Louisiana and was streamed live on ROH's streaming service Honor Club.

== Storylines ==
Glory By Honor XVII will feature professional wrestling matches, involving different wrestlers from pre-existing scripted feuds, plots, and storylines that played out on ROH's television programs. Wrestlers portrayed villains or heroes as they followed a series of events that built tension and culminated in a wrestling match or series of matches.

== Results ==
No.	Results	Stipulations	Times
1	Silas Young won by last eliminating Josh Woods	15-man battle royal (Note: Order of elimination: Matt Lancie, Bu Ku Dao, Brian Johnson, Cheeseburger, Rhett Titus, Kenny King, Beer City Bruiser, LSG, Shaheem Ali, Big Daddy Yum Yum, Brawler Milonas, Josh Woods); Winner faced Rush for the ROH World Championship later in the night.	7:50
2	PCO defeated Dalton Castle	Semifinal match in the Final Battle ROH World Championship #1 contender tournament	12:30
3	Marty Scurll defeated Jay Lethal by submission	Semifinal match in the Final Battle ROH World Championship #1 contender tournament	11:30
4	Shane Taylor (c) defeated J. Spade	Singles match for the ROH World Television Championship	5:50
5	Kelly Klein defeated Angelina Love (c)	Singles match for the Women of Honor World Championship	12:00
6	The Briscoe Brothers (Jay Briscoe and Mark Briscoe) (c) defeated Luke Hawx and Perry Hawx	Tag team match for the ROH World Tag Team Championship	12:10
7	Jonathan Gresham defeated Alex Shelley	Singles match	14:30
8	LifeBlood (Mark Haskins and Tracy Williams) defeated Villain Enterprises (Brody King and Flip Gordon)	Tag team match	11:10
9	Rush (c) defeated Silas Young	Singles match for the ROH World Championship	10:25
10	PCO defeated Marty Scurll	Final Battle ROH World Championship #1 contender tournament final	14:50
(c) / – the champion(s) heading into the match

== See also ==
- 2019 in professional wrestling
- List of Ring of Honor pay-per-view events
