= Brandi Rhodes =

American professional wrestler (born 1983)

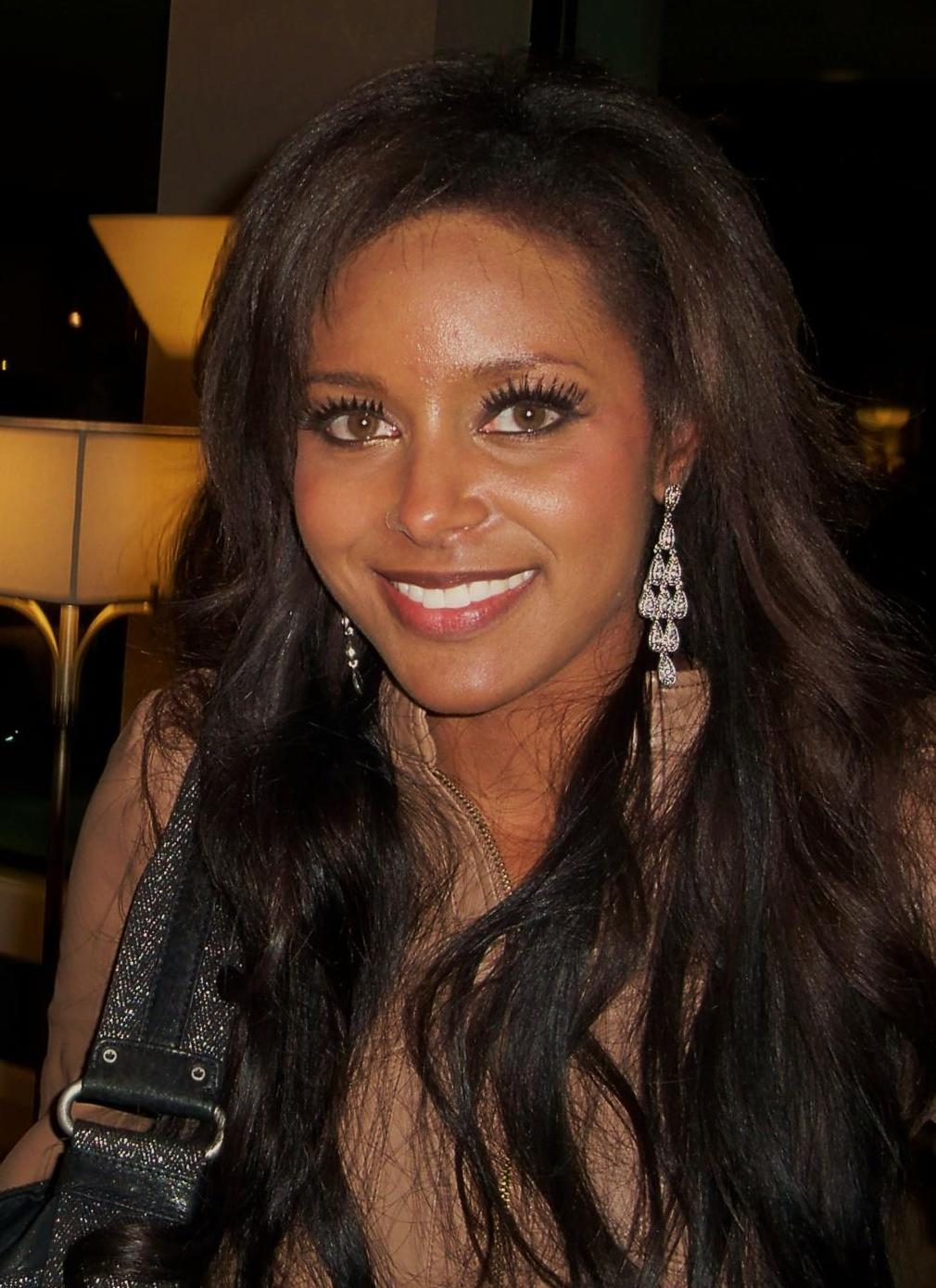
- Rhodes in 2011
- Born: Brandi Alexis Reed; June 23, 1983 (age 43); Canton, Michigan, U.S.
- Education: University of Michigan (BA); University of Miami (MA)
- Occupations: Professional wrestler, ring announcer
- Spouse: Cody Rhodes (m. 2013)
- Children: 2
- Family: Dusty Rhodes (father-in-law); Dustin Rhodes (half-brother-in-law)
- Professional wrestling career
- Ring name(s): Brandi; Brandi Rhodes; Eden; Eden Stiles
- Billed height: 5 ft 6 in (168 cm)
- Billed from: Ann Arbor, Michigan; Atlanta, Georgia; Canton, Michigan; Detroit, Michigan; Los Angeles, California; Marietta, Georgia
- Trained by: Norman Smiley; Sara Del Rey
- Debut: April 2011
- Retired: February 2022

Brandi Alexis Runnels (née Reed; born June 23, 1983), known professionally as Brandi Rhodes, is an American ring announcer and retired professional wrestler. She is best known for her tenure in WWE and as the former chief brand officer and executive vice president (EVP) of wrestling promotion All Elite Wrestling (AEW), where she also performed as a wrestler.

She began her career in WWE in 2011, where she was assigned to the farm territory Florida Championship Wrestling. She worked as a ring announcer under the name of Eden Stiles. During that time, she married Cody Rhodes. After her husband left WWE in 2016, she left a few days later. During the following years, she worked as a wrestler in several promotions, most notably Impact Wrestling, Ring of Honor, and World Wonder Ring Stardom. In 2019, she joined the newly created promotion All Elite Wrestling. She left AEW in February 2022, and later retired from professional wrestling.

She was also a cast member on the E! reality television series WAGS Atlanta. Prior to her wrestling career, she was a figure skater and a television news anchor.

== Early life ==
Brandi Alexis Reed was born and raised in Canton, Michigan, a suburb of Detroit, Michigan, and has an older brother named Jason Reed. She was a competitive figure skater for 17 years, beginning at the age of four. As a sophomore in college, Reed stopped ice skating competitively to focus on academics and a future broadcasting career. Reed graduated from the University of Michigan on a full scholarship. She worked as a local news reporter for two years before relocating to Miami, Florida, to pursue a career in modeling and acting. While living in Miami, Reed completed a master's degree in broadcast journalism from the University of Miami.

== Professional wrestling career ==
=== World Wrestling Entertainment/WWE (2011) ===
While working as a model after completing her master's degree, Reed was invited to a WWE tryout in 2011. She signed a developmental contract with WWE in March 2011 and was assigned to Florida Championship Wrestling (FCW). The following month, she debuted under the ring name Brandi, accompanying Lucky Cannon at an FCW house show. On May 12, she began working as a ring announcer on weekly episodes of Superstars. On July 11, Reed also began announcing duties on NXT, under the ring name Eden Stiles. She filled in as the ring announcer for SmackDown on the July 15 and November 11 episodes. Her only match took place on July 16 at FCW Summer SlamaRama, where she was involved in a battle royal, which was won by Sonia. In December, at her request, Reed was released from her WWE contract.

=== Return to WWE (2013–2016) ===
In November 2013, Reed announced on Twitter that she would be returning to WWE. Her ring name was shortened to Eden and resumed her role as a ring announcer, first appearing on NXT. In February 2014, Eden began a video blog, which ran until January 2015 and was published on the WWE website. In October 2014, Eden became the regular ring announcer and backstage interviewer for SmackDown and Main Event. In late 2014, Eden made her pay-per-view ring announcing debut at Hell in a Cell (2014), as well as becoming the backup ring announcer for Raw, while Lilian Garcia was recovering from surgery. On May 24, 2016, Rhodes was granted her release from WWE, just days after her husband Cody Rhodes also requested his release.

=== Independent circuit (2016–2019) ===
On June 3, 2016, it was announced that Rhodes would be in Cody Rhodes' corner in his match against Mike Bennett at "Wrestling Under the Stars" on August 26 in Pittsfield, Massachusetts. On October 10, it was announced that Rhodes will make her singles wrestling debut against Jordynne Grace at Pro Wrestling Magic, defeating her on October 15. On July 15, 2017, she defeated Tessa Blanchard at Northeast Wrestling. In 2018, she wrestled for United Kingdom promotion Fight Forever Wrestling and defeated Bea Priestley and Viper. Rhodes made a surprise appearance alongside Britt Baker and Nyla Rose at Rise Wrestling in 2019, coming to the aid of Kylie Rae, and setting up a match between the three at Double or Nothing.

=== Total Nonstop Action Wrestling/Impact Wrestling (2016–2017) ===
On September 16, 2016, it was reported by TMZ that Rhodes had signed with TNA. Three days later, TNA confirmed Rhodes' signing. At Bound for Glory, Rhodes, alongside her husband Cody, made her TNA debut as a face, attacking Maria and her husband Mike Bennett to begin a feud between the two couples. Brandi made her in ring debut on the October 28 episode of Impact Wrestling alongside her husband Cody against Maria and Mike Bennett in a mixed tag team match. On February 16, Brandi and Moose defeated Decay (Crazzy Steve and Rosemary) in a mixed tag team match. On February 23 Brandi's husband Cody returned, attacking Moose out of jealousy after finding out she had Moose's phone number. On April 6, Rhodes participated in a gauntlet match for being the number one contender to Rosemary's Knockouts Championship, which was won by ODB. Rhodes then parted ways with Impact Wrestling. Reportedly the promotion wanted a percentage from a non-wrestling related television appearance Rhodes had made, which led to her requesting her release.

=== Ring of Honor (2017–2018) ===
Rhodes made her Ring of Honor in-ring debut in the Women of Honor division at ROH's July 29, 2017, television tapings at the Cabarrus Arena in Concord, North Carolina. She teamed with Sumie Sakai to battle Jenny Rose and Mandy Leon. She had previously briefly appeared in ROH to introduce Cody for his match against Jay Lethal at the Final Battle PPV on December 2, 2016. In 2018 she entered the inaugural Women of Honor World Championship but lost to Tenille Dashwood in the quarterfinals.

=== World Wonder Ring Stardom (2018) ===
Prior to entering World Wonder Ring Stardom's 2018 Cinderella Tournament, it was announced that Rhodes would be joining the Oedo Tai stable. In the tournament, she defeated fellow stablemate Natsu Sumire in the first round, but lost to Io Shirai in the quarterfinals. Rhodes wrestled in three tag team matches alongside Oedo Tai stablemates, winning all three. It was later revealed that she had suffered a broken collarbone during this time.

=== All Elite Wrestling (2019–2022) ===
In 2019, Rhodes became Chief Brand Officer of All Elite Wrestling (AEW), a new wrestling promotion co-founded by her husband. At Double or Nothing, AEW's first pay-per-view, on May 25, 2019, Rhodes appeared during the women's triple threat match between Britt Baker, Nyla Rose, and Kylie Rae and announced that she was adding Awesome Kong to the match, which Baker won, establishing Rhodes as a heel. Rhodes made her AEW in-ring debut at Fight for the Fallen on July 13, defeating Allie due to interference from Kong. At All Out, she wrestled in the Casino Battle Royale and was eliminated by Baker and Allie. During the following months, Rhodes and Kong began cutting off and collecting women's hair. The Nightmare Collective later gained new members Mel and Luther. At Bash at the Beach, Mel and Kong were originally scheduled to face Kris Statlander and Hikaru Shida, however Kong was not medically cleared and Rhodes would replace her in a losing effort. The Nightmare Collective was badly received by fans and in February, Rhodes left the group and Kong was off TV to film GLOW.

During the following weeks, she accompanied her husband Cody to his matches, as well as the team of The Natural Nightmares Dustin Rhodes and QT Marshall. She also formed a tag team called The Nightmare Sisters with Allie. On the November 18, 2020, episode of AEW Dynamite, Jade Cargill, who interrupted Cody the previous week, attacked Brandi backstage, wrapped her arm in a chair and stomped on it while Vickie Guerrero and Nyla Rose prevented assistance. On the December 9, 2020, episode of Dynamite, Brandi confronted NBA legend Shaquille O'Neal during his interview with Tony Schiavone, Shaq claimed Cargill could give Brandi pointers, leading to her throwing a glass of water on him. She made sporadic appearances on AEW after the birth of her daughter, most recently as a tweener while verbal sparring with Dan Lambert, and getting into a physical altercation with Paige VanZant; however, before the storyline could be continued, she and Cody left AEW on February 15, 2022.

=== Sporadic appearances in WWE (2024–present) ===
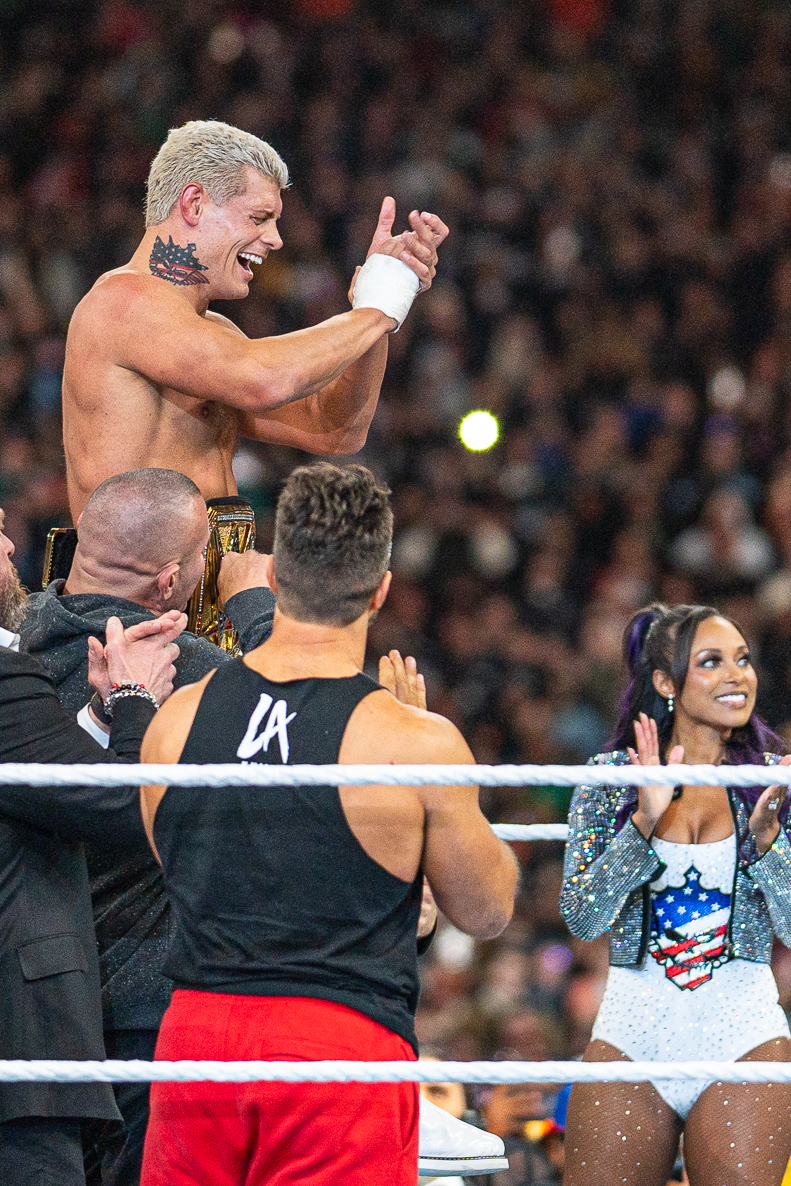
Brandi celebrating Cody Rhodes' title win at WrestleMania XL

At WrestleMania XL Night 2 on April 7, 2024, Brandi was part of Cody's entrance for his match against Roman Reigns for the Undisputed WWE Universal Championship. After Cody won, she went into the ring to celebrate with him.

== Other media ==
Rhodes has appeared in national advertisements for Budweiser and KFC, as well as Maxim. Rhodes has launched her own line of swimwear called "Confection Swimwear".

On November 2, 2017, Rhodes joined the cast of the E! television series WAGS Atlanta.

In 2015 at WrestleMania, Rhodes became the first African-American woman to be a ring announcer for a major American wrestling promotion. She then became the first woman of color to appear in a match at Wrestle Kingdom in 2018. As AEW's Chief Branding Officer, Rhodes became the first African-American woman to hold an executive position in a major North American wrestling promotion. With AEW, she secured a partnership with KultureCity, a nonprofit that makes large-scale events inclusive for people with sensory needs.

In 2021, she starred with her husband Cody Rhodes on the reality show Rhodes to the Top.

== Personal life ==
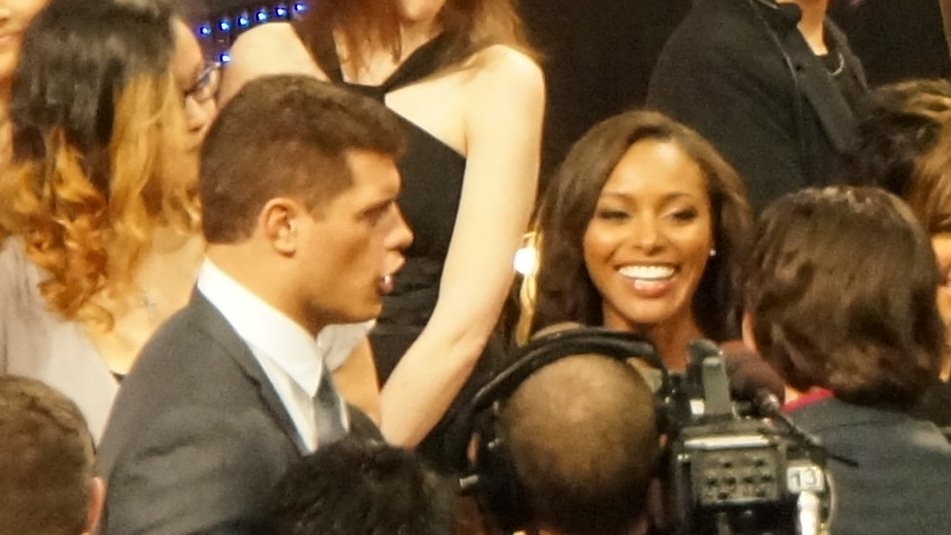
Rhodes with her husband Cody in April 2014

Reed married professional wrestler Cody Rhodes in September 2013. The couple have two children. Reed is also the cousin of professional wrestler Scorpio Sky.

== Championships and accomplishments ==
- DDT Pro-Wrestling
  - Ironman Heavymetalweight Championship (1 time)
- Pro Wrestling Illustrated
  - Ranked No. 50 of the top 100 female wrestlers in the PWI Women's 100 in 2019
