= Women of Honor World Championship =

American professional wrestling championship

- The Women of Honor World Championship belt

Details
- Promotion: Ring of Honor
- Date established: December 15, 2017
- Date retired: January 1, 2020 (replaced with the ROH Women's World Championship)

Other names
- Women of Honor Championship (2017–2018); Women of Honor World Championship (2018–2020)
Statistics
- First champion: Sumie Sakai
- Final champion: Kelly Klein
- Most reigns: Kelly Klein (3 reigns)
- Longest reign: Sumie Sakai (251 days)
- Shortest reign: Angelina Love (15 days)
- Oldest champion: Sumie Sakai (46 years, 4 months and 14 days)
- Youngest champion: Mayu Iwatani (25 years, 11 months and 22 days)
- Heaviest champion: Kelly Klein (162 lb (73 kg))
- Lightest champion: Mayu Iwatani (115 lb (52 kg))

The Women of Honor World Championship was a women's professional wrestling world championship created and promoted by the American promotion Ring of Honor (ROH). It was originally established as the Women of Honor Championship on December 15, 2017, and inaugural champion was Sumie Sakai. It was renamed as the Women of Honor World Championship in 2018, and then retired on January 1, 2020, with Kelly Klein as the final champion. The title was subsequently replaced by the ROH Women's World Championship.

== History ==
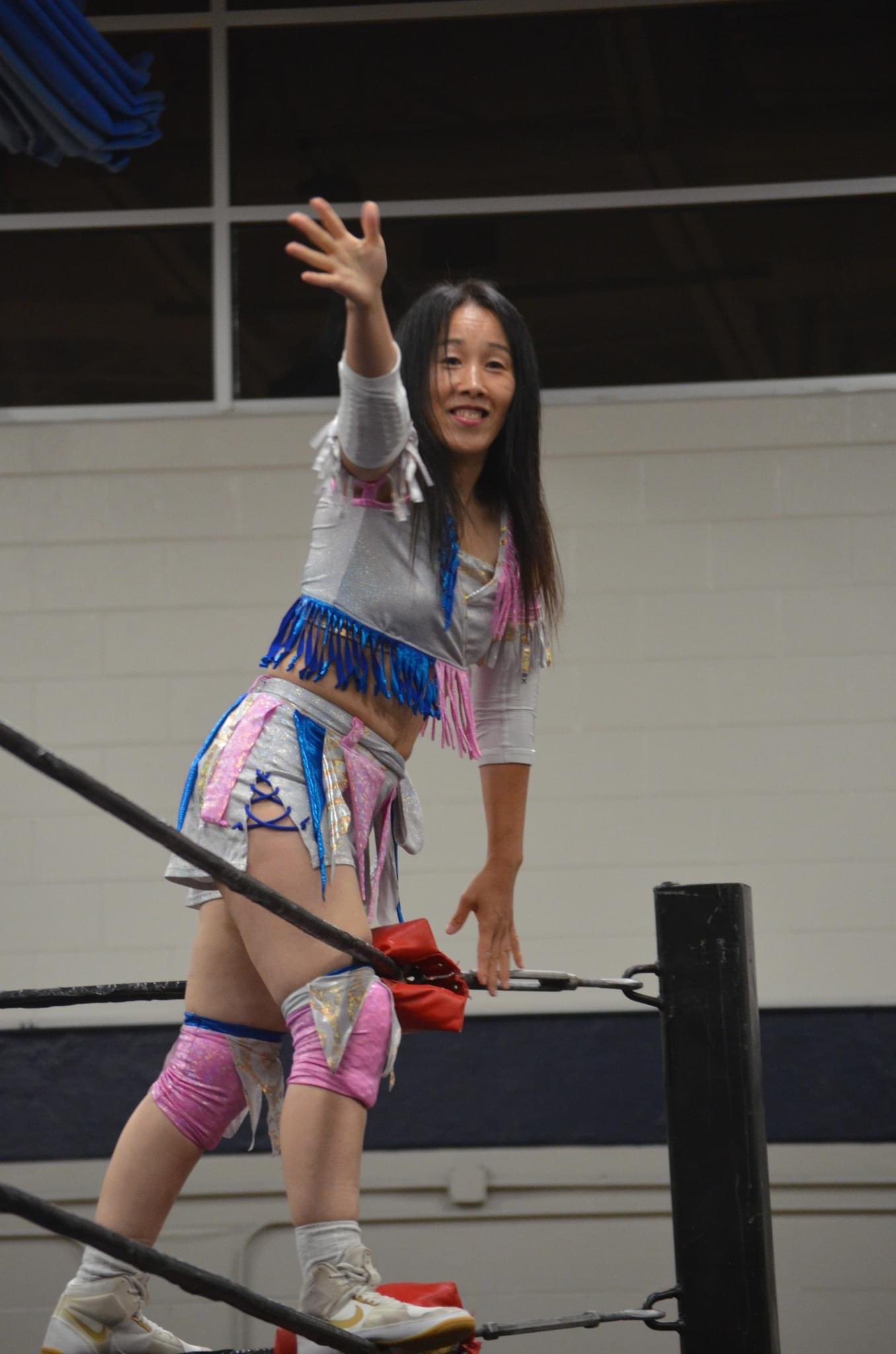
Inaugural and longest reigning champion, Sumie Sakai

At Final Battle, December 15, 2017, it was announced that a tournament to crown the first Women of Honor Championship holder would start on January 20, 2018. The tournament featured female ROH regulars, called the ROH Women of Honor and female wrestlers from then ROH partnered all Japanese female wrestling promotion from Japan World Wonder Ring Stardom (Stardom) as well.

On April 7, 2018, Sumie Sakai became the inaugural champion by defeating Kelly Klein in the 16-women tournament finals at Supercard of Honor XII in New Orleans, LA. During her reign, the title was renamed to Women of Honor World Championship at the Ring of Honor Wrestling tapings on August 25, 2018.

During Sakai's reign in 2018 the title was defended in the United Kingdom at ROH Honor United.

Also during year 2019 of this title's existence, the Women of Honor World Championship was defended in Japan at a Stardom event by Mayu Iwatani after she defeated Kelly Klein for the title at ROH pay-per-view Bound By Honor (during Klein's first reign and became champion for the first time in her career) in addition to ROH shows, pay-per-views, and events. On February 24, 2019 the Japanese stardom pay-per-view event took place and Mayu Iwatani was successful at retaining the title in her first title defense. Also on that night the match was the main event.

Kelly Klein became the first and only 2 & 3-time ROH Women of Honor Champion. During Kelly Klein's third reign, ROH producer Joey Mercury left the promotion. In a series of tweets, Mercury said ROH doesn't have a concussion protocol and Klein had to wrestle while injured. Klein agreed with Mercury and ROH let her go after her contract expired on December 31, 2019. Two months later, the creation of a new title was announced, the ROH Women's World Championship after the ROH Women of Honor World title was deactivated on January 1, 2020.

== Inaugural championship tournament (2017–2018) ==
=== Qualifying matches ===
Ring of Honor Wrestling tapings – January and February of 2018 (And probably in November & December of 2017 as well.) (2300 Arena – Philadelphia, Pennsylvania)

No.	Results	Stipulations
1	Jessie Brooks defeated Gabby Ortiz (5:45)	Women of Honor Championship Qualifying Match
2	Brandi Rhodes defeated Stella Grey (5:50)	Women of Honor Championship Qualifying Match

=== Tournament bracket ===
First Round; ROH Wrestling / Women of Honor tapings
Mandy Leon	Pin
Madison Rayne	7:30
Jessie Brooks	8:21
Kelly Klein	Pin
HZK	11:48
Mayu Iwatani	Pin
Deonna Purrazzo	Sub
Holidead	6:18
Jenny Rose	8:37
Kagetsu	Pin
Hana Kimura	8:00
Sumie Sakai	Pin
Stacy Shadows	9:14
Tenille Dashwood	Pin
Karen Q	7:28
Brandi Rhodes	Pin

Quarterfinals; ROH Wrestling / Women of Honor tapings
Mandy Leon	9:09
Kelly Klein	KO
Mayu Iwatani	Pin
Deonna Purrazzo	9:28
Kagetsu	7:36
Sumie Sakai	Pin
Tenille Dashwood	Pin
Brandi Rhodes	7:29

Semifinals; ROH Wrestling / Women of Honor tapings
Kelly Klein	Sub
Mayu Iwatani	9:00
Sumie Sakai	Pin
Tenille Dashwood	7:53

Final; Supercard of Honor XII; April 7, 2018
Kelly Klein	7:46
Sumie Sakai	Pin

== Belt design ==
The belt design has black leather with a pink & purple back design of the leather. A crown is outlined at the top of the center plate, with the logo WOH in the middle of the center plate. Under the logo, the words “Women of Honor” and “champion” are written in gold with a rectangular purple backing. The side plates include images of the western and eastern hemispheres of Earth.

== Reigns ==
Over the championship's one-year history, there have been six reign between four champions. Sumie Sakai was the inaugural champion, while Kelly Klein was the last. Klein held the record for most reigns at three. Sakai's reign is the longest at 251 days, while Angelina Love's reign is the shortest at 15 days. Sakai is the oldest champion at 46 years old, while Mayu Iwatani is the youngest at 25 years old.

=== Names ===
Name	Years
Women of Honor Championship	December 15, 2017 – August 25, 2018
Women of Honor World Championship	August 25, 2018 – January 1, 2020

Key
No.	Overall reign number
Reign	Reign number for the specific champion
Days	Number of days held

No.	Champion	Championship change			Reign statistics		Notes	Ref.
No.	Champion	Date	Event	Location	Reign	Days	Notes	Ref.
Ring of Honor (ROH)
1	Sumie Sakai	April 7, 2018	Supercard of Honor XII	New Orleans, LA	1	251	Defeated Kelly Klein in the finals of a 16-woman single-elimination tournament become the inaugural champion. During her reign, the title was also renamed to the Women of Honor World Championship.	
2	Kelly Klein	December 14, 2018	Final Battle	New York City, NY	1	58	This was a Four Corner Survival match, also involving Madison Rayne and Karen Q.	
3	Mayu Iwatani	February 10, 2019	Bound By Honor: Night 2	Coral Gables, FL	1	55		
4	Kelly Klein	April 6, 2019	G1 Supercard	New York City, NY	2	174		
5	Angelina Love	September 27, 2019	Death Before Dishonor XVII	Sunrise, NV	1	15		
6	Kelly Klein	October 12, 2019	Glory By Honor XVII	New Orleans, LA	3	81		
—	Deactivated	January 1, 2020	—	—	—	—	Kelly Klein was stripped of the championship after ROH did not renew her contract. The title was replaced with the ROH Women's World Championship.	

== Combined reigns ==
Rank	Wrestler	No. of reigns	Combined days
1	Kelly Klein	3	313
2	Sumie Sakai	1	251
3	Mayu Iwatani	1	55
4	Angelina Love	1	15

== See also ==
- World Women's Championship (disambiguation)
