= Kelly Klein =

Retired American professional wrestler (born 1986)

Personal information
- Born: January 28, 1986 (age 40) Cincinnati, Ohio, U.S.
- Spouses: Kyle Kraven (divorced); B. J. Whitmer (2019–2020)

Professional wrestling career
- Ring name(s): Kelly Klein; Mary Elizabeth Monroe
- Billed height: 5 ft 6 in (1.68 m)
- Billed weight: 162 lb (73 kg)
- Billed from: Cincinnati, Ohio
- Trained by: B. J. Whitmer; Jimmy Yang; Les Thatcher
- Debut: 2006
- Retired: 2019

Kelly Klein (born January 28, 1986) is an American former professional wrestler. She is best known for her time in Ring of Honor (ROH), where she was a record three-time and the final Women of Honor World Champion.

== Professional wrestling career ==
=== Ring of Honor (2015–2019) ===
Klein made her debut at Ring of Honor (ROH) on October 24, 2015, at Night 2 of the Glory By Honor XIV event in Dayton, Ohio, defeating Ray Lyn in one minute via submission.

Klein made her televised debut on the June 26, 2016, episode of Ring of Honor Wrestling, from Nashville, Tennessee. In the main event of the first ever episode of Women of Honor, she defeated Taeler Hendrix via submission. On the December 14, 2016, episode of Ring of Honor Wrestling, the second WOH special, she faced ODB in a winning effort when ODB passed out to Klein's submission.

As a heel, she went on an undefeated streak in ROH until it was ended by Karen Q with help from Deonna Purrazzo during an event in May 2017. This led to a triple threat match in July in the 3rd Women of Honor event, which Karen Q also ended up winning. Klein later defeated Purrazzo in another singles match on the July 29 tapings, with the win coming after Karen Q turned heel and attacked Purrazzo. In 2018 Kelly Klein entered the inaugural ROH Women of Honor Championship tournament but on April 7, 2018 at Supercard of Honor XII lost to Sumie Sakai in the finals.

==== ROH Women of Honor World Championship reigns (2018–2019) ====
At the 2018 Final Battle event, Klein won the Women of Honor World Championship (Note: Before Klein's first ROH title win the Women of Honor Championship name was changed to the Women of Honor World Championship.) for the first time, where she defeated the champion Sumie Sakai in a Four Corner Survival match, which also involved Madison Rayne and Karen Q. At Night 2 of Bound By Honor on February 10, 2019, she lost the title to Mayu Iwatani, ending her reign at 58 days. Klein regained the championship on April 6, 2019 at ROH's Madison Square Garden debut, the G1 Supercard, and shook hands with Iwatani afterwards, turning face in the process. Klein was attacked afterwards by the debuting Velvet Sky and Angelina Love, who were joined by Mandy Leon (The trio as The Allure.), with Leon turning heel by attacking Klein from behind.

On September 27, 2019 at Death Before Dishonor XVII Kelly Klein lost the ROH Women of Honor Championship to Angelina Love. On October 12, 2019 at Glory By Honor XVII Kelly Klein regained the ROH Women of Honor World Championship from Angelina Love. Making Klein the first & only women to hold the ROH Women of Honor World Championship 2 & 3 times.

==== Injury & ROH departure (2019) ====
On November 22, 2019, it was revealed that Klein would be let go by ROH whilst recovering from post-concussion syndrome and while still being the reigning Women of Honor World Champion. She previously spoke out against the company on Twitter for refusing to pay her a living wage and ROH not having a concussion protocol and not allowing her time off to heal from injury. It was these comments that reportedly led to ROH deciding not to renew her contract.

=== World Wonder Ring Stardom (2017–2018) ===
On October 14, 2017, Klein made her debut for the World Wonder Ring Stardom promotion by entering the Goddesses of Stardom Tag League tournament. She ended up winning the tournament along with Bea Priestley. Following the tournament, Klein and Bea unsuccessfully challenged Oedo Tai (Hana Kimura and Kagetsu) for the Goddesses of Stardom Championship.

In August and September 2018, Klein competed in the Blue Stars block of the 2018 5 Star Grand Prix, in which she scored a total of eight points.

== Championships and accomplishments ==
- Covey Promotions
  - CP Women's Championship (3 times)
- EMERGE Wrestling
  - EMERGE Women's Championship (1 time)
- Mega Championship Wrestling
  - MEGA Fighting Spirit Championship (1 time)
- Pro Wrestling Illustrated
  - Ranked No. 29 of the top 100 female singles wrestlers in the PWI Women's 100 in 2019
- Ring of Honor
  - Women of Honor World Championship (3 times, final)
- Vicious Outcast Wrestling
  - VOW Vixen's Championship (1 time)
- World Wonder Ring Stardom
  - Goddesses of Stardom Tag League (2017) – with Bea Priestley
