= Sumie Sakai =

Retired Japanese professional wrestler and mixed martial artist (born 1971)

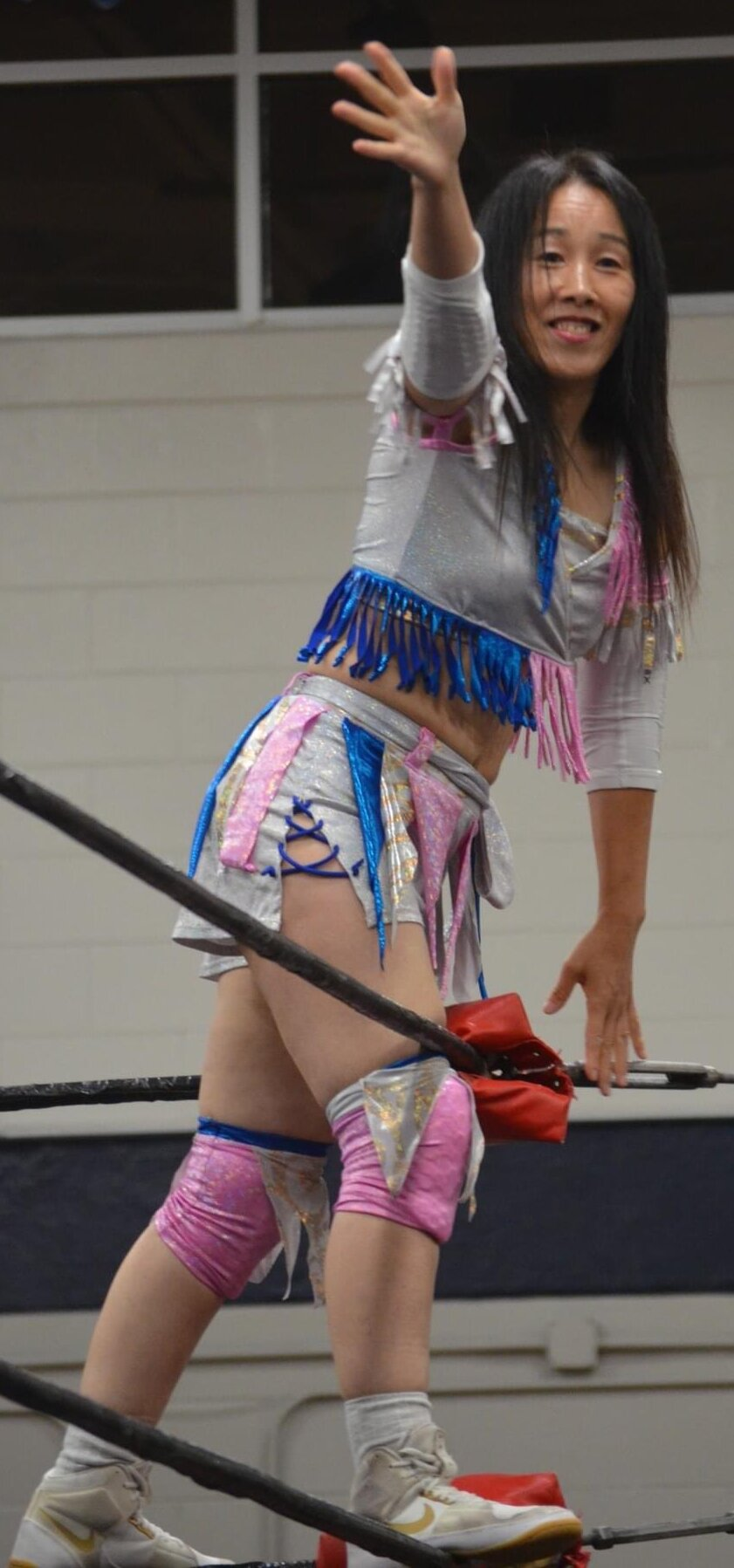
- Sakai in 2023

Personal information
- Born: November 24, 1971 (age 54) Suzuka, Mie, Japan

Professional wrestling career
- Ring name(s): Sumie Sakai; Yellow Michinoku Ranger
- Billed height: 1.55 m (5 ft 1 in)
- Billed weight: 54 kg (119 lb)
- Billed from: Osaka; Tokyo; Yokkaichi
- Trained by: Jaguar Yokota; Lioness Asuka; Cooga; Bison Kimura; Steve Bradley; Killer Kowalski; Slyck Wagner Brown; Bill Scott
- Debut: April 20, 1997
- Retired: January 11, 2025

Sumie Sakai (坂井 澄江, Sakai Sumie; born November 24, 1971) is a Japanese retired professional wrestler and former mixed martial artist. She is best known for her extensive tenure in Ring of Honor (ROH), where she was the inaugural and longest reigning Women of Honor Champion.

== Early life ==
As a young woman, Sakai practiced judo. From 1995 to 1997, she halted her practice of judo to work with senior citizens at the Kasugamachi Care Center in Kanazawa, Ishikawa.

== Professional wrestling career ==
=== Japan (1997–2005) ===
Sakai became involved in wrestling when her friend and fellow judo practitioner, Megumi Yabushita, invited her to join the wrestling sport. Sakai trained under Jaguar Yokota, and made her debut on April 20, 1997, with the Yoshimoto Ladies Pro Wrestling promotion, facing Yabushita at the Korakuen Hall in Tokyo. She went on to form a tag team with Yabushita named Yabusaka (ヤブサカ).

Later in 1997, Sakai began wrestling for Yokota's JDStar promotion, where she won both the JDStar Junior Championship and the JDStar Queen of the Ring Championship. She also won the Women's Championship of the affiliated American Wrestling Federation and the Tag Team Championship of the affiliated Trans-World Wrestling Federation. In 1999, she suffered a broken leg while wrestling Lioness Asuka. While rehabilitating, Sakai became enamored of American professional wrestling, and resolved to one day wrestle in the United States.

While in Japan, Sakai faced several prominent male Japanese wrestlers, including Dick Togo, The Great Sasuke and Jinsei Shinzaki. She furthered her training under Bison Kimura, Cooga and Lioness Asuka.

=== United States ===
==== Independent wrestling (2002–present) ====
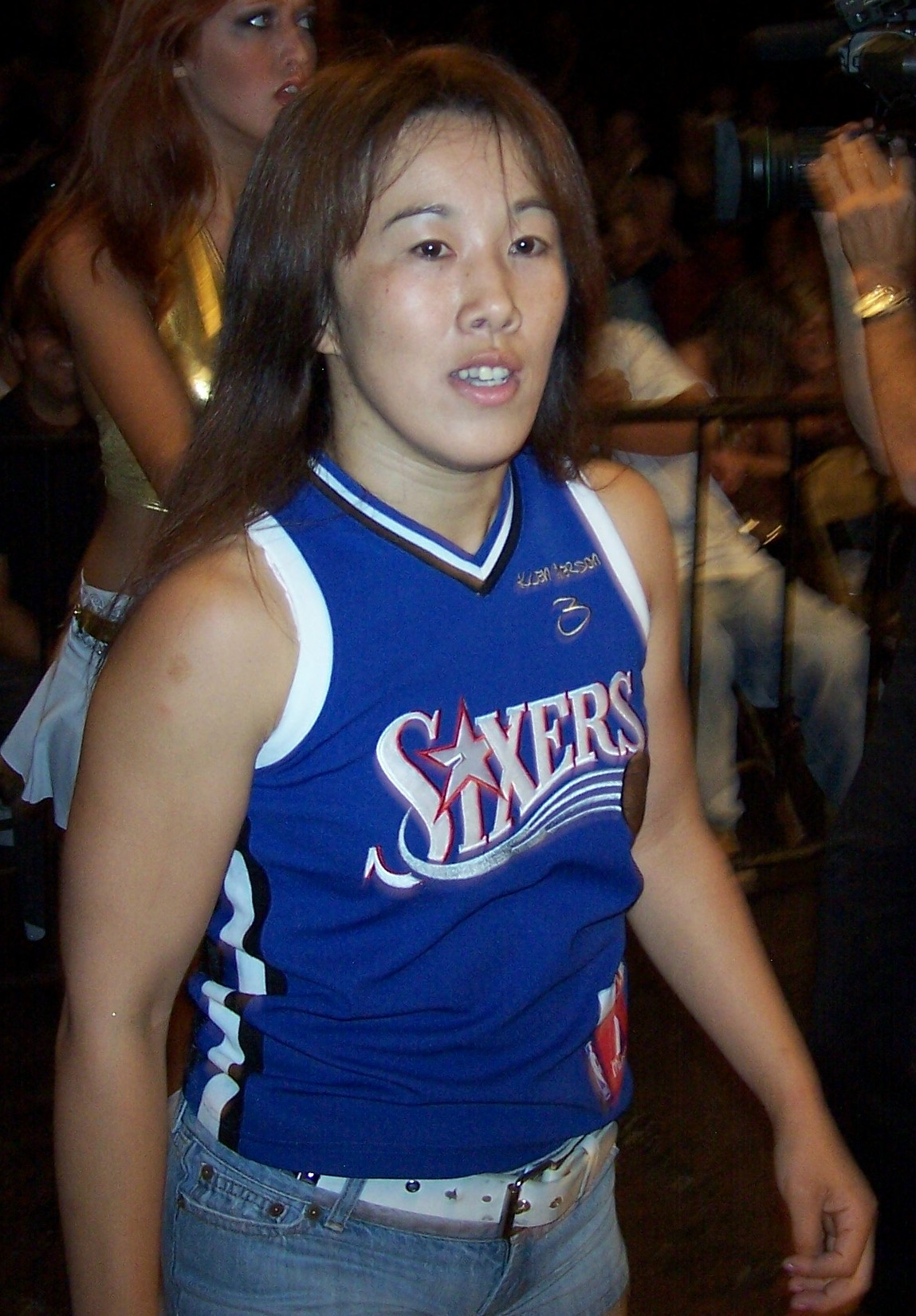
Sakai in August 2006

Sakai wrestled her first match in the United States in 2002. In May 2002, she began a three-month tour of the US, where she feuded with Mercedes Martinez in New England Championship Wrestling. While in the promotion, she and Martinez traded the New England Championship Wrestling North American Women's Championship, but Sakai was champion when she returned to Japan. In 2003, she left JDStar and relocated to the United States.

On April 17, 2005, Sakai organised "WE LOVE SABU", a pair of shows held at the Differ Ariake Arena in Tokyo. "WE LOVE SABU" was organised in support of Terry "Sabu" Brunk, an American wrestler who had been afflicted with a serious virus in the summer of 2004, with the proceeds of the show going towards paying Sabu's medical bills. The show featured Frontier Martial-Arts Wrestling alumni such as Masato Tanaka and Extreme Championship Wrestling alumni such as The Sandman. Sabu eventually made a complete recovery, returning to the ring on May 21, 2005.

In 2009, Sakai began training with Brazilian jiu-jitsu black belt Bill Scott. She currently holds a blue belt.

In 2012, Sakai joined Kurt Pellegrino's Mixed Martial Arts Academy in Belmar, NJ to better her BJJ and pursue her MMA career.

On August 9, 2019, Sakai defeated PCW Ultra Woman's Champion Tessa Blanchard for the title.

In January 2024, Sakai was named of the head trainer of Spark Joshi Puroresu of America's dojo.

=== Ring of Honor (2002–2005; 2014–2021) ===
==== Early appearances (2002–2005) ====
Sakai first appeared in Ring of Honor (ROH) in June 2002 and defeated Simply Luscious in the very first women's match on an ROH card. She returned in December 2003 and January 2004, defeating Allison Danger and losing to Alexis Laree and April Hunter. She returned to ROH on August 20, 2005, losing to Lacey at Do or Die 5.

==== Re-launched of Women of Honor division / Return to ROH (2014–2017) ====
Sakai returned to ROH in 2014 and been performing regularly for ROH since 2015 for its Women of Honor division. On September 26, 2015, Sakai faced Veda Scott in a losing effort as part of "Women of Honor Wednesday" program. Sakai made her televised debut on the June 26, 2016, episode of ROH TV, where Sakai alongside Mary Dobson and Thunderkitty faced the team of Allysin Kay, Amber Gallows and Scott in a losing effort. She also had plenty of other matches in the ROH Women of Honor division teaming with talent such as Mandy Leon, Deonna Purrazzo, Faye Jackson and facing talent such as Taeler Hendrix and others.

==== Women of Honor (World) Champion (2018) ====
Since 2018, Sakai took part in the tournament to crown the inaugural Women of Honor Champion, where she won in the first round (at ROH 16th Anniversary Show) against Hana Kimura. Sakai became the inaugural Women of Honor champion at Supercard of Honor XII after defeating Kelly Klein. During her reign, Sakai was able to retain her title against various competitors such as Madison Rayne and Tenille Dashwood. (Note: During Sakai's ROH title reign the Women of Honor Championship name was changed to the Women of Honor World Championship.) At Final Battle 2018 Sakai lost the championship to Klein in a Four Corner Survival match which also involved Karen Q and Rayne.

==== Various competitors and heel turn (2019–2020) ====
On January 26, 2019, she received her first Women of Honor World Championship match since losing the title, when she challenged Klein, but was unsuccessful. On January 11, 2020, at the Saturday Night at Center Stage, Sakai teamed with Nicole Savoy when they faced The Allure (Angelina Love and Mandy Leon) in a losing effort. After the match, Sakai attacked Savoy out of frustration, turning heel in the process. The following day, Sakai defeated Savoy in their second encounter against each other.

==== Return after COVID-19 pandemic (2021) ====
With ROH returning after the COVID-19 pandemic, Sakai made had her first match over a year on May 5, 2021, where she defeated Vita VonStarr, working as a face again. On July 7, Sakai received a "Ticket to Gold" to compete at a tournament to crown the inaugural ROH Women's World Champion. On July 30, Sakai lost to Rok-C at the first round of the tournament.

After her loss to Rok-C in the ROH Women's World title tournament and the company ROH being sold to Tony Khan she has not been seen in Ring of Honor.

=== Official retirement from professional wrestling (2025) ===
On December 14, 2024 it was announced that ROH female veteran / legend Sumie Sakai's retirement would take place at Battle in the Valley 2025. Her final match was on January 11, 2025 at Battle in the Valley.

== Mixed martial arts ==
Sumie Sakai
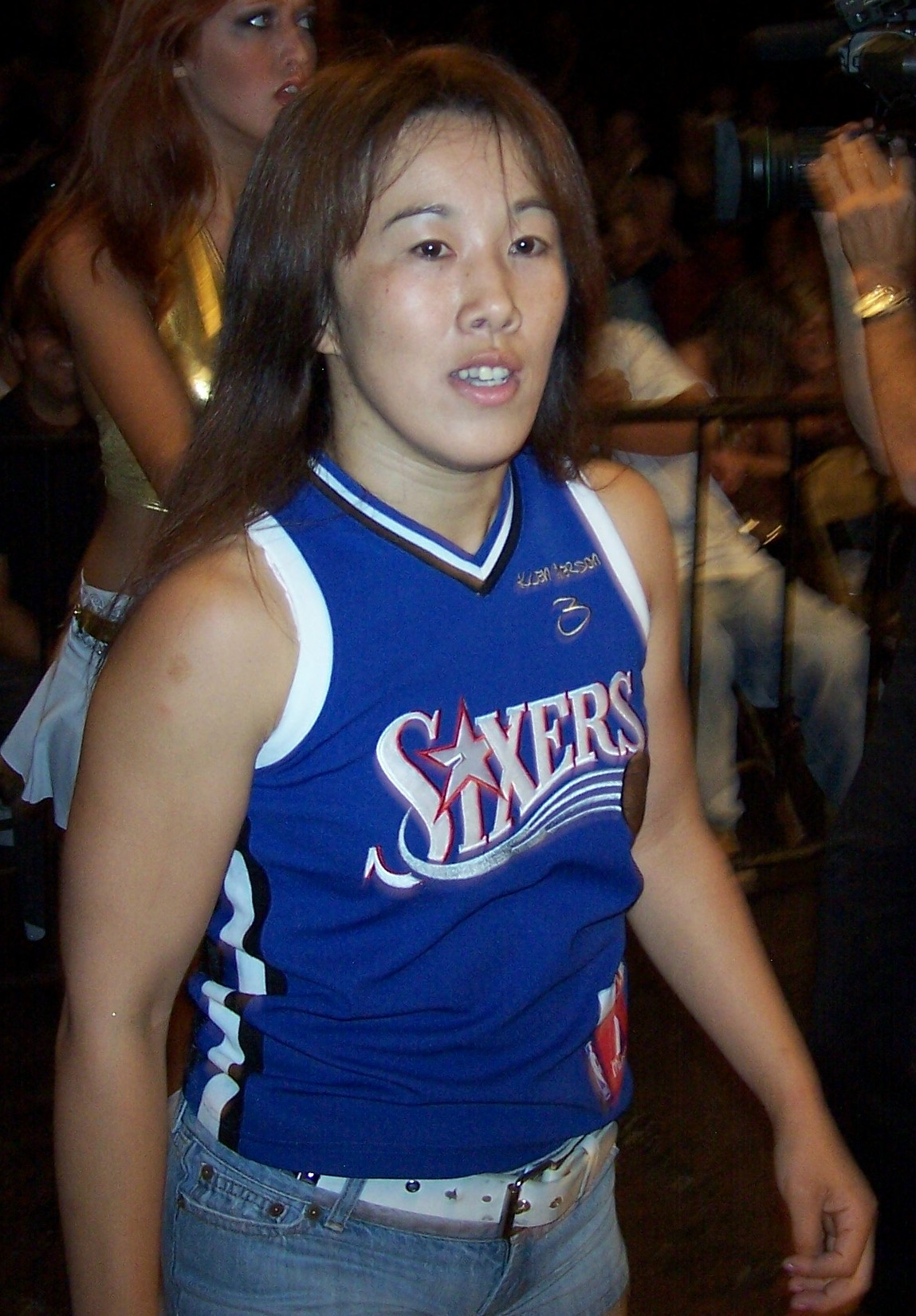
- Born: Suzuka, Mie, Japan
- Nationality: Japanese
- Height: 5 ft 1 in (1.55 m)
- Weight: 115 lb (52 kg)
- Division: Strawweight
- Years active: 2006–2013

Mixed martial arts record
- Total: 7
- Wins: 2
- By submission: 2
- Losses: 4
- By knockout: 2
- By submission: 1
- By decision: 1
- No contests: 1

Other information
- Mixed martial arts record from Sherdog

Sakai made her mixed martial arts debut on October 14, 2006, fighting American kickboxer Amy Davis in a bout promoted by Tom Supnet of the "Primal Tribe Fighting Club" as part of the Xtreme Fight Series II event. The bout ended in a no contest at the end of the first three-minute long round after Davis suffered an arm injury and was unable to continue as a result of an armbar applied by Sakai.

=== Mixed martial arts record ===
Professional record breakdown
7 matches	2 wins	4 losses
By knockout	0	2
By submission	2	1
By decision	0	1
By disqualification	0	0
Draws	0	
No contests	1	

Res.	Record	Opponent	Method	Event	Date	Round	Time	Location	Notes
Loss	2–4	Jamie Lowe	TKO (punches)	Cage Fury Fighting Championships 19	February 2, 2013	3	3:32	Atlantic City, New Jersey, United States	
Loss	2–3	Iman Achhal	TKO (punches)	Ultimate Warrior Challenge 7	October 3, 2009	2	2:30	Fairfax, Virginia, United States	
Loss	2–2	Jessica Penne	Submission (armbar)	Fatal Femmes Fighting 2	July 14, 2007	3	0:33	Compton, California, United States	
Win	2–1	Amber McCoy	Submission (rear-naked choke)	Brawl at Bourbon Street	May 25, 2007	1	0:18	Illinois, United States	
Loss	1–1	Jessica Aguilar	Decision (unanimous)	Combat Fighting Championship 3	February 17, 2007	3	5:00	Orlando, Florida, United States	
Win	1–0	Melissa Vasquez	Submission (armbar)	Freestyle Combat Challenge 25	January 13, 2007	1	N/A	Kenosha, Wisconsin, United States	
NC	0–0	Amy Davis	NC (confusion over rules)	Xtreme Fight Series 2	October 14, 2006	1	3:0	Boise, Idaho, United States	

== Championships and accomplishments ==
- All Japan Women's Pro-Wrestling
  - AJW Tag Team Championship (1 time) – with Yuko Kosugi
- American Wrestling Federation
  - AWF Women's Championship (2 times)
- DDT Pro-Wrestling
  - Ironman Heavymetalweight Championship (1 time)
- JDStar
  - JDStar Junior Championship (1 time)
  - JDStar Queen of the Ring Championship (1 time)
- New England Championship Wrestling
  - NECW North American Women's Championship (1 time)
- PCW Ultra
  - PCW Ultra Women's Championship (1 time)
- Pro Wrestling Illustrated
  - Ranked No. 12 of the top 50 female singles wrestlers in the PWI Female 50 in 2018
- Pro Wrestling Unplugged
  - PWU Women's Championship (1 time)
- Pro Wrestling World-1
  - Pro Wrestling World-1 Women's Championship (1 time)
- Ring of Honor
  - Women of Honor (World) Championship (1 time, inaugural)
  - Women of Honor Championship Tournament (2018)
  - ROH Year-End Award (1 time)
    - WOH Wrestler of the Year (2018)
- Spark Joshi Puroresu of America
  - Spark Joshi World Championship (1 time)
- Trans-World Wrestling Federation
  - TWWF Tag Team Championship (4 times) – with Cooga (1), Hiroyo Mutoh (1) and Megumi Yabushita (2)
- Vietnam Pro Wrestling
  - VPW Hall Of Fame (2023)
- Valkyrie Women's Professional Wrestling
  - International Joshi Grand Prix (2014)
- Women's Extreme Wrestling
  - WEW Tag Team Championship (1 time) – with Annie Social

== Notes ==
Specific

General

- Bobish, Seguin Win at XFS II
- Sumie Sakai at Bodyslamming.com
- Sumie Sakai at Cagematch.net
- Sumie Sakai at GloryWrestling.com
- Sumie Sakai at Puroresuya.com
- Sumie Sakai Debuts in America
- WE LOVE SABU 4/17/05 Shows
