= ROH 19th Anniversary Show =

2021 Ring of Honor pay-per-view

- Promotional poster featuring The Foundation and La Facción Ingobernable
- Promotion: Ring of Honor
- Date: March 26, 2021
- City: Baltimore, Maryland
- Venue: UMBC Event Center
- Attendance: 0 (behind closed doors) (Note: The event was held without a paying audience due to the COVID-19 pandemic in the United States.)

Pay-per-view chronology
← Previous; Final Battle	Next → Best in the World

ROH Anniversary Show chronology
← Previous; 18th Anniversary (cancelled)	Next → —

ROH 19th Anniversary was a professional wrestling event produced by American promotion Ring of Honor (ROH) that aired on Friday, March 26 on pay-per-view, and was taped sometime the previous week. It emanated from the UMBC Event Center in Baltimore, Maryland.

It was the 18th event in the ROH Anniversary Show chronology, which celebrates the anniversary of the promotion's founding in 2002. This was also the first Anniversary Show to take place since the 17th in 2019, as the 18th was canceled in March 2020 due to the COVID-19 pandemic.

Following a five-month pandemic-related hiatus, ROH resumed operations in August 2020, holding all TV tapings and pay-per-view events (without fans) from their home base at the UMBC Event Center.

== Production ==
Other on-screen personnel
Role:	Name:
Commentators	Ian Riccaboni (Pre-show+Main Show)
Commentators	Caprice Coleman (Pre-show+Main Show)
Commentators	Rocky Romero (Main Show)
Ring announcer	Bobby Cruise
Referees	Joe Mandak
Referees	Todd Sinclair
Interviewer	Quinn McKay

=== Background ===
The event will feature professional wrestling matches, which involve different wrestlers from pre-existing scripted feuds, plots, and storylines that play out on ROH's television programs. Wrestlers portray villains or heroes as they follow a series of events that build tension and culminate in a wrestling match or series of matches.

=== Storylines ===
At Final Battle, Rush successfully defended the ROH World Championship against Brody King after interference from his brother/ROH World Television Champion Dragon Lee and father La Bestia del Ring. After the match, The Foundation (Jay Lethal, Tracy Williams, Rhett Titus, and ROH Pure Champion Jonathan Gresham) came from backstage, admonishing the dirty tactics used by La Faccion Ingobernable. The Foundation, being instrumental in the return of Pure Rules matches and the Pure Title, have been looking to "purify" every division in ROH. And pure wrestling is something that counteracts LFI and their habit of causing mayhem. On a February 27 "Championship Edition" of Ring of Honor Wrestling, LFI's Lee and Kenny King defeat Lethal and Gresham in a Pure Rules tag team match to win the ROH World Tag Team Championship, after Lee used an illegal closed-fist punch to the face behind the referee's back. Lethal would later turn his attention back to singles competition, defeating Jay Briscoe, Matt Taven, and EC3 in a Four Corner Survival match the following week; granting Lethal a match with Rush for the ROH World Title at the 19th Anniversary Show.

Also in the Foundation's purification mission, several weeks ago, Williams submitted a request to the ROH Board of Directors to be moved from the Pure Rankings-which he and Titus compete in to the Television Rankings, despite his #1 place in the Pure division. Nevertheless, the board approved and Williams was placed in the Television ranks. After being victorious in a Three-way match on ROH's YouTube show Week by Week against Television contenders Bandido and LSG, Williams secured a shot at the ROH World Television Championship against Dragon Lee. Williams will also team with Titus for a chance to bring the ROH World Tag Team Titles back to The Foundation, as they face Lee and Kenny King at the event. However, Lee suffered a ruptured eardrum requiring surgery, leaving King to be the surrogate TV Champion and Bestia to team with King.

On October 19, EC3 would make his Ring of Honor debut, cutting a promo to ask the ROH roster if the company's "Honor Is Real" tagline is either just that or something more. His main target were The Briscoe Brothers (Mark and Jay Briscoe), with Jay being his sole focus. Diverting Jay's attention from the tag team division, the two men were scheduled for a Grudge match at Final Battle. However, EC3 tested positive for COVID-19, and Briscoe would end up losing to Shane Taylor at the event. On the February 20 edition of Ring of Honor Wrestling, the Briscoes lost a #1 contender's match to LFI (Lee and King) after interference from Flip Gordon. EC3, who has recently signed to ROH, returned to reveal that he paid Gordon to ruin the Briscoes' chance. Now seeing that honor is not real in a selection of ROH talent, EC3 once again challenged Jay to prove him wrong. During the ROH World Title #1 contender's Four-Corner Survival, EC3 and Jay Briscoe ended up on the outside and brawled all the way to the backstage area. On the March 9 edition of Week by Week, it was announced that EC3 and Jay Briscoe will finally have their Grudge match at the 19th Anniversary Show. On March 13, Mark got payback when he interfered in Gordon's match with Flamita, setting up a match between the two at the 19th Anniversary as well.

At Final Battle, Shane Taylor Promotions (Shane Taylor, Moses, and Kaun) were originally supposed to challenge ROH World Six-Man Tag Team Champions The MexiSquad (Bandido, Flamita, and Rey Horus). However, when Bandido and Flamita tested positive for COVID-19, Taylor was relegated to the aforementioned match with Jay Briscoe, and Horus would face Dalton Castle. Because MexiSquad hasn't defended the titles since they procured them from Villain Enterprises, the ROH Board of Directors wanted to strip MexiSquad of the title and award them to STP. Taylor refused, as he wanted to make his new signees champions the right way. On the February 20 episode of Ring of Honor Wrestling, STP finally had their shot at MexiSquad, leading to the trio winning the titles. On March 12, the ROH website reported that MexiSquad will have their rematch at the 19th Anniversary Hour One Pre-Show.

On the ROH Honor Club show The Experience, Matt Taven found his Kingdom teammates T. K. O'Ryan and Vinny Marseglia laid out backstage once again. Demanding that the culprit reveal themselves during an in-ring promo, a bright spotlight was shined in Taven's eyes. Marseglia then blindsided Taven from behind and carved into his forehead with an ax, revealing that he was the one behind the "attacks". On the December 19 2019 edition of Ring of Honor Wrestling, when O'Ryan would leave the company in order to nurse a long-standing leg injury, he also announced The Kingdom was now disbanded. Vinny, meanwhile, would go through a personality change that lived up to his "Horror King" moniker. Now going by Vincent, he would begin spewing about righteous virtues, which led to his new stable-The Righteous (with Bateman, Chuckles, and Vita VonStarr). This would lead to Taven and Vincent having a Grudge match at Final Battle, won by Vincent, who would also break Taven's ankle after the match. During ROH's break from wrestling during the COVID-19 pandemic, Vincent still continued his assault on Taven, even invading his home during Taven's ROHStrong podcast appearance. During a Best Of episode focusing on The Allure, a video package played about following "The Trend". After ROH returned to television after their COVID-19 hiatus, Taven returned as "The Trend" on October 10 and attacked Vincent. While Taven and Vincent didn't have their scheduled singles match the following week after a pre-match brawl, Taven would defeat Vincent's Righteous confidant Bateman on November 20. That night also featured the ROH return of Mike Bennett, who saved Taven from nearly being punctured with a bar room dart. The grudge between the Righteous and newly reunited OGK led to a match between the teams at Final Battle, won by The OGK. However, a post-match beatdown ended with the Righteous now breaking Bennett's ankle. Because of liability issues between the two parties, the ROH Board of Directors forbade Taven and Vincent from touching each other (later updated to not being together) at ROH-sanctioned events. However, Vincent found loopholes in this agreement and used them to his advantage, including getting The Beer City Bruiser to bottle Taven and DDT Bennett, and then having VonStarr distract Taven during the Four Corner Survival. The OGK would get payback when they broke Bateman's ankle in the same fashion as the Righteous, while Taven tried goading Vincent into one more match. When Taven and Vincent were set for a summit on the ROH YouTube channel, VonStarr showed up in Vincent's stead, saying Taven's "day of reckoning" will come March 15. On that day, Vincent would reveal the location for their match at 19th Anniversary: The Police Athletic League Hall of Fame, a venue known for hosting Top Rope Promotions events (the promotion Taven and Vincent came up in). ROH later announced that the match is unsanctioned.

On the January 22 episode of Ring of Honor Wrestling, Josh Woods submitted Dalton Castle in a Pure Rules match. Dalton had been on a losing streak for some time after ROH returned to television, and the loss to Woods only exacerbated it. With the potential of leaving ROH after another loss, Castle challenged Woods to a rematch on March 6. Castle won after feigning a serious back injury. After the match, Woods' tag team partner Silas Young came with an ultimatum for Woods: He can keep going as a singles competitor and chase for the Pure Championship, or 2 Guys 1 Tag can reunite and run through the tag team division. On the March 16 episode of Week By Week, Castle-Woods 3, this time a normal singles match, was signed for the 19th Anniversary, with Young in Woods' corner.

== Results ==
No.	Results	Stipulations	Times
1^{P}	Brian Johnson defeated Danhausen, Eli Isom and LSG	Four Corner Survival match	10:53
2^{P}	Shane Taylor Promotions (Shane Taylor, Kaun and Moses) (c) defeated MexiSquad (Bandido, Flamita, and Rey Horus)	Lucha Rules tag team match for the ROH World Six-Man Tag Team Championship	7:53
3	Tracy Williams defeated Kenny King	Singles match for the ROH World Television Championship; King wrestled in place of champion and LFI teammate Dragon Lee, who was injured.	7:16
4	Flip Gordon defeated Mark Briscoe	Singles match	7:48
5	Dalton Castle defeated Josh Woods (with Silas Young)	Singles match	10:19
6	Jay Briscoe defeated EC3	Grudge match	20:55
7	Bandido defeated Flamita and Rey Horus	Three-way match	10:47
8	Vincent vs. Matt Taven ended in a no contest	Unsanctioned match	13:40
9	Jonathan Gresham (c) defeated Dak Draper	Pure wrestling rules match for the ROH Pure Championship	20:29
10	The Foundation (Rhett Titus and Tracy Williams) defeated La Faccion Ingobernable (La Bestia del Ring and Kenny King) (with Amy Rose) (c)	Tag team match for the ROH World Tag Team Championship; La Bestia Del Ring substituted for recognized champion, LFI teammate, and son Dragon Lee, who was injured.	10:29
11	Rush (c) defeated Jay Lethal	Singles match for the ROH World Championship	18:31
(c) / – the champion(s) heading into the match; P / – the match was broadcast on the pre-show

== Aftermath ==
During the event, Maria Kanellis-Bennett announced a tournament to crown a new ROH Women's World Champion, the first since the retirement of the Women of Honor World Championship at the beginning of 2020. The tournament will take place in the summer of 2021.

During Matt Taven and Vincent's Unsanctioned match, while the two traded shots on a terrace railing, a man appeared from nowhere and blindsided both men, sending the rivals crashing into tables. Said mystery man later carried Vincent out of the PAL Hall of Fame, rendering the match a no contest. He was later revealed as the newest member of the Righteous: Dutch

Plus, after the main event where Rush retained the World Championship, Brody King appeared to attack La Faccion Ingobernable alongside new teammates Homicide, Chris Dickinson, and Tony Deppen, thus forming a new group in ROH known as Violence Unlimited.
