= ROH 18th Anniversary Show =

2020 Ring of Honor pay-per-view

- Promotion: Ring of Honor
- Date: March 13, 2020 (PPV); March 14, 2020 (ROH: Past vs. Present); Both events were canceled
- City: Sunrise Manor, Nevada
- Venue: Sam's Town Live

Event chronology
← Previous; Gateway to Honor	Next → Supercard of Honor XIV (canceled)

ROH Anniversary Show chronology
← Previous; 17th Anniversary	Next → 19th Anniversary

ROH 18th Anniversary was a scheduled two-night professional wrestling event produced by American promotion Ring of Honor (ROH) that would have taken place on Friday, March 13 and Saturday March 14, 2020, at the Sam's Town Live in the Las Vegas suburb of Sunrise Manor, Nevada. Friday's show was planned to be a pay-per-view broadcast, while Saturday's show was planned to broadcast live on Honor Club. The event was canceled due to the COVID-19 pandemic.

== Announced matches at the time of cancellation ==
=== Night 1 – PPV ===
No.	Matches*	Stipulations
1	Rush (c) vs. Mark Haskins	Singles match for the ROH World Championship
2	Dragon Lee (c) vs. Bandido	Singles match for the ROH World Television Championship
3	Jay Lethal and Jonathan Gresham (c) vs. Villain Enterprises (Marty Scurll and Flip Gordon)	Tag team match for the ROH World Tag Team Championship
4	The Briscoe Brothers (Jay Briscoe and Mark Briscoe) vs. Dalton Castle and Joe Hendry	Tag team match
5	Shane Taylor vs. Dan Maff vs Kenny King vs. Bateman	Dealer's Choice Four Corner Survival match The winner gets a title shot of his choosing.
6	Jeff Cobb vs. Slex	Singles match
7	Session Moth Martina vs. Nicole Savoy	Singles match
8	Villain Enterprises (PCO and Brody King) vs Alex Zayne and Rey Horus	Tag team match
9	Bully Ray vs Eli Isom	Singles match
(c) / – the champion(s) heading into the match; *Card subject to change

=== Night 2 – ROH: Past vs. Present ===
No.	Matches*	Stipulations
1	Jay Briscoe vs. Mark Briscoe	Singles match
2	Jay Lethal vs. Xavier	Singles match
3	Generation Next (Matt Sydal and Alex Shelley) vs. Villain Enterprises (Marty Scurll and Flip Gordon)	Tag team match
4	Homicide vs. Brody King	Singles match
5	The Havana Pitbulls (Rocky Romero and Ricky Reyes) vs. MexiSquad (Bandido and Rey Horus)	Tag team match
6	R. J. Brewer vs. Mark Haskins	Singles match
7	Doug Williams vs. Jonathan Gresham	Singles match
8	Delirious and Grizzly Redwood vs. Dalton Castle and Joe Hendry	Tag team match
9	Sumie Sakai vs. Nicole Savoy	Singles match
*Card subject to change

== See also ==
- 2020 in professional wrestling
