= Honor Club =

OTT streaming service owned by professional wrestling promotion Ring of Honor

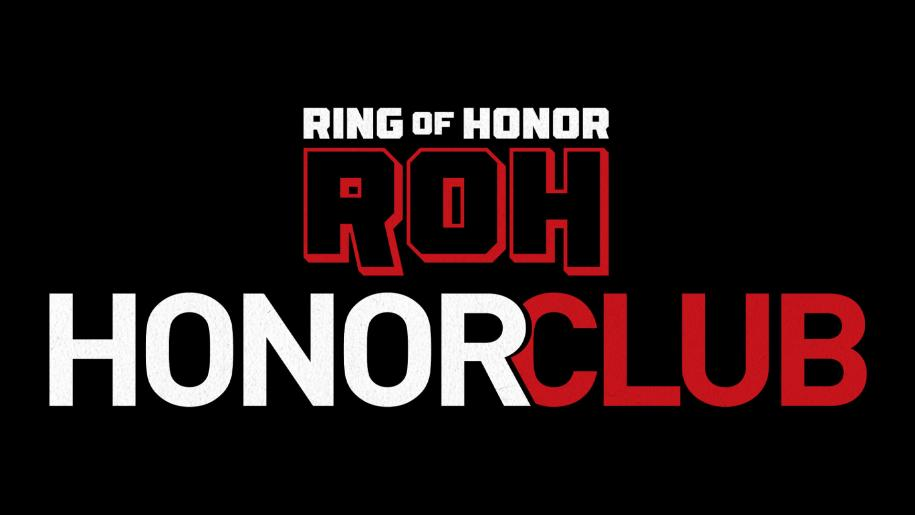
- Broadcast area: Worldwide
- Headquarters: Jacksonville, Florida, United States

Programming
- Language: English
- Picture format: HDTV (1080i 16:9)

Ownership
- Owner: Ring of Honor

History
- Launched: February 19, 2018

Links
- Website: www.watchroh.com

Honor Club is an OTT streaming service owned by professional wrestling promotion Ring of Honor (ROH). Development of a VOD service was announced on November 9, 2017, by ROH COO Joe Koff. Honor Club was formally announced on February 2, 2018 and the service officially launched on February 19, 2018. Initially, Honor Club operated similarly to WWE Network and Total Nonstop Action Wrestling's TNA+, in that pay-per-view events were available to stream through the service.

When it began, Honor Club had a tiered pricing model that also offered discounts on merchandise and advances on ticket sales. The service had two tiers, both of which contained special discounts as well as access to the ROH TV archive. The basic tier, which included a 50% discount on pay-per-views, was available for a monthly subscription price of $9.99 or one annual payment of $99.99. The VIP subscription cost $119.99 annually and provided live-streaming access to all future pay-per-view events and access to the ROH PPV archive with no additional costs.

On December 11, 2022, after ROH was acquired by All Elite Wrestling CEO Tony Khan, Honor Club was relaunched without any tiers, with membership costing $9.99 a month for all subscribers. Initially, pay-per-view events were no longer streamed on the relaunched service, but rather made available to watch on demand for subscribers 90 days after the events aired on Bleacher Report. However, beginning with Final Battle in December 2023, all ROH events were streamed live on Honor Club at no additional charge to subscribers. On January 18, 2023, a special event would be taped for Honor Club, serving as a tribute show for Jay Briscoe. Starting on March 2, 2023, ROH resumed airing its weekly series Ring of Honor Wrestling on Honor Club.

Honor Club is available online, through smart TVs and set-top boxes such as Roku and Apple TV, as well as via mobile apps.

== Programming ==
=== Current ===
- All episodes of Ring of Honor Wrestling from September 2011 onwards
- All pay-per-view events (on-demand viewing)
- All Honor Club exclusive events

=== Archive ===
- All Live On Tour events
- Select non-pay-per-view events from 2002 to 2021
- Select non-ROH events
  - All In
  - CMLL 85th Anniversary Show
  - CMLL International Gran Prix 2018
  - CMLL 86th Anniversary Show

== Past Honor Club special events ==
=== 2018 ===
#	Date	Event	Venue	Location	Main event
1	March 3	Manhattan Mayhem	Hammerstein Ballroom	New York, New York	Bullet Club (Adam Page, Marty Scurll, Matt Jackson, and Nick Jackson) vs. Shane Taylor and The Kingdom (Matt Taven, T. K. O'Ryan, and Vinny Marseglia) in an Ultimate Mayhem eight-man tag team match
2	April 15	Masters of the Craft	Express Live!	Columbus, Ohio	Dalton Castle vs. Marty Scurll vs. Punishment Martinez vs. Beer City Bruiser in a Defy or Deny match
3	April 27	Bound By Honor: Night 1	Palm Beach County Convention Center	West Palm Beach, Florida	Briscoe Brothers (Jay Briscoe and Mark Briscoe) (c) vs. Motor City Machine Guns (Alex Shelley and Chris Sabin) for the ROH World Tag Team Championship
4	April 28	Bound By Honor: Champions vs. Bullet Club	RP Funding Center	Lakeland, Florida	Bullet Club (Cody, Marty Scurll, Matt Jackson, and Nick Jackson) vs. Dalton Castle, Silas Young, and Briscoe Brothers (Jay Briscoe and Mark Briscoe) in an eight-man elimination tag team match
5	May 9	War of the Worlds	Lowell Memorial Auditorium	Lowell, Massachusetts	The Young Bucks (Matt Jackson and Nick Jackson) vs. Los Ingobernables de Japon (Bushi and Hiromu Takahashi)
6	May 11	War of the Worlds	Ted Reeve Community Arena	Toronto, Ontario, Canada	Jay Lethal, Kenny King, and Colt Cabana vs. Los Ingobernables de Japon (Evil, Hiromu Takahashi, and Sanada)
7	May 12	War of the Worlds	Royal Oak Music Theatre	Royal Oak, Michigan	Briscoe Brothers (Jay Briscoe and Mark Briscoe) (c) vs. Los Ingobernables de Japon (Tetsuya Naito and Bushi) for the ROH World Tag Team Championship
8	May 24	Honor United: Edinburgh	Edinburgh Corn Exchange	Edinburgh, Scotland	Briscoe Brothers (Jay Briscoe and Mark Briscoe) (c) vs. Bullet Club (Cody and Marty Scurll) for the ROH World Tag Team Championship
9	May 26	Honor United: London	Crystal Palace National Sports Centre	London, England	The Kingdom (Matt Taven, T. K. O'Ryan, and Vinny Marseglia) (c) vs. Bullet Club (Adam Page, Matt Jackson, and Nick Jackson) vs. SoCal Uncensored (Christopher Daniels, Frankie Kazarian, and Scorpio Sky) in a three-way match for the ROH World Six-Man Tag Team Championship
10	May 27	Honor United: Doncaster	Dome Leisure Centre	Doncaster, South Yorkshire, England	Los Ingobernables de Japon (Evil and Sanada) vs. Briscoe Brothers (Jay Briscoe and Mark Briscoe) vs. The Kingdom (T. K. O'Ryan and Vinny Marseglia) vs. The Young Bucks (Matt Jackson and Nick Jackson) in a Four Corner Survival match
11	June 15	State of the Art	Aztec Theatre	San Antonio, Texas	Bullet Club (Adam Page, Marty Scurll, Matt Jackson, and Nick Jackson) vs. Killer Elite Squad (Davey Boy Smith Jr. and Lance Archer) and The Kingdom (Matt Taven and Vinny Marseglia)
12	June 16	State of the Art	Gilley's Dallas	Dallas, Texas	Silas Young (c) vs. Punishment Martinez for the ROH World Television Championship
13	July 20	Honor for All	Nashville Municipal Auditorium	Nashville, Tennessee	The Addiction (Christopher Daniels and Frankie Kazarian) vs. Briscoe Brothers (Jay Briscoe and Mark Briscoe) vs. The Young Bucks (Matt Jackson and Nick Jackson)
14	August 16	Honor Re-United: Edinburgh	Edinburgh Corn Exchange	Edinburgh, Scotland	Bullet Club (Marty Scurll, Matt Jackson, and Nick Jackson) vs. Punishment Martinez and Briscoe Brothers (Jay Briscoe and Mark Briscoe)
15	August 18	Honor Re-United: Doncaster	Dome Leisure Centre	Doncaster, South Yorkshire, England	Adam Page vs. Mark Haskins in the ROH International Cup finals
16	August 19	Honor Re-United: London	Crystal Palace National Sports Centre	London, England	Jay Lethal (c) vs. Mark Haskins for the ROH World Championship
17	October 12	Glory By Honor XVI	Chesapeake Employers Insurance Arena	Baltimore, Maryland	Jay Lethal (c) vs. Silas Young for the ROH World Championship
18	November 4	Survival of the Fittest	Express Live!	Columbus, Ohio	Christopher Daniels vs. Guerrero Maya Jr. vs. Adam Page vs. Jonathan Gresham vs. Marty Scurll vs. P. J. Black in the Survival of the Fittest final for a future ROH World Championship opportunity
19	November 7	Global Wars	The Colisée	Lewiston, Maine	Jay Lethal, Jonathan Gresham, Chris Sabin, and Kushida vs. Los Ingobernables de Japon (Tetsuya Naito, Evil, Sanada, and Bushi)
20	November 8	Global Wars	Express Live!	Columbus, Ohio	Chris Sabin and Kushida vs. Jay Lethal and Jonathan Gresham vs. The Kingdom (T. K. O'Ryan and Vinny Marseglia) vs. The Young Bucks (Matt Jackson and Nick Jackson) in a Four Corner Survival match
21	November 9	Global Wars	Buffalo RiverWorks	Buffalo, New York	Best Friends (Beretta and Chuckie T) vs. Briscoe Brothers (Jay Briscoe and Mark Briscoe) vs. The Elite (Cody and Adam Page)
22	November 11	Global Wars	Maple Leaf Gardens	Toronto, Ontario, Canada	Jay Lethal (c) vs. Kenny King for the ROH World Championship

=== 2019 ===
#	Date	Event	Venue	Location	Main event
22	January 13	Honor Reigns Supreme	Cabarrus Arena	Concord, North Carolina	Jay Lethal (c) vs. Dalton Castle for the ROH World Championship
23	January 24	Road To G1 Supercard	Gilley's Dallas	Dallas, Texas	Jay Lethal and Jonathan Gresham vs. Lifeblood (Mark Haskins and Tracy Williams) in a Tag Wars first round match
24	January 25	Road To G1 Supercard	NRG Arena	Houston, Texas	Bully Ray, Shane Taylor, Silas Young, and Briscoe Brothers (Jay Briscoe and Mark Briscoe) vs. Lifeblood (Bandido, David Finlay, Juice Robinson, Mark Haskins, and Tracy Williams)
25	January 26	Road To G1 Supercard	Austin Highway Event Center	San Antonio, Texas	Lifeblood (Mark Haskins and Tracy Williams) vs. Villain Enterprises (Brody King and PCO) in the Tag Wars finals
26	March 31	Road To G1 Supercard	Chesapeake Employers Insurance Arena	Baltimore, Maryland	Jay Lethal and Jeff Cobb vs. Lifeblood (Bandido and Juice Robinson) vs. The Kingdom (T. K. O'Ryan and Vinny Marseglia)
27	February 10	Bound By Honor: Night 2	Watsco Center	Coral Gables, Florida	Jay Lethal, Jonathan Gresham, and Rush vs. The Kingdom (Matt Taven, T. K. O'Ryan, and Vinny Marseglia)
28	April 14	Masters of the Craft	Express Live!	Columbus, Ohio	Villain Enterprises (Marty Scurll, Brody King and PCO) (c) vs. The Kingdom (Matt Taven, T. K. O'Ryan, and Vinny Marseglia) in a street fight for the ROH World Six-Man Tag Team Championship
29	May 8	War of the Worlds	Buffalo RiverWorks	Buffalo, New York	Bandido vs. Flip Gordon
30	May 9	War of the Worlds	Ted Reeve Community Arena	Toronto, Ontario, Canada	Matt Taven (c) vs. PCO for the ROH World Championship
31	May 11	War of the Worlds	DeltaPlex Arena	Grand Rapids, Michigan	Bully Ray, Shane Taylor, Silas Young, and Briscoe Brothers (Jay Briscoe and Mark Briscoe) vs. Jay Lethal, Hirooki Goto, Yuji Nagata, Jeff Cobb, and Satoshi Kojima
32	June 1	State of the Art	accesso ShoWare Center	Kent, Washington	Matt Taven (c) vs. Tracy Williams for the ROH World Championship
33	June 2	State of the Art	Viking Pavilion	Portland, Oregon	Matt Taven vs. Flip Gordon vs Mark Haskins vs. PCO in a Defy or Deny match
34	July 21	Mass Hysteria	Lowell Memorial Auditorium	Lowell, Massachusetts	Alex Shelley, Jay Lethal, and Jonathan Gresham vs. The Kingdom (Matt Taven, T. K. O'Ryan, and Vinny Marseglia)
35	August 24	Saturday Night at Center Stage	Center Stage	Atlanta, Georgia	Jay Lethal, Jeff Cobb, Kenny King, and Rush vs. Matt Taven, Shane Taylor, and Briscoe Brothers (Jay Briscoe and Mark Briscoe) in an eight-man elimination tag team match
36	August 25	Honor for All	Nashville Fairgrounds	Nashville, Tennessee	Matt Taven vs. Jay Lethal vs. Jeff Cobb vs. Kenny King in a Defy or Deny match
37	September 6	Global Wars Espectacular	Ford Community & Performing Arts Center	Dearborn, Michigan	Bandido vs. Jay Briscoe
38	September 7	Global Wars Espectacular	Odeum Expo Center	Villa Park, Illinois	Lifeblood (Bandido, Mark Haskins, and Tracy Williams) vs. Villain Enterprises (Flip Gordon, Brody King, and PCO)
39	September 8	Global Wars Espectacular	Potawatomi Hotel Casino	Milwaukee, Wisconsin	Rush and Jeff Cobb vs. The Kingdom (Matt Taven and Vinny Marseglia)
40	October 12	Glory By Honor XVII	Lakefront Arena	New Orleans, Louisiana	Marty Scurll vs. PCO in the ROH World Championship #1 contender's tournament finals
41	October 25	Honor United: London	York Hall	London, England	Rush and Jeff Cobb vs. Villain Enterprises (Flip Gordon and Marty Scurll)
42	October 26	Honor United: Newport	Newport Centre	Newport, Gwent, Wales	Colt Cabana and PCO vs. Rush and Jeff Cobb
43	October 27	Honor United: Bolton	Bolton White Hotel	Bolton, Greater Manchester, England	Rush (c) vs. Jeff Cobb for the ROH World Championship
44	November 2	The Experience	Stage AE	Pittsburgh, Pennsylvania	Dan Maff and Villain Enterprises (Marty Scurll and PCO) (c) vs. Cheeseburger, Colt Cabana, and Jeff Cobb for the ROH World Six-Man Tag Team Championship
45	November 3	Unauthorized	Express Live!	Columbus, Ohio	Dan Maff vs. PCO in an unsanctioned match

=== 2020 ===
#	Date	Event	Venue	Location	Main event
46	January 11	Saturday Night at Center Stage	Center Stage	Atlanta, Georgia	PCO (c) vs. Rush for the ROH World Championship
46	January 12	Honor Reigns Supreme	Cabarrus Arena	Concord, North Carolina	La Facción Ingobernable (Rush, Kenny King, and Dragon Lee) vs. Villain Enterprises (Marty Scurll, Brody King, and PCO)
48	February 9	Free Enterprise	Chesapeake Employers Insurance Arena	Baltimore, Maryland	Nick Aldis and Rush vs. Villain Enterprises (Marty Scurll and PCO)
49	February 28	Bound By Honor	Nashville Municipal Auditorium	Nashville, Tennessee	PCO (c) vs. Dragon Lee for the ROH World Championship
50	February 29	Gateway to Honor	Family Arena	St. Charles, Missouri	PCO (c) vs. Rush vs. Mark Haskins in a three-way match for the ROH World Championship

=== 2021 ===
#	Date	Event	Venue	Location	Main event
51	August 20	Glory By Honor XVIII	2300 Arena	Philadelphia, Pennsylvania	Bandido (c) vs. Flip Gordon for the ROH World Championship
52	August 21	Glory By Honor XVIII	2300 Arena	Philadelphia, Pennsylvania	Matt Taven vs. Vincent in a steel cage match for Taven's ROH World Championship match
53	November 14	Honor for All	Chesapeake Employers Insurance Arena	Baltimore, Maryland	Bandido vs. Demonic Flamita in a no disqualification match

=== 2023 ===
#	Date	Event	Venue	Location	Main event
54	January 26	Jay Briscoe Tribute and Celebration of Life	Save Mart Center	Fresno, California	Claudio Castagnoli (c) vs. Christopher Daniels for the ROH World Championship
55	December 15	Final Battle	Curtis Culwell Center	Garland, Texas	Athena (c) vs. Billie Starkz for the ROH Women's World Championship

=== 2024 ===
#	Date	Event	Venue	Location	Main event
56	April 5	Supercard of Honor	Liacouras Center	Philadelphia, Pennsylvania	Eddie Kingston (c) vs. Mark Briscoe for the ROH World Championship
57	July 26	Death Before Dishonor	Esports Stadium Arlington	Arlington, Texas	Mark Briscoe (c) vs. Roderick Strong for the ROH World Championship
58	December 20	Final Battle	Hammerstein Ballroom	New York, New York	Athena (c) vs. Billie Starkz for the ROH Women's World Championship

=== 2025 ===
#	Date	Event	Venue	Location	Main event
59	February 17	Global Wars Australia	Brisbane Entertainment Centre	Brisbane, Queensland, Australia	Athena (c) vs. Alex Windsor for the ROH Women's World Championship
60	June 26	Global Wars Mexico	Arena México	Mexico City, Mexico	Bandido (c) vs. Máscara Dorada for the ROH World Championship
61	July 11	Supercard of Honor	Esports Stadium Arlington	Arlington, Texas	Bandido (c) vs. Konosuke Takeshita for the ROH World Championship
62	August 29	Death Before Dishonor	2300 Arena	Philadelphia, Pennsylvania	Athena (c) vs. Mina Shirakawa for the ROH Women's World Championship
63	December 5	Final Battle	Greater Columbus Convention Center	Columbus, Ohio	Athena (c) vs. Persephone for the ROH Women's World Championship
64	December 18	Global Wars United Kingdom	Cardiff International Arena (taped Dec. 13); Co-op Live (taped Dec. 17)	Cardiff, Wales; Manchester, England	Nigel McGuinness vs. Wheeler Yuta

=== 2026 ===
#	Date	Event	Venue	Location	Main event
65	February 5	ROH x Metroplex Global Wars	Esports Stadium Arlington	Arlington, Texas	Deonna Purrazzo, Hyan, and Maya World vs. M.I.T. (Athena, Billie Starkz, and Diamante)
66	March 27	Global Wars Canada	St. Clair College	Windsor, Ontario, Canada	The Good Brothers (Karl Anderson and Doc Gallows) vs. GOA (Toa Liona and Bishop Kaun) vs. Kaito Kiyomiya and Bishop Dyer vs. Bryce Hanson and Sheldon Jean to determine the inaugural MLP Canadian Tag Team Champions
67	May 15	Supercard of Honor	Wicomico Youth and Civic Center	Salisbury, Maryland	Athena (c) vs. Billie Starkz vs. Yuka Sakazaki vs. Trish Adora vs. Zayda Steel vs. Maya World in a Survival of the Fittest match for the ROH Women's World Championship
68	August 21	Death Before Dishonor	2300 Arena	Philadelphia, Pennsylvania	Athena (c) vs. Hazuki for the ROH Women's World Championship
