= Final Battle (2020) =

2020 Ring of Honor professional wrestling event

- Promotion: Ring of Honor
- Date: December 10, 2020 (aired December 18)
- City: Baltimore, Maryland
- Venue: UMBC Event Center
- Attendance: 0 (behind closed doors) (Note: The event was held without a paying audience due to the COVID-19 pandemic in the United States.)

Event chronology
← Previous; Gateway to Honor	Next → ROH 19th Anniversary Show

Final Battle chronology
← Previous; 2019	Next → 2021

Final Battle (2020) was a professional wrestling pay-per-view event produced by American promotion Ring of Honor (ROH). It took place on Thursday December 10, 2020 and aired on tape delay on Friday, December 18 at the UMBC Event Center in Baltimore, Maryland. It was the 19th event under the Final Battle chronology.

This was ROH's only pay-per-view event in 2020, as two previously scheduled events to have taken place in March (ROH 18th Anniversary Show and Supercard of Honor XIV) were cancelled due to the COVID-19 pandemic, with ROH subsequently going on a five-month hiatus during the pandemic, and resuming operations in August.

== Production ==
=== Storylines ===
Other on-screen personnel
Role:	Name:
Commentators	Ian Riccaboni (Pre-show+Main Show)
Commentators	Caprice Coleman (Pre-show+Main Show)
Commentators	Rocky Romero (Main Show)
Ring announcer	Bobby Cruise
Referees	Joe Mandak
Referees	Todd Sinclair
Interviewer	Quinn McKay

The event featured 10 professional wrestling matches, which involve different wrestlers from pre-existing scripted feuds, plots, and storylines that play out on ROH's television programs. Wrestlers portray villains or heroes as they follow a series of events that build tension and culminate in a wrestling match or series of matches.

== Results ==
No.	Results	Stipulations	Times
1^{P}	Tony Deppen defeated LSG, Josh Woods, and Dak Draper	Four Corner Survival match for a shot at the ROH World Television Championship later in the show	11:42
2^{P}	The Foundation (Tracy Williams and Rhett Titus) defeated Fred Yehi and Wheeler Yuta	Pure Rules tag team match	13:51
3	The Foundation (Jay Lethal and Jonathan Gresham) (c) defeated Mark Briscoe and PCO	Tag team match for the ROH World Tag Team Championship	12:40
4	Rey Horus defeated Dalton Castle	Singles match	9:10
5	The OGK (Matt Taven and Mike Bennett) defeated The Righteous (Vincent and Bateman) (with Vita VonStarr)	Tag team match	16:19
6	Danhausen defeated Brian Johnson by disqualification	Singles match Since Danhausen won, he received an ROH contract	8:44
7	Dragon Lee (c) defeated Tony Deppen	Singles match for the ROH World Television Championship	11:50
8	Shane Taylor defeated Jay Briscoe	Singles match	13:49
9	Jonathan Gresham (c) defeated Flip Gordon by referee stoppage	Pure wrestling rules match for the ROH Pure Championship	24:37
10	Rush (c) defeated Brody King	Singles match for the ROH World Championship	16:35
(c) / – the champion(s) heading into the match; P / – the match was broadcast on the pre-show
