= Gateway to Honor (2020) =

2020 professional wrestling event

Gateway To Honor
- Promotion: Ring of Honor
- Date: February 29, 2020
- City: St. Charles, Missouri
- Venue: Family Arena

Pay-per-view chronology
← Previous; Bound By Honor	Next → Final Battle

Gateway To Honor was a professional wrestling livestreaming event promoted by Ring of Honor (ROH). It took place on February 29, 2020, from the Family Arena in St. Charles, Missouri and was streamed live on ROH's streaming service Honor Club.

== Production ==
=== Storylines ===
Gateway to Honor featured storylines and ten different professional wrestling matches that involved different wrestlers from pre-existing scripted feuds and storylines. Storylines were produced on ROH's weekly television program Ring of Honor Wrestling.

== Results ==
No.	Results	Stipulations	Times
1^{D}	Cheeseburger, Eli Isom and Nicole Savoy defeated Brian Johnson, PJ Black and Sumie Sakai	Six-person mixed tag team match	—
2	Villain Enterprises (Brody King, Flip Gordon and Marty Scurll) defeated The Briscoes (Jay Briscoe and Mark Briscoe) and Slex	Six-man tag team match	10:50
3	Dan Maff defeated Alex Shelley	Singles match	9:22
4	The Righteous (Bateman and Vincent) defeated 2 Guys 1 Tag (Josh Woods and Silas Young)	Tag team match	9:40
5	Angelina Love (with Mandy Leon) defeated Session Moth Martina	Singles match	7:42
6	Dalton Castle (with Joe Hendry) defeated Jeff Cobb and Kenny King (with Amy Rose) and Tracy Williams	Four-way match	10:07
7	Bully Ray defeated Caprice Coleman	Singles match	8:23
8	Dragon Lee (c) defeated Dak Draper	Singles match for the ROH World Television Championship	9:30
9	Jay Lethal and Jonathan Gresham defeated MexiSquad (Bandido and Rey Horus)	Tag team match	12:07
10	Rush defeated PCO (c) and Mark Haskins	Three-way match for the ROH World Championship	10:22
(c) / – the champion(s) heading into the match; D / – this was a dark match

== See also ==
- 2020 in professional wrestling
