= Final Battle (2019) =

2019 Ring of Honor professional wrestling event

- Event poster featuring PCO and Rush
- Promotion: Ring of Honor
- Date: December 13, 2019 (PPV); December 15, 2019 (TV tapings)
- City: Baltimore, Maryland; Philadelphia, Pennsylvania
- Venue: UMBC Event Center; 2300 Arena
- Attendance: 1,000

Event chronology
← Previous; Death Before Dishonor XVII	Next → ROH 18th Anniversary Show

Final Battle chronology
← Previous; 2018	Next → 2020

Final Battle (2019) was a two-night professional wrestling event produced by American promotion Ring of Honor (ROH). It took place on Friday, December 13 and Sunday, December 15, 2019, at the UMBC Event Center in Baltimore, Maryland and the 2300 Arena in Philadelphia, Pennsylvania, respectively. Friday's show was a pay-per-view broadcast, while Sunday's was a set of tapings for ROH's flagship program Ring of Honor Wrestling. It was the 18th event under the Final Battle chronology.

== Storylines ==
The event featured professional wrestling matches, which involve different wrestlers from pre-existing scripted feuds, plots, and storylines that play out on ROH's television programs. Wrestlers portray villains or heroes as they follow a series of events that build tension and culminate in a wrestling match or series of matches.

PCO challenged Rush for the ROH World Championship by virtue of winning an eight-man single elimination tournament to determine the #1 contender for the title at this event. PCO defeated Kenny King in the first round, Dalton Castle in the semifinals and then his Villain Enterprises stablemate Marty Scurll in the final.

== Results ==
=== Night 1 Final Battle (PPV) ===
No.	Results	Stipulations	Times
1^{P}	Silas Young and Josh Woods defeated Dalton Castle and Joe Hendry	Tag team match	09:14
2^{P}	Kenny King (with Amy Rose) defeated Rhett Titus	Singles match	11:10
3^{P}	Jeff Cobb defeated Dan Maff	Singles match	08:50
4	Bandido and Flamita defeated Villain Enterprises (Marty Scurll and Flip Gordon) (with Brody King)	Tag team match	13:51
5	Vincent defeated Matt Taven	Singles match	13:32
6	Mark Haskins (with Vicky Haskins) defeated Bully Ray	Street Fight	16:30
7	Alex Shelley defeated Colt Cabana	Singles match	06:31
8	Maria Manic defeated Angelina Love (with Mandy Leon)	Singles match	06:24
9	Dragon Lee defeated Shane Taylor (c) (with Bishop Khan, Malcolm Moses, and Ron Hunt)	Singles match for the ROH World Television Championship	14:34
10	Jay Lethal and Jonathan Gresham defeated The Briscoe Brothers (Jay Briscoe and Mark Briscoe) (c)	Tag team match for the ROH World Tag Team Championship	21:54
11	PCO (with Destro) defeated Rush (c)	"Friday the 13th Massacre" No Disqualification match for the ROH World Championship	22:23
(c) / – the champion(s) heading into the match; P / – the match was broadcast on the pre-show

=== Night 2: Final Battle Fallout (TV tapings) ===
No.	Results	Stipulations
1	Mark Haskins defeated Hallowicked	Singles match
2	Nicole Savoy defeated Sumie Sakai	Singles match
3	Jonathan Gresham defeated Alex Shelley	Singles match
4	Bateman defeated Tracy Williams	Singles match
5	Silas Young and Josh Woods defeated The Briscoes	#1 contender Tag Team match for the ROH World Tag Team Championship
6	Flip Gordon defeated Rey Horus	Singles match
7	Villain Enterprises (PCO and Marty Scurll) defeated Jeff Cobb and Dan Maff	Tag Team match

== Reception ==
When the main event was announced, PCO's election as Rush's rival for the World Championship was questioned, due to his age (51 years old). Also, PCO's title win was criticized. On the December 23, Wrestling Observer Newsletter published a poll where the PCO vs Rush was voted as the worst match of the event. Dave Meltzer gave the match a one star, saying "There were style issues between the two and the craziness just didn’t work in a world title situation".
