= ROH Tag Wars Tournament =

Ring of Honor event and tournament series

Tag Wars is a periodic professional wrestling tag team tournament held by the U.S. based promotion Ring of Honor.

Tournaments have taken place in 2010, 2014, 2016 and 2019.

== List of winners ==
=== Tag Wars Tournament ===
Year	Wrestler(s)
2010	The Kings of Wrestling (Chris Hero and Claudio Castagnoli)
2014	reDRagon (Bobby Fish and Kyle O'Reilly)
2016	Beer City Bruiser and Silas Young
2019	Villain Enterprises (PCO and Brody King)

== Tournament results ==
=== 2010 ===
ROH's first Tag Wars Tournament took place from July 16, 2010 to August 28, 2010. The Finals of the tournament was a four-way Ultimate Endurance match for the ROH World Tag Team Championship.

No.	Quarterfinal Results	Time
1.	The Dark City Fight Club (Jon Davis & Kory Chavis) defeated The Embassy (Mr. Ernesto Osiris & Shawn Daivari)	7:47
2.	The Bravado Brothers (Harlem Bravado & Lance Bravado) defeated The Super Smash Brothers (Player Dos & Player Uno)	6:35
3.	The Embassy (Erik Stevens & Necro Butcher) defeated Grizzley Redwood & Rasche Brown	8:54
4.	The Briscoe Brothers (Jay Briscoe & Mark Briscoe) defeated The House of Truth (Christin Able & Josh Raymond)	15:58
5.	The All Night Express (Kenny King & Rhett Titus) defeated Delirious & Jerry Lynn	11:57
6.	Colt Cabana & El Generico defeated The American Wolves (Davey Richards & Eddie Edwards)	16:15

No.	Semifinal Results	Time
1.	The Dark City Fight Club (Jon Davis & Kory Chavis) defeated The Bravado Brothers (Harlem Bravado & Lance Bravado)	6:02
2.	The Briscoe Brothers (Jay Briscoe & Mark Briscoe) defeated The Embassy (Necro Butcher & Prince Nana)	7:37
3.	The All Night Express (Kenny King & Rhett Titus) defeated Colt Cabana & El Generico	14:12

No.	Final Results	Time
1.	The Kings of Wrestling (Chris Hero & Claudio Castagnoli) (c) defeated The All Night Express (Kenny King & Rhett Titus) and The Briscoes (Jay Briscoe & Mark Briscoe) and The Dark City Fight Club (Jon Davis & Kory Chavis)	28:28

=== 2014 ===
ROH's second Tag Wars Tournament took place on November 22, 2014 in Baltimore, Maryland. The Finals of the tournament was a Four Corner Survival Elimination match for the ROH World Tag Team Championship.

First round
The Briscoe Brothers (Jay Briscoe and Mark Briscoe)	Win
The House of Truth (J. Diesel and Jay Lethal)	10:32
The Addiction (Christopher Daniels and Frankie Kazarian)	Win
The Decade (B. J. Whitmer & Jimmy Jacobs)	11:11
A. C. H. & Matt Sydal	Win
The Young Bucks (Matt Jackson & Nick Jackson)	11:15

Final
reDRagon (Bobby Fish & Kyle O'Reilly) ACH and Matt Sydal	Win
The Addiction
The Briscoes	20:41

=== 2016 ===
ROH's third Tag Wars Tournament took place on June 11 and 12, 2016 in Hopkins, Minnesota, with the finals taking place in Milwaukee, Wisconsin.

First round
The Briscoe Brothers (Jay Briscoe and Mark Briscoe) Jay Lethal and Roderick Strong	Win
reDRagon (Bobby Fish and Kyle O'Reilly)
The All-Night Express (Kenny King and Rhett Titus) Roppongi Vice (Beretta and Rocky Romero)	Win
The Young Bucks (Matt Jackson and Nick Jackson)
Silas Young and Beer City Bruiser Lio Rush and Moose	Win
War Machine (Hanson and Ray Rowe)

Final
The Briscoes
The All-Night Express
Silas Young and Beer City Bruiser	Win

=== 2019 ===
ROH's forth Tag Wars Tournament took place on Jan 24 and 25, 2019 in Dallas, Texas and Houston, Texas, with the semifinals and the finals taking place on Jan 26, 2019 in San Antonio, Texas.

The winners would receive an ROH World Tag Team Championship match, and qualify for the 2019 Crockett Cup.

No.	First Round Results	Time
1.	Lifeblood (Juice Robinson and David Finlay) defeated NJPW LA Dojo (Karl Fredericks and Alex Coughlin)	8:37
2.	Villain Enterprises (PCO and Brody King) defeated The Kingdom (Vinny Marseglia and T. K. O'Ryan)	14:55
3.	Jay Lethal and Jonathan Gresham defeated Lifeblood (Mark Haskins and Tracy Williams)	23:32
4.	The Bouncers (Beer City Bruiser and Brian Milonas) defeated The Boys (Boy 1 and Boy 2)	7:06
5.	Coast 2 Coast (LSG and Shaheem Ali) defeated Shinobi Shadow Squad (Eli Isom and Cheeseburger w/ Ryan Nova)	10:38
6.	Kenny King and MVP defeated Colt Cabana and Willie Mack	15:37

No.	Semifinal Results (Triple Threat Tag Team Match)	Time
1.	Villain Enterprises (PCO and Brody King) defeated Kenny King and MVP and The Bouncers (Beer City Bruiser and Brian Milonas)	10:58
2.	Lifeblood (Juice Robinson and David Finlay) defeated Coast 2 Coast (LSG and Shaheem Ali) and Jay Lethal and Jonathan Gresham	10:47

No.	Final Results	Time
1.	Villain Enterprises (PCO and Brody King) defeated Lifeblood (Juice Robinson and David Finlay)	13:38
