= Supercard of Honor XIV =

Professional wrestling pay-per-view event produced by Impact Wrestling

- Promotion: Ring of Honor
- Date: April 4, 2020 (canceled)
- City: Lakeland, Florida
- Venue: RP Funding Center

Pay-per-view chronology
← Previous; ROH 18th Anniversary Show (canceled)	Next → Pure Excellence (canceled)

ROH Supercard of Honor chronology
← Previous; G1 Supercard	Next → XV

Supercard of Honor XIV was a scheduled professional wrestling pay-per-view event produced by American promotion Ring of Honor (ROH), that would have taken place on Saturday, April 4, 2020, at the RP Funding Center in Lakeland, Florida. Wrestlers from New Japan Pro-Wrestling (NJPW), and the National Wrestling Alliance (NWA) with whom ROH had partnerships, were scheduled to appear at the event.

The event would eventually be cancelled by ROH due to the COVID-19 pandemic.

== Announced matches at the time of cancellation ==
No.	Matches*	Stipulations
1	Marty Scurll vs. Jay White	Singles match
2	MexiSquad (Bandido, Flamita and Rey Horus) (c) vs. Will Ospreay, Amazing Red and Rocky Romero	Six-man tag team match for the ROH World Six-Man Tag Team Championship
3	Jeff Cobb and Dan Maff vs. Bullet Club (Kenta and Taiji Ishimori)	Tag team match
4	Nick Aldis (c) vs. PCO	Singles match for the NWA World Heavyweight Championship
5	Rush (c) vs. Flip Gordon	Singles match for the ROH World Championship
(c) / – the champion(s) heading into the match; *Card subject to change

== See also ==
- 2020 in professional wrestling
- List of Ring of Honor pay-per-view events
