= ROH 17th Anniversary Show =

2019 Ring of Honor pay-per-view

- Promotion: Ring of Honor
- Date: March 15, 2019 (PPV); March 16, 2019 (TV tapings)
- City: Sunrise Manor, Nevada
- Venue: Sam's Town Hotel and Gambling Hall

Pay-per-view chronology
← Previous; Honor Rising: Japan	Next → Road to G1 Supercard

ROH Anniversary Show chronology
← Previous; 16th Anniversary	Next → 18th Anniversary (cancelled)

ROH 17th Anniversary was a two-night professional wrestling event produced by American promotion Ring of Honor (ROH), which took place Friday, March 15 and Saturday March 16, 2019, at the Sam's Town Hotel and Gambling Hall in the Las Vegas suburb of Sunrise Manor, Nevada. Friday's show was a pay-per-view broadcast, while Saturday's was a set of tapings for ROH's flagship program Ring of Honor Wrestling.

== Production ==
Other on-screen personnel
Role:	Name:
Commentators	Ian Riccaboni
Commentators	Caprice Coleman
Commentators	Nick Aldis

=== Storylines ===
This professional wrestling event featured professional wrestling matches, which involve different wrestlers from pre-existing scripted feuds, plots, and storylines that play out on ROH's television programs. Wrestlers portray villains or heroes as they follow a series of events that build tension and culminate in a wrestling match or series of matches.

== Results ==
=== Night 1 - PPV ===
No.	Results	Stipulations	Times
1	Marty Scurll defeated Kenny King	Singles match	12:45
2	Jeff Cobb (c) defeated Shane Taylor	Singles match for the ROH World Television Championship	13:30
3	Mayu Iwatani (c) (with Sumie Sakai) defeated Kelly Klein	Singles match for the Women of Honor World Championship	9:00
4	Jay Lethal (c) vs. Matt Taven ended in a time limit draw	Singles match for the ROH World Championship	60:00
5	Rush defeated Bandido	Singles match	15:00
6	Villain Enterprises (Brody King and PCO) defeated The Briscoes (Jay Briscoe and Mark Briscoe) (c)	Las Vegas Street Fight for the ROH World Tag Team Championship	19:44
(c) / – the champion(s) heading into the match

=== Night 2 - TV tapings ===
No.	Results	Stipulations
1	Villain Enterprises (Marty Scurll, Brody King, and PCO) defeated The Kingdom (Matt Taven, T. K. O'Ryan, and Vinny Marseglia) (c)	Six-man tag team match for the ROH World Six-Man Tag Team Championship
2	Bandido defeated P. J. Black	Singles match
3	The Briscoes (Jay Briscoe and Mark Briscoe) defeated Jeff Cobb and Willie Mack	Tag team match Winners qualify for the 2019 Crockett Cup
4	Rush defeated Mark Haskins	Singles match
5	Kenny King defeated Tracy Williams	Singles match
6	Dalton Castle and The Boys (Boy #1 and Boy #2) defeated NJPW Young Lions (Clark Conners, Karl Fredericks, and Alex Coughlin)	Six-man tag team match
(c) / – the champion(s) heading into the match

== See also ==
- 2019 in professional wrestling
