= Shane Taylor (wrestler) =

American professional wrestler

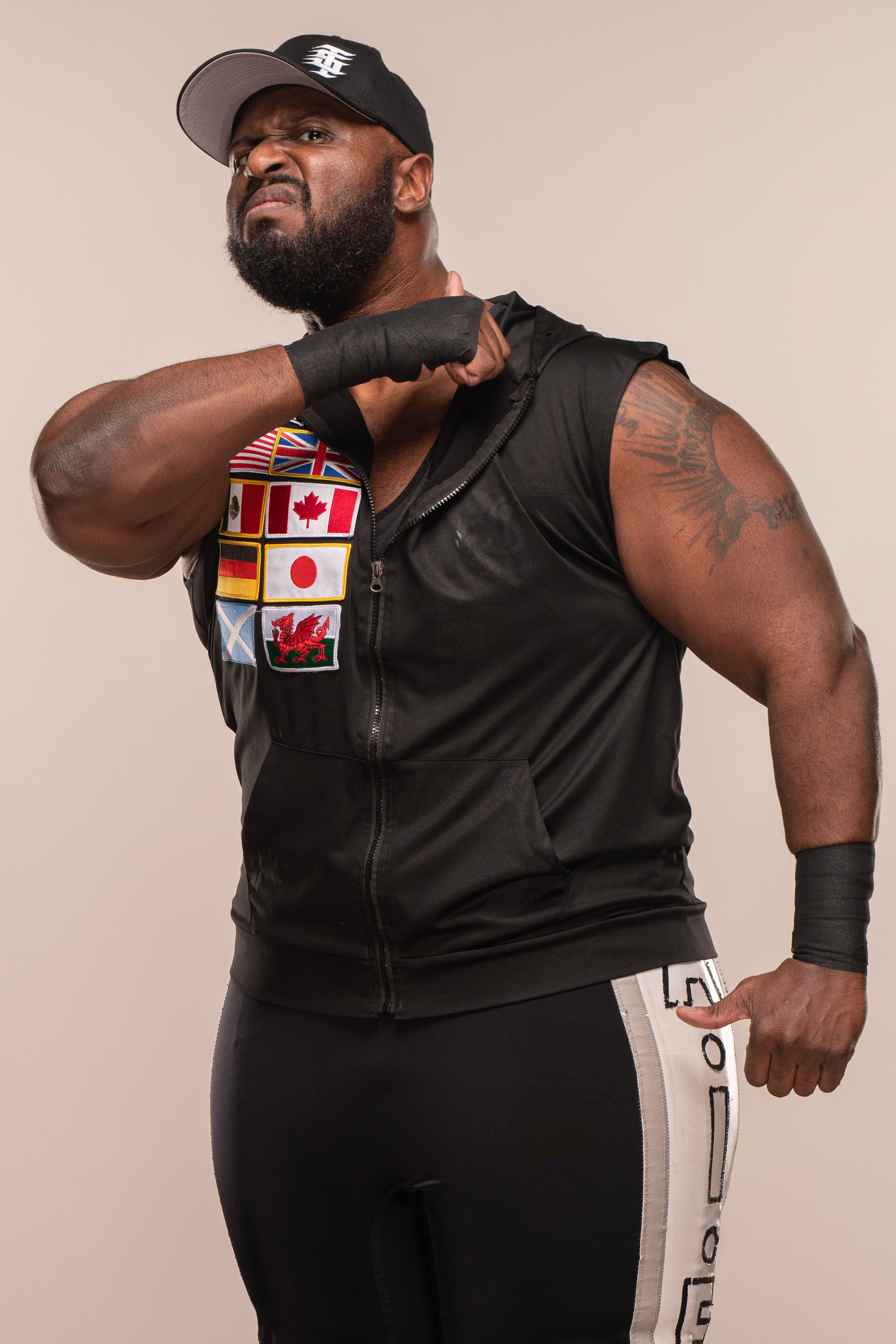
- Taylor in 2023

Personal information
- Born: Mark Shepherd; December 31, 1985 (age 40) Cleveland, Ohio, U.S.

Professional wrestling career
- Ring name(s): Jack Frost; Shane Taylor
- Billed height: 6 ft 1 in (185 cm)
- Billed weight: 315 lb (143 kg)
- Billed from: Cleveland, Ohio, U.S. Houston, Texas, U. S.
- Trained by: J-Rocc; Raymond Rowe; Ric Lieb
- Debut: November 13, 2007

Mark Shepherd (born December 31, 1985), better known by the ring name Shane Taylor, is an American professional wrestler. He is signed to All Elite Wrestling (AEW), where he is the leader of the Shane Taylor Promotions stable. He also performs in AEW's sister company, Ring of Honor (ROH), where he is a former ROH World Six-Man Tag Team Champion. He is also a former ROH World Television Champion.

== Early life ==
Shepherd grew up in the slums of Cleveland. His father, a reformed drug dealer who confronted drug dealers and intervened in fights in front of the family home, did not want his son to follow on the same path and advised him to go to college. Shepherd studied business management, graduating in 2009. He also practiced boxing for 20 years and played American football during his university years. He is now married and has children.

== Professional wrestling career ==
=== Early career (2007–2014) ===
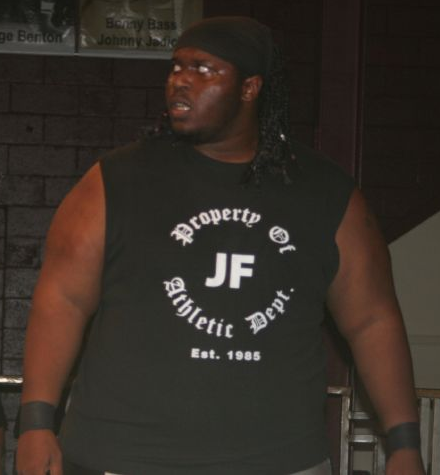
Taylor in September 2008

Shepherd debuted in 2007. Over the following years he wrestled on the independent circuit for promotions such as International Wrestling Cartel, Pro Wrestling eXpress, Pro Wrestling Rampage, and VIP Wrestling.

=== Ring of Honor / All Elite Wrestling (2014–present) ===
==== Debut; Pretty Boy Killers (2014–2017) ====
Shepherd debuted in Ring of Honor on November 15, 2014, losing to J. Diesel in a dark match at Glory By Honor XIII. He returned to ROH in April 2015, losing to the Romantic Touch in another dark match.

In May 2015, Taylor began teaming with Keith Lee. In September 2015, Taylor and Lee dubbed themselves the "Pretty Boy Killers". Over the following months, the Pretty Boy Killers faced teams including the Washington Bullets, the Alpha Class, the Get Along Gang, the All Night Express, and War Machine.

In August 2016 at Field of Honor, the Pretty Boy Killers took part in a gauntlet match to determine the number one contenders to the ROH World Tag Team Championship that was won by The Addiction. The following month at All Star Extravaganza VIII, they took part in a four way match to determine the number one contenders that was won by Colt Cabana and Dalton Castle.

At the first night of Survival of the Fittest in November 2016, the Pretty Boy Killers lost to the Briscoe Brothers in a three way match that also featured War Machine; the following night they defeated War Machine. In January 2017, Taylor signed his first contract with ROH. In February 2017 at Undisputed Legacy, the Pretty Boy Killers wrestled the Briscoe Brothers to a no contest. The Pretty Boy Killers subsequently disbanded following the departure of Keith Lee from ROH.

==== The Rebellion; title pursuits (2017–2019) ====
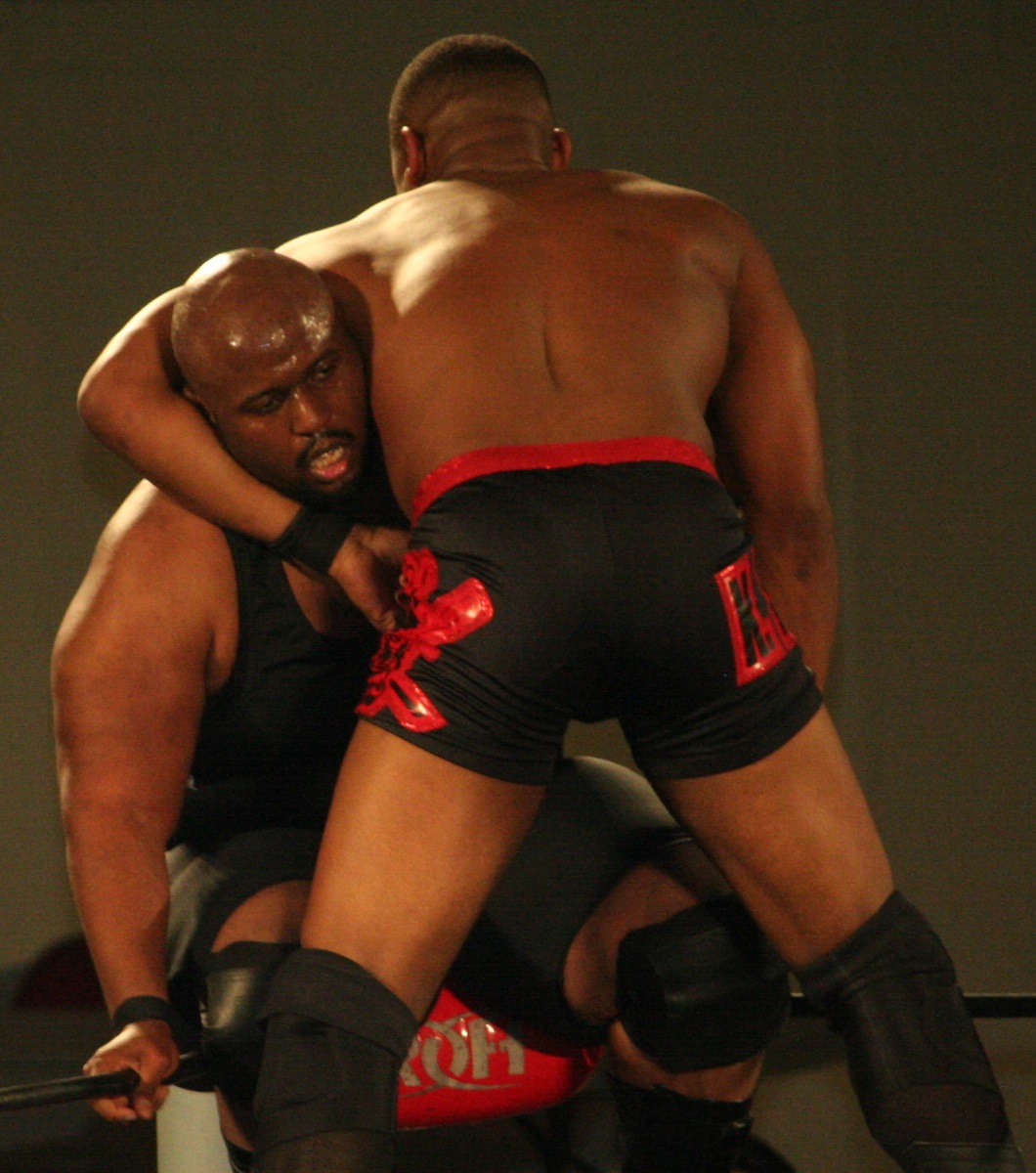
Taylor (left) wrestling Kenny King in February 2017

In spring 2017, Taylor joined the stable The Rebellion, which also included Rhett Titus, Kenny King, and Caprice Coleman. The Rebellion disbanded in June 2017 after losing a "losing unit must disband" match to Search and Destroy (Alex Shelley, Chris Sabin, Jay White, and Jonathan Gresham) at Best in the World.

On the third day of Global Wars, in October 2017, Taylor defeated Josh Woods. Later that month, he defeated Cheeseburger to become number one contender for the ROH World Television Championship. In November 2017, Taylor took part in the Survival of the Fittest tournament, which was won by Punishment Martinez. In December 2017 at Final Battle, Taylor competed in a four-way match for Kenny King's ROH World Television Championship that was won by Silas Young.

In February 2018, Taylor unsuccessfully attempted to become number one contender to the ROH World Television Championship. In March 2018 at Manhattan Mayhem, Taylor teamed with The Kingdom in a loss to Bullet Club. The following month at Masters of the Craft, Taylor teamed with SoCal Uncensored in another loss to Bullet Club. In May 2018, at War of the Worlds, Taylor lost to EVIL.

In October 2018, at Glory by Honor XVI, Taylor lost to Hangman Page. At the end of December 2018, Taylor signed an exclusive contract with ROH.

In March 2019 at the ROH 17th Anniversary Show, Taylor unsuccessfully challenged Jeff Cobb for the ROH World Television Championship. At the ROH and New Japan Pro-Wrestling G1 Supercard pay-per-view in April 2019, Taylor, Bully Ray, and Silas Young lost to Flip Gordon, Juice Robinson, and Mark Haskins in a "New York City street fight".

In May 2019, at War of the Worlds, Taylor won the ROH World Television Championship from Jeff Cobb in a Four Corner Survival match. Taylor successfully defended his title against Bandido at Best in the World in June 2019 and against Tracy Williams at Summer Supercard in August 2019. In September 2019, a storyline aired in which ROH ended Taylor's contract due to him criticizing the promotion's lack of interest in his booking. At Death Before Dishonor XVII later that month, Taylor retained his title by beating Dragon Lee, Flip Gordon, and Tracy Williams in a four way match. In October 2019, Taylor defended his title in the United Kingdom as part of ROH's "Honor United" tour. Taylor's reign ended in December 2019 at Final Battle in December 2019 when he lost to Dragon Lee.

==== Shane Taylor Promotions (2019–present) ====
In late-2019, Taylor formed the stable "Shane Taylor Promotions" (often called STP) with Jasper Kaun, Moses Maddox, and Ron Hunt. In early-2020, ROH went on hiatus due to the COVID-19 pandemic. After ROH resumed operations, Taylor returned in October 2020. At Final Battle in December 2020, he defeated Jay Briscoe. In February 2021, Shane Taylor Promotions (Taylor, Kaun, and Moses) defeated MexiSquad (Bandido, Flamita, and Rey Horus) to win the ROH World Six-Man Tag Team Championship. At Best in the World in July 2021, Shane Taylor Promotions successfully defended the ROH World Six-Man Tag Team Championship against Dak Draper, Dalton Castle, and Eli Isom. At Final Battle in December 2021, Taylor defeated Kenny King in a "Fight Without Honor". At the same event, Kaun, Moses, and O'Shay Edwards (substituting for Taylor) lost the ROH World Six-Man Tag Team Championship to The Righteous (Bateman, Dutch, and Vincent). ROH was subsequently placed on hiatus once again upon its acquisition by All Elite Wrestling owner Tony Khan.

Taylor made his return to ROH in December 2022 at Final Battle, teaming with JD Griffey in a loss to Swerve in Our Glory (Keith Lee and Swerve Strickland). He won a tournament to earn a ROH World Television Championship match, which he lost to Samoa Joe at AEW's All Out pay-per-view in September 2023. Taylor then reformed Shane Taylor Promotions (STP) with Lee Moriarty, and the following month at the WrestleDream pre-show, they participated in an eight-person mixed tag team match, which they lost. Taylor then lost to Keith Lee at Final Battle in December. The following year, he recruited Anthony Ogogo and The Infantry (Carlie Bravo, Shawn Dean, and Trish Adora) into his stable.

On August 29, 2025 at Death Before Dishonor, Taylor teamed with The Infantry to defeat Sons of Texas (Marshall Von Erich, Ross Von Erich, and Sammy Guevara) for the ROH World Six-Man Championship. At Final Battle in December 2025, Shane Taylor Promotions successfully defended the ROH World Six-Man Championship against SkyFlight (Dante Martin, Darius Martin, and Scorpio Sky). On May 15, 2026 at Supercard of Honor, the trio lost their titles to Dalton Castle and The Outrunners (Truth Magnum and Turbo Floyd).

On June 10 at Dynamite: Summer Blockbuster, Taylor failed to win the AEW Continental Championship from Jon Moxley. On the August 6 episode of ROH Wrestling, Taylor added Tehuti Miles to STP.

== Professional wrestling style and persona ==
Taylor wrestles in a "powerhouse" style. His signature moves include the "Marcus Garvey Driver" (a package piledriver), "Taylor Made" (a front powerslam), "Unprovoked Violence" (a lariat), and "Welcome to the Land" (a fire thunder driver).

== Championships and accomplishments ==
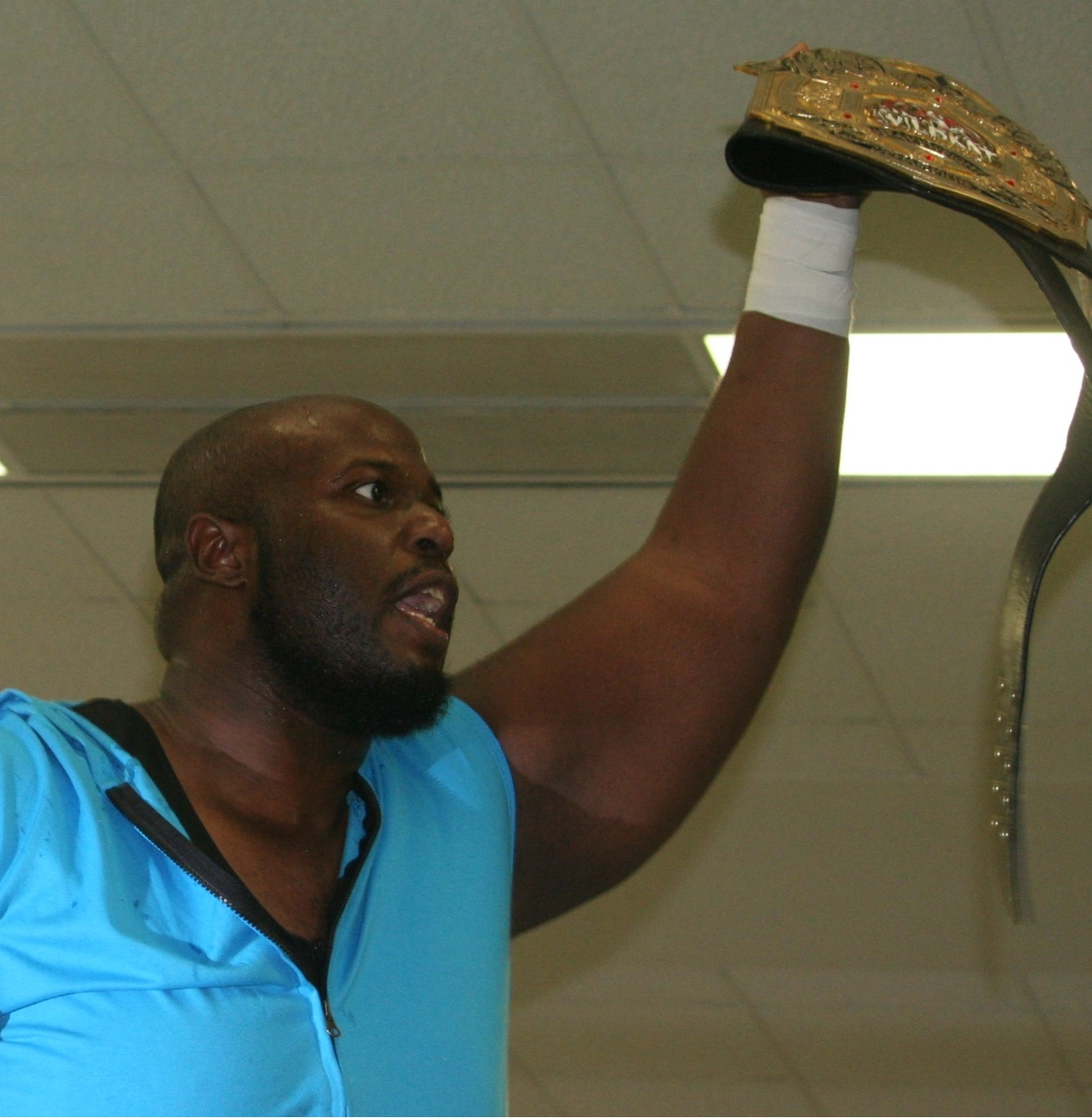
Taylor as the WildKat Heavyweight Champion in November 2015

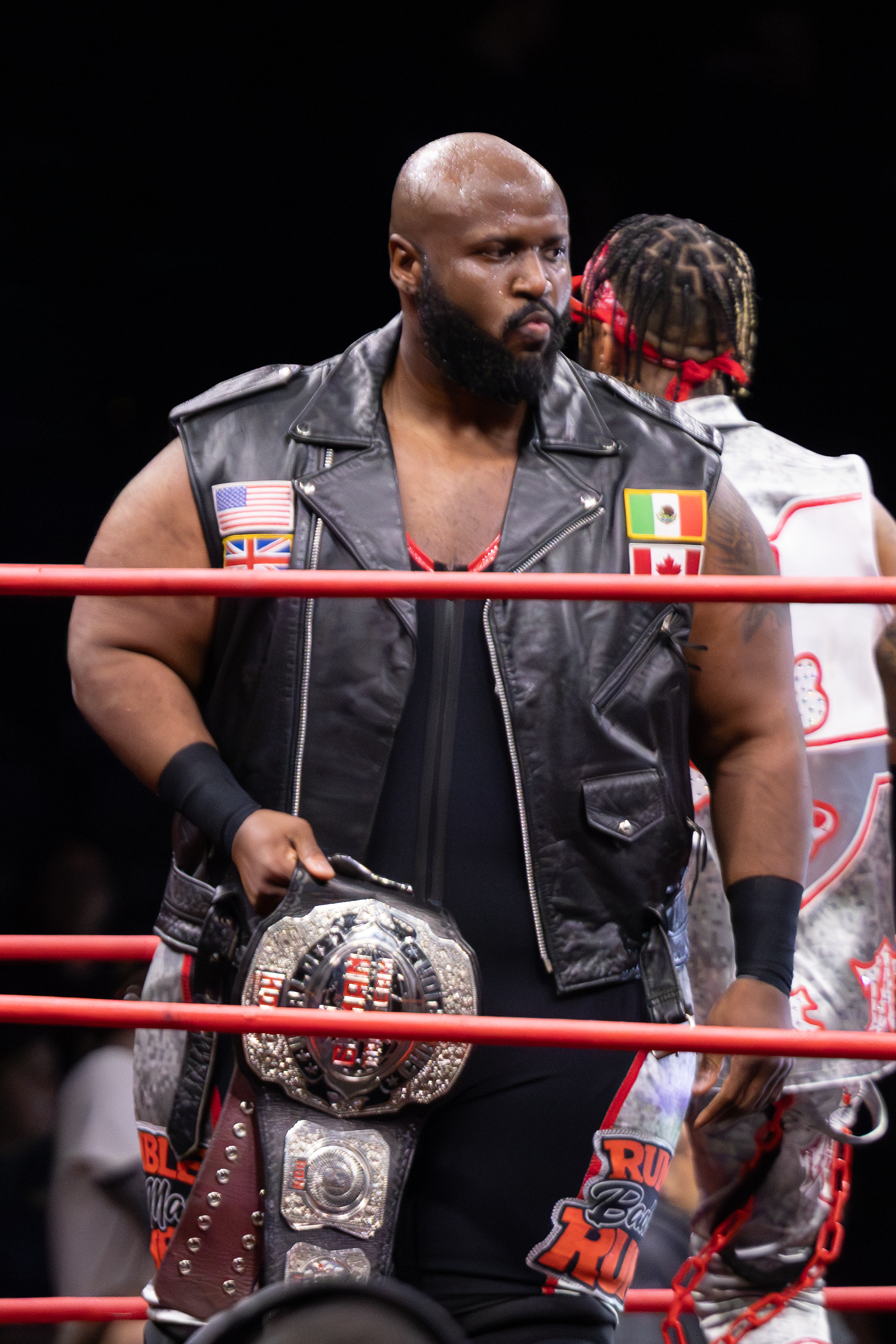
Taylor as one third of the ROH World Six-Man Tag Team Champions at Supercard of Honor 2026

- Cleveland Knights Championship Wrestling
  - CKCW World Heavyweight Championship (1 time)
- Red River Wrestling
  - Red River Heavyweight Championship (1 time, final)
- Texoma Pro Wrestling
  - Unified Texoma Pro World Heavyweight Championship (1 time)
- New Era Pro Wrestling
  - NEPW Triple Crown Championship (1 time)
- Pro Wrestling Illustrated
  - Ranked No. 65 of the top 500 singles wrestlers in the PWI 500 in 2020
- Pro Wrestling Rampage
  - PWR Heavyweight Championship (1 time)
  - PWR Lake Erie Championship (1 time)
  - PWR Tag Team Championship (2 times) – with Bill Collier (1 time) and J-Rocc (1 time)
- Ring of Honor
  - ROH World Six-Man Tag Team Championship (2 times) – with Kaun and Moses (1) and Carlie Bravo and Shawn Dean (1)
  - ROH World Television Championship (1 time)
- Reality of Wrestling
  - ROW Tag Team Championship (1 time) – with Tyree Taylor
- Renegade Wrestling Alliance
  - RWA Heavyweight Championship (1 time)
- VIP Wrestling
  - VIP Heavyweight Championship (2 times)
  - VIP Tag Team Championship (1 time) – with Keith Lee
- WildKat Pro Wrestling
  - WildKat Heavyweight Championship (2 times)
  - WildKat Heavyweight Championship Tournament (2015)
