= Villain Enterprises =

Professional wrestling tag team

Statistics
- Members: Marty Scurll (leader); PCO; Brody King; Flip Gordon
- Name: Villain Enterprises
- Billed heights: PCO: 6 ft 1 (1.85 m); King: 6 ft 5 (1.96 m); Scurll: 5 ft 9 (1.75 m); Gordon: 5 ft 10 (1.78m)
- Combined billed weight: 988 lbs (448 kg)
- Debut: December 15, 2018
- Disbanded: October 25, 2020
- Years active: 2018–2020

Villain Enterprises was a villainous professional wrestling stable consisting of Marty Scurll, Brody King, PCO, and Flip Gordon. The stable performed in Ring of Honor (ROH), where they are former ROH World Six-Man Tag Team Champions, the National Wrestling Alliance (NWA), where King and PCO are former NWA World Tag Team Champions, and Australia's World Series Wrestling (WSW), where Scurll is a former WSW World Champion. King and PCO have also won both ROH's Tag Wars tournament and the NWA/ROH co-promoted Crockett Cup tournament in 2019, and previously held the ROH World Tag Team Championship, while Scurll and King are former WSW Tag Team Champions. They were joined by Flip Gordon at Best in the World.

== History ==
After December 14, 2018's Final Battle pay-per-view, Marty Scurll's fellow stablemates in The Elite left Ring of Honor while Scurll remained under contract. During an in-ring promo at the following night's Ring of Honor Wrestling taping, Scurll was confronted by The Kingdom members Matt Taven, T. K. O'Ryan, and Vinny Marseglia. Scurll subsequently unveiled a new stable, Villain Enterprises, with Brody King and PCO, leading to a brawl between the two groups that ended with Villain Enterprises standing tall. At the ROH 17th Anniversary Show in March, PCO and Brody King defeated The Briscoe Brothers for the ROH World Tag Team Championships in a Las Vegas street fight, and at the following Ring of Honor Wrestling television taping, Scurll, PCO, and King defeated The Kingdom to win the ROH World Six-Man Tag Team Championship. They would go to lose the ROH World Tag Team Championship to Guerillas of Destiny at G1 Supercard.

PCO and King would followed that by winning the vacant NWA World Tag Team Champions in the finals of the 2019 Crockett Cup tournament in April. In May, Scurll revealed in a promo that Villain Enterprises was looking for a fourth member. This storyline carried over into the Best of the Super Juniors 2019 tour for New Japan Pro-Wrestling (NJPW). King would accompany Scurll throughout the tournament, marking King's and Villain Enterprises' debut in NJPW. The two would compete in non-block tag team matches, and King would accompany Scurll to the ring for his tournament matches. At Best in the World, after Villain Enterprises retained the ROH Six-Man Tag Team Championship against Lifeblood, Scurll would reveal Flip Gordon as the new member. Gordon and the group would then attack Lifeblood. The group would come to an end in October 2020 with Scurll's departure from ROH due to sexual assault allegations that were made public during the Speaking Out movement as King and Gordon began focusing on singles competition while PCO began teaming with Mark Briscoe.

== Championships and accomplishments ==
- Game Changer Wrestling
  - GCW Extreme Championship (1 time) – PCO
- National Wrestling Alliance
  - NWA World Tag Team Championship (1 time) – King and PCO
  - Crockett Cup (2019) – King and PCO
- North Shore Pro Wrestling
  - NSPW Maritime Championship (1 time) – Gordon
- Ring of Honor
  - ROH World Championship (1 time) – PCO
  - ROH World Six-Man Tag Team Championship (1 time) – King, PCO and Scurll
  - ROH World Tag Team Championship (1 time) – King and PCO
  - ROH Tag Wars Tournament (2019) – King and PCO
  - ROH World Championship No.1 Contendership Tournament (2019) - PCO
  - ROH Year-End Award (1 time)
    - Faction of the Year (2020) – Gordon, King, PCO and Scrull
- World Series Wrestling
  - WSW Tag Team Championship (1 time) – Scurll and King
  - WSW World Heavyweight Championship (1 time) – Scurll
