= Flip Gordon =

American professional wrestler (born 1991)

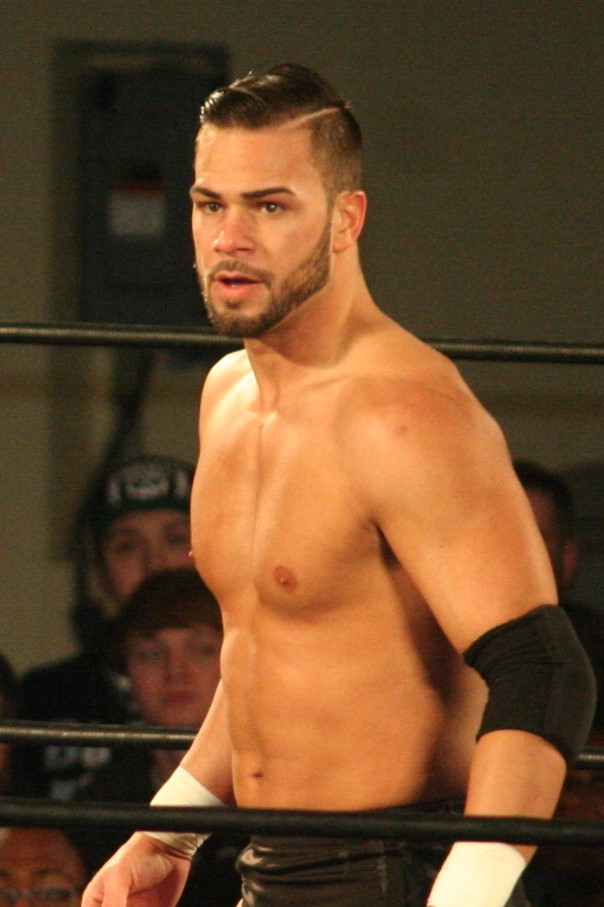
- Gordon in 2017

Personal information
- Born: Travis Gordon Lopes Jr. December 12, 1991 (age 34) South Weymouth, Massachusetts, U.S.

Professional wrestling career
- Ring name(s): Flip Gordon; Travis Gordon; El Hijo De Chico
- Billed height: 5 ft 10 in (1.78 m)
- Billed weight: 187 lb (85 kg)
- Billed from: Kalispell, Montana
- Trained by: Brian Fury
- Debut: May 6, 2015
- Military service
- Allegiance: United States
- Branch: United States Army National Guard
- Service years: 2012–2018; 2026–present

Travis Gordon Lopes Jr. (born December 12, 1991), better known under the ring name Flip Gordon, is an American professional wrestler. He is best known for his time Consejo Mundial de Lucha Libre (CMLL) and Ring of Honor (ROH).

Gordon gained prominence with his tenure in (ROH) from 2017 to 2021, where he was a member of the Villain Enterprises stable. He has also worked for the Japanese promotion New Japan Pro-Wrestling (NJPW), as well as on the independent circuit for Chaotic Wrestling, where he won the Chaotic Wrestling New England Championship, Pro Wrestling Guerrilla (PWG) and the National Wrestling Alliance (NWA). He signed with CMLL in 2023, where he became a former NWA World Historic Middleweight Champion and was the winner of the 2026 Reyes del Aire tournament.

== Early life ==
Travis Gordon Lopes Jr. was born on December 12, 1991, in South Weymouth, Massachusetts. He was raised in Kalispell, Montana, by his single mother Janis Patera; at the age of 13, Lopes’ family moved in with his stepfather on a farm in Columbia Falls. Lopes attended Flathead High School, where he wrestled and played soccer before graduating in 2010. He then attended North Idaho College, where he practiced gymnastics, served as the school's mascot Cecil the Cardinal and pursued a degree in criminal justice.

== Military career ==
From 2012 to September 1, 2018, Lopes served as a member of the Army National Guard Reserve, working as a combat engineer with specialization in explosives training. On September 17, 2026, Lopes announced that he had re-enlisted into the Army National Guard.

== Professional wrestling career ==
=== Early career (2015–2017) ===
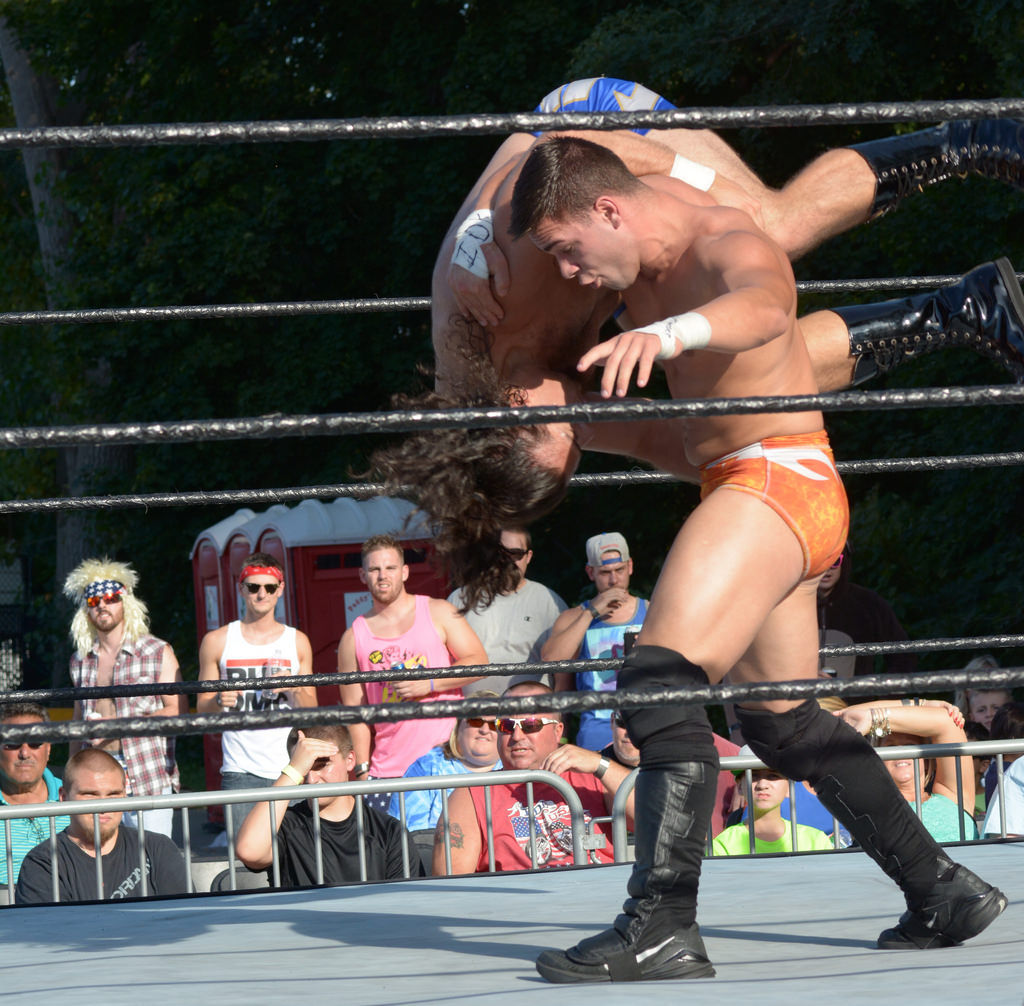
Gordon wrestling Brick Mastone in 2015

Gordon began training for a professional wrestling career in 2014 under Brian Fury at the New England Pro Wrestling Academy in North Andover, Massachusetts, facing Biff Busick in his first match on May 6, 2015. He appeared for Evolve at Evolve 65 on July 17, 2016, in a loss to Ethan Page. At a Chaotic Wrestling show on September 9, Gordon won the Chaotic Wrestling New England Championship in a six-way scramble match. He lost the title to Mike Verna on February 3, 2017, after six successful defenses. On March 30, he appeared at Game Changer Wrestling (GCW)'s inaugural Joey Janela's Spring Break event as part of the Clusterfuck Battle Royal, but was eliminated by eventual winner Jimmy Lloyd.

=== Ring of Honor (2017–2021) ===
==== Early years (2017–2019) ====
Gordon attended a Ring of Honor (ROH) tryout in Philadelphia in January 2017. He made his in-ring debut as a face on April 8, losing to Matt Sydal. On May 14, he officially signed with ROH. On October 14 and 15, Gordon took part in the third and fourth nights of the Global Wars 2017 tour. On the third, he and Best Friends (Trent Beretta and Chuck Taylor) unsuccessfully challenged Bullet Club (Kenny Omega and The Young Bucks) for the ROH World Six-Man Tag Team Championship. The next night, he lost to IWGP Junior Heavyweight Champion Will Ospreay. On December 15, at Final Battle, Gordon, Dragon Lee and Titán unsuccessfully challenged Adam Page and the Young Bucks for the title.

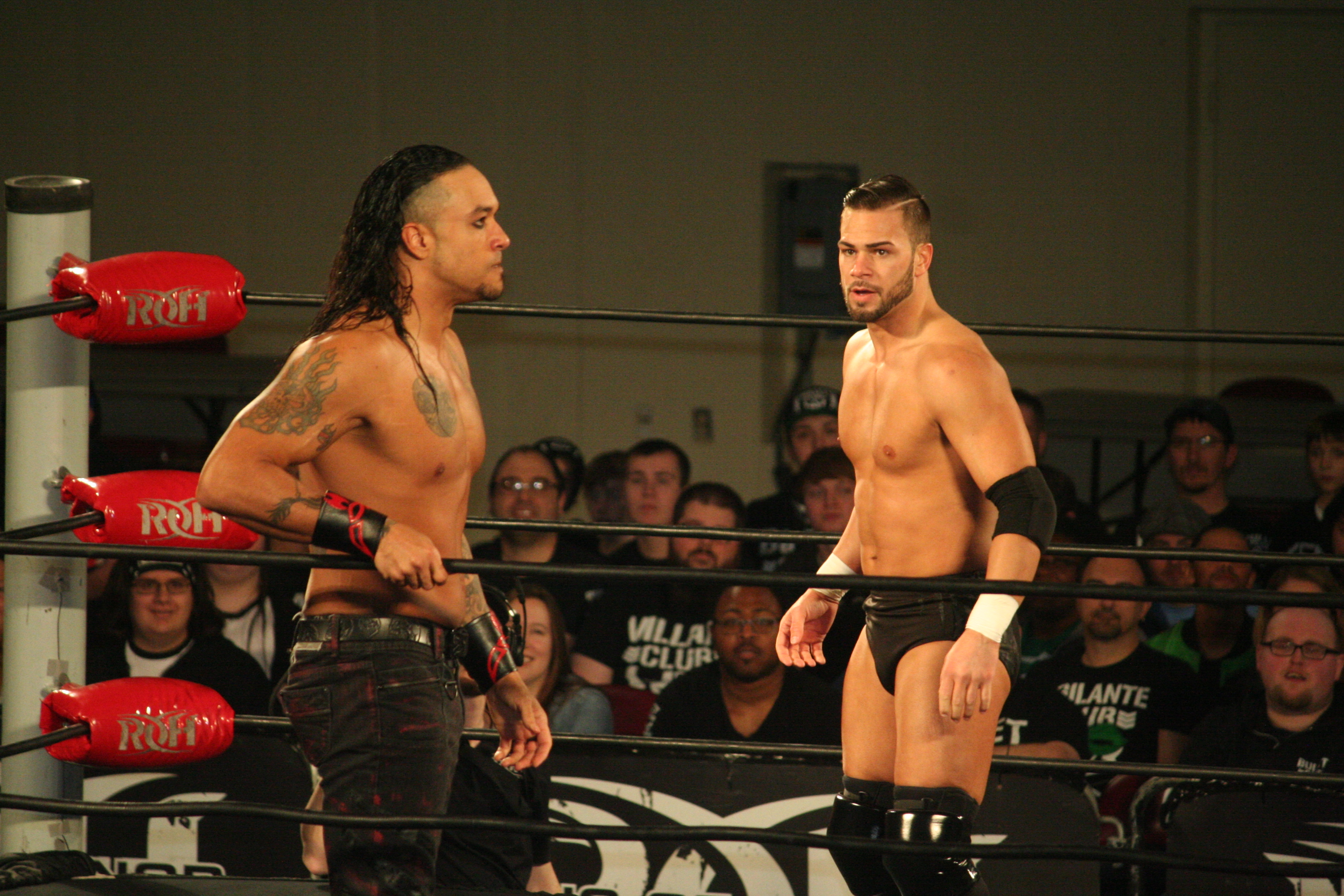
Gordon (right) during a match against Punishment Martinez in February 2017

At Manhattan Mayhem on March 3, 2018, Gordon lost to Cody; per stipulation, Cody would have to book Gordon at the independent event All In had he won. Six days later, at the ROH 16th Anniversary Show, he lost to Hiromu Takahashi. On the March 11 episode of Ring of Honor Wrestling, Gordon became the number one contender for the ROH World Television Championship, co-winning a battle royal with Shane Taylor before defeating him later that night. At Supercard of Honor XII on April 7, Gordon and the Young Bucks unsuccessfully challenged SoCal Uncensored (Christopher Daniels, Frankie Kazarian and Scorpio Sky) for the ROH World Six-Man Tag Team Championship in a ladder match. At the same show, Bully Ray cut a promo claiming young wrestlers like Gordon "destroyed the wrestling industry". Gordon lost his ROH World Television Championship match to Silas Young on the April 29 episode of Ring of Honor Wrestling. On Night 1 of ROH/NJPW War of the Worlds on May 9, he and Jushin Thunder Liger lost to The Briscoes (Jay Briscoe and Mark Briscoe).

At State of the Art on June 16, he was attacked by Bully Ray following a loss to Marty Scurll in a triple threat match also involving Jay Lethal. At Best in the World on June 29, Gordon defeated Ray by disqualification after Ray hit him with a low blow. Following the match, he was again attacked by Ray before being saved by Colt Cabana. At Honor for All on July 20, he failed to win the NWA World's Heavyweight Championship from Nick Aldis. After the match, Gordon was praised by Cody and then attacked by Ray. At Death Before Dishonor XVI on September 28, he and Cabana lost to Ray and Young in an elimination tables match. On December 14, at Final Battle, Gordon defeated Ray in an "I Quit" match to end their feud. During a match against Tracy Williams at ROH Honor Reigns Supreme on January 13, 2019, Gordon injured his knee after hitting Williams with a running single leg dropkick into the corner and rolled out of the ring after a springboard spear, losing via referee stoppage. It was subsequently revealed that Gordon tore his medial collateral ligament and would be out for a minimum of four weeks.

==== Villain Enterprises (2019–2021) ====
At Best in the World on June 28, Gordon lost to Rush. Later that night, he was revealed as the fourth member of Villain Enterprises by leader Marty Scurll after Villain Enterprises retained their ROH World Six-Man Tag Team Championship against Lifeblood (Mark Haskins and Williams) and P. J. Black. He, alongside Scurll and fellow members Brody King and PCO, subsequently attacked them, turning Gordon heel. At Manhattan Mayhem on July 20, they lost to Black, Haskins, Williams and Bandido. On Night 2 of Global Wars Espectacular on September 7, Villain Enterprises defeated Lifeblood in a Street Fight. At Death Before Dishonor XVII on September 27, Gordon unsuccessfully challenged Shane Taylor for the ROH World Television Championship in a four corners match also involving Williams and Dragon Lee. The next night, he lost to Williams in a No Disqualification match on the Fallout show, but defeated him in a Last Man Standing match at The Experience on November 2. At Final Battle on December 13, Gordon and Scurll lost to MexaBlood (Bandido and Flamita).

On February 9, 2020, at Free Enterprise, Gordon won a 20-person battle royal for a future ROH World Championship match. He signed a new multi-year deal with Ring of Honor on May 25. In early 2021, Gordon was paid by EC3 to cost The Briscoes their number one contender's match for the ROH World Tag Team Championship against La Facción Ingobernable (Lee and Kenny King). In response, Mark Briscoe cost Gordon a match against Flamita, leading to a match between the two at the ROH 19th Anniversary Show on March 26, which Gordon won. At Best in the World on July 11, Gordon lost to EC3. On Night 1 of Glory By Honor XVIII on August 20, he lost his ROH World Championship match against Bandido.

=== Consejo Mundial de Lucha Libre (2017–2018) ===
Gordon made his debut for Consejo Mundial de Lucha Libre (CMLL) in Mexico at the CMLL 84th Anniversary Show on September 16, 2017, teaming with Volador Jr. and Carístico to defeat Mephisto, Satoshi Kojima and Último Guerrero. On October 5, 2018, he returned to take part in the International Gran Prix tournament, where he was eliminated by El Terrible.

=== New Japan Pro-Wrestling (2018–2020) ===
On February 23 and 24, 2018, Gordon wrestled for the Ring of Honor and New Japan Pro-Wrestling (NJPW) cross-promotional "Honor Rising" tour. On the first night, he defeated Hiromu Takahashi and Kushida in a three-way match. The next night, he teamed with Ryusuke Taguchi in a loss to Los Ingobernables de Japon (Bushi and Takahashi). In May, Gordon was announced as one of the 16 participants in NJPW's annual Best of the Super Juniors tournament. He finished the tournament with three wins and four losses, failing to advance to the finals.

At G1 Supercard on April 6, 2019, Gordon and Lifeblood (Juice Robinson and Mark Haskins) defeated Bully Ray, Shane Taylor and Silas Young in a New York City Street Fight. He was set to compete in the Best of the Super Juniors tournament the following month, but was unable to due to visa issues. On the September 4, 2020 episode of Strong, as part of the "Fighting Spirit Unleashed" tour, Gordon lost to Jay White.

=== Independent circuit (2017–present) ===
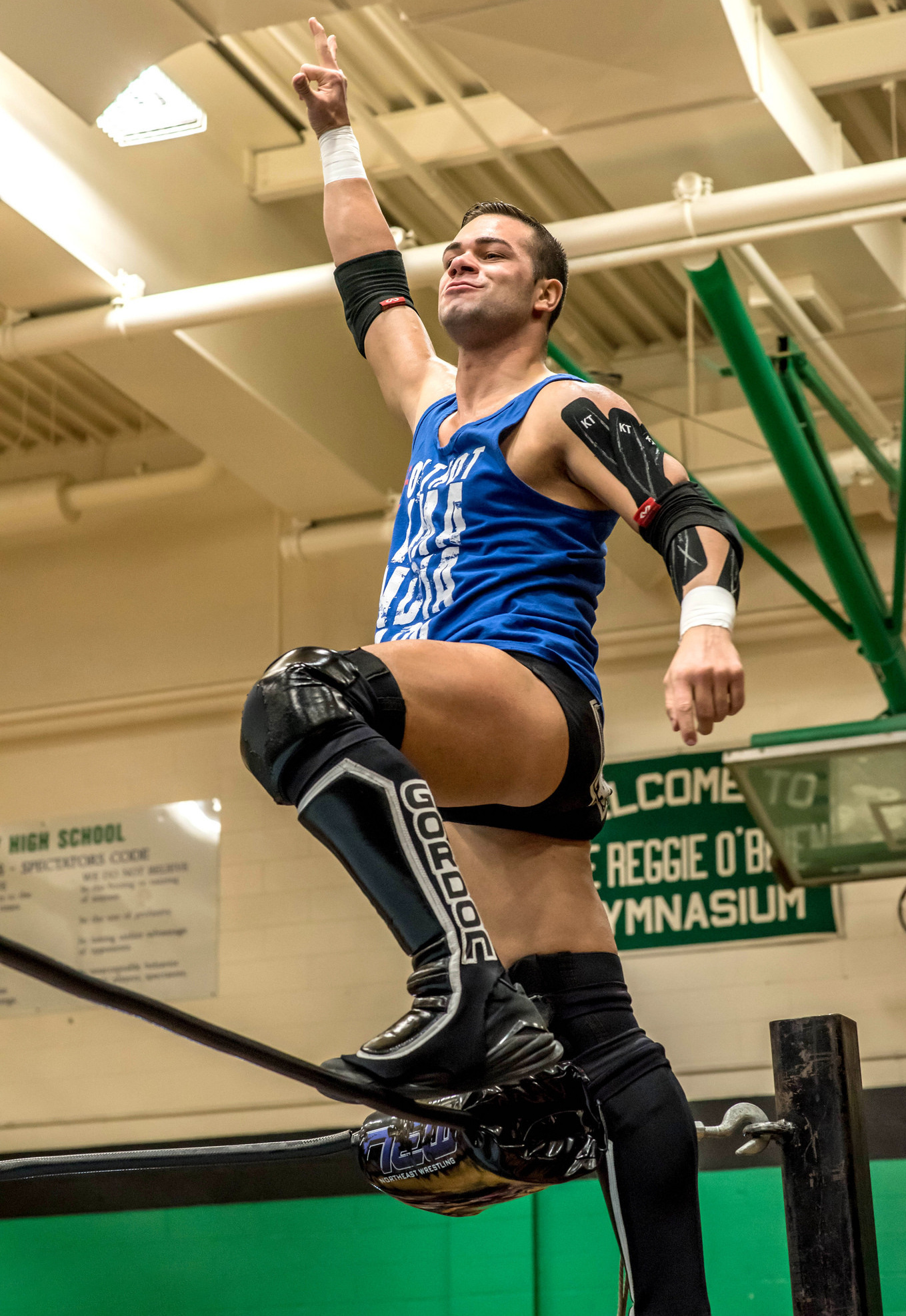
Gordon in 2017

On September 1, 2017, Gordon appeared for Westside Xtreme Wrestling (wXw) at Fans Appreciation Night, challenging David Starr for the wXw Shotgun Championship in a three-way match won by Ivan Kiev. On February 16, 2018, he lost to Zack Sabre Jr. at Pro Wrestling Guerrilla (PWG)'s Neon Knights show. On July 6, Gordon competed in the All Pro Wrestling/Pro Wrestling Revolution jointly promoted "King of Indies" tournament, defeating Jacob Fatu in the first round and Titán in the semi-finals, before losing to Dragon Lee in the finals. At the PCW Ultra pay-per-view Sound the Alarm on July 27, he unsuccessfully challenged Shane Strickland for the PCW Light Heavyweight Championship. At All In on September 1, Gordon, under a mask as El Hijo De Chico, won the Over the Budget Battle Royal for a ROH World Championship match against Jay Lethal later that night, which he lost.

Gordon was paired with Bandido for the National Wrestling Alliance's (NWA) Crockett Cup on April 27, 2019, defeating Guerrero Maya Jr. and Stuka Jr. in the first round before losing to Royce Isaacs and Thom Latimer in the semi-finals. On January 24, 2020, at NWA Hard Times, he unsuccessfully challenged Nick Aldis for the NWA World's Heavyweight Championship. On July 23, 2022, Gordon won MCW Pro Wrestling's Shane Shamrock Memorial Cup tournament, defeating Action Andretti, Brandon Scott, Joey Janela, Jack Evans and Rich Swann in the six-way elimination finals. In June 2023, Gordon and Fodder, as Control Your Narrative, participated in the Crockett Cup, defeating Sent2Slaughter (Dan Maff and Shawn Donavan) in the first round before losing to NWA Tag Team Champions La Rebelión (Bestia 666 and Mecha Wolf) in the semi-finals.

=== Return to CMLL (2023–2026) ===
On November 15, 2023, Gordon officially signed with CMLL. In his return match two days later, he teamed with Máscara Dorada and Místico (the former Carístico) to defeat Star Jr., Titán and Volador Jr. On February 6, 2025, he took part in the Reyes del Aire ("Kings of the Air") tournament, but was the second wrestler eliminated by Ángel de Oro. The following month, Gordon and Ángel de Oro were paired for the Torneo Nacional de Parejas Increibles ("National Amazing Pairs Tournament"), a tournament pairing a técnico (face) with a rudo (heel). They defeated Euforia and Gran Guerrero in the first round before losing to Dorada and Rocky Romero in the semi-finals. He unsuccessfully challenged Templario for the CMLL World Middleweight Championship on May 10. On July 12, Gordon participated in the Leyenda de Plata ("The Silver Legend") tournament, where he defeated Futuro in the first round before losing to Ángel de Oro in the quarter-finals.

On November 8, Gordon and El Hijo del Villano III defeated Difunto, Dragón Rojo Jr., Guerrero Maya Jr. and Neón in a torneo cibernetico to face each other for the vacant NWA World Historic Middleweight Championship. The following week, on November 15, Gordon defeated El Hijo del Villano III to win the title. He made his first successful title defense on December 13 against Romero. On February 3, 2025, he and Neón unsuccessfully challenged Ángel de Oro and Niebla Roja for the CMLL World Tag Team Championship. Later that month, Gordon defeated Dragón Rojo Jr. to retain his title. For being a champion, Gordon competed in the Universal Championship tournament, defeating Guerrero Maya Jr. and Templario in the three-way elimination first round on April 4. On April 25, he lost to Ángel de Oro in the semi-finals, which also involved Euforia. He made another successful title defense against Volador Jr. on July 22. During a six-man tag team match on August 1, where he, Capitan Suicida and Star Jr. faced Douki and Los Demonios Samurais ("The Samurai Demons"; Okumura and Yutani), Gordon suffered a ruptured patellar tendon in his right knee and left the ring on a stretcher. Shortly after, he underwent successful surgery and would be out of action for an unknown amount of time.

Gordon returned from injury on January 23, 2026, as he, Templario and Titán defeated Bárbaro Cavernario, Soberano Jr. and Yutani. On February 3, Gordon won the Reyes del Aire by last eliminating Yutani. On March 31, he defeated Volador Jr. to retain the World Historic Middleweight Championship. The following month, Gordon lost to Dorada in the three-way semi-finals of the Universal Championship tournament, also involving Averno. On July 3, Gordon lost the NWA World Historic Middleweight Championship to Volador Jr., ending his reign at 595 days. In September 2026, Gordon announced his hiatus from professional wrestling due to re-enlisting into the United States military.

== Personal life ==
Lopes married Barby Villela in 2023 and moved to Mexico full-time that same year; they have two children.

== Championships and accomplishments ==
- Chaotic Wrestling
  - Chaotic Wrestling New England Championship (1 time)
- Consejo Mundial de Lucha Libre
  - NWA World Historic Middleweight Championship (1 time)
  - Reyes del Aire (2026)
- Fight Forever Wrestling
  - Fight Forever Men's World Championship (1 time)
- MCW Pro Wrestling
  - Shane Shamrock Memorial Cup (2022)
- North Shore Pro Wrestling
  - NSPW Maritime Championship (1 time)
- Pro Wrestling Illustrated
  - Ranked No. 114 of the top 500 singles wrestlers in the PWI 500 in 2019
- Ring of Honor
  - Sea of Honor Tournament (2018)
  - ROH Year-End Award (1 time)
    - Faction of the Year (2019) – with Villain Enterprises
- World Series Wrestling
  - WSW Tag Team Championship (1 time) – with Brian Cage
- Xtreme Wrestling Alliance
  - XWA Firebrand Championship (1 time, inaugural)
