= Mark Briscoe =

American professional wrestler (born 1985)

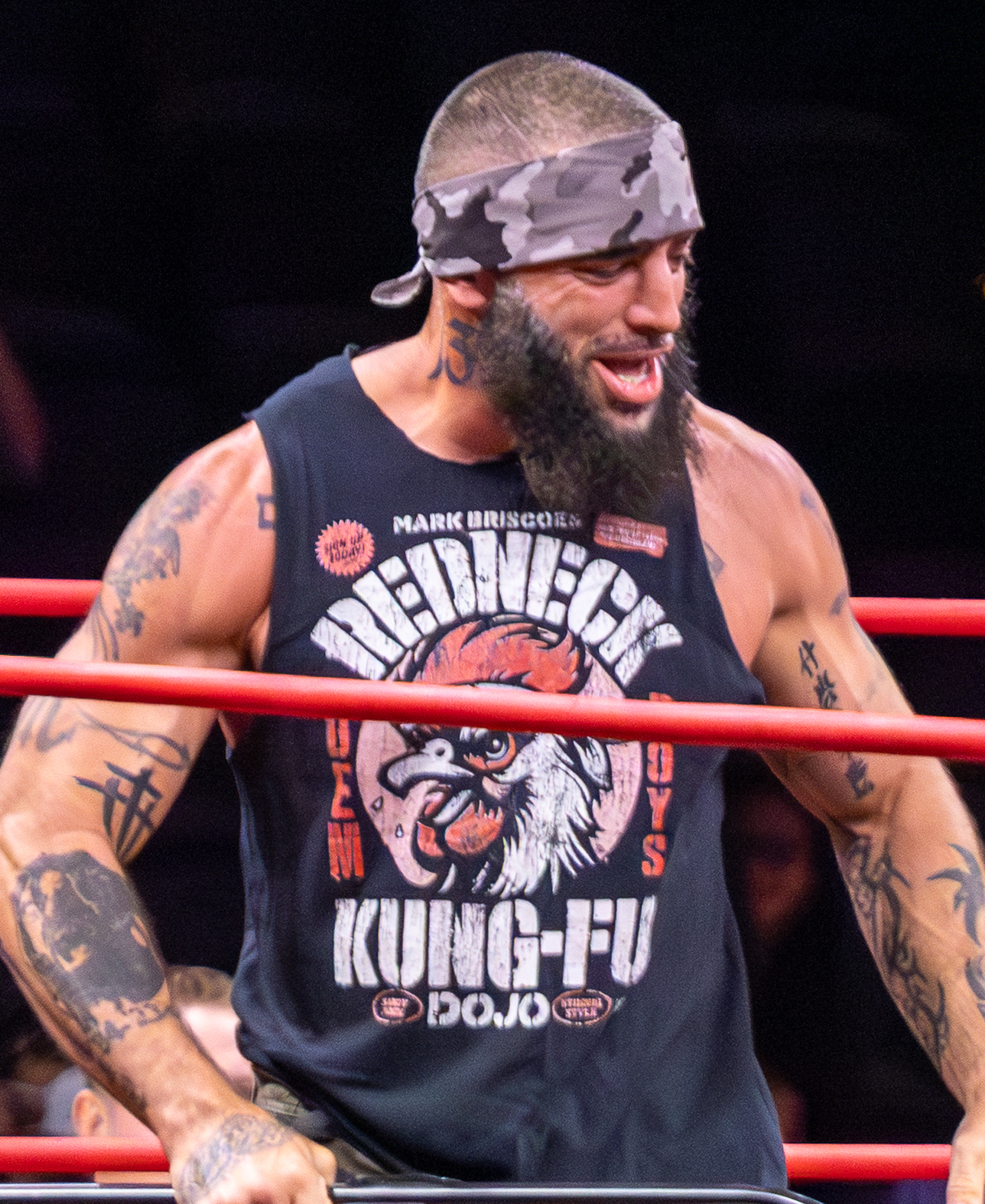
- Briscoe in May 2026

Personal information
- Born: Mark Pugh; January 18, 1985 (age 41) Laurel, Delaware, U.S.
- Children: 9
- Relative: Jay Briscoe (brother)

Professional wrestling career
- Ring name(s): Keno Murdoch; Mark Briscoe
- Billed height: 6 ft 0 in (183 cm)
- Billed weight: 229 lb (104 kg)
- Billed from: Sandy Fork, Delaware
- Trained by: Angelo Bonaccorso; Glen Osbourne; Jim Kettner
- Debut: May 20, 2000

Mark Pugh (born January 18, 1985), better known by his ring name Mark Briscoe, is an American professional wrestler. He is signed to All Elite Wrestling (AEW), where he is the leader of The Conglomeration stable and is a one-time AEW TNT Champion. He also makes appearances for AEW's sister promotion Ring of Honor (ROH), where he made a name teaming with his brother Jay as the Briscoe Brothers. In ROH, he is a former ROH World Champion, a former ROH World Tag Team Champion with his brother Jay a record 13 times, and was one third of the ROH World Six-Man Tag Team Champions with Jay and Bully Ray. In January 2022, the Briscoe Brothers were honored as inaugural inductees into the ROH Hall of Fame.

He and Jay are also former Impact World Tag Team Champions, and have wrestled in Japan, working for New Japan Pro-Wrestling (NJPW), where they held the IWGP Tag Team Championship once, and the NEVER Openweight 6-Man Tag Team Championship twice (along with Toru Yano), and Pro Wrestling Noah, where they were GHC Junior Heavyweight Tag Team Champions.

All totaled between AEW, ROH, TNA, NJPW and Noah, Mark Briscoe has held 21 championships, all but two (the ROH World Championship and the AEW TNT Championship) being shared with Jay in either a traditional or six-man tag team.

== Professional wrestling career ==
=== Combat Zone Wrestling (2001–2003, 2010–2012) ===
Jay and Mark Briscoe made their debuts for Combat Zone Wrestling (CZW) at Delaware Invasion on January 20, 2001, teaming with independent wrestler Eddie Valentine, being brought in to job as part of a three-on-one handicap match against Trent Acid. At the inaugural Best of the Best event, a show somewhat atypical of CZW in that it is a tournament spotlighting athletic junior heavyweight wrestling as opposed to violent hardcore matches, the two advanced past the first round in a three-way match with Nick Mondo where the stipulation was whoever took the fall would be eliminated. They were then matched against each other in the second round, with Jay winning and advancing further. This match was seen by fans as the best of the tournament, and seen in retrospect as having been responsible in large part for helping launch the brothers' careers, as they were new to the independent circuit and very young at the time.

After losing in title opportunities at Breakaway Brawl and A New Beginning, the brothers won the CZW Tag Team Championship on July 14, 2001, as they defeated the original H8 Club at H8 Club: Dead? They lost it in their first defense, to Johnny Kashmere and Justice Pain on July 28, 2001, at What About Lobo? Mark wasn't used for several months after that, but Jay continued on as a singles wrestler in that time, even facing Justice Pain for the CZW Heavyweight Championship at September Slam on September 8, which he did not win.

At the end of 2001 and into 2002, CZW's territory was shifting from Sewell, New Jersey, to Philadelphia, Pennsylvania, in order to hold events regularly at the former ECW arena, beginning with December 15's Cage of Death 3. At this event, they faced Nick Gage and Nate Hatred, but wore masks and were identified as The Midnight Outlaws. This was likely to get around the fact that Jay was only 17 and Mark only 16 at the time; this meant, as they were under 18 years of age, that they could not legally work in a sport wrestling exhibition in the state of Pennsylvania. As CZW regularly began holding shows in the Philadelphia area, the Midnight Outlaws made appearances at the next four CZW events. At A Higher Level of Pain on April 13, 2002, Jay appeared across the ring from the Midnight Outlaws, tagging with Ruckus against Mark and someone else. By this time, he had turned 18. Jay and Ruckus were won the match, and this was the last time either Jay or Mark appeared for CZW until April 12, 2003, where Jay and Mark both returned for Best of the Best 3. Jay was a surprise entrant after being taunted by AJ Styles, and Mark filling in for the injured Ruckus. Jay advanced to the semi-finals, where he lost to B-Boy, and Mark lost his fill-in match to Sonjay Dutt. The two faced off with the Backseat Boyz for the CZW World Tag Team Championship at Truth or Consequences on June 14, but failed to win the belts.

On December 11, 2010, at Cage of Death XII The Briscoes returned to CZW challenging newly crowned CZW World Tag Team Champions Philly's Most Wanted of Blk Jeez and Joker to a title match in January. On January 7, 2011, at "From Small Beginnings Come Great Things" Philly's Most Wanted retained the CZW World Tag Team Championships against the Briscoe Brothers in a no contest. The Briscoes then challenged Philly's Most Wanted to a no disqualification rematch. On February 12, 2011, at "Twelve: The Twelfth Anniversary Event" The Briscoe Brothers defeated Philly's Most Wanted to become the new CZW World Tag Team Champions. They lost the title back to Philly's Most Wanted on May 14, 2011. The Briscoes returned to CZW again on November 10, 2012, facing Dave and Jake Crist in a losing effort.

=== Jersey All Pro Wrestling (2001–2002, 2005) ===
Briscoe praying before a match in Jersey All Pro Wrestling in 2008

Mark Briscoe made his Jersey All Pro Wrestling (JAPW) debut on March 24, 2001, at March Madness Night 2, losing to Insane Dragon and Dixie teaming with his brother Jay Briscoe. It is unclear how, if at all, JAPW's ownership and management worked around Pennsylvania's child labor law, as both brothers were underage at the time of this and two subsequent appearances in the old ECW arena. They made three other appearances in JAPW in 2001, and unsuccessful challenge for Dragon and Dixie's JAPW Tag Team Championship on June 15 at Here to Stay. The six men went on to meet in a rematch of sorts at the next event, Royal Consequences 2 on August 10, 2002, Jay Briscoe and Insane Dragon defended the titles against Da Hit Squad and the team of Mark Briscoe and Deranged in a tables, ladders, and chairs match, which Da Hit Squad won. Two shows later, on September 20 at Family Crisis 2, Da Hit Squad successfully retained the title over the Briscoes in a regular match.

The Briscoes did not appear for JAPW again until late 2005, again in a tables, ladders, and chairs match for the tag team title, this time against the teams of Teddy Hart and Homicide, the Backseat Boyz, and The S.A.T. The match, which took place at JAPW's 8th Year Anniversary Show, was won Hart and Homicide. At the next show, Fall Out, the S.A.T. defeated them and thus became number one contenders to the tag team championship. More recent JAPW appearances came in early 2006, losing along with the Outcast Killers to the S.A.T. once again at Wild Card II in a tag team title match, and then at Brotherly Love to the team of Sabu and Sonjay Dutt, a match they also lost. In October 2008, the Briscoes competed at JAPW's 11th Anniversary Show against LAX (Homicide and Hernandez). During a brawl outside the ring, Mark suffered a large gash on the side of his head.

=== Ring of Honor / All Elite Wrestling (2002–present) ===
==== Debut and Tag Team Champions (2002–2004) ====
Mark Briscoe was unable to wrestle on ROH's first show The Era of Honor Begins in Philadelphia because of Pennsylvania's child labor laws. He accompanied his brother Jay to the ring at the event for a loss to Amazing Red. Mark was subsequently able to perform at Honor Invades Boston, where he defeated his brother in the second-to-last match of the night. The Brothers went on briefly to feud against each other, during which time Jay scored a non-title win over ROH Champion Xavier at Glory By Honor. This earned him a title shot at All-Star Extravaganza, which he did not win. At Scramble Madness, back in Boston, the brothers' storyline involved them picking their own partners for a tag team match. Jay picked past foe Amazing Red, whereas Mark's partner was Christopher Daniels, as he seemingly joined The Prophecy. Daniels pinned Red to win the match. The Brothers' feud against one another concluded at the First Anniversary Show, when Jay defeated Mark in a match, and the two hugged afterward to signify their reunion. Mark never explicitly left the Prophecy, but in forming a team with his brother, he stopped teaming with them.

Newly united as a team in ROH, the Briscoes began, in 2003, to feud with A.J. Styles and Amazing Red, then holders of the ROH Tag Team Championship, losing in title matches at Night of Champions, The Epic Encounter, and Death Before Dishonor, which by stipulation was their last match for the title for as long as Styles and Red held it. Before the last match, a poll was held on ROH's website, asking the fans if they wanted to see a third match between the two teams. Over 80% of respondents voted 'yes'. At Beating the Odds, they returned from a brief absence to score a pair of wins which were depicted in the storyline as being improbable, Mark over ROH veteran B. J. Whitmer and Jay in a Four Corner Survival match with ROH World Champion Samoa Joe, NWA World Heavyweight Champion A.J. Styles, and Chris Sabin, pinning Sabin to earn a future title shot at Joe. At ROH's Maryland debut, Tradition Continues, Joe retained over Jay.

The Brothers took part in the gauntlet match at Glory By Honor 2, which was held to fill the tag team championship left vacant by Red suffering a serious knee injury. They defeated and eliminated the Special K team of Hydro and Angeldust as well as The Ring Crew Express, before being eliminated by the other Special K team in the match, Izzy and Dixie, due to outside interference from Angeldust. After Izzy and Dixie later won the tag team title, the Brothers were granted a shot at it, at Main Event Spectacles. The reason given in the storyline was they were given the shot since they only lost in the gauntlet match because Special K cheated. In the opening segment of that event, they were aligned with Jim Cornette, because, in the storyline, Cornette wanted to create new champions. They attacked his former client, Samoa Joe, who Cornette abandoned since he already was a champion. They went on to win the belts later in the show. At The Conclusion, The Battle Lines Are Drawn, and The Last Stand, which was by stipulation Joe's last shot at the tag team title for as long as the Briscoe Brothers held it, they retained the belts over Joe and a different partner each time, A.J. Styles, Bryan Danielson, and Jerry Lynn respectively. Since Joe took pinfalls at The Conclusion (to Mark) and The Last Stand (to Jay), both brothers subsequently earned shots at his world title. Both fell; Mark at Final Battle 2003 and Jay at At Our Best in a memorable and bloody steel cage match.

They dropped the tag team title to the CM Punk and Colt Cabana at ROH's Chicago-area debut, ROH Reborn: Stage Two, working in ROH for the first time as outward heels. At the next show, Round Robin Challenge III, the title switched three times among the teams in the round robin challenge, the Second City Saints (Punk and Cabana), the Briscoe Brothers, and the Prophecy team of Dan Maff and B. J. Whitmer. The Briscoes defeated Maff and Whitmer in the fourth match of the night to win the title for a second time, and then lost it back to Punk and Cabana in the main event. The Brothers both participated in ROH's inaugural Survival of the Fittest tournament, with Mark going over Alex Shelley in his qualifier and Jay falling to Homicide. Mark lost in the elimination final. After losing a two out of three falls tag team title match to Punk and Cabana at Death Before Dishonor II Part 1, ending that feud, they lost in separate singles matches to members of The Rottweilers the next night. Between that and their victory in tag team action at Testing the Limit, it is likely that a feud was planned between the Briscoes and the Rottweilers.

==== Return and various feuds (2006–2013) ====
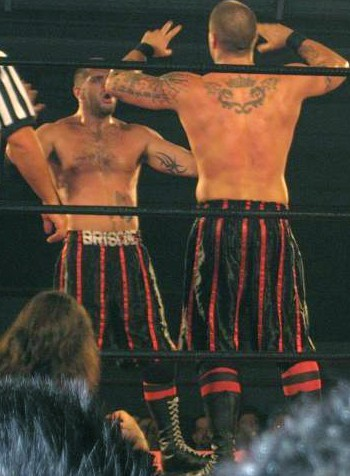
Mark (left) and Jay (right) at a Ring of Honor show in 2006.

The Briscoe Brothers returned to ROH at the Fourth Anniversary Show in 2006, forcibly including themselves in a match that was at first between the teams of Tony Mamaluke and Sal Rinauro and Jason Blade and Kid Mikaze. They won in their re-debut. They then feuded for the tag team championship again, but much as they had against Styles and Red three years earlier, they lost in three shots against the champions at the time, Austin Aries and Roderick Strong, at Ring of Homicide, Destiny, and Unified. As before, the storyline was that this cost them any chance at the belts for as long as those champs held them. It was around this time that the Brothers became enforcers for Jim Cornette's heel character as ROH Commissioner, fighting battles against his enemies, most notably Homicide and his partner Samoa Joe at Glory By Honor V: Night Two and in anything goes, falls count anywhere, elimination match at Dethroned. During this time, they also feuded with Kenta and his partners Davey Richards and Naomichi Marufuji, facing Kenta and Richards at Time to Man Up and Kenta and Marufuji at Glory By Honor V: Night One.

At Fifth Year Festival: Chicago, the Brothers finally reached the top of the mountain again, defeating Christopher Daniels and Matt Sydal to win the tag team championship. Their reign was brief, as they dropped the belts to Naruki Doi and Shingo Takagi in their first defense, at Fifth Year Festival: Liverpool. After this match, the storyline was that the brothers felt they needed to "man up" due to losing the title in their first defense, just as they had the GHC Junior Heavyweight Tag Team Championship earlier in the year. Thus, the two faced off what was described as "one time only" at Fifth Year Festival: Finale. The match ended in a draw, with both of them unable to answer the referee's standing ten-count. At the next event, All Star Extravaganza III, they won the title back from Doi and Shingo, but in the course of the match Mark was seriously injured attempting a Shooting Star Press to the floor. Mark was kept in the ICU of hospital for two nights, and suffered a seizure there before eventually being released. Two weeks later, at Fighting Spirit, Mark made an unadvertised and unannounced return, entering through the crowd to come to his brother's side during his match with Erick Stevens against Kevin Steen and El Generico. The storyline was that with Mark out and injured, Jay was tagging with Stevens as a replacement. The No Remorse Corps then ran in and attacked Stevens, and Jay was momentarily left without a partner until Mark entered. Mark eventually suffered the fall in the match after several bumps to the head. They then began to feud with Steen and Generico. After successfully retaining the tag title over Claudio Castagnoli and Matt Sydal at ROH's first pay-per-view Respect is Earned, Steen and Generico showed up and immediately demanded their title shot; the scene followed with a wild brawl all over the building. The feud was followed on both ROH's standard canon, with Steen defeating Mark at A Fight at the Roxbury, and the PPV series, with the Brothers successfully retaining the tag team title against Steen and Generico at Driven, after which Steen repeatedly attacked both brothers with a ladder. The Briscoes then retained over Steen and Generico in a steel cage match at Caged Rage and in ROH's first-ever ladder match at Man Up.

After the ladder match, Jimmy Jacobs and the other members of The Age of the Fall attacked the Brothers and hanged Jay upside-down from the apparatus which held up the belts. It was announced that this would not be included in the footage shown on PPV, although it was soon after shown on ROH's video wire and was included with the DVD of the event. After Mark was again injured in a motorcycle accident, though considerably less serious, Jay was alone in a match held at the taping for ROH's fourth PPV, Undeniable. This was an anything goes match against Necro Butcher of the Age of the Fall, which he did not win. On November 30, the Briscoes had a match which was taped to be included in Undeniable, a tag team title defense against Davey Richards and Rocky Romero, which they won. At Final Battle 2007, the Briscoes lost the ROH World Tag Team Championship to Jimmy Jacobs and Tyler Black of The Age of the Fall, but won it back on April 12, 2008, at Injustice, defeating Richards and Romero, who had since won the championship from Jacobs and Black. On April 20, ROH's official website reported that Mark had sustained a wrist injury due to Jacobs stabbing him with his trademark rail spike and stood to miss up to six months. The next day, the company announced that Jay and a partner of his choosing would continue to be recognized as the tag team champions. This partner was later revealed to be Austin Aries.

After their successful defense against Jacobs & Black on May 10 at A New Level, the championship was declared vacant. Mark returned to active competition at Northern Navigation on July 25, teaming with Jay and Aries to defeat The Age of the Fall in a no disqualification match. On December 19, 2009, at Final Battle 2009, the Briscoes won the ROH World Tag Team Championship for a record sixth time by defeating The American Wolves (Davey Richards and Eddie Edwards). They went on to lose the championship to The Kings of Wrestling (Chris Hero and Claudio Castagnoli) at The Big Bang! pay-per-view on April 3. On August 23, 2010, Ring of Honor announced that the company had signed the Briscoe Brothers to contract extensions. The Briscoe Brothers ended their feud with the Kings of Wrestling on December 18 at Final Battle 2010, where they teamed with their father Mike "Papa" Briscoe in a six-man tag team match, where they defeated Hero, Castagnoli and their manager Shane Hagadorn. On January 25, 2011, Ring of Honor announced that the Briscoe Brothers had signed new contract extensions with the promotion. On March 19 at Manhattan Mayhem IV, the Briscoe Brothers turned heel after suffering an upset loss against the All Night Xpress (Kenny King and Rhett Titus). On September 17 at Death Before Dishonor IX, the All Night Xpress defeated the Briscoe Brothers in a ladder match to become the number one contenders to the ROH World Tag Team Championship. At Final Battle 2011 on December 23, the Briscoes defeated Wrestling's Greatest Tag Team (Charlie Haas and Shelton Benjamin) to win the ROH World Tag Team Championship for the seventh time. On May 12, 2012, at Border Wars, the Briscoe Brothers lost the title back to Haas and Benjamin. On December 16 at Final Battle 2012: Doomsday, the Briscoe Brothers defeated S.C.U.M. (Jimmy Jacobs and Steve Corino) and Caprice Coleman and Cedric Alexander in a three-way match to win the ROH World Tag Team Championship for the eighth time. They lost the title to Bobby Fish and Kyle O'Reilly on March 2, 2013, at the 11th Anniversary Show.

==== Singles competition (2013–2017) ====
On June 22 at Best in the World 2013, Mark unsuccessfully challenged his brother Jay Briscoe for the ROH World Championship. On June 25, it was reported that both Jay's and Mark's contracts with ROH had expired and would not be renewed. On July 16, ROH announced Mark as the sixteenth and final entrant in a tournament to determine the new ROH World Champion. Mark was eliminated from the tournament in his first round match on July 27 by Adam Cole. On September 28, Mark won the Honor Rumble to earn a shot at the ROH World Championship, but was later that same event defeated by Cole. On May 17, 2014, the Briscoe Brothers took part in the ROH/New Japan Pro-Wrestling co-produced War of the Worlds iPPV, where they unsuccessfully challenged Bullet Club (Doc Gallows and Karl Anderson) for the IWGP Tag Team Championship.

At Death Before Dishonor XIV Mark was unsuccessfully of defeating Bobby Fish for the ROH World Television Championship. At Field of Honor The Briscoes (Jay Briscoe and Mark Briscoe) was in a Tag Team Gauntlet match was they were unsuccessfully of winning the ROH World Tag Team Championship which included The Addiction (Christopher Daniels and Frankie Kazarian), War Machine (Hanson and Ray Rowe), The All Night Express (Rhett Titus and Kenny King), Chaos (Gedo and Toru Yano), Cheeseburger and Will Ferrara and Leon St. Giovanni and Shaheem Ali. At All Star Extravaganza VIII The Briscoes teamed with Toru Yano and were defeated by Kushida, A. C. H. and Jay White in the first round of the ROH World Six-Man Tag Team Championship Tournament. At Final Battle The Briscoe unsuccessfully against The Young Bucks (Matt Jackson and Nick Jackson) for the ROH World Tag Team Championship.

==== Return to the tag team division (2017–2023) ====
On March 11, 2017, The Briscoes and Bully Ray defeated The Kingdom to win the ROH World Six-Man Tag Team Championship. They lost the title to Dalton Castle and The Boys on June 23 at Best in the World. The Briscoes and Bully Ray challenged for the title again on September 22 at Death Before Dishonor XV, but were defeated by Hangman Page and The Young Bucks, when Jay turned on Ray. On October 20, Mark also turned on Ray, attacking him and Tommy Dreamer with his brother.

On March 9, 2018, at ROH 16th Anniversary Show, The Briscoes defeated The Motor City Machine Guns to win the ROH World Tag Team Championship for the ninth time. They lost the titles on October 14, 2018, against So Cal Uncensored (Frankie Kazarian and Scorpio Sky). They won the titles back on December 14, 2018, for the tenth time, but lost them to Villain Enterprises at the ROH 17th Anniversary Show. The Briscoes failed to win the titles and additionally the IWGP Tag Team Championships at G1 Supercard in April, losing to Guerrillas of Destiny in a four-way tag match also involving Villain Enterprises and Los Ingobernables de Japon. At ROH/NJPW War of the Worlds in May, The Briscoes lost to Guerillas of Destiny once more, failing to win the ROH World Tag Team Championships. In July, The Briscoes defeated Guerillas of Destiny in a New York City Street Fight, to win the ROH World Tag Team Championships for the eleventh time. At Death Before Dishonor XVII, The Briscoes retained the titles against LifeBlood (Bandido and Mark Haskins). At Final Battle, the Briscoes lost the titles to Jay Lethal and Jonathan Gresham, ending their eleventh reign at 146 days.

The following year at Gateway to Honor, The Briscoes teamed with Slex, losing to Villain Enterprises. This match would turn out to be the Briscoes and many other ROH talent's last match with the company for the majority of 2020, due to the suspension of all ROH events in response to the COVID-19 pandemic. The Briscoes returned to ROH events in October, with no fans in attendance. In December, The Briscoes competed separately at Final Battle, the only ROH PPV of the year. The following year at Best in the World, The Briscoes defeated Brian Johnson and PJ Black, with events returning to having fans in attendance.

On October 27, 2021, Ring of Honor announced that it would go on a hiatus after Final Battle in December, with a return tentatively scheduled for April 2022. All personnel, including The Briscoes, would also be released from their contracts, but still paid till their contracts expired. It was also announced that champions would be able to defend ROH championships in other promotions. At Final Battle in December, The Briscoes wrestled their final match for ROH defeating The Kingdom to win the ROH World Tag Team Championships for the twelfth time. After the match, The Briscoes thanked the ROH fans for their support and challenged any team to face them for the titles, but were interrupted by AEW's FTR who attacked the Briscoes.

During the remainder of 2021 and early 2022, The Briscoes successfully defended the ROH World Tag Team Championships at various independent shows. On March 2, 2022, during All Elite Wrestling (AEW)'s live weekly series, AEW Dynamite, owner & executive Tony Khan announced that he had acquired Ring of Honor from the Sinclair Broadcast Group. Following this, ROH returned for the first time since Final Battle at Supercard of Honor XV, where The Briscoes finally faced FTR for the ROH World Tag Team Championships, losing the titles, ending their twelfth reign at 111 days. The Briscoes next appeared in July at Death Before Dishonor, facing FTR for the titles in a two out of three falls match. The match ended with FTR defeating The Briscoes 2–1 after 43 minutes and 26 seconds, retaining the titles in another highly praised match. On December 10, at Final Battle, The Briscoes and FTR faced each other in a third match, which was a Dog Collar match, where The Briscoes finally defeated FTR, winning the ROH World Tag Team Titles for the thirteenth time. Post match, FTR were attacked by Colten and Austin Gunn, who had targeted FTR for weeks on AEW programming, causing The Briscoes to return to the ring to chase off the Gunns. In the ring, The Briscoes and FTR embraced, ending their year-long feud. This would be the last match The Briscoes would have in ROH before Jay's passing on January 17, 2023.

==== Return to singles competition (2023–2024) ====
Jay's previous anti-LGBTQ tweets were said to have stopped the brothers from being considered in tryouts for the WWE, as well as being banned from appearing on All Elite Wrestling television and pay-per-views due to the intervention of an unnamed WarnerMedia executive. However, this ban was lifted shortly after Jay's death in a car accident on January 17, 2023. On the January 25, 2023 edition of AEW Dynamite (on what would have been his brother's 39th birthday), Mark Briscoe would defeat Jay Lethal in a match dedicated to his brother. After the match, Briscoe and Lethal hugged in the ring. Briscoe pointed up to the sky, in memory of his brother, and the whole locker room came out to celebrate with him. On February 15, it was reported Mark Briscoe officially signed with All Elite Wrestling. On the March 10 edition of AEW Rampage, Briscoe declared that new ROH Tag Team Champions would be crowned at Supercard of Honor. On the March 2, episode of Ring of Honor Wrestling, Briscoe made an appearance to answer Samoa Joe's open challenge for the ROH World Television Championship for Supercard of Honor. On March 31 at Supercard of Honor, Briscoe was unsuccessful at winning the ROH World Television Championship. Briscoe was scheduled to face Claudio Castagnoli for the ROH World Championship at Death Before Dishonor; however, Briscoe would end up being pulled from the match due to injury, being replaced by Pac. On November 18, it was announced that Briscoe would participate in the inaugural Continental Classic, where he was placed in the Gold block. Briscoe finished his block with 3 points and failed to qualify for the semi-finals.

On April 5, 2024, at Supercard of Honor, Briscoe defeated Eddie Kingston, winning the ROH World Championship for the first time. It would also coincidentally be the eleventh anniversary of Briscoe's brother Jay winning the world title.

==== The Conglomeration (2024–present) ====
In June 2024, Briscoe formed an alliance with Kyle O'Reilly, Orange Cassidy, and Willow Nightingale, known as "The Conglomeration". On the July 19 episode of Rampage, Tomohiro Ishii would join the group as well. On July 26 at Death Before Dishonor, Briscoe successfully defended his title against Roderick Strong. On September 7, 2024, at All Out, Briscoe failed to capture the AEW Continental Championship in a four-way match against Kazuchika Okada. On the October 23 episode of AEW Dynamite, Briscoe lost the ROH World Championship to Chris Jericho in a Ladder War, ending his reign at 201 days. On November 24, Briscoe was announced as a participant in the 2024 Continental Classic, where he was placed in the Blue league. Briscoe finished the tournament with 9 points, but failed to advance to the playoff stage.

On April 6, 2025, at Dynasty, Briscoe was defeated by Kyle Fletcher in the first round of the Owen Hart Cup. On May 25 at Double or Nothing, Briscoe was defeated by Ricochet in a Stretcher match. Later in the show, Briscoe appeared and assisted Kenny Omega, Swerve Strickland, Willow Nightingale, and The Opps (Samoa Joe, Powerhouse Hobbs, and Katsuyori Shibata) defeat the Death Riders (Jon Moxley, Claudio Castagnoli, Marina Shafir, and Wheeler Yuta) and The Young Bucks (Matthew Jackson and Nicholas Jackson) in the Anarchy in the Arena match. On the June 25 episode of Dynamite, Briscoe defeated Bandido, Konosuke Takeshita, and Roderick Strong in a four-way match to earn the number one spot in the men's Casino Gauntlet match at All In on July 12, but failed to win the match at the event. After All In, Briscoe began feud with MJF, which ended in victory for Briscoe at All Out on September 20 in a Tables 'n' Tacks match. On October 18 at WrestleDream, Briscoe unsuccessfully challenged Kyle Fletcher for the AEW TNT Championship. On November 12 at Blood & Guts, Briscoe teamed with Darby Allin, Kyle O'Reilly, Orange Cassidy, and Roderick Strong in a Blood and Guts match, where they defeated the Death Riders (Jon Moxley, Claudio Castagnoli, Wheeler Yuta, Daniel Garcia, and Pac).

At Full Gear on November 22, Briscoe defeated Kyle Fletcher in a No Disqualification match to win the TNT Championship, marking his first championship in AEW. After winning the title, Briscoe as presented a custom belt by Orange Cassidy on behalf of the Conglomeration, which features the same design as the standard belt, but with a snow camo strap, as snow camo ring gear is a trademark of both Briscoe and his late brother Jay. The red banner was also changed to white. This belt was made by Belts By Dan. Briscoe would successfully defend the title against Daniel Garcia, Hechicero, and El Clon, before losing to Tommaso Ciampa on the January 31, 2026 episode of Collision, ending his reign at 70 days.

In March 2026, Briscoe was taken off television due to an undisclosed injury and returned in May. After returning, Briscoe renewed his feud with MJF who was now the AEW World Champion. At Forbidden Door on June 28, Briscoe teamed with his Conglomeration stablemates, Darby Allin and Konosuke Takeshita, to defeat MJF and the Don Callis Family in a steel cage match, earning a future title match against MJF. He invoked his title opportunity on the following episode of Dynamite, but was unsuccessful in winning the championship. In July, it was announced that Briscoe had suffered another undisclosed injury and would be out indefinitely.

=== New Japan Pro-Wrestling (2016) ===
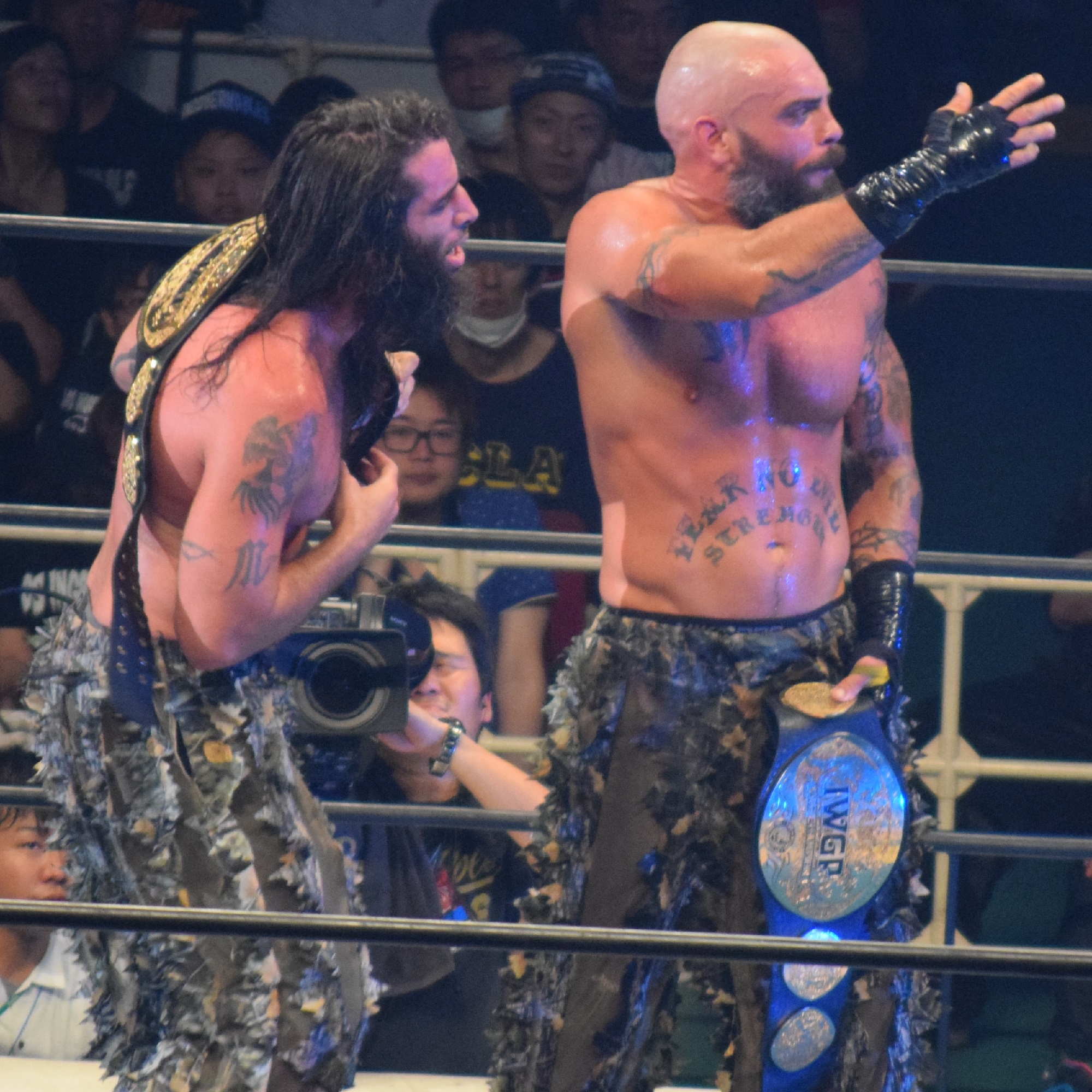
The Briscoe Brothers as the IWGP Tag Team Champions in June 2016

Through ROH's working relationship with New Japan Pro-Wrestling (NJPW), the Briscoes made their NJPW debut on January 4, 2016, at Wrestle Kingdom 10 in Tokyo Dome, where they teamed with Toru Yano to defeat Bullet Club (Bad Luck Fale, Tama Tonga and Yujiro Takahashi) to become the inaugural NEVER Openweight 6-Man Tag Team Champions. Through their affiliation with Yano, the Briscoes also became part of the Chaos stable. The three made their first successful title defense the following day against another Bullet Club trio of Fale, Matt Jackson and Nick Jackson. On February 11 at The New Beginning in Osaka, the Briscoes and Yano lost the NEVER Openweight 6-Man Tag Team Championship to Fale, Tonga and Takahashi in their second defense. The Briscoes and Yano regained the title three days later at The New Beginning in Niigata. On February 20 at Honor Rising: Japan 2016, the Briscoes and Yano lost the title to The Elite (Kenny Omega, Matt Jackson and Nick Jackson).

The Briscoes returned to NJPW on June 19 at Dominion 6.19 in Osaka-jo Hall, where they defeated Guerrillas of Destiny (Tama Tonga and Tanga Loa) to win the IWGP Tag Team Championship. They made their first successful title defense on August 14 against the Bullet Club team of Hangman Page and Yujiro Takahashi. On September 22 at Destruction in Hiroshima, The Briscoe Brothers defeated reigning IWGP Junior Heavyweight Tag Team Champions The Young Bucks for their second successful title defense. On October 10 at King of Pro-Wrestling, they lost the title back to Tonga and Loa.

=== Impact Wrestling (2022) ===
On April 1, 2022, at Multiverse of Matches, The Briscoe Brothers made their Impact Wrestling debut, losing to The Good Brothers (Doc Gallows and Karl Anderson). On May 7, 2022, they defeated Violent By Design (represented by Eric Young and Deaner) at Under Siege to win the Impact World Tag Team Championship for the first time. At Slammiversary, The Briscoe Brothers lost the titles to The Good Brothers, ending their reign at 43 days.

== Personal life ==
As of 2025, Pugh has nine children; after Jay's death, his eighth child, Matthew Jamin Pugh, was given the nickname "Baby Jay".

== Championships and accomplishments ==
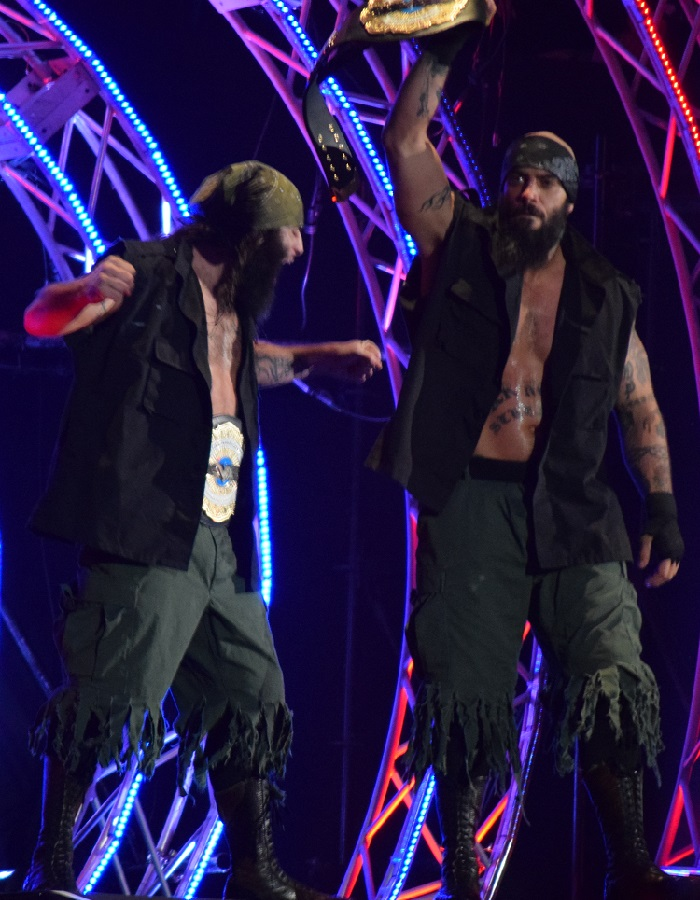
The Briscoes as two thirds of the NEVER Openweight 6-Man Tag Team Champions

- All Elite Wrestling
  - AEW TNT Championship (1 time)
- Combat Zone Wrestling
  - CZW World Tag Team Championship (2 times) – with Jay Briscoe
- Extreme Rising
  - Match of the Year (2012) with Jay Briscoe vs. The Blk Out vs. Los Dramáticos
  - Extreme Rising Moment of the Year (2012) with Jay Briscoe Debut in a Cage match against Blk Out and Los Fantásticos.
- Full Impact Pro
  - FIP Tag Team Championship (1 time) – with Jay Briscoe
- Game Changer Wrestling
  - GCW Tag Team Championship (3 times) – with Jay Briscoe
- House of Glory
  - HOG Tag Team Championship (1 time) – with Jay Briscoe
- Impact Wrestling
  - Impact World Tag Team Championship (1 time) – with Jay Briscoe
- Indie Wrestling Hall of Fame
  - Class of 2024 with Jay Briscoe
- Jersey Championship Wrestling
  - JCW Light Heavyweight Championship (1 time)
- National Wrestling Alliance
  - Crockett Cup (2022) – with Jay Briscoe
- New Japan Pro-Wrestling
  - IWGP Tag Team Championship (1 time) – with Jay Briscoe
  - NEVER Openweight 6-Man Tag Team Championship (2 times) – with Jay Briscoe and Toru Yano
- NWA Wildside
  - NWA Wildside Tag Team Championship (1 time) – with Jay Briscoe
- Pro Wrestling Illustrated
  - Inspirational Wrestler of the Year (2023)
  - Ranked No. 28 of the top 500 singles wrestlers in the PWI 500 in 2025
- Pro Wrestling Noah
  - GHC Junior Heavyweight Tag Team Championship (1 time) – with Jay Briscoe
- Pro Wrestling Unplugged
  - PWU Tag Team Championship (1 time) – with Jay Briscoe
- Real Championship Wrestling
  - RCW Tag Team Championship (1 time) – with Jay Briscoe
  - RCW Tag Team Championship Tournament (2009) – with Jay Briscoe
- Ring of Honor
  - ROH World Championship (1 time)
  - ROH World Six-Man Tag Team Championship (1 time) – with Bully Ray and Jay Briscoe
  - ROH World Tag Team Championship (13 times) – with Jay Briscoe
  - Honor Rumble (2009, (Note: Mark and his brother Jay were the co-winners of the 2009 Honor Rumble due to it using a tag team-oriented format rather than a traditional singles format.) 2013)
  - ROH Year-End Award (3 times)
    - Tag Team of the Year (2019) – with Jay Briscoe
    - Tag Team of the Decade (2010s) – with Jay Briscoe
    - Tag Team of the Year (2021) – with Jay Briscoe
  - ROH Hall of Fame (class of 2022)
- Squared Circle Wrestling
  - 2CW Tag Team Championship (1 time) – with Jay Briscoe
- USA Xtreme Wrestling
  - UXW Tag Team Championship (1 time) – with Jay Briscoe
- Wrestling Observer Newsletter awards
  - Tag Team of the Year (2007) – with Jay Briscoe
  - Feud of the Year (2022) Briscoe Brothers vs. FTR
  - Shad Gaspard/Jon Huber Memorial Award (2023) as the part of the Pugh family

== Luchas de Apuestas record ==
Winner (wager)	Loser (wager)	Location	Event	Date	Notes
Mark Briscoe (stable pledge)	Kyle Fletcher (championship)	Newark, New Jersey	Full Gear	November 22, 2025	
