= List of ROH World Champions =

Listing of professional wrestling champions for the ROH World Championship

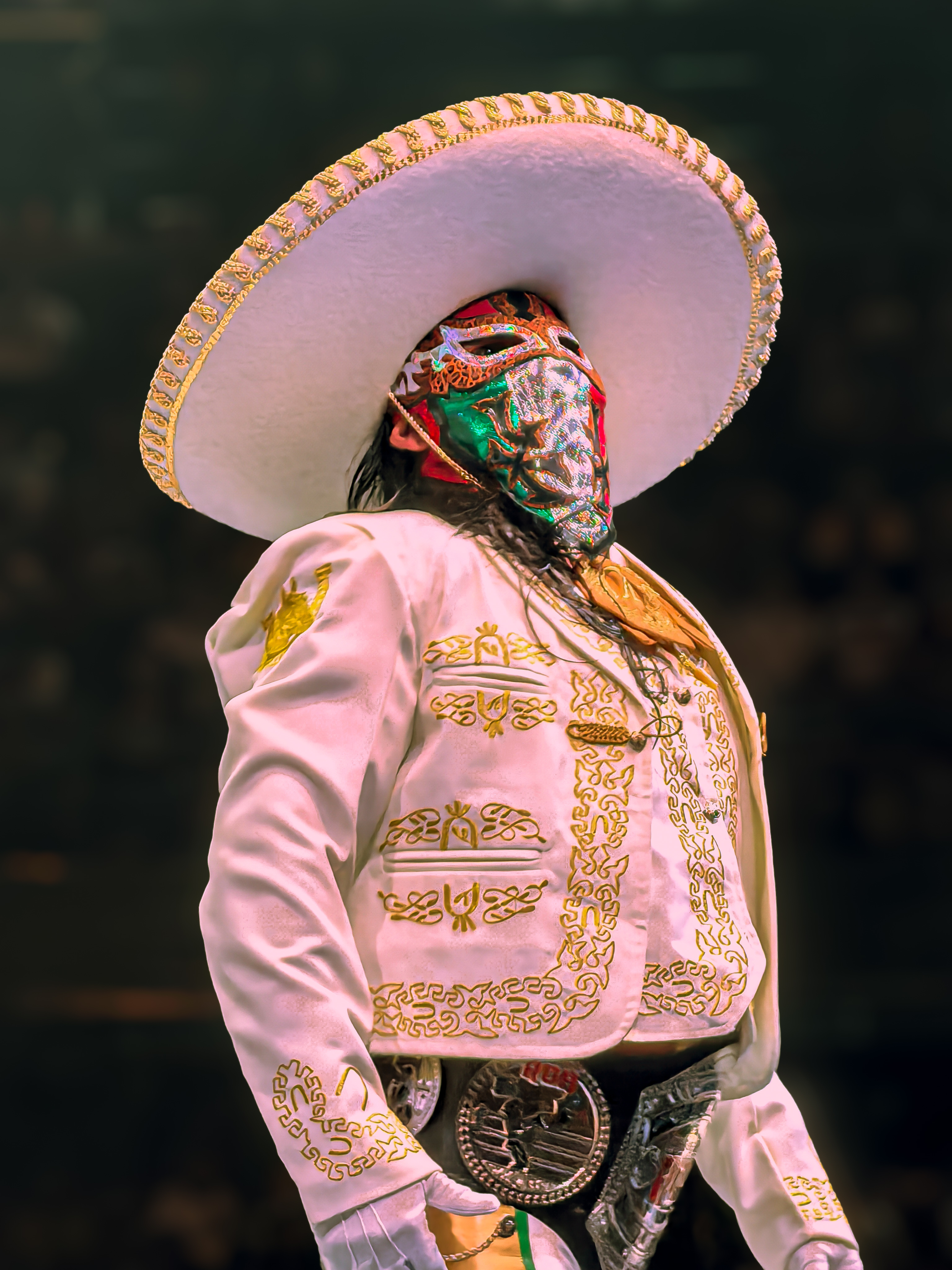
Two-time and current champion Bandido

The ROH World Championship is a professional wrestling world championship owned by the Ring of Honor (ROH) promotion. The championship was created and debuted on July 27, 2002, at ROH's Crowning a Champion event. Originally called the ROH Championship, the title was renamed to the ROH World Championship in May 2003 after the title was defended outside the United States for the first time—earlier that month, then-champion Samoa Joe had defeated The Zebra Kid in London, England, at the Frontiers of Honor event co-promoted with the Frontier Wrestling Alliance. On August 12, 2006, the ROH World Championship was unified with the ROH Pure Championship after then-champion Bryan Danielson defeated ROH Pure Champion Nigel McGuinness in Liverpool, England. The Pure Championship was deactivated after this match (though would be reactivated in 2020).

ROH World Championship reigns are determined by professional wrestling matches, in which competitors are involved in scripted rivalries. These narratives create feuds between the various competitors, which cast them as villains and heroes. Some reigns were held by champions using a ring name, while others used their real name. Reigns that were won on pay-per-view events aired on tape delay up to weeks or months apart. Reigns that were won at live events were released on DVD. The inaugural champion was Low Ki, whom ROH recognized to have become the champion after defeating Christopher Daniels, Spanky, and Doug Williams in a four-way 60-minuted Iron Man match on July 27, 2002, at ROH's Crowning a Champion event.

As of October 2026, there have been 42 reigns among 33 wrestlers with two vacancies. Adam Cole holds the record for most reigns, with three. Jay Lethal has the most defenses, with 41; Kyle O'Reilly has the least, with 0. At 645 days, Samoa Joe's reign is the longest in the title's history; Kyle O'Reilly's reign is the shortest at 33 days. Bandido is the current champion in his second reign. He defeated Chris Jericho in a Title vs. Mask match on April 6, 2025 in Philadelphia, Pennsylvania at Dynasty.

== Title history ==
=== Names ===
Name	Years
ROH Championship	June 22, 2002 – May 17, 2003
ROH World Championship	May 17, 2003 – April 1, 2022; April 1, 2022 – present
Undisputed ROH World Championship	April 1, 2022

=== Reigns ===
Key
No.	Overall reign number
Reign	Reign number for the specific champion
Days	Number of days held
Defenses	Number of successful defenses
+	Current reign is changing daily

No.	Champion	Championship change			Reign statistics			Notes	Ref.
No.	Champion	Date	Event	Location	Reign	Days	Defenses	Notes	Ref.
Ring of Honor (ROH)
1	Low Ki	July 27, 2002	Crowning a Champion	Philadelphia, PA	1	56	1	Defeated Christopher Daniels, Spanky and Doug Williams in a four-way 60-minute Iron Man match after the Block A, Block B, Block C, Block D ROH Championship tournament finals to become the inaugural champion.	
2	Xavier	September 21, 2002	Unscripted	Philadelphia, PA	1	182	4		
3	Samoa Joe	March 22, 2003	Night of Champions	Philadelphia, PA	1	645	29	After Joe defeated The Zebra Kid on May 17, 2003 in London, England, the ROH Championship was renamed the ROH World Championship.	
4	Austin Aries	December 26, 2004	Final Battle	Philadelphia, PA	1	174	17		
5	CM Punk	June 18, 2005	Death Before Dishonor III	Morristown, NJ	1	55	4		
6	James Gibson	August 12, 2005	Redemption	Dayton, OH	1	36	4	This was a four-way elimination match, also involving Christopher Daniels and Samoa Joe.	
7	Bryan Danielson	September 17, 2005	Glory by Honor IV	Lake Grove, NY	1	462	38	Danielson unified the title with the ROH Pure Championship on August 12, 2006 by defeating Nigel McGuinness in Liverpool, England.	
8	Homicide	December 23, 2006	Final Battle	New York, NY	1	56	3		
9	Takeshi Morishima	February 17, 2007	The Fifth Year Festival: Philadelphia	Philadelphia, PA	1	231	20		
10	Nigel McGuinness	October 6, 2007	Undeniable	Edison, NJ	1	545	38		
11	Jerry Lynn	April 3, 2009	Supercard of Honor IV	Houston, TX	1	71	6		
12	Austin Aries	June 13, 2009	Manhattan Mayhem III	New York, NY	2	245	13	This was a three-way elimination match, also involving Tyler Black.	
13	Tyler Black	February 13, 2010	ROH 8th Anniversary Show	New York, NY	1	210	7		
14	Roderick Strong	September 11, 2010	Glory By Honor IX	New York, NY	1	189	5	This was a no disqualification match, with Terry Funk as the ringside enforcer.	
15	Eddie Edwards	March 19, 2011	Manhattan Mayhem IV	New York, NY	1	99	3		
16	Davey Richards	June 26, 2011	Best in the World	New York, NY	1	321	11		
17	Kevin Steen	May 12, 2012	Border Wars	Toronto, ON	1	328	16		
18	Jay Briscoe	April 5, 2013	Supercard of Honor VII	New York, NY	1	89	6		
—	Vacated	July 3, 2013	—	—	—	—	—	The title was vacated by ROH Match Maker Nigel McGuinness after Jay Briscoe suffered a storyline injury at the June 23 television tapings and would not be able to compete for the foreseeable future.	
19	Adam Cole	September 20, 2013	Death Before Dishonor XI	Philadelphia, PA	1	275	13	Defeated Michael Elgin in a tournament final to win the vacant championship.	
20	Michael Elgin	June 22, 2014	Best in the World	Nashville, TN	1	76	7		
21	Jay Briscoe	September 6, 2014	All Star Extravaganza VI	Toronto, ON	2	286	13		
22	Jay Lethal	June 19, 2015	Best in the World	New York, NY	1	427	27	This was a winner takes all match, also for Lethal's ROH World Television Championship.	
23	Adam Cole	August 19, 2016	Death Before Dishonor XIV	Sunrise Manor, NV	2	105	5		
24	Kyle O'Reilly	December 2, 2016	Final Battle	New York, NY	1	33	0	This was a no disqualification match.	
25	Adam Cole	January 4, 2017	Wrestle Kingdom 11	Tokyo, Japan	3	65	3	This was a New Japan Pro-Wrestling event.	
26	Christopher Daniels	March 10, 2017	ROH 15th Anniversary Show	Sunrise Manor, NV	1	105	8		
27	Cody	June 23, 2017	Best in the World	Lowell, MA	1	175	17		
28	Dalton Castle	December 15, 2017	Final Battle	New York, NY	1	197	7		
29	Jay Lethal	June 30, 2018	Ring of Honor Wrestling	Fairfax, VA	2	280	14	This was a four-way match, also involving Cody and Matt Taven. Aired on tape delay on July 23, 2018.	
30	Matt Taven	April 6, 2019	G1 Supercard	New York, NY	1	174	11	This was a three-way ladder match, also involving Marty Scurll.	
31	Rush	September 27, 2019	Death Before Dishonor XVII	Sunrise Manor, NV	1	77	2		
32	PCO	December 13, 2019	Final Battle	Baltimore, MD	1	78	2	This was a "Friday the 13th Massacre" no disqualification match.	
33	Rush	February 29, 2020	Gateway to Honor	St. Charles, MO	2	498	3	This was a three-way match, also involving Mark Haskins.	
34	Bandido	July 11, 2021	Best in the World	Baltimore, MD	1	152	4		
—	Vacated	December 10, 2021	—	—	—	—	—	The championship was vacated after Bandido tested positive for COVID-19.	
35	Jonathan Gresham	December 11, 2021	Final Battle	Baltimore, MD	1	224	17	Defeated Jay Lethal to win the vacant championship. Former champion Bandido still had the ROH World Championship title belt, while Gresham won the original ROH World Championship title belt. Gresham defeated Bandido at Supercard of Honor XV to determine the Undisputed ROH World Champion. During this reign, Tony Khan purchased Ring of Honor.	
36	Claudio Castagnoli	July 23, 2022	Death Before Dishonor	Lowell, MA	1	60	4		
37	Chris Jericho	September 21, 2022	Dynamite: Grand Slam	Queens, NY	1	80	6	This was an All Elite Wrestling event.	
38	Claudio Castagnoli	December 10, 2022	Final Battle	Arlington, TX	2	284	10		
39	Eddie Kingston	September 20, 2023	Dynamite: Grand Slam	Queens, NY	1	198	11	This was an All Elite Wrestling event and a Winner Takes All match also for Kingston's NJPW Strong Openweight Championship. During this reign, the championship became part of the American Triple Crown Championship (also referred to as the Continental Crown), with Kingston defending the championship alongside the AEW Continental Championship and Strong Openweight Championship after winning the Continental Classic tournament at Worlds End. Kingston would lose the AEW Continental Championship to Kazuchika Okada on the March 20, 2024 episode of AEW Dynamite, thus dissolving the Triple Crown.	
40	Mark Briscoe	April 5, 2024	Supercard of Honor	Philadelphia, PA	1	201	6		
41	Chris Jericho	October 23, 2024	AEW Dynamite	Salt Lake City, UT	2	165	3	This was a Ladder War match that took place at an All Elite Wrestling event.	
42	Bandido	April 6, 2025	Dynasty	Philadelphia, PA	2	571+	14	This was a Title vs. Mask match that took place at an All Elite Wrestling event. Had Bandido lost, he would have been forced to unmask.	

== Combined reigns ==
As of October 29, 2026.

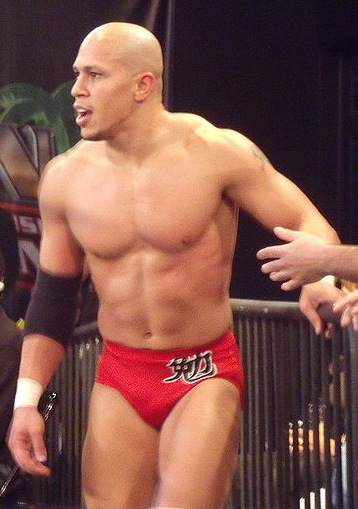
The inaugural champion Low Ki.

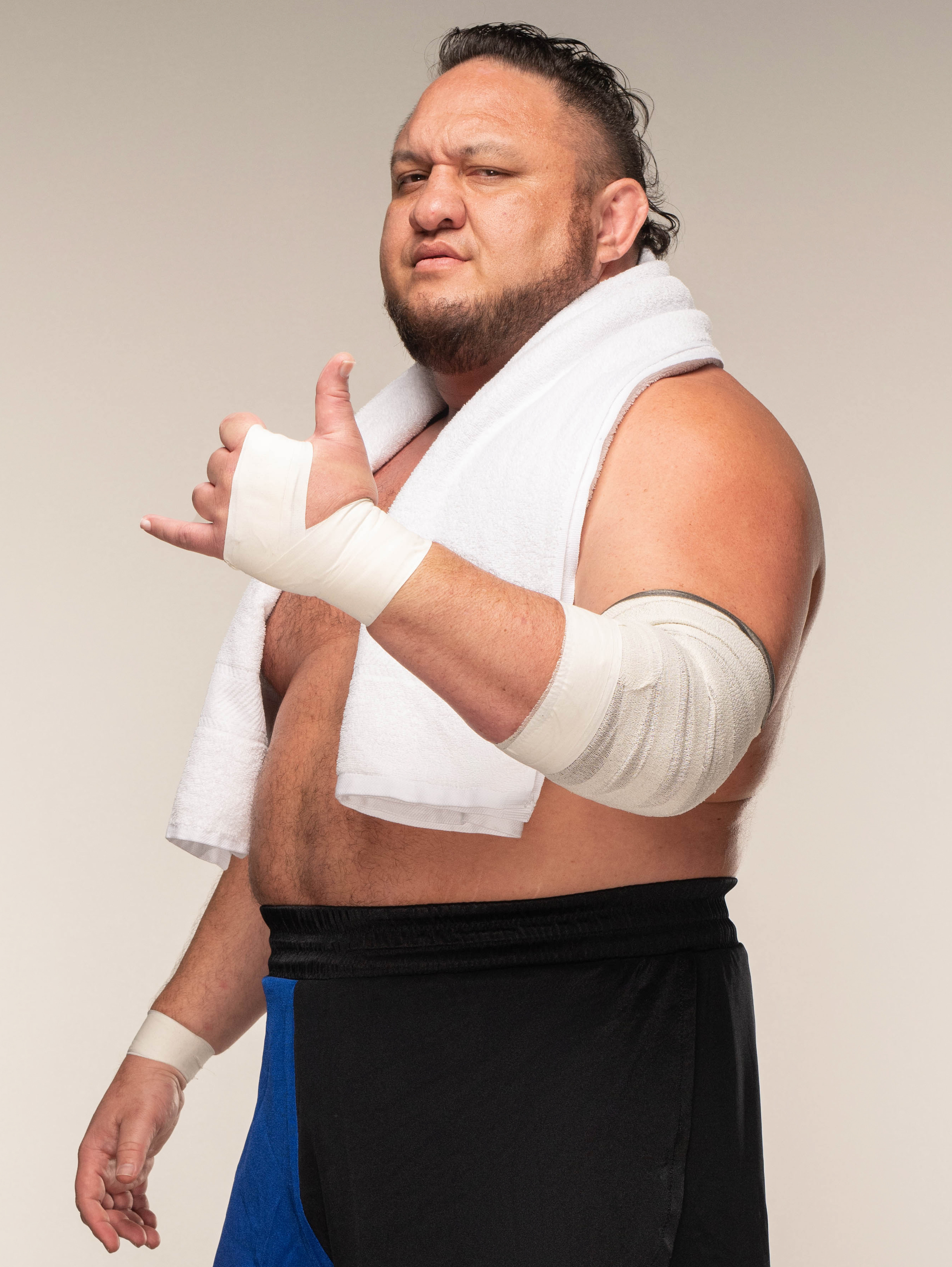
One-time and record longest reigning champion Samoa Joe

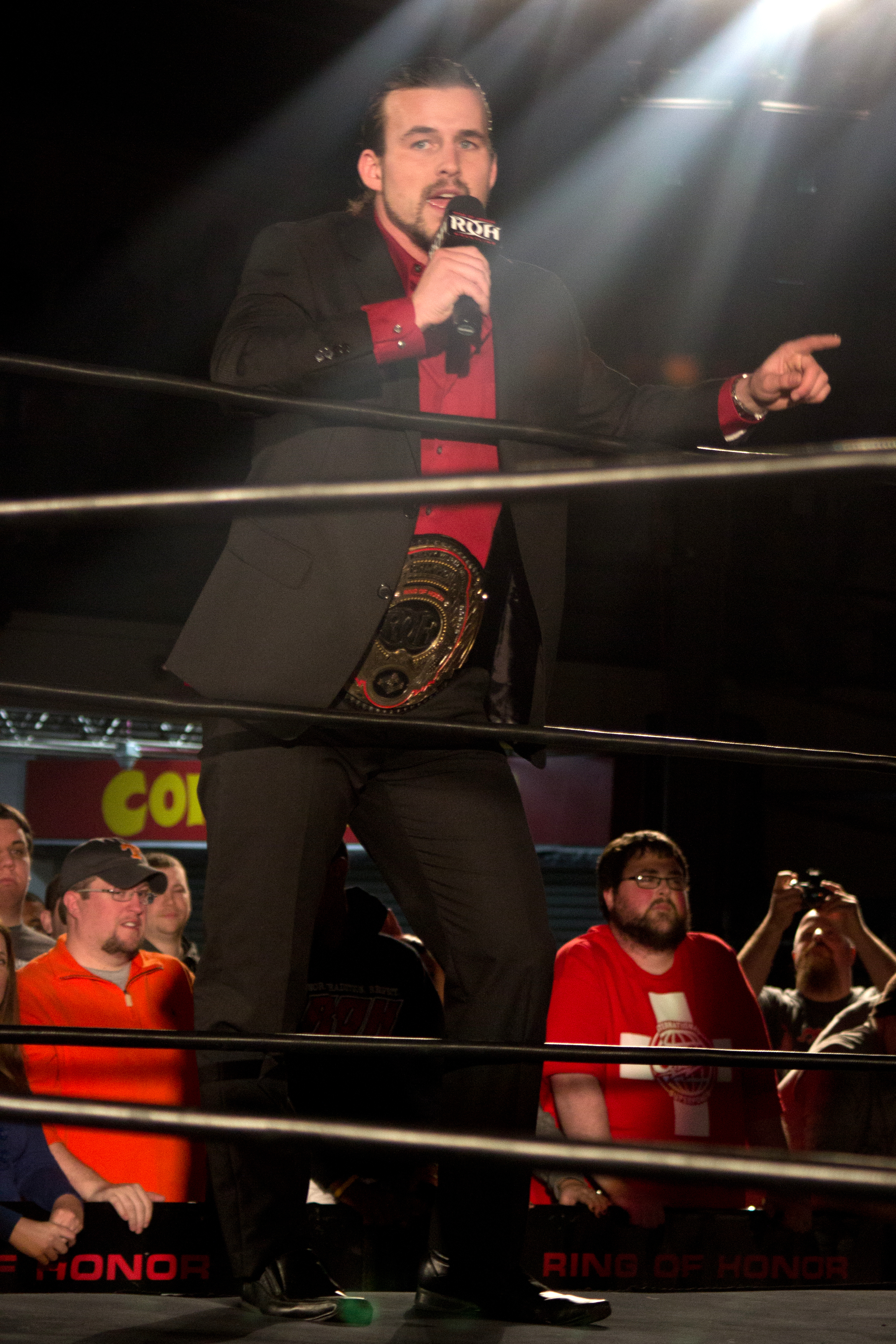
Record three-time ROH World Champion Adam Cole

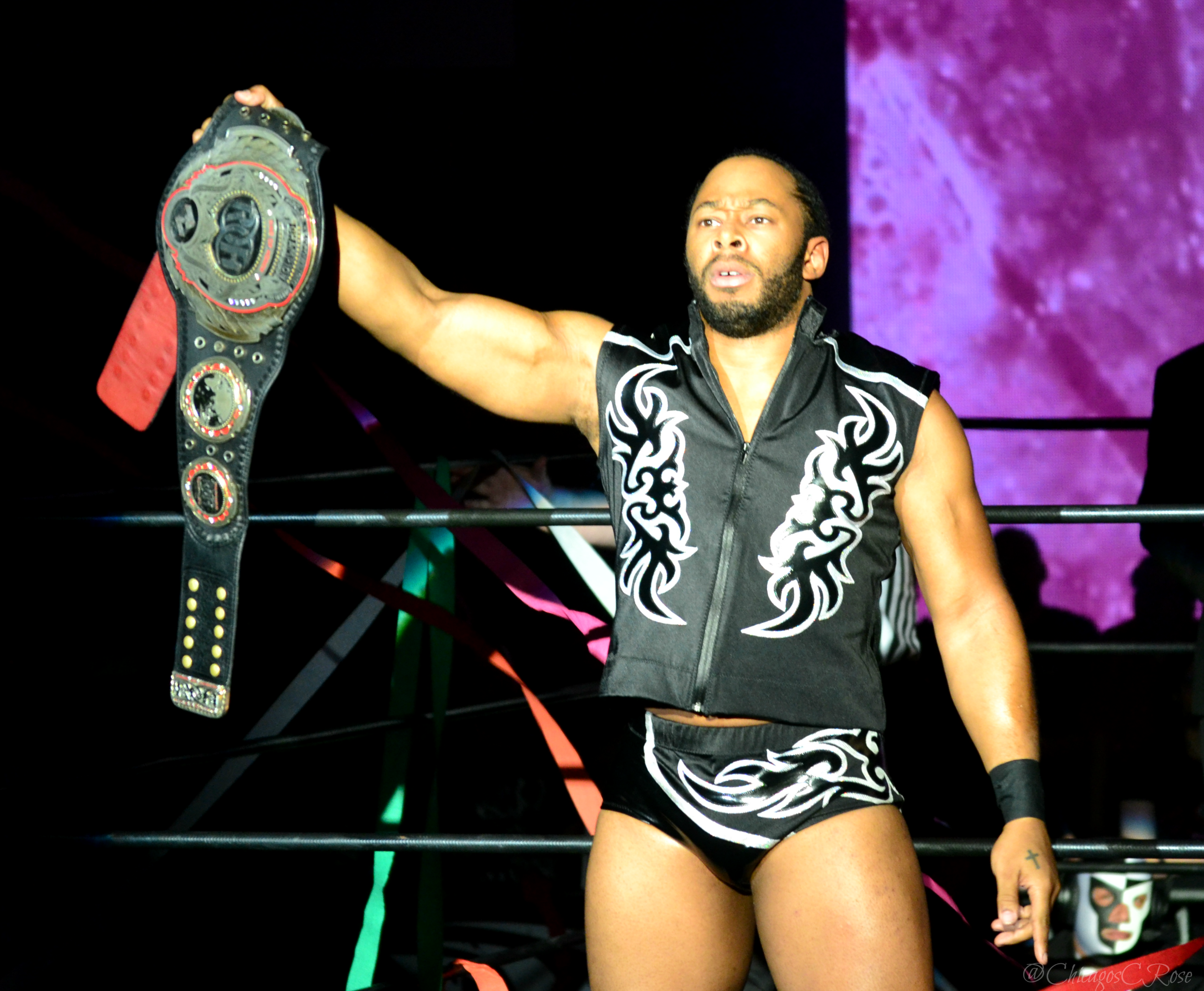
Jay Lethal, a two-time champion, holds the record for most combined defenses (41).

†	Indicates the current champion

Rank	Wrestler	No. of reigns	Combined defenses	Combined days
1	Bandido †	2	18	723+
2	Jay Lethal	2	41	707
3	Samoa Joe	1	29	645
4	Rush	2	5	575
5	Nigel McGuinness	1	38	545
6	Bryan Danielson	1	38	462
7	Adam Cole	3	21	445
8	Austin Aries	2	30	419
9	Jay Briscoe	2	19	375
10	Claudio Castagnoli	2	14	344
11	Kevin Steen	1	16	328
12	Davey Richards	1	11	321
13	Chris Jericho	2	9	245
14	Takeshi Morishima	1	20	231
15	Jonathan Gresham	1	17	224
16	Tyler Black	1	7	210
17	Mark Briscoe	1	6	201
18	Eddie Kingston	1	11	198
19	Dalton Castle	1	7	197
20	Roderick Strong	1	5	189
21	Xavier	1	4	182
22	Cody	1	17	175
23	Matt Taven	1	11	174
24	Christopher Daniels	1	8	105
25	Eddie Edwards	1	3	99
26	PCO	1	2	78
27	Michael Elgin	1	7	76
28	Jerry Lynn	1	6	71
29	Homicide	1	3	56
29	Low Ki	1	1	56
31	CM Punk	1	4	55
32	James Gibson	1	4	36
33	Kyle O'Reilly	1	0	33

== Notes ==
1. – This event was a live event that was later released on DVD.
2. – This event was a pay-per-view that later aired on tape delay.
3. – Each reign is ranked highest to lowest; reigns with the exact number mean they are tied for that certain rank.
