= Honor Takes Center Stage =

Professional wrestling pay-per-view event

- Promotional poster featuring The Kings of Wrestling (Claudio Castagnoli and Chris Hero)
- Promotion: Ring of Honor
- Date: 1 April 2011 – 2 April 2011
- City: Atlanta, Georgia
- Venue: Center Stage Theater

Pay-per-view chronology
← Previous; 9th Anniversary Show	Next → Best in the World

WrestleMania Weekend chronology
← Previous; Phoenix Rising	Next → Showdown in the Sun

Honor Takes Center Stage was a professional wrestling pay-per-view (PPV) event produced by Ring of Honor (ROH). It took place over two consecutive days, on 1 and 2 April 2011, at the Center Stage Theater in Atlanta, with the 1 April show at 8pm ET/5pm PT, and the 2 April show at a special matinee time of 1pm ET/10am PT. It was the seventh ROH event to be shown on live online pay-per-view.

== Production ==
=== Background ===
In February 2011, ROH announced during 9th Anniversary Show that their next pay-per-view would be taking place in April and would be live on Internet pay-per-view through GoFightLive.

=== Storylines ===
Other on-screen personnel
Commentators	Dave Prazak
Commentators	Kevin Kelly

The main match of the first show was Eddie Edwards' first ROH World Championship defense, against Christopher Daniels. After becoming World Champion in September 2010, Roderick Strong first defended his title in November against Daniels who lost, but won an impromptu non-title rematch in January. He was therefore granted another match for the championship at this event, with Strong as his original opponent, however at Manhattan Mayhem IV, Edwards used his Survival of the Fittest win to challenge Strong and become the new ROH World Champion. Edwards and Daniels have a long history as, in March 2010, Edwards became the first ROH World Television Champion. He held this title for 280 days, making nine title defenses until Daniels won it from him in December on the weekly Ring of Honor Wrestling program in a match that almost went to the standard 15 minute time limit of TV Title matches. Their rematch was given an extended 10 minutes and made a Two Out of Three Falls match at 9th Anniversary Show in February which ended in a 1–1 time limit draw.

The second featured championship match saw Wrestling's Greatest Tag Team (Shelton Benjamin and Charlie Haas) finally have a match for the ROH World Tag Team Championship having entered Ring of Honor the previous September. Their Glory By Honor IX debut against reigning champions The Kings of Wrestling (Chris Hero and Claudio Castagnoli) and lose in a non-title match. They returned to ROH as regulars from December onwards and defeated the Kings of Wrestling in another non-title match at SoCal Showdown II, then went on to win a contendership match against the Briscoe Brothers at 9th Anniversary Show earning them a rubber match with the Kings, this time for the ROH World Tag Team Championship. On 7 March, Wrestling's Greatest Tag Team issued a video challenge to the only major tag team in ROH they had not yet faced, the American Wolves (Davey Richards and Eddie Edwards), for a match on the second day of the event, which they soon accepted.

Roderick Strong was involved in two rematches from his World Championship reign, across the weekend. On the first event he wrestled Davey Richards, who he defended his title against at Final Battle 2010. Their match came to an abrupt end when Richards passed out after suffering a concussion and broken ear drum. Meanwhile, at SoCal Showdown II on 28 January, Strong defended his title against El Generico but had to hit Generico with the title belt to do so after Generico showed resilience against Strong.

On the second day, there was another rematch but this time a tag team contest between the Briscoe Brothers and the All Night Express (Rhett Titus and Kenny King). Going into Manhattan Mayhem IV, the Express were a villainous pair but the New York crowd did not welcome the southern Briscoes leading to a rare double-turn. Spurred on by a rowdy crowd, the match became violent with Titus becoming bloodied. After the All Night Express won the match, the two teams continued to brawl even into the locker room, where a rematch was offered and eventually accepted.

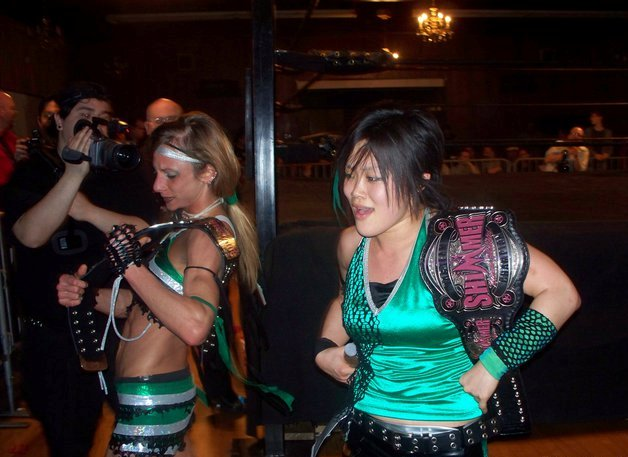
Daizee Haze and Tomoka Nakagawa after winning the Shimmer Tag Team Championship.

As part of an ongoing feud, Prince Nana's group The Embassy has been targeting Colt Cabana who disagrees with Nana using his money to exploit people. On the 24 March Videowire, Nana's barrister R.D. Evans announced they had procured the services of English wrestling veteran Dave Taylor to face Cabana on the second day of the event.

On 8 March, ROH's website announced the signing of three joshi wrestlers from the all-female Japanese promotion S-Ovation would debut over the weekend; Hiroyo Matsumoto, Ayumi Kurihara, and Tomoka Nakagawa would all wrestle after appearing at ROH's sister promotion Shimmer Women Athletes. At Final Battle 2010, Shimmer stalwart Serena Deeb teamed with Sara Del Rey to take on her enemy Daizee Haze who had picked Amazing Kong as her partner. On 28 March, ROH announced that the team of Deeb and Del Rey would wrestle Matsumoto and Kurihara on the first day of the event. On the second day, Matsumoto and Kurihara challenged Haze and Nakagawa for the Shimmer Tag Team Championship, having won them six days previously at Volume 40.

== Results ==
Chapter 1

No.	Results	Stipulations	Times
1	Michael Elgin defeated El Generico	Singles match with The House of Truth banned from ringside	09:13
2	Homicide defeated Colt Cabana, Caleb Konley (with Truth Martini), and Tommaso Ciampa (with Prince Nana, Ernesto Osiris, Princess Mia and R.D. Evans)	Four-courner survival match	09:23
3	Ayumi Kurihara and Hiroyo Matsumoto defeated Sara Del Rey and Serena Deeb	Women of Honor Tag team match	09:01
4	The Briscoe Brothers (Jay Briscoe and Mark Briscoe) defeated Adam Cole and Kyle O'Reilly	Tag team match	13:23
5	Davey Richards defeated Roderick Strong (with Truth Martini) via submission	Singles match	27:06
6	Wrestling's Greatest Tag Team (Charlie Haas and Shelton Benjamin) defeated The Kings of Wrestling (Chris Hero and Claudio Castagnoli) (c) (with Shane Hagadorn) via submission	Tag team match for the ROH World Tag Team Championship	23:00
7	Eddie Edwards (c) defeated Christopher Daniels	Singles match for the ROH World Championship	30:12
(c) / – the champion(s) heading into the match

Chapter 2

No.	Results	Stipulations	Times
1	The Kings of Wrestling (Chris Hero and Claudio Castagnoli) (with Shane Hagadorn) defeated Adam Cole and Kyle O'Reilly	Tag team match	09:17
2	Colt Cabana defeated Dave Taylor (with Prince Nana, Ernesto Osiris, Princess Mia and R.D. Evans)	Singles match	06:31
3	Tommaso Ciampa (with Prince Nana, Ernesto Osiris, Princess Mia and R.D. Evans) defeated Homicide	Singles match	09:47
4	Christopher Daniels defeated Michael Elgin (with Truth Martini)	Singles match	10:18
5	Daizee Haze and Tomoka Nakagawa (c) defeated Ayumi Kurihara and Hiroyo Matsumoto	Women of Honor Tag team match for the Shimmer Tag Team Championship	07:40
6	The Briscoe Brothers (Jay and Mark) defeated The All Night Express (Rhett Titus and Kenny King)	Tag team match	16:03
7	El Generico defeated Roderick Strong (with Truth Martini)	Singles match	16:12
8	Wrestling's Greatest Tag Team (Charlie Haas and Shelton Benjamin) defeated The American Wolves (Davey Richards and Eddie Edwards)	Tag team match	32:00
(c) / – the champion(s) heading into the match
