= Best in the World 2013 =

Professional wrestling internet pay-per-view event

Best in The World 2013
- Promotion: Ring of Honor
- Date: June 22, 2013
- City: Baltimore, Maryland
- Venue: Du Burns Arena
- Attendance: 800

Pay-per-view chronology
← Previous; Border Wars	Next → Death Before Dishonor XI

Best in the World chronology
← Previous; 2012	Next → 2014

Best in the World 2013 was a professional wrestling internet pay-per-view (iPPV) event produced by Ring of Honor (ROH). It took place on June 22, 2013, at the Du Burns Arena in Baltimore, Maryland. It was the fourth ROH Best in the World event.

== Production ==
Other on-screen personnel
Role	Name
Commentators	Nigel McGuiness
Commentators	Kevin Kelly
Commentators	Steve Corino

=== Storylines ===
Best in the World 2013 featured professional wrestling matches, which involved different wrestlers from pre-existing scripted feuds, plots, and storylines that played out on ROH's television programs. Wrestlers portrayed villains or heroes as they followed a series of events that built tension and culminated in a wrestling match or series of matches.

== Aftermath ==
Best in the World 2013 would be Ring of Honor's final live internet pay-per-view. Following the live broadcast of the event, which like many ROH iPPVs was marred by technical difficulties, Ring of Honor announced it would cease streaming live shows. Instead, all future major shows would be recorded live and then made available via the internet the following day as a Video-On-Demand (VOD).

== Results ==
No.	Results	Stipulations	Times
1	B. J. Whitmer defeated Mike Bennett (with Maria Kanellis and Bob Evans)	Singles match	09:05
2	The American Wolves (Davey Richards and Eddie Edwards) defeated Adrenaline Rush (A. C. H. and TaDarius Thomas)	Tag team match	12:49
3	Adam Cole defeated Roderick Strong via countout	Singles match	15:33
4	Michael Elgin defeated Tommaso Ciampa	Singles match	20:06
5	Matt Taven (c) (with Truth Martini) defeated Jimmy Jacobs and Jay Lethal	Three-way match for the ROH World Television Championship	11:35
6	reDRagon (Bobby Fish and Kyle O'Reilly) (c) defeated C&C Wrestle Factory (Caprice Coleman and Cedric Alexander) and S.C.U.M. (Cliff Compton and Rhett Titus)	Three-way tag team match for the ROH World Tag Team Championship	07:13
7	Matt Hardy (with Steve Corino) defeated Kevin Steen	No Disqualification match to become #1 contender to the ROH World Championship	14:13
8	Jay Briscoe (c) defeated Mark Briscoe	Singles match for the ROH World Championship	21:27
(c) / – the champion(s) heading into the match
