= Death Before Dishonor XIII =

2015 professional wrestling event

- Promotion: Ring of Honor
- Date: July 24, 2015
- City: Baltimore, Maryland
- Venue: William J Myers Pavilion
- Attendance: 900

Pay-per-view chronology
← Previous; Best In The World	Next → Field of Honor

Death Before Dishonor chronology
← Previous; XII	Next → XIV

Death Before Dishonor XIII was the thirteenth Death Before Dishonor professional wrestling event produced by Ring of Honor (ROH), which took place on July 24, 2015, at the William J Myers Pavilion in Baltimore, Maryland. Death Before Dishonor XIII was broadcast on ROH Wrestling's home page as an Internet pay-per-view.

== Production ==
Other on-screen personnel
Role	Name
Commentators	Kevin Kelly
Commentators	King Corino
Commentators	Prince Nana
Commentators	BJ Whitmer
Commentators	Adam Cole
Commentators	Nigel McGuinness

=== Storylines ===
Death Before Dishonor XIII featured professional wrestling matches, involving different wrestlers from pre-existing scripted feuds, plots, and storylines that played out on ROH's television programs. Wrestlers portrayed villains or heroes as they followed a series of events that built tension and culminated in a wrestling match or series of matches.

On June 19, at Best in the World 2015, Jay Lethal would defeat Jay Briscoe in the main event at the event to retain the ROH World Television Championship and begin his first reign as ROH World Champion. On the same night, Roderick Strong would defeat Michael Elgin and Moose making him the #1 Contender to Jay Lethal's World Championship. On July 11, Roderick Strong would come down to commentary for Mark Briscoe vs. Lethal for the ROH World Television Championship. Jay Lethal would get the win, After the match Lethal would start attacking Mark Briscoe until Jay Briscoe tried to make the save. J. Diesel and Donovan Dijak would attack Jay Briscoe when Roderick Strong would get into the ring saving both Mark and Jay Briscoe from The House of Truth. Roderick Strong announced The House of Truth (Jay Lethal, J. Diesel, Donovan Dijak, and Truth Martini) vs. Roderick Strong, The Briscoes, and ODB on ROH's 200th Episode. On July 18, The Briscoes, Roderick Strong, and ODB would defeat Jay Lethal, Donovan Dijak, J. Diesel, and Truth Martini.

On June 22, ROH announced that The Addiction (Christopher Daniels and Frankie Kazarian) would defend the ROH World Tag Team Championship against reDRagon (Bobby Fish and Kyle O'Reilly), War Machine (Hanson and Ray Rowe), and The Kingdom (Michael Bennett and Matt Taven).

On June 22, ROH announced that Cedric Alexander along with Veda Scott would battle Moose along with Stokely Hathaway, after Alexander attacked both Moose and Hathaway at Best In The World 2015. On July 11, Veda Scott would come down to the ring and announce that Moose had no chance against Cedric Alexander at the event. Veda Scott said that Ring of Honor was not about Moose anymore, and revealed Cedric Alexander as the new Face of ROH.

On June 25, it was announced on Facebook by ROH that A. C. H. would battle Adam Page at the event. The match would be set up after Page and B. J. Whitmer would defeat ACH and Matt Sydal at the Best In The World 2015 event. On the June 27 episode of ROH Wrestling, Adam Page would defeat Takaaki Watanabe after Colby Corino would attack Watanabe. ACH would look on saying that at Death Before Dishonor XIII he will get his revenge on Adam Page. On July 3, ROH announced that ACH would face Adam Page in a No Disqualification match. On July 11, Matt Sydal would defeat Adam Page after the match ACH would make the save from the attack to Sydal from Whitmer and Page. Whitmer would take down ACH, As Adam Page would lay Matt Sydal out with a Road Rage onto a pile of steel chairs.

On July 3, ROH announced The Briscoes would battle Roppongi Vice (Beretta and Rocky Romero) after both Beretta and Romero would attack Jay and Mark Briscoe at War of the Worlds '15 during The Briscoes match against Chaos (Kazuchika Okada and Shinsuke Nakamura).

On July 6, ROH announced the leader of The Kingdom Adam Cole would battle The Party Peacock Dalton Castle at the event. On the July 4th episode of ROH Wrestling Dalton Castle would defeat Takaaki Watanabe. Later that same night, The Kingdom (Adam Cole, Michael Bennett, and Matt Taven) would lose to reDRagon (Bobby Fish and Kyle O'Reilly) and Michael Elgin.

On July 4, Will Ferrara would capture a shocking win over The Last Real Man in Pro Wrestling Silas Young. On July 17, ROH announced that Silas Young would get another opportunity against Will Ferrara at the event.

On July 23, ROH announced that House of Truth member Donovan Dijak will battle Takaaki Watanabe in a singles match that will be taped exclusively for ROH's YouTube Wrestling Channel.

== Aftermath ==
On the July 25th episode of Ring of Honor, The Kingdom (Matt Taven and Michael Bennett) alongside Maria Kanellis on commentary. Michael Bennett and Matt Taven would go on to defeat two ROH's Rookies in ROH's Wrestling Boot Camp. During the match Maria Kanellis would talk about how Adam Cole isn't siding with The Kingdom. Kanellis would also issue that The Kingdom is looking for a New Superstar who can capture the ROH World Championship as Adam Cole has failed on numerous occasions.

Also on July 25, Moose along with Stokely Hathaway and Prince Nana would go on to defeat Dalton Castle, Silas Young, Brutal Bob Evans, Caprice Coleman, and Cheeseburger in a Six Man Mayhem Match. After the match Cedric Alexander and Veda Scott would stare on at Moose, Hathaway, and Nana on the stage.

In the main event of July 25, Bobby Fish would defeat ACH earning the right to face Jay Lethal for the ROH World Television Championship at ROH's next pay-per-view on September 18, 2015, in San Antonio, Texas at the All Star Extravaganza VII Pay Per View. Fish and ACH would earn the right to fight for the No. 1 Contendership to the ROH World Television Championship after both making it to the finals in an ROH World Television Championship No. 1 Contender's Tournament on their Aftershock Tour in Baltimore, Maryland

On the August 1st episode of Ring of Honor, War Machine would battle The Young Bucks (Matt and Nick Jackson) but during the match Nick Jackson would sustain an ankle injury as AJ Styles would take his place in the match. The Bullet Club would earn the win, After the match Nick Jackson, Matt Jackson, and AJ Styles would celebrate in the ring

Also, Cedric Alexander along with Veda Scott would defeat The Romantic Touch, After the match both Cedric Alexander and Veda Scott would call out Moose, Stokely Hathaway, and Prince Nana. Moose challenged Cedric Alexander to a Death Before Dishonor XIII Rematch at Field of Honor in Brooklyn, New York. Veda Scott would decline the offer as both her and Cedric Alexander would leave the ring

In the main event, Adam Cole would battle Kyle O'Reilly, Mid into the match Christopher Daniels would attack Adam Cole causing a disqualification. Kyle O'Reilly would help Cole against Daniels until Frankie Kazarian would join into the fight. Adam Cole and Kyle O'Reilly sent The Addiction out of the ring. Adam Cole would then announce that Future Shock (Adam Cole and Kyle O'Reilly) would re-unite for one night only. Adam Cole would earn the win over Christopher Daniels with a School Boy. After the match Chris Sabin would start attacking O'Reilly and Cole. Bobby Fish of reDRagon would make the save sending everyone out of the ring. O'Reilly, Fish, and Cole would stand tall as The Kingdom would come out on the stage staring down with reDRagon and Cole to end the show.

== Results ==
No.	Results	Stipulations	Times
1^{D}	Donovan Dijak (with Truth Martini) defeated Takaaki Watanabe	Singles match	5:30
2	Silas Young defeated Will Ferrara	Singles match	06:23
3	Cedric Alexander (with Veda Scott) defeated Moose (with Stokely Hathaway)	Singles match	12:04
4	The Briscoes (Jay Briscoe and Mark Briscoe) defeated Roppongi Vice (Beretta and Rocky Romero)	Tag team match	15:12
5	Adam Cole defeated Dalton Castle (with The Boys)	Singles match	14:05
6	Adam Page (with B. J. Whitmer and Colby Corino) defeated A. C. H.	No Disqualification match	17:55
7	The Addiction (Christopher Daniels and Frankie Kazarian) (c) defeated reDRagon (Bobby Fish and Kyle O'Reilly), The Kingdom (Matt Taven and Michael Bennett) (with Maria Kanellis), and War Machine (Hanson and Raymond Rowe)	Four Corner Survival tag team match for the ROH World Tag Team Championship	18:32
8	Jay Lethal (c) (with Donovan Dijak and Truth Martini) vs. Roderick Strong ended in a 60-minute time limit draw	Singles match for the ROH World Championship	60:00
(c) / – the champion(s) heading into the match; D / – this was a dark match
