= Best in the World =

Best in the World may refer to:

- The Best in the World Pack, an extended play by Drake
- IFBB Best in the World, a former IFBB professional bodybuilding competition
- ROH Best in the World, an annual professional wrestling event held by Ring of Honor
- Bryan Danielson (Daniel Bryan), professional wrestler who called himself the "Best in the World"
- CM Punk, professional wrestler who called himself the "Best in the World"
- Chris Jericho, professional wrestler who claims himself to be the "Best in the World at what I do"
- Shane McMahon, professional wrestler who is the "Best in the World" after winning the WWE World Cup at the 2018 edition of Crown Jewel
