= Best in the World (2018) =

Professional wrestling pay-per-view event

- Promotion: Ring of Honor
- Date: June 29, 2018
- City: Catonsville, Maryland
- Venue: UMBC Event Center
- Attendance: 2,500

Pay-per-view chronology
← Previous; ROH/NJPW War of the Worlds Tour	Next → Honor for All

Best in the World chronology
← Previous; 2017	Next → 2019

Best in the World (2018) was a professional wrestling pay-per-view event produced by Ring of Honor (ROH). It took place at the UMBC Event Center in Catonsville, Maryland on June 29, 2018. It was the ninth annual ROH Best in the World event. Wrestlers from New Japan Pro-Wrestling (NJPW), and Japanese women's promotion World Wonder Ring Stardom - with whom ROH has partnerships - also appeared on the card.

== Storylines ==
Best in the World featured professional wrestling matches that involved wrestlers from pre-existing scripted feuds, plots, and storylines that played out on ROH's primary television program, Ring of Honor Wrestling. Wrestlers portrayed heroes or villains as they followed a series of events that built tension and culminated in a wrestling match or series of matches.

At Final Battle, Dalton Castle defeated Cody to win the ROH World Championship. At Supercard of Honor XII Castle defeated Marty Scurll to retain the ROH World Title. At Masters of the Craft Scurll won a Defy or Deny Match (a fatal 4-way elimination match where if an opponent is eliminated by the champion that person cannot get a title shot until a new champion is crowned but if the champion is eliminated the person that eliminated him will get a future title shot) by last eliminating Castle earning him a future title shot. At Bound By Honor Scurll and Cody won an 8-man tag team elimination match with Cody last eliminating Dalton, however Cody had tagged himself in on Marty's behalf and Marty felt Cody had stolen his victory. During the ROH/NJPW War of the Worlds Tour there was obvious tension between Scurll and Cody. It was then announced via ROH's website that Castle would be defending the ROH World Title against both Cody and Marty.

At Bound By Honor, Punishment Martinez attacked Adam Page. During the ROH/NJPW War of the World Tour Page cost Martinez the IWGP United States Championship and Martinez cost Page the ROH World Television Championship. Page and Martinez were also scheduled to a match during the tour but Page attacked Martinez and the match never became official. At State of the Art: Dallas, Martinez beat Silas Young to win the TV Title. ROH then announced that Martinez will defend the title against Page at Best in the World.

== Results ==
No.	Results	Stipulations	Times
1	The Kingdom (Matt Taven, T. K. O'Ryan and Vinny Marseglia) (c) defeated Los Ingobernables de Japón (Bushi, Evil and Sanada)	Six-man tag team match for the ROH World Six-Man Tag Team Championship	11:09
2	Flip Gordon defeated Bully Ray by disqualification	Singles match	5:24
3	Sumie Sakai, Jenny Rose, Mayu Iwatani and Tenille Dashwood defeated Kelly Klein and Oedo Tai (Hazuki, Kagetsu and Hana Kimura)	Eight-woman tag team match	10:27
4	Austin Aries defeated Kenny King	Singles match	15:34
5	Jay Lethal defeated Kushida	Singles match	17:36
6	Punishment Martinez (c) defeated Adam Page	Baltimore Street Fight for the ROH World Television Championship	15:04
7	The Briscoes (Jay Briscoe and Mark Briscoe) (c) defeated The Young Bucks (Matt Jackson and Nick Jackson)	Tag team match for the ROH World Tag Team Championship	17:02
8	Dalton Castle (c) defeated Cody and Marty Scurll	Three-way match for the ROH World Championship	14:25
(c) / – the champion(s) heading into the match

== See also ==
- 2018 in professional wrestling
