= House of Truth (professional wrestling) =

Professional wrestling stable

Stable
- Name: House of Truth
- Former members: Truth Martini (leader); Jay Lethal; Joey Daddiego; Taeler Hendrix (valet); Roderick Strong; Michael Elgin; Rhino; Christin Able; Josh Raymond; Matt Taven; The Guardians of Truth; Christopher Daniels; Zach Gowen; Donovan Dijak; Seleziya Sparx (valet); Scarlett Bordeaux (valet)
- Debut: 2009
- Disbanded: 2016

The House of Truth was a professional wrestling stable, created by its leader, Truth Martini. Martini, under the character of a Life Intervention Expert, allied with various wrestlers to accompany them to their matches. The stable had existed in Ring of Honor since 2009 under different incarnations.

== Career ==
=== All American Wrestling ===
Since 2008, independent wrestlers Josh Raymond and Christin Able wrestled as tag team. However, on January 24, 2009, at AAW Path of Redemption, Truth Martini managed them, changed their name to The House of Truth. At AAW Fate of Eight Tournament, they defeated Dash Phoenix & Matt Cross to win the AAW Tag Team Championship. They ended up winning the title one more time in 2010.

=== Ring of Honor (2009-2016) ===
The House of Truth (Martini, Raymond and Able) made their debut in Ring of Honor in 2009 at Violent Tendencies as heels, facing Kevin Steen and El Generico in a losing effort. Later, Martini managed his first singles client, Roderick Strong struggled with achieving his ultimate goal but with the help of Truth Martini became the ROH World Champion at Glory By Honor IX. Martini also managed Michael Elgin. On November 12, 2010, Zach Gowen appeared at an ROH show in Detroit, where he was announced as the newest member of Truth Martini's House of Truth faction. He teamed with ROH World Champion Roderick Strong and Michael Elgin in a loss to the Briscoe Brothers and Christopher Daniels. After a tag team loss to Grizzly Redwood and Bobby Dempsey at the following day's event in Toronto, Elgin and Martini turned on Gowen and kicked him out of the House of Truth.

During his time as World Champion, Strong feuded with the Television Champion Christopher Daniels. In preparation for his World Championship match against Strong, Daniels stole "The Book of Truth" from Martini, to learn his match strategy. He was forced to shift his focus when, on March 19, Strong lost the title to Eddie Edwards. On April 2, at Honor Takes Center Stage 2, Daniels completed his heel turn by attacking El Generico with "The Book of Truth" and aligning himself with Truth Martini, Roderick Strong and Michael Elgin. On June 26, at Best in the World 2011, Daniels lost the Television title to El Generico. This was his last appearance in ROH before rejoining TNA full-time.

In April 2012, Martini enlisted the services of Rhino to become the hired muscle of the House of Truth. At Best in the World on June 24, 2012 Martini managed two masked wrestlers named The Guardians of Truth, but they lost to the Briscoe Brothers. Later on, they left ROH. During late 2012, both Michael Elgin and Roderick Strong quit the House of Truth.

In 2013 he became manager of Matt Taven and assisted him to win the ROH World Television Championship.

Scarlett Bordeaux became the first official female manager of the stable during that time period as well.

At Supercard of Honor VIII on April 4, 2014, Truth Martini helped Jay Lethal win the ROH Television Championship and became Lethal's manager then later on alongside Martini as a female recruit Seleziya Sparks also became Jay Lethal's manager but another female version replacing Bordeaux and then even further on afterwards Taeler Hendrix returned to Ring of Honor in the ROH Women of Honor division picture as a manager and replaced Seleziya Sparks in the female valet position alongside Martini and Lethal. Then, Lethal started a feud against former House of Truth member Matt Taven. Also, Martini recruit Donovan Dijak as well as J Diesel. Lethal would retain his championship against numerous acclaimed opponents for over a year before proclaiming himself "The Ring of Honor Champion" as well as "the only champion that matters in ROH", even above the ROH World Championship held by Jay Briscoe. This resulted in matchmaker Nigel McGuinness booking Lethal and Briscoe in a winner-take-all "Battle of the Belts" at Best in the World 2015 with both championships on the line. With Martini's backing, Lethal defeated Briscoe after two Lethal Injections to retain the Television Championship and win the World Championship.

On September 25, 2015, Martini would manage the debuting Taeler Hendrix in her match against Mandy Leon, coming up victorious. Later that night, Hendrix would come out with the rest of The House of Truth for their six-man tag match against War Machine (Hanson & Rowe) and Moose, making her a full-fledged member of The House of Truth. At Glory By Honor XIV on October 23, Lethal finally lost the Television Championship to former House of Truth centerpiece Roderick Strong, who joined Lethal as only the second man to capture the TV title for the second time.

On the January 13, 2016 episode of ROH TV (taped on December 19, 2015), Martini fired Donovan Dijak from the House of Truth, claiming Dijak had become a weak link and had disrespected the stable. This initially turned Dijak face in the process. On February 20, at the ROH and New Japan Pro-Wrestling (NJPW) co-produced Honor Rising: Japan 2016 event, Lethal and Martini joined forces with the Los Ingobernables de Japón stable led by Lethal's fellow Total Nonstop Action Wrestling alumnus Tetsuya Naito. On March 26 of ROH tapings, Lethal successfully defended his title against Hirooki Goto. Afterwards, a rare double-turn took place when Donovan Dijak came out with Prince Nana and attacked Truth Martini, with Lethal and Martini turning face/tweener and Dijak joining Nana as a heel.

After months of inactivity due to suffering a kayfabe neck injury, on September 17, 2016, Dave Meltzer confirmed via Twitter that Martini had left ROH, effectively disbanding the House of Truth.

== Championships and accomplishments ==
- All American Wrestling
  - AAW Tag Team Championship (2 times) – Christin Able and Josh Raymond
  - Fate of Eight (2005) – Christin Able and Josh Raymond
- Ring of Honor
  - ROH World Championship (2 times) – Roderick Strong (1) and Jay Lethal (1)
  - ROH World Television Championship (4 times) – Christopher Daniels (1), Roderick Strong (1), Matt Taven (1) and Jay Lethal (1)
