= Best in the World 2012: Hostage Crisis =

Professional wrestling pay-per-view event

- Promotional poster featuring ROH World Champion Kevin Steen
- Promotion: Ring of Honor
- Date: June 24, 2012
- City: New York, New York
- Venue: Hammerstein Ballroom
- Attendance: 1,200

Pay-per-view chronology
← Previous; Border Wars	Next → Boiling Point

Best in the World chronology
← Previous; 2011	Next → 2013

Best in the World 2012: Hostage Crisis was a professional wrestling Internet pay-per-view (iPPV) event produced by Ring of Honor (ROH) that took place on June 24, 2012, at the Hammerstein Ballroom in New York, New York.

== Production ==
Other on-screen personnel
Role	Name
Commentators	Kevin Kelly
Commentators	Nigel McGuinness

=== Storylines ===
Best in the World 2012 featured professional wrestling matches involving different wrestlers from pre-existing scripted feuds, plots, and storylines that played out on Ring of Honor's (ROH) television programs. Wrestlers portrayed villains or heroes as they followed a series of events that built tension and culminated in a wrestling match or series of matches.

== Results ==
No.	Results	Stipulations	Times
1	The Briscoe Brothers (Jay Briscoe and Mark Briscoe) defeated The Guardians of Truth (with Truth Martini)	Tag team match	06:00
2	Homicide defeated Eddie Edwards	Singles match	12:45
3	Adam Cole defeated Kyle O'Reilly by submission	Hybrid Fighting Rules match	12:38
4	Michael Elgin (with Truth Martini) defeated Fit Finlay	Singles match	19:15
5	Mike Mondo defeated Mike Bennett (with Bob Evans and Maria Kanellis)	Singles match	04:12
6	Roderick Strong (c) (with Truth Martini) defeated Jay Lethal and Tommaso Ciampa	Three-Way Elimination match for the ROH World Television Championship	13:08
7	The All Night Express (Rhett Titus and Kenny King) defeated Wrestling's Greatest Tag Team (Shelton Benjamin and Charlie Haas) (c)	Tag team match for the ROH World Tag Team Championship	22:51
8	Kevin Steen (c) (with Jimmy Jacobs) defeated Davey Richards (with Jim Cornette)	Anything Goes match for the ROH World Championship	21:23
(c) / – the champion(s) heading into the match
