= Best in the World 2011 =

Professional wrestling pay-per-view event

- Promotional poster featuring Davey Richards and ROH World Champion Eddie Edwards
- Promotion: Ring of Honor
- Date: June 26, 2011
- City: New York, New York
- Venue: Hammerstein Ballroom
- Attendance: 2,500

Pay-per-view chronology
← Previous; Honor Takes Center Stage	Next → Death Before Dishonor IX

Best in the World chronology
← Previous; 2006	Next → 2012

Best in the World 2011 was a professional wrestling pay-per-view (PPV) event by Ring of Honor (ROH) that took place on June 26, 2011. It was an afternoon show that began at 4pm and marked the return of ROH to the Hammerstein Ballroom for the first time since 2009. It was the eighth ROH event to be shown live on internet pay-per-view and is also the second Best in the World event with the first taking place in 2006. It was also the first ROH event overall to take place under Sinclair Broadcast Group's ownership of the promotion.

All three Ring of Honor championships were contested for in the evening, as well as a number of other matches that are part of storylines. The ROH World Championship was contested in a singles match between tag team partners Eddie Edwards and Davey Richards. Meanwhile, the ROH World Tag Team Championship were defended by reigning champions Wrestling's Greatest Tag Team against three other teams in an elimination match. The final championship match saw the reinstatement of the ROH World Television Championship, now that the promotion has a television deal once again; Christopher Daniels defended the title against El Generico.

== Production ==
=== Background ===
At Manhattan Mayem IV in March, it was announced that Ring of Honor would be returning to New York in June at the Hammerstein Ballroom, which has a rich wrestling legacy. On 2 May, it was confirmed that the show would be broadcast live on internet pay-per-view (iPPV), the eighth event to be shown as part of ROH's partnership with GoFightLive.tv.

=== Storylines ===
Other on-screen personnel
Commentators	Dave Prazak
Commentators	Kevin Kelly

Best in the World featured seven professional wrestling matches that involved different wrestlers from pre-existing scripted feuds and storylines. Wrestlers portrayed villains, heroes, or less distinguishable characters in the scripted events that built tension and culminated into a wrestling match or series of matches.

The main event going into the event sees reigning ROH World Champion Eddie Edwards defend his title against Davey Richards. Over the past two years Richards had wrestled four times for the World Championship but never won it, however he had held the ROH World Tag Team Championship with Edwards as part of their successful tag team the American Wolves. In the same time, Edwards had become the first Triple Crown Champion in ROH by winning the World Tag Team Championship before moving on to win the tournament to crown the first ROH Television Championship, by beating his partner Richards in the final, and eventually winning the World Championship at March's Manhattan Mayhem IV in his first attempt. After winning the championship, Richards came out to hug him, and later at Honor Takes Center Stage, authority figure Jim Cornette interviewed Richards about the possibility of a match between the two. Richards assured Cornette there was no tension between the two and he would not end Edwards' reign, but Edwards took umbrage with Richards implying Edwards would lose. Later that evening, after losing a tag team match Edwards walked out on Richards and the following month at Revolution: USA he reiterated that he was not the little brother of the pack. After his second defence at Supercard of Honor VI, Edwards was attacked by the House of Truth until Richards helped fend them off; Edwards then demanded the two wrestle to find out who is the best in the world, or else Edwards would quit Ring of Honor.

The second featured match on the card is for the ROH World Tag Team Championship. After holding the championships for just shy of a full year, The Kings of Wrestling lost the titles to Wrestling's Greatest Tag Team at Honor Takes Center Stage. At Revolution: Canada the following month, the Briscoe Brothers lost their championship match after a distraction caused by the All Night Express, with whom the Briscoes were engaged in a rivalry. Between the rivalry amongst the champions and Kings of Wrestling that started at Glory By Honor IX in September, and the Briscoes and All Night Express which resulted in a First Blood match and a Street Fight, ROH announced that all four teams would face each other in a Four-way Elimination match to determine the best tag team in ROH.

The third and final championship match of the evening is for the reactivated ROH World Television Championship, between champion Christopher Daniels and El Generico. The Television Title had been conceived while ROH had a weekly television show Ring of Honor Wrestling on HDNet, but when the show ceased airing, the championship was suspended. At the time, Daniels had put himself forward as a fighting champion but at Honor Takes Center Stage he attacked former allies El Generico and Colt Cabana who were wrestling the villainous House of Truth, with whom Daniels then associated. In February, the House of Truth had attacked Daniels and Generico helped fend them off with Daniels stealing the House of Truth's fictional guidance book, The Book of Truth. Daniels read the book in preparation for his rematch with members of the group, but seemingly became brainwashed by Truth Martini, a charismatic cult leader who manages the stable. During Revolution weekend in May, Daniels defeated Cabana but lost to Generico; although he carried his Television Championship belt with him, it was not on the line as the title had been suspended. With the news of the Sinclair Broadcast Group buying ROH, with an upcoming television show included in the deal, ROH has reactivated the Television Championship and given the first challenge to El Generico based on his win at Revolution: Canada.

The other four matches on the card were created due to a variety of different storylines, mostly involving ROH's two main factions, The Embassy and The House of Truth. These groups are led by Prince Nana and Truth Martini respectively. Jimmy Jacobs and Steve Corino were two men formerly considered the most evil wrestlers in Ring of Honor, along with Kevin Steen. However, they tried to convince ROH official Jim Cornette that they had changed their ways, and they were going to prove it by battling The House of Truth's Michael Elgin.

The Embassy was involved in two other matches on the card. The opening match featured The Embassy's Tommaso Ciampa facing Colt Cabana. Cabana, however, wasn't involved in a feud with The Embassy. During Honor Takes Center Stage, Cabana actually started a feud with The House of Truth after he was attacked by Christopher Daniels and other House of Truth members. The other match from The Embassy was between Rhino and Homicide. Homicide and The Embassy had been at ends, with Prince Nana feeling as though he needed protection against Homicide. Nana then hired former TNA wrestler "The War Machine" Rhino as his personal bodyguard. ROH then booked a match between Homicide and Rhino to be held under No Holds Barred rules.

The second match on the card featured Mike Bennett and Jay Lethal. Lethal was returning to ROH after being let go from Total Nonstop Action Wrestling.

== Reception ==
A sell-out crowd of 2,500 attended the event live at the Hammerstein Ballroom. Best in the World generated 2,100 buys, making it the most purchased ROH internet pay-per-view as of June 2011.

== Results ==
No.	Results	Stipulations	Times
1^{D}	Generation Me (Jeremy Buck and Max Buck) defeated Adam Cole and Kyle O'Reilly by disqualification	Tag team match	07:13
2	Tommaso Ciampa (with Prince Nana and Mr. Ernesto Osiris) defeated Colt Cabana	Singles match	06:59
3	Jay Lethal defeated Mike Bennett (with Bob Evans)	Singles match	09:43
4	Homicide defeated Rhino (with Prince Nana and Mr. Ernesto Osiris)	No Holds Barred match	10:16
5	Michael Elgin (with Truth Martini) defeated Steve Corino (with Jimmy Jacobs)	Singles match	08:29
6	El Generico defeated Christopher Daniels (c) (with Truth Martini)	Singles match for the ROH World Television Championship	19:30
7	Wrestling's Greatest Tag Team (Charlie Haas and Shelton Benjamin) (c) defeated The Briscoe Brothers (Jay Briscoe and Mark Briscoe), The All Night Express (Rhett Titus and Kenny King) and The Kings of Wrestling (Chris Hero and Claudio Castagnoli) (with Shane Hagadorn)	Four-way elimination tag team match for the ROH World Tag Team Championship	40:09
8	Davey Richards defeated Eddie Edwards (c)	Singles match for the ROH World Championship	36:01
(c) / – the champion(s) heading into the match; D / – this was a dark match
