= Honor for All =

Professional wrestling pay-per-view event

Honor For All
- Promotion: Ring of Honor (ROH)
- Date: July 20, 2018
- City: Nashville, Tennessee
- Venue: Nashville Municipal Auditorium
- Attendance: 800

Pay-per-view chronology
← Previous; Best in the World (2018)	Next → Death Before Dishonor XVI

Honor For All chronology
← Previous; First	Next → 2019

Honor For All was a professional wrestling pay-per-view (PPV) event produced by Ring of Honor. It took place at the Nashville Municipal Auditorium in Nashville, Tennessee on July 20, 2018.

== Production ==
This was the first ever Honor For All event in Ring of Honor (ROH) History.

Other on-screen personnel
Role:	Name:
Commentators	Joe Dombrowski
Commentators	QT Marshall
Commentators	Colt Cabana
Commentators	Ian Riccaboni
Commentators	Caprice Coleman
Commentators	Matt Taven
Commentators	Cody Rhodes

=== Storylines ===
Honor For All was a pay-per-view event that featured 10 different professional wrestling matches that involved wrestlers from pre-existing scripted feuds, plots, and storylines that played out on ROH's primary television program, Ring of Honor Wrestling. Wrestlers portrayed heroes or villains as they followed a series of events that built tension and culminated in a wrestling match or series of matches.

The pay-per-views main event was The Young Bucks (Matt Jackson & Nick Jackson) vs. The Addiction (Christopher Daniels & Frankie Kazarian) vs. The Briscoes (Jay Briscoe & Mark Briscoe) in a Triple threat Tag team match.

While the women's version of the main event was Sumie Sakai vs. Karen Q in a ROH Women of Honor Championship Proving Ground match.

== Results ==
No.	Results	Stipulations	Times
1^{D}	The Boys (Boy 1 & Boy 2) defeated The Carnies (Kerry Awful & Nick Iggy)	Tag team match	7:20
2	Punishment Martinez (c) defeated Scorpio Sky	Singles match for the ROH World Television Championship	8:32
3	Sumie Sakai (c) defeated Karen Q	ROH Women of Honor Championship Proving Ground match (Note: If Karen Q had won she would've had a match with Sumie Sakai for the Women of Honor Championship in the future.)	8:24
4	Jonathan Gresham defeated Chris Sabin and Kenny King and Shane Taylor	Four Corner Survival match	14:14
5	Chuckie T defeated Bully Ray via Disqualification	Singles match	1:19
6	Silas Young, The Beer City Bruiser and The Dawgs (Rhett Titus & Will Ferrara) defeated Cheeseburger, Eli Isom, FR Josie & Ryan Nova	Eight-man tag team match	12:13
7	Marty Scurll defeated Vinny Marseglia	Singles match	15:38
8	Cody Rhodes (with Brandi Rhodes) defeated TK O'Ryan	Singles match	11:21
9	Nick Aldis (c) defeated Flip Gordon	Singles match for the NWA Worlds Heavyweight Championship	14:32
10	The Young Bucks (Matt Jackson & Nick Jackson) defeated The Addiction (Christopher Daniels & Frankie Kazarian) and The Briscoes (Jay Briscoe & Mark Briscoe)	Triple threat Tag team match	14:35
(c) / – the champion(s) heading into the match; D / – this was a dark match

== See also ==
- 2018 in professional wrestling
