= Best in the World '16 =

Professional wrestling pay-per-view event

- Promotional poster for the event
- Promotion: Ring of Honor
- Date: June 24, 2016
- City: Concord, North Carolina
- Venue: Cabarrus Arena
- Attendance: 800

Pay-per-view chronology
← Previous; Global Wars	Next → Death Before Dishonor XIV

Best in the World chronology
← Previous; 2015	Next → 2017

Best in the World '16 was a professional wrestling pay-per-view (PPV) event produced by Ring of Honor (ROH). It took place in the Cabarrus Arena in Concord, North Carolina on June 24, 2016. It was the seventh annual ROH Best in the World event. The event saw the appearance of WCW legend Kevin Sullivan.

Eight matches took place at the event. In the main event, Jay Lethal defeated Jay Briscoe to retain the ROH World Championship in their rematch since last year's event. Other prominent matches were B. J. Whitmer defeating Steve Corino in a non-sanctioned fight without honor (originally scheduled for Final Battle 2015, but because Corino's neck surgery and Whitmer's knee injury, it took place at Best in the World '16) after the interference of Kevin Sullivan, The Addiction (Christopher Daniels & Frankie Kazarian) retaining the ROH World Tag Team Championships against The Motor City Machine Guns (Alex Shelley & Chris Sabin), the Bullet Club (The Young Bucks (Matt & Nick Jackson) & Adam Cole) defeating War Machine (Hanson & Raymond Rowe) & Moose and Mark Briscoe defeating Roderick Strong. The event marked the last PPV matches of both Steve Corino and Roderick Strong. Corino left on December 31, 2016, and Strong left on June 25, 2016, and both joined WWE.

== Production ==
=== Storylines ===
Other on-screen personnel
Role	Name
Commentators	Kevin Kelly
Commentators	Nigel McGuinness

Best in the World '16 featured professional wrestling matches that involved wrestlers from pre-existing scripted feuds, plots, and storylines that played out on ROH's primary television program, Ring of Honor Wrestling. Wrestlers portrayed heroes or villains as they followed a series of events that built tension and culminated in a wrestling match or series of matches.

== Results ==
No.	Results	Stipulations	Times
1	Kyle O'Reilly defeated Kamaitachi	Singles match	13:45
2	A. C. H. defeated Silas Young	Singles match	11:09
3	Mark Briscoe defeated Roderick Strong	Singles match	15:37
4	Bullet Club (Adam Cole, Matt Jackson and Nick Jackson) defeated War Machine (Hanson and Raymond Rowe) and Moose (with Stokely Hathaway)	Tornado Rules Six-man tag team match	12:59
5	The Addiction (Christopher Daniels and Frankie Kazarian) (c) defeated The Motor City Machine Guns (Alex Shelley and Chris Sabin)	Tag team match for the ROH World Tag Team Championship	12:11
6	B. J. Whitmer defeated Steve Corino	"The Ultimate" Non-Sanctioned Fight Without Honor	15:00
7	Bobby Fish (c) defeated Dalton Castle	Singles match for the ROH World Television Championship	16:50
8	Jay Lethal (c) (with Taeler Hendrix) defeated Jay Briscoe	Singles match for the ROH World Championship	12:55
(c) / – the champion(s) heading into the match

== See also ==
- 2016 in professional wrestling
