= Best in the World (2019) =

2019 Ring of Honor event

- Promotional poster featuring ROH wrestlers
- Promotion: Ring of Honor
- Date: Night 1: June 28, 2019; Night 2: June 29, 2019 (TV)
- City: Night 1: Baltimore, Maryland; Night 2: Philadelphia, Pennsylvania
- Venue: Night 1: UMBC Event Center; Night 2: 2300 Arena
- Attendance: Night 1: 1,200; Night 2: 600-800

Pay-per-view chronology
← Previous; Crockett Cup	Next → Death Before Dishonor XVII

Best in the World chronology
← Previous; 2018	Next → 2021

Best in the World (2019), was a two night, two city professional wrestling event produced by Ring of Honor (ROH), that took place on June 28, 2019 at UMBC Event Center in Baltimore, Maryland (PPV) and on June 29, 2019 at the 2300 Arena in Philadelphia, Pennsylvania (tapings for ROH's flagship program Ring of Honor Wrestling).

== Storylines ==
Best in the World featured professional wrestling matches that involved wrestlers from pre-existing scripted feuds, plots, and storylines that played out on ROH's primary television program, Ring of Honor Wrestling. Wrestlers portrayed heroes or villains as they followed a series of events that built tension and culminated in a wrestling match or series of matches.

== Event ==
=== Night 1 – Baltimore, MD ===
Other on-screen personnel
Role:	Name:
Commentators	Caprice Coleman
Commentators	Colt Cabana
Commentators	Ian Riccaboni
Ring announcer	Bobby Cruise
Interviewer	Quinn McKay

=== Pre-show ===
During the pre-show, Rush defeated Flip Gordon after performing the "Bull's Horns".

Eli Drake, who recently signed with NWA, made his ROH debut. He announced he's going to be Nick Aldis tag team partner, replacing the injured Colt Cabana.

=== Preliminary matches ===
The actual pay-per-view opened with Dalton Castle facing Dragon Lee. Castle won after performing Lee's finisher the "Bull's horns".

Next, The Allure (Angelina Love and Mandy Leon) (who was accompanied by Velvet Sky) faced Jenny Rose and Kelly Klein. During the match, Leon knocked Klein with a high heel show as the referee was distracted, allowing Love to hit the "Botox Injection" for the win. After the match, Maria Manic made her debut, where she appeared behind The Allure. As The Allure escaped the ring, Manic attacked the security guards.

After that, Jay Lethal faced Kenny King in a best out of three series, in which both wrestlers already scored one victory over each other. King won with the "Royal Flush", winning the best out of three series.

In the fourth match, Jonathan Gresham faced Silas Young in a Pure Rules match. Gresham submitted Young with the Octopus hold to win the match.

Next, The Briscoe Brothers (Jay Briscoe and Mark Briscoe) faced Eli Drake and Nick Aldis. The match ended in a double countout. after the match, Mark put Aldis through a table with the "Froggy Bow".

After that, Shane Taylor defended the ROH World Television Championship against Bandido. Taylor performed the "Greetings from 216" to retain the title.

In the penultimate match, the Villain Enterprises (Brody King, Marty Scurll and PCO) defended the ROH World Six-Man Tag Team Championship against Lifeblood (Mark Haskins, P. J. Black and Tracy Williams). PCO performed a diving "PCO-sault" on Black to retain the title for his team. After the match, the Soldiers of Savagery attacked Lifeblood. Bandido made the save, which until Bully Ray attacked him Gordon appeared in the ring, as Ray ran away. Scrull appeared on the screen to introduce the new member of the Villain Enterprises, Gordon. The Villain Enterprises attacked Lifeblood, which ended by Gordon performing a 450° splash, turning heel in the process.

=== Main event ===
In the main event, Matt Taven defended the ROH World Championship against Jeff Cobb. Taven performed the "Climax" to retain the title.

== Results ==
=== Night 1 (PPV) ===
No.	Results	Stipulations	Times
1^{P}	Rush defeated Flip Gordon	Singles match	10:20
2	Dalton Castle defeated Dragon Lee	Singles match	14:20
3	The Allure (Angelina Love and Mandy Leon) (with Velvet Sky) defeated Jenny Rose and Kelly Klein	Tag team match	9:30
4	Kenny King defeated Jay Lethal	Singles match	14:35
5	Jonathan Gresham defeated Silas Young by submission	Pure Rules match	17:55
6	The Briscoe Brothers (Jay Briscoe and Mark Briscoe) vs. Eli Drake and Nick Aldis ended in a double countout	Tag team match	11:00
7	Shane Taylor (c) defeated Bandido	Singles match for the ROH World Television Championship	12:40
8	Villain Enterprises (Marty Scurll, PCO and Brody King) (c) defeated Lifeblood (Mark Haskins, P. J. Black and Tracy Williams)	Six-man tag team match for the ROH World Six-Man Tag Team Championship	16:55
9	Matt Taven (c) defeated Jeff Cobb	Singles match for the ROH World Championship	9:50
(c) / – the champion(s) heading into the match; P / – the match was broadcast on the pre-show

=== Night 2 – Philadelphia, PA (TV Tapings) ===
No.	Results	Stipulations
1	Shane Taylor defeated Rhett Titus	Singles match
2	Tasha Steelz defeated Jenny Rose, Angelina Love, and Stella Grey	Four Corner Survival match
3	Jay Lethal and The Bouncers (Beer City Bruiser and Brian Milonas) defeated The Kingdom (Matt Taven, T. K. O'Ryan and Vinny Marseglia)	Six man tag team match
4	Coast to Coast (LSG and Shaheem Ali) defeated Marcus Kross and Griff Garrison	Tag Team match
5	Jonathan Gresham defeated Kenny King, Dalton Castle, and Jeff Cobb	Four Corner Survival match
6	James Storm defeated Colt Cabana (c)	Singles match for the NWA National Heavyweight Championship
7	Silas Young defeated Josh Woods	Singles match
8	Shinobi Shadow Squad (Cheeseburger, Eli Isom and Ryan Nova) defeated Brian Johnson, Joe Keys and Dante Caballero	Six man tag team match
9	Karissa Rivera defeated Sumie Sakai	Singles match
10	Rush and Dragon Lee defeated The Briscoe Brothers (Jay Briscoe and Mark Briscoe)	Tag Team match
11	Lifeblood (Bandido, Mark Haskins and Tracy Williams) defeated Villain Enterprises (Marty Scurll, PCO and Brody King)	Six man tag team match
(c) / – the champion(s) heading into the match

== See also ==
- 2019 in professional wrestling
