= Best in the World 2006 =

Professional wrestling event

Best in the World
- Promotion: Ring of Honor
- Date: March 25, 2006
- City: New York City, New York
- Venue: Basketball City
- Attendance: ~1,000

Event chronology
← Previous; Arena Warfare	Next → Dragon Gate Challenge

Best in the World chronology
← Previous; First	Next → 2011

Best in the World was a professional wrestling event promoted by Ring of Honor (ROH). The event took place on March 25, 2006. The event was held in New York City at Basketball City. It was the inaugural event held under the Best in the World name.

== Production ==
Other on-screen personnel
Role	Name
Commentators	Dave Prazak
Commentators	Lenny Leonard

=== Storylines ===
Best in the World featured twelve professional wrestling matches that involved different wrestlers from pre-existing scripted feuds and storylines. Wrestlers portrayed villains, heroes, or less distinguishable characters in the scripted events that built tension and culminated in a wrestling match or series of matches.

== Results ==
No.	Results	Stipulations	Times
1^{D}	Mitch Franklin defeated Mike Tobin	Singles match	—
2^{D}	Bobby Dempsey defeated Keenan Quinn and Shane Hagadorn and Smash Bradley	Four corner survival match	—
3	Jimmy Rave (with Prince Nana) defeated Pelle Primeau	Singles match	1:57
4	Jimmy Yang defeated Jimmy Rave (with Prince Nana)	Singles match	6:32
5	Allison Danger defeated Daizee Haze and Lacey and Mercedes Martinez	Women of Honor Four corner survival match	10:31
6	Chris Hero and Necro Butcher defeated Jason Blade and Kid Mikaze	Tag team match	0:47
7	Adam Pearce defeated Chris Hero (with Necro Butcher)	Singles match	3:10
8	Christopher Daniels (with Allison Danger) defeated Alex Shelley (with Daizee Haze and Prince Nana)	Singles match	14:33
9	Nigel McGuinness (c) defeated Claudio Castagnoli	Pure Wrestling match for the ROH Pure Championship	12:58
10	Austin Aries defeated Ricky Reyes (with Julius Smokes) by disqualification	Singles match	11:26
11	Generation Next (Jack Evans and Roderick Strong) defeated The Briscoes (Jay and Mark)	Tag team match	19:29
12	KENTA and Naomichi Marufuji defeated Samoa Joe and Bryan Danielson	Tag team match	33:34
(c) / – the champion(s) heading into the match; D / – this was a dark match

== See also ==
- 2006 in professional wrestling
