= Best in the World (2014) =

Professional wrestling pay-per-view event

- Promotion: Ring of Honor
- Date: June 22, 2014
- City: Nashville, Tennessee
- Venue: Tennessee State Fairground Sports Arena
- Attendance: 1,000+

Pay-per-view chronology
← Previous; War of the World	Next → All Star Extravaganza VI

Best in the World chronology
← Previous; 2013	Next → 2015

Best in the World was the fifth Best in the World professional wrestling pay-per-view event produced by Ring of Honor (ROH). It took place on June 22, 2014 at the Tennessee State Fairground Sports Arena in Nashville, Tennessee. This show marked the company's debut on live pay-per-view across all major cable and satellite providers. The show was also available on the internet where it was streamed live on ROH's official Ustream page for $24.95.

== Storylines ==
Seven professional wrestling matches were featured on the show that involved wrestlers from pre-existing scripted feuds, plots, and storylines played out on ROH TV. Wrestlers portrayed faces (heroes) or heels (villains) as they followed a series of events that built tension and culminated in a wrestling match or series of matches.

== Reception ==
Larry Csonka of 411mania stated that ROH held a good show, remarking that "There was a lot of good wrestling, with nothing bad, but at the same time there was nothing to really set ROH apart from the other products out there", but adding that it was "not the homerun that ROH needed.

Dave Meltzer rated the Elgin-Cole with 4 stars as the best match of the event.

== Results ==
No.	Results	Stipulations	Times
1	A. C. H. defeated TaDarius Thomas, Caprice Coleman, B. J. Whitmer, Takaaki Watanabe and Tommaso Ciampa	Six-man mayhem match for a future ROH World Television Championship match	12:07
2	Jay Lethal (c) (with Truth Martini and Seleziya Sparx) defeated Matt Taven	Singles match for the ROH World Television Championship; Truth Martini was handcuffed to the ringpost.	10:56
3	Cedric Alexander defeated Roderick Strong (with Adam Page and TaDarius Thomas)	Submission match	16:17
4	The Briscoes (Jay Briscoe and Mark Briscoe) defeated Matt Hardy and Michael Bennett (with Maria Kanellis and Nick Searcy)	No Disqualification Tag team match	17:27
5	Kevin Steen defeated Silas Young	Singles match	15:02
6	reDRagon (Bobby Fish and Kyle O'Reilly) (c) defeated Christopher Daniels and Frankie Kazarian	Tag team match for the ROH World Tag Team Championship	17:00
7	Michael Elgin defeated Adam Cole (c)	Singles match for the ROH World Championship	23:00
(c) / – the champion(s) heading into the match
