= Best in the World (2021) =

2021 Ring of Honor pay-per-view

- Promotional poster
- Promotion: Ring of Honor
- Date: July 11, 2021
- City: Baltimore, Maryland
- Venue: Chesapeake Employers Insurance Arena
- Attendance: 1,250 (paid)

Pay-per-view chronology
← Previous; ROH 19th Anniversary Show	Next → Glory By Honor XVIII

ROH Best in the World chronology
← Previous; 2019	Next → —

Best in the World (2021) was a professional wrestling event produced by American promotion Ring of Honor (ROH) that took place on Sunday, July 11, 2021 live on pay-per-view. It emanated from the Chesapeake Employers Insurance Arena (formerly known as the UMBC Event Center) in Baltimore, Maryland. It was the 11th event in the Best In The World chronology, and the first event since 2019, for the 2020 event was canceled due to the COVID-19 pandemic. It was also the first ROH event since Gateway To Honor on February 29, 2020 to have fans in attendance.

== Production ==
Other on-screen personnel
Role:	Name:
Commentators	Ian Riccaboni
Commentators	Caprice Coleman
Ring announcer	Bobby Cruise
Backstage interviewer	Denise Salcedo
Referees
Referees	Stephon Smith
Referees	Paul Turner
Referees	Mike Posey

=== Background ===
Best in the World was announced by ROH to take place on July 11 on a Sunday (as opposed to the usual Friday). Along with the pay-per-view announcement, ROH stated that fans would be allowed to attend the event, making it the first attended event for ROH in nearly a year and a half, as ROH - after taking a five-month hiatus at the start of the COVID-19 pandemic - has held empty arena TV tapings and PPV broadcasts since August 2020.

=== Storylines ===
The event featured professional wrestling matches, which involve different wrestlers from pre-existing scripted feuds, plots, and storylines that play out on ROH's television programs. Wrestlers portray villains or heroes as they follow a series of events that build tension and culminate in a wrestling match or series of matches.

At ROH 19th Anniversary Show, after La Faccion Ingobernable's Rush successfully defended the ROH World Championship against The Foundation's Jay Lethal, Brody King would come out to interrupt post-match celebrations. In tow were Tony Deppen, Chris Dickinson, and ROH legend Homicide, who began laying waste to both The Foundation (Lethal, Tracy Williams, Rhett Titus, and Jonathan Gresham) and LFI (Rush, Kenny King, Dragon Lee, and La Bestia del Ring). The four men would form a new faction in ROH called VLNCE UNLTD (Violence Unlimited). After various outside encounters between VLNCE UNLTD and The Foundation, the two factions met in an eight-man tag team match on the May 29 edition of Ring of Honor Wrestling, where King pinned Lethal to score the win for his group. On the June 1 episode of ROH Week By Week, it was announced that King and Lethal will battle in a singles match at Best in the World.

Also in the feud between the Foundation and VLNCE UNLTD, on June 12, after Tracy Williams and Rhett Titus defended the ROH World Tag Team Championship against LFI's Kenny King and Dragon Lee by disqualification after LFI ran in, VLNCE UNLTD were found on the entrance stage watching the two other factions brawl. Afterwards, Chris Dickinson and Homicide jumped Williams and Titus backstage, prompting the latter to give the former a title shot at Best in the World - not in a Pure Rules match, but a Fight Without Honor. However, Williams was involved in a real-life car accident in his hometown of Brooklyn, and so Jonathan Gresham was slotted in as his replacement.

At the 19th Anniversary Show, Dalton Castle defeated Josh Woods after Woods's tag team partner and mentor Silas Young hit Woods with a chair when Woods refused to use it on Castle. After the match, Young hovered over Woods' body, saying that he still has much to learn and that the chair shot was one of his new lessons. On the May 15 episode of Ring of Honor Wrestling, Young pinned Woods while his feet were on the ropes, which he used to break the submission hold Woods put him in. Angered that he knew Young couldn't beat him fairly, Woods challenged him to a Pure Rules Match. The match took place on June 5, with an extended 30-minute time limit, where Woods submitted Young. However, in a post-match interview, Young dropped Woods to the ground, challenging him to a Last Man Standing match at Best in the World.

On the February 20 episode of Ring of Honor Wrestling, Kenny King and Dragon Lee of LFI defeated The Briscoes (Mark Briscoe and Jay Briscoe) in a ROH World Tag Team Championship #1 contender's match, after Flip Gordon attacked Jay on behalf of Jay's rival EC3. Over a month later, on May 8, Gordon and EC3 defeated The Briscoes after Gordon punched Mark with a chain-wrapped fist, away from the referee and EC3's vision. Two weeks later, Gordon would call out ROH World Champion Rush to renew the title shot he won last February, only for EC3 to walk out and simply say to Gordon: "You Have Been Warned". On June 11, it was announced on ROH's website that EC3 and Gordon will face off at Best in the World.

At the 19th Anniversary Show, The Foundation's Tracy Williams won the ROH World Television Championship after defeating LFI's Kenny King, who competed in place of champion Dragon Lee after the latter needed surgery for a ruptured eardrum. On May 1, Williams had his first title defense against VLNCE UNLTD's Tony Deppen but lost the match and the title. On May 19, Lee and Williams got their rematch together as they faced Deppen in a three-way match for the championship. There, Deppen pinned Williams to retain, despite Lee being close enough to break it. Feeling as though Lee is the rightful #1 contender due to not being pinned, LFI challenged Deppen to a title match at Best in the World. On the June 22 edition of Week by Week, the match was official.

On the June 26 episode of Ring of Honor Wrestling, Bandido won the 2021 Survival of the Fittest tournament, last eliminating Chris Dickinson and Eli Isom consecutively in the six-man elimination match finals to earn an ROH World Championship match against reigning champion Rush at Best in the World.

On June 24 on ROH's YouTube Channel, Mike Bennett won a Pure Rules Gauntlet match by eliminating World Famous CB, Joe Keys, and lastly P. J. Black. On the June 29 edition of Week by Week, it was announced that Bennett will challenge for the ROH Pure Championship at Best in the World, facing the winner of champion Jonathan Gresham and challenger Fred Yehi - winner of the first Pure Gauntlet - that would take place on July 3. On that date, Gresham would successfully defend against Yehi, making the match Gresham vs. Bennett at the event.

On the April 24 episode of Ring of Honor Wrestling, Eli Isom and Dak Draper wrestled to a time limit draw. They were about to wrestle for five more minutes until the arena lights went out. Out came Dalton Castle, fresh off a win at the 19th Anniversary Show against Josh Woods, and with newfound flair and confidence. Wanting to "improve" on the showmanship of ROH's television program, he attempted to take Draper and Isom under his wing, before giving the two upstarts low blows as a "wake-up call". Two months later on June 12, Draper and Isom had a rematch, this time a Survival of the Fittest qualifying match. Again, Castle would come to the ring, this time before the match to scout their abilities and flashiness. Draper especially wanted to impress Castle, but his attempts - coupled with Castle leaving before the finish - allowed Isom to qualify for the finals. On ROH's YouTube channel July 1, Castle revealed that he brokered a deal with ROH World Six-Man Tag Team Champion Shane Taylor to have a title match at Best in the World where he, Draper, and Isom go against Shane Taylor Promotions (Taylor and the Soldiers of Savagery, Moses and Kaun).

The show revealed of the brackets for the tournament to crown the first ROH Women's World Champion and the championship belt itself, presented by ROH Board of Directors member Maria Kanellis-Bennett and former ROH ring announcer Lenny Leonard.

== Results ==
No.	Results	Stipulations	Times
1^{P}	Rey Horus defeated Demonic Flamita	Singles match	9:45
2^{P}	Danhausen and PCO defeated The Bouncers (Brian Milonas and Beer City Bruiser) (with Ken Dixon)	Tag team match	9:10
3	The Briscoe Brothers (Jay Briscoe and Mark Briscoe) defeated Brian Johnson and P. J. Black	Tag team match	8:10
4	EC3 defeated Flip Gordon	Singles match	11:15
5	Shane Taylor Promotions (Shane Taylor, Moses and Kaun) (c) (with O'Shay Edwards) defeated Dalton Castle, Eli Isom and Dak Draper	Six-man tag team match for the ROH World Six-Man Tag Team Championship	10:50
6	Josh Woods defeated Silas Young	Last Man Standing match	13:45
7	Brody King defeated Jay Lethal (with Tracy Williams)	Singles match	10:45
8	Jonathan Gresham (c) defeated Mike Bennett	Pure wrestling rules match for the ROH Pure Championship	19:21
9	Dragon Lee (with La Bestia del Ring) defeated Tony Deppen (c)	Singles match for the ROH World Television Championship	10:10
10	Violence Unlimited (Chris Dickinson and Homicide) defeated The Foundation (Jonathan Gresham and Rhett Titus) (c)	Fight Without Honor for the ROH World Tag Team Championship	11:45
11	Bandido defeated Rush (c)	Singles match for the ROH World Championship	16:00
(c) / – the champion(s) heading into the match; P / – the match was broadcast on the pre-show

== See also ==
- 2021 in professional wrestling
