= Death Before Dishonor XIV =

2016 professional wrestling event

- Promotion: Ring of Honor
- Date: August 19, 2016
- City: Sunrise Manor, Nevada
- Venue: Sam's Town Live

Pay-per-view chronology
← Previous; Best in the World	Next → Field of Honor

Death Before Dishonor chronology
← Previous; XIII	Next → XV

Death Before Dishonor XIV was the 14th Death Before Dishonor professional wrestling event produced by Ring of Honor (ROH), which took place on August 19, 2016, at Sam's Town Live in Sunrise Manor, Nevada. Death Before Dishonor XIV was broadcast on ROH Wrestling's home page as an Internet pay-per-view.

Several wrestlers from New Japan Pro-Wrestling (NJPW) – with which ROH has a talent exchange partnership – also appeared on the card.

== Storylines ==
Death Before Dishonor XIV featured professional wrestling matches, involving different wrestlers from pre-existing scripted feuds, plots, and storylines that played out on ROH's television programs. Wrestlers portrayed villains or heroes as they followed a series of events that built tension and culminated in a wrestling match or series of matches.

== Results ==
No.	Results	Stipulations	Times
1^{D}	Kenny King defeated Will Ferrara	Singles match	—
2^{D}	Candice LeRae defeated Veda Scott	Women of Honor Singles match	—
3	Donovan Dijak (with Prince Nana) defeated Jay White, Kamaitachi and Lio Rush	Four Corner Survival match for the #1 contendership to the ROH World Television Championship	08:10
4	Katsuyori Shibata defeated Silas Young	Singles match	09:20
5	Chaos (Beretta, Rocky Romero and Toru Yano) defeated Bullet Club (Yujiro Takahashi, Tama Tonga and Tanga Loa)	Six-man tag team match	11:17
6	Hangman Page defeated Jay Briscoe	Anything Goes match	17:40
7	Kazuchika Okada defeated Dalton Castle (with The Boys)	Singles match	13:53
8	Bobby Fish (c) defeated Mark Briscoe	Singles match for the ROH World Television Championship	16:04
9	The Addiction (Christopher Daniels and Frankie Kazarian) (c) defeated Los Ingobernables de Japón (Tetsuya Naito and Evil) and Hiroshi Tanahashi and Michael Elgin	Three-way Tag team match for the ROH World Tag Team Championship	14:48
10	Adam Cole defeated Jay Lethal (c)	Singles match for the ROH World Championship	24:00
(c) / – the champion(s) heading into the match; D / – this was a dark match

== See also ==
- 2016 in professional wrestling
