= Best in the World (2017) =

Professional wrestling pay-per-view event

- Promotion: Ring of Honor
- Date: June 23, 2017
- City: Lowell, Massachusetts
- Venue: Lowell Memorial Auditorium
- Attendance: 2,876

Pay-per-view chronology
← Previous; War of the Worlds	Next → War of the Worlds UK

Best in the World chronology
← Previous; 2016	Next → 2018

Best in the World (2017) was a professional wrestling pay-per-view event produced by Ring of Honor (ROH). It took place at the Lowell Memorial Auditorium in Lowell, Massachusetts on June 23, 2017. It was the eighth annual ROH Best in the World event.

== Storylines ==
Best in the World featured professional wrestling matches that involved wrestlers from pre-existing scripted feuds, plots, and storylines that played out on ROH's primary television program, Ring of Honor Wrestling. Wrestlers portrayed heroes or villains as they followed a series of events that built tension and culminated in a wrestling match or series of matches.

== Results ==
No.	Results	Stipulations	Times
1^{P}	Coast 2 Coast (LSG and Shaheem Ali) and Flip Gordon defeated Cheeseburger and The Tempura Boyz (Sho and Yo)	Tag team match	—
2^{P}	Kris Wolf and Sumie Sakai defeated Deonna Purrazzo and Mandy Leon	Tag team match	—
3	El Terrible and Ultimo Guerrero defeated The Kingdom (Matt Taven and Vinny Marseglia) (with T. K. O'Ryan)	Tag team match	11:10
4	Frankie Kazarian defeated Adam Page	Strap match	12:06
5	Search and Destroy (Alex Shelley, Chris Sabin, Jay White and Jonathan Gresham) defeated The Rebellion (Caprice Coleman, Kenny King, Rhett Titus and Shane Taylor)	Eight-man tag team match; Losing team must disband	12:45
6	Jay Lethal defeated Silas Young (with Beer City Bruiser)	Singles match	16:40
7	Dalton Castle and The Boys (Boy 1 and Boy 2) defeated Bully Ray and The Briscoes (Jay Briscoe and Mark Briscoe) (c)	Six-man tag team match for the ROH World Six-Man Tag Team Championship	13:45
8	Kushida (c) defeated Marty Scurll	Singles match for the ROH World Television Championship	14:54
9	The Young Bucks (Matt Jackson and Nick Jackson) (c) defeated War Machine (Hanson and Raymond Rowe) and Best Friends (Beretta and Chuckie T.)	Three-way tornado tag team match for the ROH World Tag Team Championship	12:27
10	Cody defeated Christopher Daniels (c)	Singles match for the ROH World Championship	19:18
(c) / – the champion(s) heading into the match; P / – the match was broadcast on the pre-show

== See also ==
- 2017 in professional wrestling
