= Best in the World '15 =

Professional wrestling pay-per-view event

Best in the World 2015
- Promotion: Ring of Honor
- Date: June 19, 2015
- City: New York City
- Venue: Terminal 5
- Attendance: 1,100

Pay-per-view chronology
| ← Previous; Global Wars '15 | Next → Death Before Dishonor XIII |

Best in the World chronology
| ← Previous; 2014 | Next → '16 |

Best in the World '15 was a professional wrestling pay-per-view event produced by Ring of Honor (ROH) that took place at Terminal 5 in New York City, New York on June 19, 2015. It was the sixth annual ROH Best in the World event, the first to take place on a Friday, and the second Best in the World event to be broadcast on traditional pay-per-view outlets.

== Production ==
=== Storylines ===
Other on-screen personnel
| Role | Name |
|---|---|
| Commentators | Kevin Kelly |
| Commentators | King Corino |
| Commentators | Nigel McGuinness |

Best in the World featured professional wrestling matches that involved wrestlers from pre-existing scripted feuds, plots, and storylines that played out on ROH's primary television program, Ring of Honor Wrestling. Wrestlers portrayed heroes or villains as they followed a series of events that built tension and culminated in a wrestling match or series of matches.

On May 17, it was announced that a Champion vs. Champion Match would take place in the main event as ROH World Champion Jay Briscoe would face ROH World Television Champion Jay Lethal. On May 16, The Briscoes would defeat Donovan Dijak and J. Diesel of the House of Truth. Jay Lethal would attack Jay Briscoe after the match standing tall with both championship belts. On June 13, Jay Briscoe and Jay Lethal signed the contract for the match taking place at the event.

On May 17, it was announced on ROH's website that a three-way match would take place at the event for a #1 contendership to the ROH World Championship. The match would feature Michael Elgin, Moose, and Mr. ROH Roderick Strong. The winner of the match was to face the ROH World Champion in Baltimore at Death Before Dishonor XIII. On June 13, Cedric Alexander would end Moose's undefeated streak.

On May 25, it was announced on ROH Wrestling.com that The Kingdom would face Bullet Club in a six-man tag team match at the event. The Kingdom defeated Bullet Club during the first night of Global Wars '15. During the second night, The Kingdom would face the Bullet Club's Karl Anderson and DOC Gallows, with the match ending in a double disqualification.

On May 30, ROH announced on Ring of Honor Wrestling that Mark Briscoe would battle House of Truth Member Donovan Dijak at the event. During that episode, Mark and Jay Briscoe defeated Donovan Dijak and J. Diesel in a tag match. On June 5, Mark Briscoe would accept Donovan Dijak's challenge to a match at the event.

Also on the May 30 show, ROH announced that Matt Sydal and A. C. H. would battle The Decade at the event. This followed a victory by Adam Page over ACH in a May 17 singles match, after which Page laid ACH out with a Road Rage. Over the weeks leading up to the event, B. J. Whitmer substituted himself with Colby Corino in his matches. Whitmer would make Corino face Moose and the next week Corino and Adam Page would face Hanson and Raymond Rowe.

On June 5, ROH announced on Ring of Honor Wrestling that The Addiction would defend the ROH World Tag Team Championship against reDRagon at the event after Christopher Daniels and Frankie Kazarian attacked Bobby Fish, causing Kyle O'Reilly to fight for the Tag Team Championship alone. O'Reilly would defeat The Addiction by disqualification, earning reDRagon another rematch at Best In The World 2015. On June 13, ROH announced that The Addiction would defend the ROH World Tag Team Championships against reDRagon in a No Disqualification Tag Team Match.

On June 7, ROH announced on ROHWrestling.com that "The Last Real Man In Professional Wrestling" Silas Young would take on Dalton Castle (wrestler), who stated that he was going to prove to Young that Castle was "The Last Real Man in Professional Wrestling".

On June 16, ROH announced on ROHWrestling.com that C & C Wrestle Factory would team together once again to take on Hanson and Ray Rowe at the event. Caprice Coleman would go on Twitter to bash War Machine, saying that they were "Beasts by day, Wookiees by night." On June 13, Cedric Alexander picked up momentum for C & C Wrestle Factory after ending Moose's undefeated streak.

== Aftermath ==
On May 16 at Global Wars '15, Shinsuke Nakamura defeated the #1 contender to the ROH World Championship Roderick Strong. Later on Michael Elgin who also competed in the 3-way for the #1 contendership would defeat Gedo. In the main event Bullet Club's AJ Styles and Matt Jackson and Nick Jackson would defeat Kazuchika Okada, Rocky Romero, and Baretta. After the match Adam Cole, Michael Bennett, and Matt Taven would attack Styles and The Young Bucks.

After the 3-way match for the #1 Contendership to the ROH World Championship, Cedric Alexander would attack Moose and Stokley Hathaway. Veda Scott would align herself with Alexander, saying that Moose had one chance as he lost his undefeated streak to Alexander the previous week leading into the Best In The World event.

== Results ==
| No. | Results | Stipulations | Times |
|---|---|---|---|
| 1^{P} | Cheeseburger defeated J. Diesel and The Romantic Touch and Will Ferrara | Fatal 4-way match | — |
| 2 | Mark Briscoe (with ODB) defeated Donovan Dijak (with Truth Martini) | Singles match | 08:57 |
| 3 | The Decade (B. J. Whitmer and Adam Page) (with Colby Corino) defeated Matt Sydal and A. C. H. | Tag Team match | 09:07 |
| 4 | Dalton Castle defeated Silas Young | Singles match | 11:02 |
| 5 | War Machine (Hanson and Raymond Rowe) defeated C&C Wrestle Factory (Caprice Coleman and Cedric Alexander) | Tag team match | 03:37 |
| 6 | Roderick Strong defeated Michael Elgin and Moose (with Veda Scott and Stokley Hathaway) | Three-way match for the #1 contendership to the ROH World Championship | 13:02 |
| 7 | Bullet Club (A.J. Styles, Matt Jackson and Nick Jackson) defeated The Kingdom (Adam Cole, Michael Bennett, and Matt Taven) (with Maria Kanellis) | Six-man tag team match | 14:47 |
| 8 | The Addiction (Christopher Daniels and Frankie Kazarian) (c) defeated reDRagon (Bobby Fish and Kyle O'Reilly) | No Disqualification tag team match for the ROH World Tag Team Championship | 14:50 |
| 9 | Jay Lethal (TV Champion) defeated Jay Briscoe (World Champion) | Winner Take All singles match for the ROH World and the ROH World Television Championships | 27:13 |
(c) / – the champion(s) heading into the match; P / – the match was broadcast on the pre-show
