= ROH Best in the World =

- Promotions: Ring of Honor
- First event: Best in the World 2006

Best in the World was a professional wrestling event, held annually by the Ring of Honor (ROH) promotion. The initial Best in the World event took place as a part of the "Milestone Series" in 2006. In 2011, it became an annual internet pay-per-view (iPPV) for Ring of Honor, taking place in June. In 2014, it became an annual live pay-per-view (PPV) for Ring of Honor, taking place in June.

== Dates and venues ==
Event	Date	Venue	City	Main event
Best in the World 2006	March 25, 2006	Basketball City	New York, New York	Samoa Joe and Bryan Danielson vs. KENTA and Naomichi Marufuji
Best in the World 2011	June 26, 2011	Hammerstein Ballroom	New York, New York	Eddie Edwards (c) vs. Davey Richards for the ROH World Championship
Best in the World 2012: Hostage Crisis	June 24, 2012	Hammerstein Ballroom	New York, New York	Kevin Steen (c) vs. Davey Richards in an "Anything Goes" match for the ROH World Championship
Best in the World 2013	June 22, 2013	Du Burns Arena	Baltimore, Maryland	Jay Briscoe (c) vs. Mark Briscoe for the ROH World Championship
Best in the World 2014	June 22, 2014	Tennessee State Fairground Sports Arena	Nashville, Tennessee	Adam Cole (c) vs. Michael Elgin for the ROH World Championship
Best in the World '15	June 19, 2015	Terminal 5	New York, New York	Jay Briscoe (ROH World Championship) vs. Jay Lethal (ROH World Television Championship) in a Winner Take All match
Best in the World '16	June 24, 2016	Cabarrus Arena	Concord, North Carolina	Jay Lethal (c) vs. Jay Briscoe for the ROH World Championship
Best in the World (2017)	June 23, 2017	Lowell Memorial Auditorium	Lowell, Massachusetts	Christopher Daniels (c) vs. Cody for the ROH World Championship
Best in the World (2018)	June 29, 2018	UMBC Event Center	Catonsville, Maryland	Dalton Castle (c) vs. Marty Scurll vs. Cody for the ROH World Championship
Best in the World (2019)	June 28, 2019	UMBC Event Center	Catonsville, Maryland	Matt Taven (c) vs. Jeff Cobb for the ROH World Championship
Best in the World (2021)	July 11, 2021	Chesapeake Employers Insurance Arena	Catonsville, Maryland	Rush (c) vs. Bandido for the ROH World Championship
(c) – refers to the champion(s) heading into the match

== See also ==
- ROH's annual events
