= American Wolves =

Professional wrestling tag team

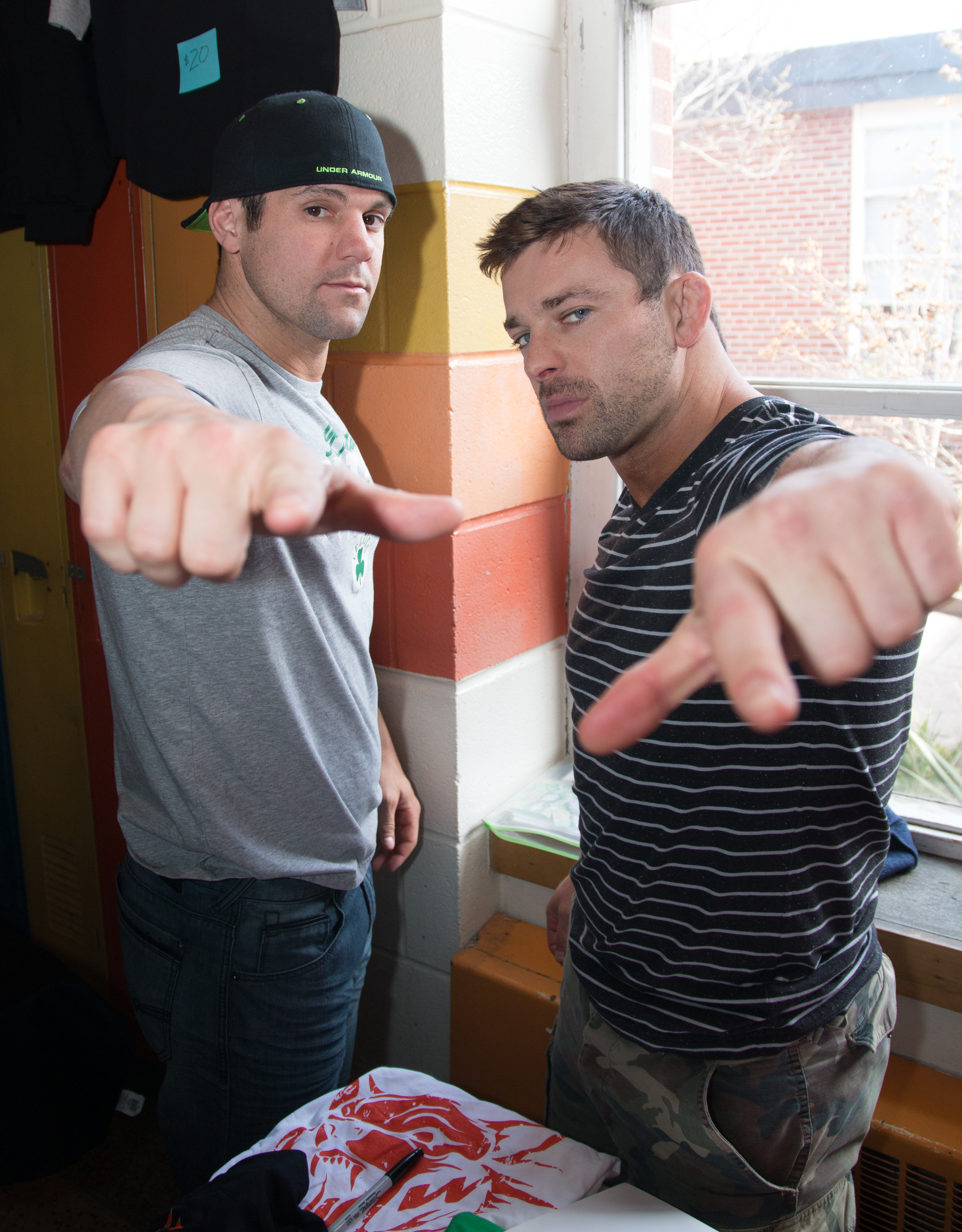
- Eddie Edwards (left) and Davey Richards (right) in April 2015

Tag team
- Members: Davey Richards; Eddie Edwards
- Name(s): American Pitbulls; American Wolves; Wolves; Sweet 'N' Sour Inc.
- Combined billed weight: 416 lb (189 kg)
- Debut: December 26, 2008
- Years active: 2008–2017; 2021–2023

The American Wolves were a professional wrestling tag team which consisted of Davey Richards and Eddie Edwards. They are seven-time world tag team champions being five-time TNA World Tag Team Champions and two-time ROH World Tag Team Champions.

The two started out as members of Larry Sweeney's alliance Sweet 'N' Sour Inc., but forged a tag team on their own. As well as being a tag team unit, the two wrestlers have had strong singles careers, with Edwards being ROH's first World Television Champion and the first to complete the Triple Crown Championship after winning the ROH World Championship, which he then went on to drop to Richards. They were originally managed by Shane Hagadorn when they portrayed villainous characters, but later abandoned him to become fan favorites. They left ROH in 2013, and debuted for TNA in January 2014, winning the TNA World Tag Team Championship a month later.

== History ==
=== Ring of Honor (2008–2013) ===
==== On the hunt (2008–2009) ====
In April 2008, Eddie Edwards joined Sweet N' Sour Inc and later in June, Davey Richards attacked his No Remorse Corps teammate Roderick Strong to join the group. Despite being part of the group, the two teamed together for the first time on September 27 in England as part of the independent wrestling supercard, Eve of Indypendence against the Briscoe Brothers. It would not be until Boxing Day that Edwards and Richards formally wrestled as the American Wolves, unveiled by Sweeney and accompanied by him, competing in a Three-Way Elimination Tag Team match at All-Star Extravaganza IV. Though they eliminated the European Union (Nigel McGuinness and Claudio Castagnoli), they lost the match after a Jay Driller from the Briscoe Brothers. The following day at ROH's annual Final Battle event they teamed with Go Shiozaki on behalf of Sweet N' Sour Inc only to lose again to Strong, Brent Albright and Erick Stevens in a Street Fight at the Hammerstein Ballroom. Later in the evening, the team attacked the Briscoe Brothers, handcuffing Jay to the ropes while attacking Mark as a storyline cover for an injury he had suffered. ROH World Tag Team Champions Kevin Steen and El Generico came to the Briscoes' aid, with Strong and Albright also helping conquer the Wolves.

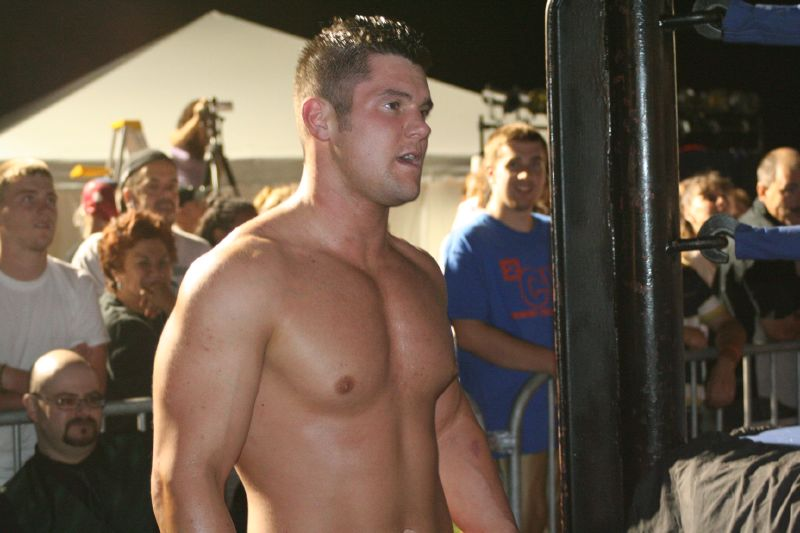
Edwards in 2008

The team picked up their first wins in January 2009, beating Strong twice with different partners, Stevens and Jay Briscoe. This earned them a match for the Tag Team Championship against Kevin Steen and El Generico in the main event of Motor City Madness. During the match Sweeney tried to attack Kevin Steen with his boot, but Albright chased him to the back and the champions retained. Two months later, accompanied by stablemate Chris Hero in a Six-Man Tag match they beat Steen and Generico who had Bobby Dempsey on their team and earned themselves another championship match at Seventh Anniversary Show. Before then, on March 14, the Wolves attacked Steen's knee at Insanity Unleashed after a title defence; Generico distracted them later in the night causing them to lose their match. On March 21 at the anniversary show, the title match was given a no-disqualification stipulation. During the match Steen sought revenge for his knee injury and attacked Richards' knee with a chair before making him submit to the Sharpshooter. After the match the Wolves, with the help of Shane Hagadorn and Sara Del Rey from Sweet N' Sour Inc, tied Steen to the ropes and attacked Generico, putting him through a table. With the rivalry escalating, the American Wolves began mocking Steen and Generico on ROH's new weekly television programme Ring of Honor Wrestling, until Steen put their manager Hagadorn through a table. This set up the show's first championship match on April 10 (airing on delay May 30), with the Wolves finally winning the ROH Tag Team Championship in a Tables Are Legal Tag Team match.

==== Tag Team Champions (2009–2010) ====
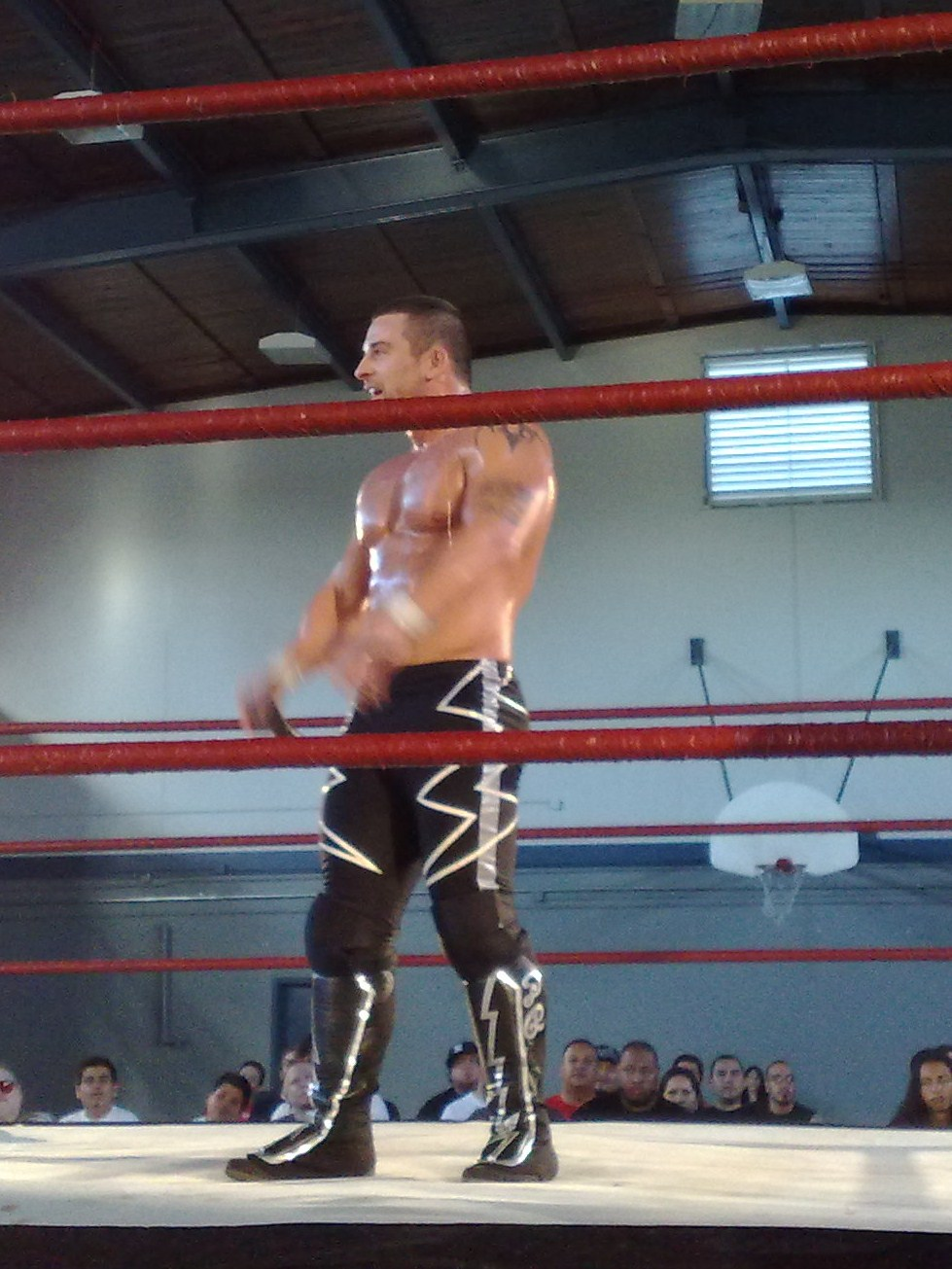
Davey Richards is seen as the alpha male of the pack

Having become the new ROH Tag Team Champions, the American Wolves made their first title defence on April 18 in a match Pro Wrestling Torch rated as the best American independent circuit match of 2009. Defending against former and future ROH World Champions Bryan Danielson and Tyler Black, respectively, the match saw the Wolves working smoothly as a team to combat Danielson and Black's individual prowess ending with the first time-limit draw in an ROH tag team match. Later that month, El Generico underwent an MRI scan that revealed he would need to take time off with a knee injury. This led to Steen choosing Jay Briscoe and later Danielson as his partners in a failed attempt to win back the championships. Finally on June 13, Generico and Steen had their rematch for the championships in a Submission match at Manhattan Mayhem III with Generico tapping out to a half-Boston Crab. Later that month Steen and Generico beat the Wolves in a Last Chance Contendership match, giving them a final chance to win back the belts at ROH's premiere event of the year Glory By Honor VIII: The Final Countdown. The night before, Edwards wrestled an Anything Goes match to Steen and broke his elbow but still defended the championship the following night. Because of the length and intensity of the rivalry, it was decided that their final match would be only the second Ladder War in Ring of Honor. During the match, Hagadorn once again handcuffed Kevin Steen to the ropes while the Wolves focused on Generico. After Generico freed Steen, tables were used along with ladders and the match ended with Edwards applying a half-Boston Crab to Generico through the ladder while Richards climbed over his partner to retrieve the belts.

With one rivalry settled, another one quickly reopened as Mark Briscoe had returned from the injury given to him at Final Battle 2008. A week before Glory By Honor VIII, the Briscoes defeated the Wolves but only by disqualification, by which titles do not change hands. Due to Edwards' broken elbow, the rematch was delayed until ROH's first live pay-per-view event, Final Battle 2009. Despite Edwards feigning a reinjured arm, the Wolves lost the match and their titles to the Briscoes, ending their 253-day reign after nine successful defences. Going into 2010, the Wolves faced The Young Bucks (Matt and Nick Jackson) on February 8 episode of Ring of Honor Wrestling for a rematch against the Briscoes but lost. Through their manager, Shane Hagadorn, they teamed with The Kings of Wrestling (Chris Hero and Claudio Castagnoli) who he also managed, to defeat the Briscoe Brothers and The Young Bucks at SoCal Showdown. They went on to have a championship match with the Briscoes in the main event of From The Ashes, which they lost.

==== Individual World Champions (2010–2012) ====
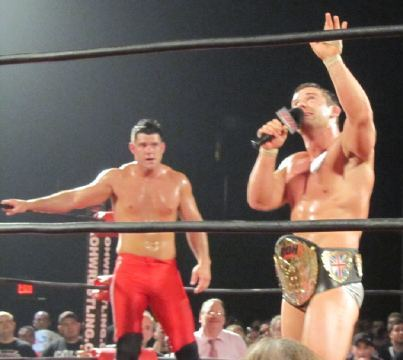
Davey Richards after winning the ROH World Championship from Eddie Edwards

After this, the two wrestlers began to compete more as solo wrestlers, emphasised by both men entering the tournament for ROH's newly created ROH World Television Championship for their Ring of Honor Wrestling show. Both Richards and Edwards made it through the three-round tournament and into the final against each other, with Edwards defeating Richards to become the inaugural champion. Richards, meanwhile, earned himself into contendership for the ROH World Championship by entering the Pick 6 rankings with a win at April's The Big Bang! PPV. He used this championship opportunity at the next PPV in July, Death Before Dishonor VIII during which Hagadorn tried to attack his opponent with a chair but Richards declined his help and sent him to the back. Once again, on August 16 episode of Ring of Honor Wrestling, Richards refused Hagadorn's help in a contendership match for Roderick Strong's World Title opportunity and lost while dealing with his manager. Tension mounted through the rest of the year on Ring of Honor Wrestling, with Hagadorn taking responsibility for Richards' previous success and trying to control who Edwards defended his World Television Championship against. This led to an in-ring confrontation on November 1 where Richards started attacking Hagadorn only to have the Kings of Wrestling save him before Edwards joined in the fray. This led to a rivalry between the Wolves and the Kings of Wrestling, exacerbated at the 2010 Survival of the Fittest tournament, where Edwards defeated Hero in the qualifying match, but dislocated his shoulder in the process. Due to this injury he was taken to the back in the final round; after Castagnoli eliminated three wrestlers, Edwards returned and helped Kenny King eliminate Castagnoli before eliminating King himself to win the competition and a future ROH World Championship match. On March 19, 2011, at Manhattan Mayhem IV, Edwards defeated defending champion Roderick Strong to win the ROH World Championship for the first time. On June 26, 2011, at Best in the World 2011, Richards defeated Edwards to win his first ROH World Championship.

==== Reunion (2012–2013) ====
The American Wolves reunited on December 16, 2012, at Final Battle 2012: Doomsday, where they defeated Bobby Fish and Kyle O'Reilly in a tag team match. Following their win, the American Wolves received a shot at the ROH World Tag Team Championship, but were defeated by the defending champions, the Briscoe Brothers, on January 18, 2013. At All Star Extravaganza V the American Wolves defeated the Forever Hooligans (Alex Koslov and Rocky Romero) to win the ROH World Tag Team Championship for the second time. They lost the title to reDRagon (Bobby Fish and Kyle O'Reilly) on August 17. On September 20 at Death Before Dishonor XI, the American Wolves unsuccessfully challenged the Forever Hooligans for New Japan Pro-Wrestling's IWGP Junior Heavyweight Tag Team Championship. The American Wolves' run in ROH came to an end on November 30, when Richards announced he had parted ways with the promotion.

=== Other promotions (2009–2014) ===
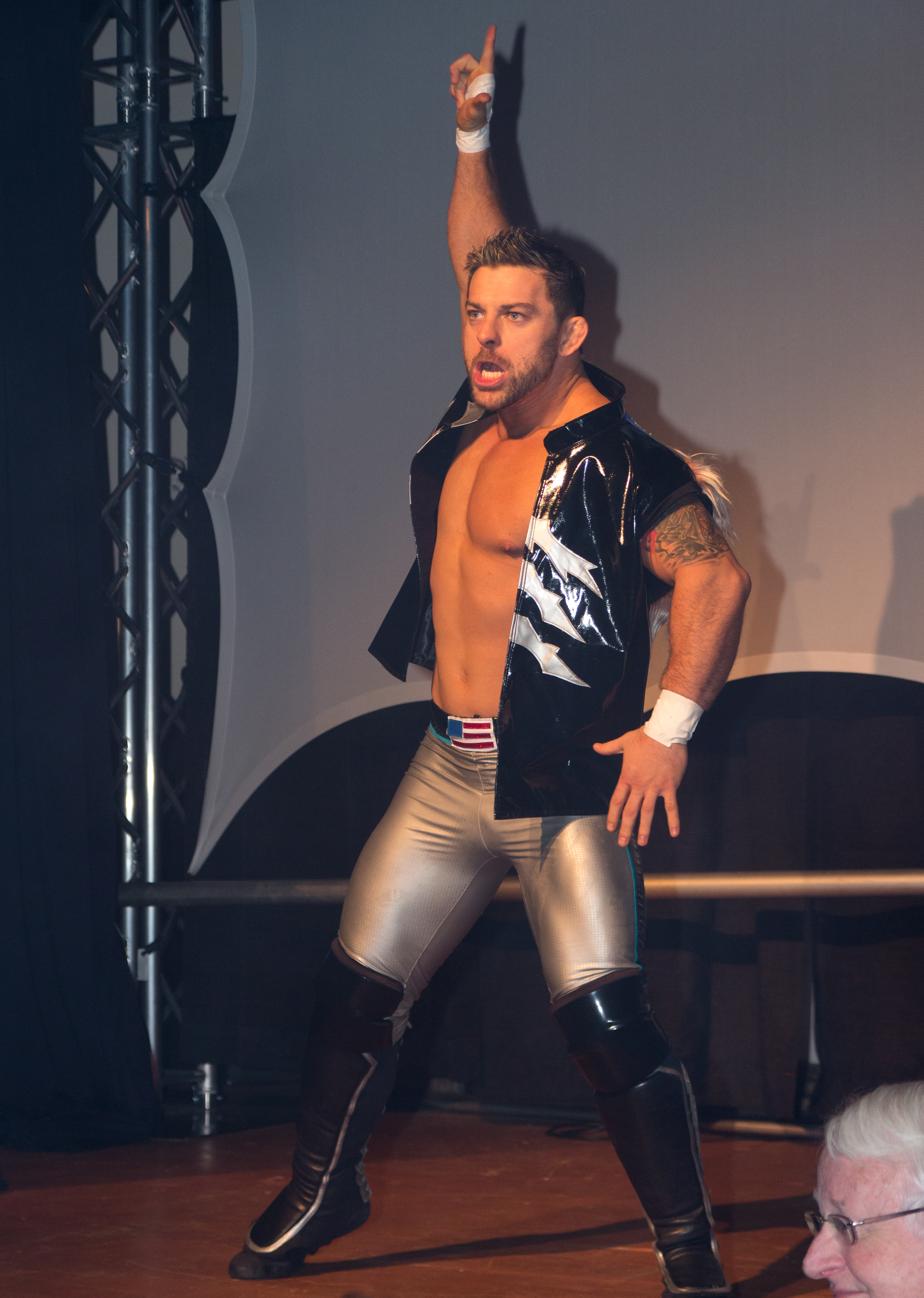
Richards in Squared Circle Wrestling

After being awarded Wrestling Observer's Tag Team of the Year award for 2009, other promotions sought out the Wolves in 2010. In March, German promotion Westside Xtreme Wrestling (wXw) held an event in Philadelphia and the Wolves were given a match for the wXw World Tag Team Championship. They lost to reigning champions The Switchblade Conspiracy (Jon Moxley and Sami Callihan).

They were also invited to Squared Circle Wrestling (2CW) on April 2 to compete for the 2CW Tag Team Championship. At Living On The Edge they defeated the incumbent champions, Up In Smoke (Cheech and Cloudy) to start their reign. After holding the championship for four months, at Live or Let Die on August 22, they lost the championship to The Olsen Twins (Colin Delaney and Jimmy Olsen).

On January 1, 2011, The American Wolves came to Insanity Pro Wrestling (IPW) for Showdown In Naptown to face the Irish Airborne team of Dave and Jake Crist. Although they lost the match, Richards congratulated Irish Airborne on the victory, and invited them to ROH for a rematch.

The following month, Pro Wrestling Guerrilla (PWG) announced that Edwards would make his debut for the promotion as part of the DDT4 tournament on March 4. In the first round of the tag team tournament the Wolves defeated the RockNES Monsters (Johnny Goodtime and Johnny Yuma), before losing in the semifinals of the tournament to eventual winners The Young Bucks.

On November 18, 2013, Edwards and Richards began a week-long tryout with WWE at the WWE Performance Center in Orlando, Florida. Three days later, they made their NXT debut, losing to NXT Tag Team Champions The Ascension (Konnor and Viktor) in a non-title match, while billed as "The American Pitbulls" of Derek Billington (Richards) and John Cahill (Edwards).

On November 7, 2014, at AAW A Monster's Rage, The American Wolves made their All American Wrestling debuts as a team defeating Chris Sabin and Michael Elgin. Later that month on November 29, they returned to AAW losing to Ethan Page and Josh Alexander.

=== Total Nonstop Action Wrestling / Impact Wrestling (2014–2017) ===
==== World Tag Team Championship reigns (2014–2016) ====
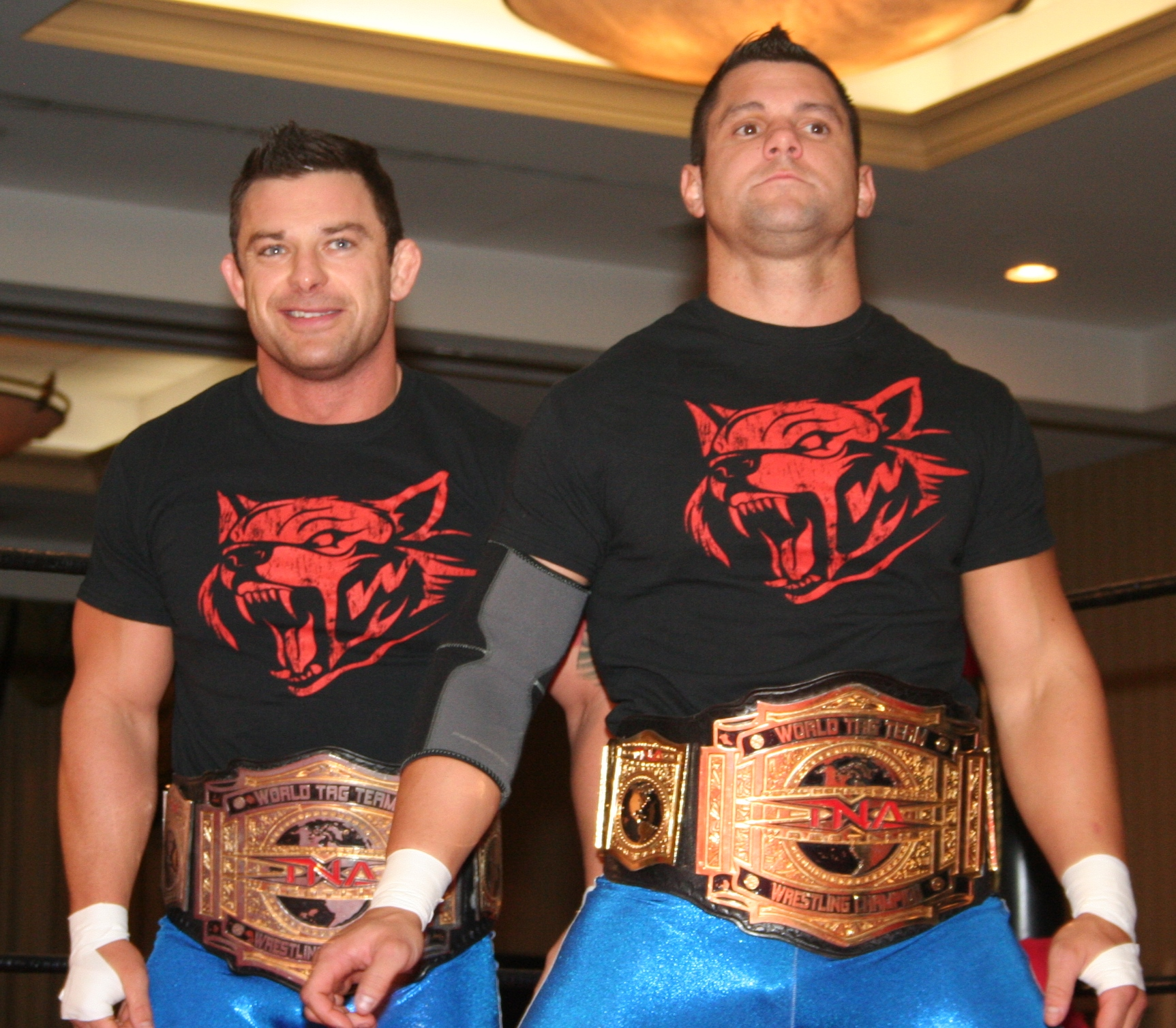
Edwards (right) and Richards as the TNA World Tag Team Champions during their second reign in August 2014

On January 16, 2014, Edwards and Richards appeared in the first week of Genesis special of Impact Wrestling as The Wolves. As part of their debut storyline, they revealed they had signed contracts with a new investor in TNA in a backstage segment with Dixie Carter; the investor was later revealed to be MVP. The Wolves made their in-ring debut in a six-man tag team match, teaming with Samoa Joe to defeat The BroMans (Jessie Godderz and Robbie E) and Zema Ion. On February 23, The Wolves won the TNA World Tag Team Championship for the first time by defeating The BroMans. After a week-long reign, The Wolves lost the championship back to The BroMans at Wrestle-1's Kaisen: Outbreak event in Tokyo, Japan in a three-way match, which also included Team 246 (Kaz Hayashi and Shuji Kondo). On April 27 at the Sacrifice pay-per-view, The Wolves regained the championship by defeating Robbie E, Godderz, and DJ Z in a two-on-three handicap match. On June 15, 2014, at Slammiversary XII, The Wolves competed in a six-way ladder match for TNA X Division Championship, which was won by Sanada. On June 26, 2014, at Destination X, The Wolves defeated The Hardys to retain the TNA World Tag Team Championships. The Wolves returned to Wrestle-1 on July 6, successfully defending the TNA World Tag Team Championship against the Junior Stars (Koji Kanemoto and Minoru Tanaka), At the Impact Wrestling tapings on September 19, Edwards and Richards lost the championship to The Revolution (James Storm and Abyss), but regained the title from the pairing on January 30, 2015. After Edwards suffered a broken heel in February 2015, The Wolves vacated the championship on March 13.

On their return, The Wolves faced Dirty Heels to a Best of 5 Series matches for the Tag Team Championships. The Wolves won the first 2 matches and Dirty Heels won the next two. At Slammiversary, Aries defeated Richards, so he choose the stipulation for the last match of the series, a 30 minutes tag team iron man match. On June 25, 2015 (aired July 1) The Wolves defeated Dirty Heels to win the Tag Team Titles. With this victory, The Wolves shared with Beer Money the record of most reigns, with four. They lost the title to Brian Myers and Trevor Lee on July 28, 2015, tapings of Impact Wrestling (aired September 2) only to regain it the next week on September 9 episode of Impact Wrestling, becoming a five time TNA World Tag Team Champions. At Bound for Glory, The Wolves retained their tag team championship in the rematch against Brian Myers and Trevor Lee. During October and November (taped in July), Both Edwards and Richards participated in the TNA World Title Series as one of the Group Tag Team Specialists, where Richards and Edwards faced each other in the match which resulted a time limit draw with the two partners receiving 1 point. meanwhile Richards faced Matt Hardy only into the losing effort while Edwards was unsuccessful in qualifying of other matches and didn't make it to the round of 16. However, Richards himself receive 4 points by defeating Robbie E to advance the round of 16 when he defeated Bram and then however he did not make it to semifinals when he was later defeated by Ethan Carter III and was therefore eliminated from the tournament afterwards. At One Night Only Live. The Wolves defended their world tag titles in the Three-way tag team match against Kurt Angle and Drew Galloway and Eli Drake and Jessie Godderz which saw the Wolves retained the titles. On the January 26 edition of Impact Wrestling, The Wolves was attacked by the newest stable called The Decay consisting of Abyss, Crazzy Steve and the debuting Rosemary and stole the titles. however he retained the titles from them on the February 2 episode of Impact Wrestling, the following week, The Wolves continue the feud and challenge them to a hardcore Monster's Ball match which was won by the Decay. On the March 8 episode of Impact Wrestling, The Wolves dropped the titles to Beer Money, Inc. (James Storm and Bobby Roode).

==== Feud (2016–2017) ====
In March, Richards suffered an ACL injury and Edwards started his singles run by feuding with TNA X Division Champion Trevor Lee. In July at Destination X, Richards was seen on a TNA broadcast for the first time in months, when he joined Edwards at ringside in a run-in with TNA World Heavyweight Champion Lashley in the build-up to their match later that evening. Richards confirmed on the broadcast that he was there to support Edwards in his landmark match, although was still "A way off being in a condition to compete." Eddie's match resulted in a no-contest when Mike Bennett interfered in the match flooring the referee and then invited new signee to TNA, Moose to the ring, who had a confrontation with Lashley.

On January 5, 2017, Richards made his return to TNA, helping Edwards retain the TNA World Heavyweight Championship, by stopping Lashley from hitting Edwards with the title. Richards faced Lashley on January 6, 2017, at One Night Only: Live in a losing effort. On the February 9 episode of Impact Wrestling, Richards turned heel by costing Edwards' his TNA World Heavyweight Championship rematch against Lashley. Afterwards, Richards and his wife Angelina Love attacked Edwards and his wife Alisha Edwards, thus ending The Wolves in the process. Richards' character then went through a complete transformation, sporting new theme music, trunks, being infatuated with Love and calling himself "The Lone Wolf". On the February 16 episode of Impact Wrestling, Richards faced Edwards in a Street Fight, however the match ended in a no-contest. On the March 9 episode of Impact Wrestling, Richards brawled with Edwards at the beginning of the show, but the two were separated by security guards. On the April 6 episode of Impact Wrestling, Richards defeated Edwards in a Last Man Standing Match. At Slammiversary XV, Eddie Edwards and Alisha Edwards defeated Davey Richards and Angelina Love in a Full Metal Mayhem match, ending the feud. This would be the final major program in Richards' career, as he announced his departure from TNA in July and then a hiatus from wrestling altogether in November to focus on studying to become a doctor.

=== Reunion (2021–2023) ===
On October 30, 2021, Davey Richards and Eddie Edwards reunited as The American Wolves at the Tales From The Ring event produced by The Wrestling Revolver, where they defeated Infrared (Logan James and Tyler Matrix) to win the PWR Tag Team Championship. At Ric Flair's Last Match, The Wolves lost to the Motor City Machine Guns.

== Championships and accomplishments ==
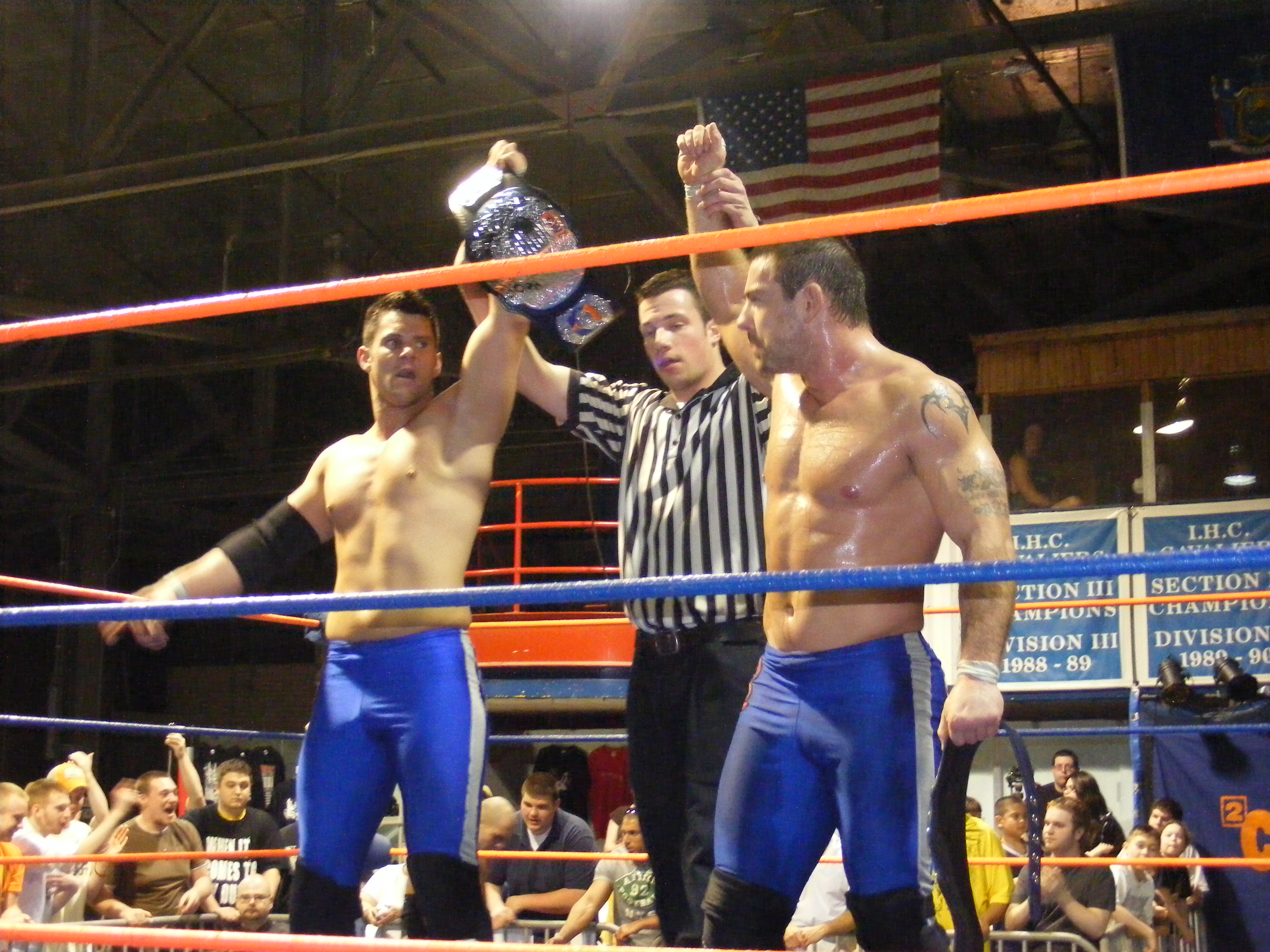
Edwards and Richards as 2CW Tag Team Champions

- Pro Wrestling Illustrated
  - Ranked Richards No. 32 of the top 500 singles wrestlers in the PWI 500 in 2010
  - Ranked Edwards No. 37 of the top 500 singles wrestlers in the PWI 500 in 2010
- Ring of Honor
  - ROH World Championship (2 times) – Edwards (1) and Richards (1)
  - ROH World Tag Team Championship (2 times)
  - ROH World Television Championship (1 time) – Edwards
  - Survival of the Fittest (2010) – Edwards
- Squared Circle Wrestling
  - 2CW Tag Team Championship (1 time)
- The Wrestling Revolver
  - PWR Tag Team Championship (1 time)
- Total Nonstop Action Wrestling
  - TNA World Heavyweight Championship (1 time) – Edwards
  - TNA World Tag Team Championship (5 times)
  - TNA X Division Championship (2 times) – Edwards
- Wrestling Observer Newsletter
  - Tag Team of the Year (2009)
- Wrestling Superstar
  - Wrestling Superstar Tag Team Championship (1 time)
