= Truth Martini =

American professional wrestler and manager

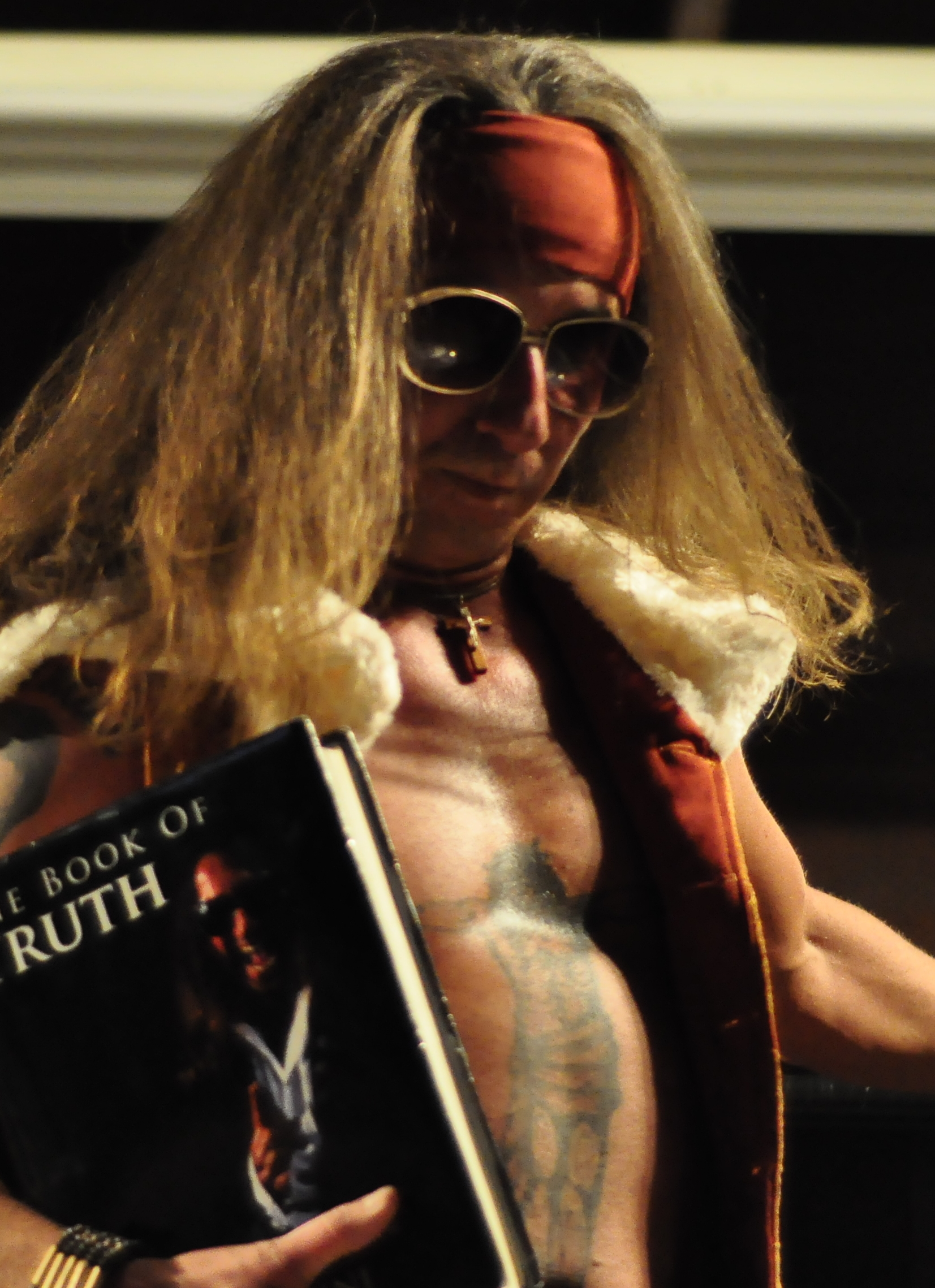
- Martini in 2012

Personal information
- Born: Martin Krcaj; August 8, 1975 (age 51) Hamtramck, Michigan, U.S.

Professional wrestling career
- Ring name: Truth Martini
- Billed height: 5 ft 8 in (1.73 m)
- Billed weight: 200 lb (91 kg)
- Trained by: Al Snow; Crusher Kline
- Debut: 1998
- Retired: September 30, 2018

Martin Krcaj (born May 8, 1975) is an American retired professional wrestler, manager, and trainer better known by the ring name Truth Martini. He is perhaps best known as the manager of The House of Truth stable in Ring of Honor.

== Career ==
=== Early years ===
Martini made his professional wrestling debut for Insane Championship Wrestling in a loss to Andy Muscat. He later joined Juggalo Championship Wrestling and participated in their first show, where Martini was eliminated from a battle royal for the JCW Heavyweight Championship. As a consequence, both Martini and fellow eliminated participant Tarek the Great were forced to dress as Doink the Clown when facing Insane Clown Posse members Shaggy 2 Dope and Violent J for the vacant JCW Tag Team Championships, a match which Martini and Tarek lost.

=== Independent Wrestling Revolution (2002–2007) ===
Truth teamed up with Chris Sabin in their first match for Independent Wrestling Revolution where they were defeated by Frankie The Face & Jaimy Coxxx. On July 24, 2002, Martini and Anthony Rivera, calling themselves The Threat, beat Chris Sabin and Jimmy Jacobs for the IWR Tag Team Championships. They lost the titles a month later to Kamikaze and Tenacious Z, but regained them the next day. After almost a year the pair would lose the championships to Gavin Starr and Jimmy Jacobs. On October 25, 2003, Truth and Rivera defeated the team of Popular Mathematics (Bobby Bambino and Jimmy Shalwin) for the vacant IWR Tag Team Championships. At the beginning of 2004 they lost the titles to The Bump N Uglies (Bubba MacKenzie and Josh Movado), only to regain them in March. They would subsequently lose the championships to The Bump N Uglies in a three way tables match that also included Jaimy Coxxx and Jimmy Shalwin. The Threat then recruited Breyer Wellington and N8 Mattson; however, Truth would leave the stable to focus on a singles career.

On April 16, 2005, Truth defeated Breyer Wellington, Eddie Venom, Gutter, Jaimy Coxxx, and Stevie Lee for IWR King Of The Indies Championship. The title was declared vacant the following July, but Truth regained it in October. Truth held the championship until May 6, 2006, when he lost it to N8 Mattson in an eleven-man gauntlet match. His last match for the company was in October 2007.

=== All American Wrestling (2006–2007) ===
On December 15, 2005, N8 Mattson and Truth Martini defeated Gary Havok and The Golden Ninja in their debut match at All American Wrestling. The two formed a tag team called The Michigan Invasion and had multiple matches for the AAW Tag Team Championships in 2006, but were beaten every time. They participated in AAW Tag Team Championship tournament in June, and reached the semifinals before being knocked out by Dan Lawrence and Ryan Boz. After months of trying, The Michigan Invasion would win the AAW Tag Team Championship in a four corners match which involved Dan Lawrence and Ryan Boz, Jayson Reign and Marco Cordova, and The Phoenix Twins. They would hold the championships until April 2007 where they lost them to Krotch and Zach Gowen.

=== Ring of Honor (2010–2016) ===
A self-professed Life Intervention Expert, Truth Martini and his House of Truth stormed onto the scene of Ring of Honor in 2009. Martini debuted at Violent Tendencies as a heel, managing the team of Josh Raymond and Christian Abel in a loss against Kevin Steen and El Generico. His first singles client, Roderick Strong, had previously struggled with achieving his ultimate goal of winning the ROH World Championship, but finally won the title with Martini's help at 2010's Glory By Honor IX. That same year, Strong was joined in The House of Truth by Michael Elgin, and in April 2012, Martini enlisted the services of Rhino as the hired muscle of the stable; however, in late 2012 both Michael Elgin and Roderick Strong quit The House of Truth.

In 2013 Martini became the manager of Matt Taven.

At Supercard of Honor VIII on April 4, 2014, Truth Martini helped Jay Lethal win the ROH Television Championship and became Lethal's manager. Lethal would retain his championship against numerous acclaimed opponents for over a year before proclaiming himself "THE Ring of Honor Champion" as well as "the only champion that matters in ROH", even above the ROH World Championship held by Jay Briscoe. This resulted in matchmaker Nigel McGuinness booking Lethal and Briscoe in a winner-take-all "Battle of the Belts" at Best in the World 2015 with both championships on the line. With Martini's backing, Lethal defeated Briscoe after two Lethal Injections to retain the Television Championship and win the World Championship.

On January 4, 2016, Martini made his New Japan Pro-Wrestling (NJPW) debut, when he managed Lethal at Wrestle Kingdom 10 in Tokyo Dome. The following month, Martini returned to Japan to take part in the NJPW and ROH co-produced Honor Rising: Japan 2016 event, during which he and Lethal joined the Los Ingobernables de Japón stable.

After months of inactivity after undergoing neck surgery, on September 17, 2016, Dave Meltzer reported via Twitter that Martini had left ROH.

== Championships and accomplishments ==
- All American Wrestling
  - AAW Tag Team Championship (1 time) – with N8 Mattson
- Blue Water Championship Wrestling
  - BWCW Cruiserweight Championship (1 time)
- Border City Wrestling
  - BCW Can-Am Tag Team Championship (1 time) – with N8 Mattson
- Independent Wrestling Revolution
  - IWR King Of The Indies Championship (2 times)
  - IWR Tag Team Champion (4 times) – with Anthony Rivera
- Maximum Pro Wrestling
  - MXPW Cruiserweight Championship (1 time)
- Metro Pro Wrestling
  - MPW Cruiserweight Championship (2 times)
  - MPW Tag Team Championships (1 time) – with Anthony Rivera
- Xtreme Intense Championship Wrestling
  - XICW Intense Championship (2 times)
  - XICW Tag Team Championship (7 times) – with Chris Sabin (1), Nate Mattson (2) and Jaimy Coxxx (4)
  - XICW Tag Team Championship Tournament (2007)
