= Glory By Honor XV =

Professional wrestling event

- Promotion: Ring of Honor
- Date: Night 1: October 14, 2016; Night 2: October 15, 2016
- City: Night 1: Chicago Ridge, Illinois; Night 2: Dearborn, Michigan
- Venue: Night 1: Frontier Fieldhouse; Night 2: Ford Community & Performing Arts Center
- Attendance: Night 1: 700; Night 2: N/A (the combined total attendance for both nights is 1,400)

Pay-per-view chronology
← Previous; All Star Extravaganza VIII	Next → Survival of the Fittest

Glory By Honor chronology
← Previous; XIV	Next → XVI

Glory By Honor XV was a two night, two city professional wrestling event produced by the U.S.-based wrestling promotion Ring of Honor, and the 15th Glory By Honor. The first night of the event took place on October 14, 2016 at the Frontier Fieldhouse in Chicago Ridge, Illinois. The second part of the event took place on October 15, 2016 at Ford Community & Performing Arts Center in Dearborn, Michigan.

== Storylines ==
Glory By Honor XV featured professional wrestling matches involving wrestlers engaged in scripted feuds or storylines that play out on ROH's television program, Ring of Honor Wrestling. Wrestlers portrayed heroes (faces) or villains (heels) as they followed a series of events that built tension and culminated in a wrestling match or series of matches.

== Results ==
=== Night 1 - Chicago Ridge, IL ===
No.	Results	Stipulations	Times
1^{D}	Kelly Klein (with B. J. Whitmer) defeated Thunderkitty	Singles match	7:34
2	Cheeseburger and Will Ferrara defeated The Tempura Boyz (Sho and Yohey)	Tag team match	7:26
3	Donovan Dijak (with Prince Nana) defeated Beer City Bruiser (with Silas Young) and Punishment Martinez (with B. J. Whitmer)	Three-way match	8:44
4	Kamaitachi defeated Ángel de Oro, Nick Jackson (with Matt Jackson) and A. C. H.	Four corner survival match	7:58
5	Jay Briscoe defeated Dalton Castle	Singles match	16:12
6	The Motor City Machine Guns (Alex Shelley and Chris Sabin) and Jay White defeated The Cabinet (Rhett Titus, Kenny King and Caprice Coleman)	Six-man tag team match	14:19
7	Colt Cabana defeated Mark Briscoe	Singles match	11:37
8	Jay Lethal defeated Matt Jackson (with Nick Jackson)	Singles match	5:06
9	The Addiction (Christopher Daniels and Frankie Kazarian) defeated The Young Bucks (Matt Jackson and Nick Jackson) (c) by disqualification	Tag team match for the ROH World Tag Team Championship	13:11
10	reDRagon (Bobby Fish and Kyle O'Reilly) defeated Bullet Club (Adam Cole and Hangman Page)	Tag team match	17:41
(c) / – the champion(s) heading into the match; D / – this was a dark match

=== Night 2 - Dearborn, MI ===
No.	Results	Stipulations
1^{D}	Cheeseburger and Will Ferrara defeated CB Suave and Ken Phoenix	Tag team match
2	Jay White defeated Donovan Dijak (with Prince Nana)	Singles match
3	The All Night Express (Rhett Titus and Kenny King) (with Caprice Coleman) defeated The Tempura Boyz (Sho and Yohey)	Tag team match
4	Kamaitachi defeated Ángel de Oro	Singles match
5	The Motor City Machine Guns (Alex Shelley and Chris Sabin) defeated Silas Young and Beer City Bruiser	Tag team match
6	B. J. Whitmer and Punishment Martinez defeated Blake Acumen and Alex Beardslee	Tag team match
7	Hangman Page defeated A. C. H.	Singles match
8	Jay Lethal defeated Frankie Kazarian (with Christopher Daniels)	Singles match
9	Team ROH Champions (Adam Cole, Bobby Fish, and The Young Bucks (Matt Jackson and Nick Jackson)) and Team ROH All-Stars (The Briscoes (Jay Briscoe and Mark Briscoe), Colt Cabana and Dalton Castle) ended in a no contest	Eight-Man Elimination Tag Team match
10	The Young Bucks (Matt Jackson and Nick Jackson) (c) defeated Colt Cabana and Dalton Castle	Tag team match for the ROH World Tag Team Championship
(c) / – the champion(s) heading into the match; D / – this was a dark match

== See also ==
- 2016 in professional wrestling
