= Glory By Honor XVI =

Professional wrestling event

- Promotion: Ring of Honor
- Date: Night 1: October 12, 2018; Night 2: October 14, 2018 (TV)
- City: Night 1: Baltimore, Maryland; Night 2: Philadelphia, Pennsylvania
- Venue: Night 1: UMBC Event Center; Night 2: 2300 Arena
- Attendance: Night 1: 1,300-1,500; Night 2: 600-800

Pay-per-view chronology
| ← Previous; Death Before Dishonor XVI | Next → Sea of Honor |

Glory By Honor chronology
| ← Previous; XV | Next → XVII |

Glory By Honor XVI was a two night, two city professional wrestling event produced by Ring of Honor (ROH), which took place on October 12, 2018 at UMBC Event Center in Baltimore, Maryland (live event) and on October 14, 2018 at the 2300 Arena in Philadelphia, Pennsylvania (tapings for ROH's flagship program Ring of Honor Wrestling). Night 1 was streamed live on Honor Club.

== Production ==
=== Storylines ===
Other on-screen personnel
| Role | Name |
|---|---|
| Commentators | Colt Cabana |
| Commentators | Ian Riccaboni |
| Commentators | Caprice Coleman |
| Commentators | Madison Rayne |

Glory By Honor XVI featured professional wrestling matches, involving different wrestlers from pre-existing scripted feuds, plots, and storylines that played out on ROH's television programs. Wrestlers portrayed villains or heroes as they followed a series of events that built tension and culminated in a wrestling match or series of matches.

== Results ==
=== Night 1 - Baltimore, MD ===
| No. | Results | Stipulations | Times |
|---|---|---|---|
| 1 | Hangman Page defeated Shane Taylor | Singles match | 9:03 |
| 2 | The Kingdom (T. K. O'Ryan and Vinny Marseglia) defeated Kenny King and Flip Gordon | Tag team match | 5:27 |
| 3 | Jeff Cobb defeated Eli Isom | Singles match | 5:13 |
| 4 | The Briscoes (Jay Briscoe and Mark Briscoe) defeated The Bouncers (Beer City Bruiser and Brian Milonas) | Tag team match | 13:36 |
| 5 | Marty Scurll vs. Shane "Hurricane" Helms ended in a double disqualification | Singles match | 10:32 |
| 6 | Sumie Sakai and Dr. Britt Baker defeated Jenny Rose and Stella Grey | Tag team match | 9:07 |
| 7 | Bully Ray defeated Jonathan Gresham | No disqualification match | 12:19 |
| 8 | Bullet Club (Cody, Matt Jackson and Nick Jackson) (c) defeated SoCal Uncensored (Christopher Daniels, Frankie Kazarian and Scorpio Sky) | Six-man tag team match for the ROH World Six-Man Tag Team Championship | 17:29 |
| 9 | Jay Lethal (c) defeated Silas Young | Singles match for the ROH World Championship | 15:19 |
(c) / – the champion(s) heading into the match

=== Night 2 - Philadelphia, PA (TV Tapings) ===
| No. | Results | Stipulations |
|---|---|---|
| 1 | Sumie Sakai, Madison Rayne and Jenny Rose defeated Kelly Klein, Dr. Britt Baker and Karen Q | Six-woman tag team match |
| 2 | Cody defeated Kenny King by disqualification | Singles match |
| 3 | Jeff Cobb defeated Shane Taylor | Singles match |
| 4 | The Bouncers (Beer City Bruiser and Brian Milonas) defeated Cheeseburger and Eli Isom | Tag team match |
| 5 | Jay Lethal, Jonathan Gresham and Dalton Castle defeated The Kingdom (Matt Taven, T. K. O'Ryan and Vinny Marseglia) | Six-man tag team match |
| 6 | Bully Ray and Silas Young defeated Flip Gordon and The Sandman | Tag team match |
| 7 | Hangman Page defeated Rhett Titus | Singles match |
| 8 | Marty Scurll defeated Shane "Hurricane" Helms | No disqualification match |
| 9 | SoCal Uncensored (Frankie Kazarian and Scorpio Sky) defeated The Briscoes (Jay Briscoe and Mark Briscoe) (c) and The Young Bucks (Matt Jackson and Nick Jackson) | Three-way tag team match for the ROH World Tag Team Championship |
(c) / – the champion(s) heading into the match
