= Glory By Honor X =

2011 Ring of Honor event

Glory by Honor X
- Promotion: Ring of Honor
- Date: November 19, 2011
- City: Chicago Ridge, Illinois
- Venue: Frontier Fieldhouse

Event chronology
| ← Previous; Survival of the Fittest | Next → Southern Defiance |

Glory by Honor chronology
| ← Previous; 2010 | Next → 2012 |

Glory by Honor X was a professional wrestling event promoted by Ring of Honor. It took place on November 19, 2011, at the Frontier Fieldhouse in Chicago Ridge, Illinois.

Was the tenth ROH Glory by Honor event in ROH History.

== Background ==
Other on-screen personnel
| Role | Name |
|---|---|
| Commentators | Dave Prazak |
| Commentators | Kevin Kelly |

=== Storylines ===
Glory by Honor X featured nine different professional wrestling matches, which involved different wrestlers from pre-existing scripted feuds, plots, and storylines that played out on ROH's television programs prior to the show. Wrestlers portrayed villains or heroes as they followed a series of events that built tension and culminated in a wrestling match or series of matches.

The events main event is Davey Richards vs. El Generico for the ROH World Championship.

== Results ==
| No. | Results | Stipulations | Times |
|---|---|---|---|
| 1^{P} | Andy Ridge defeated Matt Sydal | Singles match | 6:20 |
| 2 | Michael Elgin (with Truth Martini) defeated Adam Cole and Grizzly Redwood and Mike Bennett | Four-corner survival match | 9:24 |
| 3 | Jimmy Jacobs (with Steve Corino) vs. Tommaso Ciampa (with Mia Yim, Mr. Ernesto Osiris, Prince Nana & RD Evans) ended in a no contest | Singles match | 6:39 |
| 4 | Tommaso Ciampa defeated Harlem Bravado (with Lancelot Bravado) | Singles match | 0:19 |
| 5 | Eddie Edwards defeated Kyle O'Reilly | Singles match | 15:21 |
| 6 | The Briscoes (Jay Briscoe & Mark Briscoe) defeated The Young Bucks (Matt Jackson & Nick Jackson) | Tag team match | 12:17 |
| 7 | Jay Lethal (c) defeated Roderick Strong | Singles match ROH World Television Championship Proving Ground Match | 17:06 |
| 8 | Wrestling's Greatest Tag Team (Charlie Haas & Shelton Benjamin) (c) defeated The All-Night Express (Kenny King & Rhett Titus) | Tag team match for the ROH World Tag Team Championships | 22:03 |
| 9 | Davey Richards (c) defeated El Generico | Singles match for the ROH World Championship | 30:01 |
(c) / – the champion(s) heading into the match; P / – the match was broadcast on the pre-show

== See also ==
- ROH Glory by Honor
- List of Ring of Honor pay-per-view events
- List of Ring of Honor special events
- 2011 in professional wrestling
- Supercard of Honor X
