= Glory By Honor XII =

2013 Ring of Honor event

Glory by Honor XII
- Promotion: Ring of Honor
- Date: October 26, 2013
- City: Chicago Ridge, Illinois
- Venue: Frontier Fieldhouse
- Attendance: 2,100

Event chronology
← Previous; Death Before Dishonor XI	Next → Final Battle 2013

Glory by Honor chronology
← Previous; XI	Next → XIII

Glory by Honor XII was the 12th Glory By Honor professional wrestling event produced by Ring of Honor (ROH). It took place on October 26, 2013, at the Frontier Fieldhouse in Chicago Ridge, Illinois. It was not aired live but it was taped for three episodes of Ring of Honor Wrestling.

== Production ==
Other on-screen personnel
Role	Name
Commentators	Nigel McGuinness
Commentators	Kevin Kelly
Commentators	Steve Corino
Commentators	Veda Scott

=== Background ===
Glory by Honor XII featured seven professional wrestling matches, which involved different wrestlers from pre-existing scripted feuds, plots, and storylines that played out on ROH's television programs. Wrestlers portrayed villains or heroes as they followed a series of events that built tension and culminated in a wrestling match or series of matches.

The main event was titled a Champions vs. All Stars match, where by if any of the All Star team members pinned Adam Cole they will receive a future ROH World Championship title shot. Subsequently, Michael Elgin pinned Cole to win the match for his team.

== Results ==
No.	Results	Stipulations	Times
1^{D}	The Romantic Touch defeated Will Ferrara	Singles match	—
2^{D}	MsChif defeated Kasey Ray	Women of Honor Singles match	—
3	Silas Young defeated Mark Briscoe	Singles match	08:59
4	Jimmy Jacobs defeated Adam Page	Singles match	11:51
5	Michael Bennett (with Maria Kanellis) defeated Kevin Steen	Singles match	12:07
6	Tommaso Ciampa defeated Jessy Sorensen	Singles match	08:59
7	Outlaw Inc. (Eddie Kingston and Homicide) defeated Adrenaline Rush (A. C. H. and TaDarius Thomas)	Tag Team match	08:13
8	Paul London defeated Roderick Strong	Singles match	15:21
9	Michael Elgin, Jay Lethal, Caprice Coleman and Cedric Alexander defeated Adam Cole, Bobby Fish, Kyle O'Reilly and Matt Taven (with Truth Martini)	Eight-Man Elimination Tag Team match	73:00
D / – this was a dark match
