= Glory By Honor XIII =

Professional wrestling event

Glory by Honor XIII
- Promotion: Ring of Honor
- Date: November 15, 2014
- City: San Antonio, Texas
- Venue: San Antonio Shrine Auditorim
- Attendance: 800

Event chronology
← Previous; Survival of The Fittest: Night 1	Next → Final Battle 2014

Glory By Honor chronology
← Previous; XII	Next → XIV

Glory By Honor XIII was the 13th Glory By Honor professional wrestling event produced by Ring of Honor (ROH). It took place on November 15, 2014 at the San Antonio Shrine Auditorium in San Antonio, Texas.

== Background ==
=== Storylines ===
Glory by Honor XIII featured seven professional wrestling matches, which involved different wrestlers from pre-existing scripted feuds, plots, and storylines that played out on ROH's television programs. Wrestlers portrayed villains or heroes as they followed a series of events that built tension and culminated in a wrestling match or series of matches.

== Results ==
No.	Results	Stipulations	Times
1^{P}	J. Diesel defeated Shane Taylor	Singles match	—
2	Tommaso Ciampa defeated Romantic Touch	Singles match	8:12
3	Hanson defeated Mark Briscoe, B. J. Whitmer and Moose	Four corner survival match	13:55
4	Frankie Kazarian defeated Roderick Strong	Singles match	15:02
5	reDRagon (Bobby Fish and Kyle O'Reilly) (c) defeated The Kingdom (Matt Taven and Michael Bennett) (with Maria Kanellis)	Tag team match for the ROH World Tag Team Championship	17:36
6	Will Ferrara defeated Adam Page (with Roderick Strong and B. J. Whitmer)	Singles match	7:38
7	Jay Lethal (c) (with Truth Martini) defeated R.D. Evans (with Moose, Veda Scott and Ramon)	Singles match for the ROH World Television Championship	20:30
8	Adam Cole defeated Christopher Daniels	Singles match	25:08
9	Jay Briscoe (c) defeated A. C. H.	Singles match for the ROH World Championship	19:33
(c) / – the champion(s) heading into the match; P / – the match was broadcast on the pre-show
