= Glory By Honor XIV =

Professional wrestling event

- Promotion: Ring of Honor
- Date: Night 1: October 23, 2015; Night 2: October 24, 2015
- City: Night 1: Kalamazoo, Michigan; Night 2: Dayton, Ohio
- Venue: Night 1: Wings Event Center; Night 2: Montgomery County Fairgrounds Coliseum
- Attendance: Night 1: 600; Night 2: 900

Pay-per-view chronology
← Previous; All Star Extravaganza VII	Next → Survival of the Fittest

Glory By Honor chronology
← Previous; XIII	Next → XV

Glory By Honor XIV (also known as Glory By Honor XIV Champions Vs. All Stars) was a two night, two city professional wrestling event produced by the U.S.-based wrestling promotion Ring of Honor, and the 14th Glory By Honor. The first night of the event took place on October 23, 2015 as a television taping for ROH's weekly television program at the Wings Event Center in Kalamazoo, Michigan. The second part of the event took place on October 24, 2015, at Montgomery County Fairgrounds Coliseum in Dayton, Ohio.

== Production ==
=== Storylines ===
Other on-screen personnel
Role	Name
Commentators	Ian Riccaboni
Commentators	Veda Scott
Commentators	BJ Whitmer
Commentators	Kevin Kelly
Commentators	Prince Nana
Commentators	AJ Styles

Glory By Honor XIV featured professional wrestling matches involving wrestlers engaged in scripted feuds or storylines that play out on ROH's television program, Ring of Honor Wrestling. Wrestlers portrayed heroes (faces) or villains (heels) as they followed a series of events that built tension and culminated in a wrestling match or series of matches.

At Best in the World on June 19, 2015, Jay Lethal defeated Jay Briscoe to win the ROH World Championship and retain the ROH World Television Championship, and on September 18 at All Star Extravaganza VII The Kingdom defeated The Addiction to win the ROH World Tag Team Championship. On September 29, 2015, ROH announced that Glory By Honor XIV would feature a Champions vs. All Stars theme.

On September 18 at All Star Extravaganza VII The All Night Express returned to defeat The Briscoes in an Open Challenge Tag Match. On October 6, ROH announced that Kenny King and Rhett Titus would go head to head with Jay Briscoe and Mark Briscoe in an All Star Extravaganza VII rematch at Glory By Honor XIV.

On September 18 at All Star Extravaganza VII, The Kingdom (Michael Bennett and Matt Taven) defeated The Young Bucks and former ROH World Tag Team Champions The Addiction in a 3-way tag team match after a masked KRD member attacked Christopher Daniels. On October 7, ROH announced that The Addiction would cash in their rematch clause to face The Kingdom at Glory By Honor XIV.

== Results ==
=== Night 1 - Kalamazoo, MI ===
No.	Results	Stipulations	Times
1	A. C. H. defeated Cedric Alexander (with Veda Scott)	Singles match	12:43
2	Caprice Coleman defeated Will Ferrara	Singles match	6:01
3	The Briscoes (Jay Briscoe and Mark Briscoe) defeated The All Night Express (Rhett Titus and Kenny King)	Tag team match	11:46
4	War Machine (Hanson and Raymond Rowe) defeated Silas Young and Beer City Bruiser	Tag team match	7:32
5	Michael Elgin defeated KLD	Singles match	0:09
6	The Kingdom (Matt Taven and Michael Bennett) (c) (with Maria Kanellis) defeated The Addiction (Christopher Daniels and Frankie Kazarian) (with Chris Sabin)	Tag team match for the ROH World Tag Team Championship	11:20
7	Leah Von Dutch defeated Crazy Mary Dobson	Singles match	4:26
8	Moose (with Stokley Hathaway) defeated Dominic Carter	Singles match	0:07
9	Michael Elgin and Moose (with Stokley Hathaway) defeated The House of Truth (Donovan Dijak and Joey Daddiego) (with Truth Martini)	Tag team match	8:58
10	Roderick Strong defeated Jay Lethal (c)	Singles match for the ROH World Television Championship	16:48
11	Will Ferrara defeated Adam Page by disqualification	Singles match	4:08
12	Cheeseburger defeated Tim Hughes (with Bob Evans)	Singles match	—
13	Adam Cole vs. Dalton Castle ended in a no contest	Singles match	1:45
14	The Kingdom (Adam Cole, Matt Taven and Michael Bennett) (with Maria Kanellis) defeated Dalton Castle and War Machine (Hanson and Raymond Rowe)	Six-man tag team match	11:13
(c) / – the champion(s) heading into the match

=== Night 2 - Dayton, OH ===
No.	Results	Stipulations	Times
1^{D}	Kongo defeated Ken Phoenix	Singles match	—
2	Kelly Klein (with B. J. Whitmer) defeated Ray Lynn	Women of Honor Singles match	1:11
3	Adam Cole defeated Will Ferrara	Singles match	9:13
4	The All Night Express (Rhett Titus and Kenny King) defeated Silas Young and Beer City Bruiser	Tag team Match	11:20
5	Caprice Coleman defeated Samson Walker	Singles match	8:13
6	Michael Elgin defeated Donovan Dijak (with Truth Martini and Taeler Hendrix)	Singles match	18:57
7	Joey Daddiego (with Truth Martini and Taeler Hendrix) defeated Shaheem Ali	Singles match	6:52
8	Cliff Compton defeated Adam Page (with B. J. Whitmer and Colby Corino), Cedric Alexander (with Veda Scott) and Bob Evans (with Tim Hughes)	Four corner survival match	7:57
9	The Briscoes (Jay Briscoe and Mark Briscoe) defeated War Machine (Hanson and Raymond Rowe)	Tag team Match	20:48
10	ROH Champions (Jay Lethal (World), Roderick Strong (World TV) and The Kingdom (Matt Taven and Michael Bennett)) (with Truth Martini and Maria Kanellis) (World Tag Team) defeated ROH All-Stars (Moose, The Addiction (Christopher Daniels and Frankie Kazarian) and Dalton Castle) (with Stokley Hathaway and Chris Sabin)	Eight-Man Elimination Tag Team match	33:30
D / – this was a dark match
