= Glory By Honor =

ROH Glory By Honor
- Promotions: Ring of Honor
- First event: Glory By Honor

Glory By Honor is a professional wrestling pay-per-view (PPV) event promoted by Ring of Honor (ROH). There have been 11 events in the Glory by Honor chronology, some of which occurred over two nights.

Since its inception in 2002, all events have been held in an indoor arena, except for Glory By Honor V, Night 1, which was held under a tent outside the original venue. The show itself was threatened due to a problem with permits. Each event featured wrestlers from ROH competing in various professional wrestling match types. Since the inaugural event, six championship matches have taken place in the main event.

== Background ==
Glory By Honor features professional wrestling matches that involved different wrestlers from existing, scripted feuds and storylines with wrestlers portrayed as villains or heroes, or more ambiguous characters in scripted contests that build tension and culminate in a wrestling match on the pay per view.

In 2010, Ring of Honor's official website announced that ROH would have their next online pay per view event in New York, being the first time the Glory By Honor lineage would be featured in such a capacity. This is the fourth pay per view ROH had featured online.

== Dates and venues ==
Event	Date	Venue	City	Main event
Glory By Honor	October 5, 2002	Murphy Recreational Center	Philadelphia, Pennsylvania	Christopher Daniels vs. Doug Williams
Glory By Honor II	September 20, 2003	Murphy Recreation Center	Philadelphia, Pennsylvania	Samoa Joe (c) vs. Christopher Daniels for the ROH World Championship
Glory By Honor 3	September 11, 2004	The Rex Plex	Elizabeth, New Jersey	The Rottweilers (Ricky Reyes and Rocky Romero) (c) vs. Dan Maff and B. J. Whitmer vs. The Carnage Crew (H. C. Loc and Tony DeVito) vs. Generation Next (Roderick Strong and Jack Evans) in an Ultimate Endurance match for the ROH Tag Team Championship
Glory By Honor IV	September 17, 2005	Sports & Entertainment Center	Lake Grove, New York	AJ Styles vs. Jimmy Rave in a Finishers match
Glory By Honor V : Night 1	September 15, 2006	Sports World	East Windsor, Connecticut	The Briscoe Brothers (Jay Briscoe and Mark Briscoe) vs. KENTA and Naomichi Marufuji
Glory By Honor V : Night 2	September 16, 2006	Manhattan Center	New York City, New York	Bryan Danielson (c) vs. KENTA for the ROH World Championship
Glory By Honor VI : Night One	November 2, 2007	Pennsylvania National Guard Armory	Philadelphia, Pennsylvania	Mitsuharu Misawa and KENTA vs. Takeshi Morishima and Naomichi Marufuji
Glory By Honor VI : Night Two	November 3, 2007	Manhattan Center	New York City, New York	The Briscoe Brothers (Jay Briscoe and Mark Briscoe) vs. The Age of the Fall (Jimmy Jacobs and Necro Butcher) in a Street Fight
Glory By Honor VII	September 20, 2008	The Arena	Philadelphia, Pennsylvania	Austin Aries and The Briscoe Brothers (Jay Briscoe and Mark Briscoe) vs. The Age of the Fall (Jimmy Jacobs, Tyler Black and Delirious) vs. Necro Butcher in a Steel Cage Warfare match
Glory by Honor VIII: The Final Countdown	September 26, 2009	Manhattan Center	New York City, New York	Bryan Danielson vs. Nigel McGuinness
Glory By Honor IX	September 11, 2010	Manhattan Center	New York City, New York	Roderick Strong vs. Tyler Black (c) for the ROH World Championship
Glory By Honor X	November 19, 2011	Frontier Fieldhouse	Chicago Ridge, Illinois	Davey Richards (c) vs. El Generico for the ROH World Championship
Glory By Honor XI: The Unbreakable Hope	October 13, 2012	International Centre	Mississauga, Ontario, Canada	Kevin Steen (c) vs. Michael Elgin for the ROH World Championship
Glory By Honor XII	October 26, 2013	Frontier Fieldhouse	Chicago Ridge, Illinois	ROH Champions (Adam Cole, Bobby Fish, Kyle O'Reilly and Matt Taven) vs. ROH All-Stars (Caprice Coleman, Cedric Alexander, Jay Lethal and Michael Elgin)
Glory By Honor XIII	November 15, 2014	San Antonio Shrine Auditorium	San Antonio, Texas	Jay Briscoe (c) vs. A. C. H. for the ROH World Championship
Glory By Honor XIV	October 24, 2015	Montgomery County Fairgrounds Coliseum	Dayton, Ohio	ROH Champions (Jay Lethal, Roderick Strong and The Kingdom - Matt Taven and Michael Bennett) (with Truth Martini and Maria Kanellis) vs. ROH All-Stars (Moose, The Addiction (Christopher Daniels and Frankie Kazarian) and Dalton Castle) (with Stokley Hathaway and Chris Sabin)
Glory By Honor XV Night 1	October 14, 2016	Frontier Fieldhouse	Chicago Ridge, Illinois	reDRagon (Bobby Fish and Kyle O'Reilly) vs. Bullet Club (Adam Cole and Hangman Page)
Glory By Honor XV Night 2	October 15, 2016	Ford Community & Performing Arts Center	Dearborn, Michigan	The Young Bucks (Matt Jackson and Nick Jackson) (c) vs. Colt Cabana and Dalton Castle for the ROH World Tag Team Championship
Glory By Honor XVI: Baltimore	October 12, 2018	UMBC Event Center	Baltimore, Maryland	Jay Lethal (c) vs. Silas Young for the ROH World Championship
Glory By Honor XVI: Philadelphia (TV Taping)	October 14, 2018	2300 Arena	Philadelphia, Pennsylvania	The Briscoes (Jay Briscoe and Mark Briscoe) (c) vs. SoCal Uncensored (Frankie Kazarian and Scorpio Sky) vs. The Young Bucks (Matt Jackson and Nick Jackson) for the ROH World Tag Team Championship
Glory By Honor XVII	October 12, 2019	UNO Lakefront Arena	New Orleans, Louisiana	Marty Scurll vs. PCO
Glory By Honor XVIII Night 1	August 20, 2021	2300 Arena	Philadelphia, Pennsylvania	Bandido (c) vs. Flip Gordon for the ROH World Championship
Glory By Honor XVIII Night 2	August 21, 2021	2300 Arena	Philadelphia, Pennsylvania	Matt Taven vs. Vincent in a steel cage match for Taven's ROH World Championship opportunity
(c) – refers to the champion(s) heading into the match

== See also ==
- ROH's annual events
