= Glory By Honor IX =

American wrestling event

- Promotional poster for the event, showing Tyler Black with the ROH World Championship
- Promotion: Ring of Honor
- Date: September 11, 2010
- City: New York, New York
- Venue: Manhattan Center
- Attendance: 1,300

Pay-per-view chronology
← Previous; Death Before Dishonor VIII	Next → Final Battle

Glory By Honor chronology
← Previous; VIII	Next → X

Glory By Honor IX was a professional wrestling pay-per-view (PPV) event produced by Ring of Honor (ROH), which was only available online. It took place on September 11, 2010, at the Manhattan Center in New York City. This was the ninth event entitled Glory By Honor produced by ROH, but was the first broadcast live online, would be the final ROH appearance of Tyler Black.

== Production ==
=== Background ===
Other on-screen personnel
Commentators	Joe Dombrowski
Commentators	Kevin Kelly

In July 2010, ROH announced that Glory By Honor IX would be taking place in the Grand Ballroom at the Manhattan Center in New York City on September 11, 2010, and would be live on internet pay-per-view through GoFightLive.

ROH announced that, prior to the show, there would be a special autograph signing with Terry Funk, an american professional wrestler.

=== Storylines ===
Glory By Honor IX featured professional wrestling matches that involved different wrestlers from existing, scripted feuds and storylines. Wrestlers were portrayed as villains or heroes, or more ambiguous characters in scripted contests that built tension and culminated in a wrestling match on the pay-per-view.

== Results ==
No.	Results	Stipulations	Times
1	Kenny King defeated Jay Briscoe	Singles match	07:39
2	Mark Briscoe defeated Rhett Titus	Singles match	—
3	The Embassy (Erick Stevens and Necro Butcher) (with Prince Nana) defeated Grizzly Redwood and Ballz Mahoney	Tag team match	07:44
4	Colt Cabana and El Generico defeated Kevin Steen and Steve Corino	Double Chain match	19:43
5	Eddie Edwards (c) defeated Shawn Daivari (with Prince Nana)	Singles match for the ROH World Television Championship	07:43
6	Christopher Daniels defeated Austin Aries	Singles match	13:07
7	The Kings of Wrestling (Claudio Castagnoli and Chris Hero) defeated Wrestling's Greatest Tag Team (Charlie Haas and Shelton Benjamin)	Tag team match	20:43
8	Roderick Strong (with Truth Martini) defeated Tyler Black (c)	No Disqualification match for the ROH World Championship	15:00
(c) / – the champion(s) heading into the match

== See also ==
- 2010 in professional wrestling
- List of Ring of Honor pay-per-view events
