= Glory By Honor IV =

2005 Ring of Honor event

Glory by Honor IV
- Promotion: Ring of Honor
- Date: September 17, 2005
- City: Long Island, New York
- Venue: Sports and Entertainment Center
- Attendance: 600

Pay-per-view chronology
| ← Previous; Night of Grudges II | Next → Survival of the Fittest |

Glory by Honor chronology
| ← Previous; 2004 | Next → 2006 |

Glory by Honor IV was the fourth Glory by Honor and major professional wrestling event produced by Ring of Honor (ROH). It took place on September 17, 2005 from the Sports and Entertainment Center in Long Island, New York.

This was the fourth annual event in the Glory by Honor chronology, with the first taking place in 2002.

== Production ==
Other on-screen personnel
| Role | Name |
|---|---|
| Commentators | Dave Prazak |
| Commentators | Jimmy Bower |
| Commentators | Lenny Leonard |

=== Storylines ===
Glory by Honor IV featured eleven different professional wrestling matches that involved different wrestlers from pre-existing scripted feuds and storylines. Wrestlers were portrayed as either villains or heroes in the scripted events that built tension and culminated in a wrestling match involving.

The shows main event featured AJ Styles (with Mick Foley) vs. Jimmy Rave (with Prince Nana) in a Finisher's match.

=== Background ===
It is also the fourth Glory by Honor event in Ring of Honor history.

== Results ==
| No. | Results | Stipulations | Times |
|---|---|---|---|
| 1^{D} | Antonio Blanca & Smash Bradley defeated Bobby Dempsey & Derek Dempsey | Tag team match | — |
| 2^{D} | Shane Hagadorn defeated Pelle Primeau | Singles match | — |
| 3 | Low Ki (with Julius Smokes) defeated Jay Lethal | Fight Without Honor match | 16:22 |
| 4 | Austin Aries defeated Azrieal | Singles match | 11:16 |
| 5 | Nigel McGuinness (c) defeated Roderick Strong | Singles match for the ROH Pure Championship | 12:13 |
| 6 | Colt Cabana defeated Homicide (with Julius Smokes) by DQ | Singles match | 14:29 |
| 7 | Jay Lethal (with Samoa Joe) defeated Low Ki (with Julius Smokes) | Singles match | 9:19 |
| 8 | Davey Andrews defeated Eric Matlock | Singles match | 2:28 |
| 9 | Samoa Joe defeated Adam Pearce and BJ Whitmer and Ricky Reyes | Four Corner Survival match | 18:38 |
| 10 | Bryan Danielson defeated James Gibson (c) | Singles match for the ROH World Championship | 32:23 |
| 11 | AJ Styles (with Mick Foley) defeated Jimmy Rave (with Prince Nana) | Finisher's match | 18:42 |
(c) / – the champion(s) heading into the match; D / – this was a dark match

== See also ==
- List of Ring of Honor special events
- List of Ring of Honor pay-per-view events
