= Glory by Honor =

2002 Ring of Honor event

- Promotion: Ring of Honor (ROH)
- Date: October 5, 2002
- City: Philadelphia, Pennsylvania
- Venue: Murphy Recreation Center

Pay-per-view chronology
← Previous; Unscripted	Next → All Star Extravaganza

Glory by Honor chronology
← Previous; First	Next → 2003

Glory by Honor was the first Glory by Honor and major professional wrestling event produced by Ring of Honor (ROH). It took place on October 5, 2002 from the Murphy Recreation Center in Philadelphia, Pennsylvania.

This was the first Glory by Honor event in the Glory by Honor chronology, taking place in 2002.

== Production ==
=== Storylines ===
Other on-screen personnel
Role	Name
Commentators	Chris Lovey
Commentators	Jeff Gorman

Glory by Honor featured fourteen different professional wrestling matches that involved different wrestlers from pre-existing scripted feuds and storylines. Wrestlers were portrayed as either villains or heroes in the scripted events that built tension and culminated in a wrestling match involving.

The shows main event featured Doug Williams vs. Christopher Daniels with Simply Luscious.

=== Background ===
It is also the first ever Glory by Honor event in Ring of Honor history.

== Results ==
No.	Results	Stipulations	Times
1	Homicide (Note: During the match Homicide had no tag team partner, but had to compete solo.) defeated Divine Storm (Chris Divine & Quiet Storm) (with Trinity) and Special K (Dixie & Izzy) (with Elax) and The SAT (Joel Maximo & Jose Maximo)	Four-Way Tag team match	13:52
2	The Backseat Boyz (Johnny Kashmere & Trent Acid) defeated Homicide & Steve Corino	Tag team match	6:45
3	The Christopher Street Connection (Allison Danger, Buff-E & Mace) (with Japanese Pool Boy) defeated Alexis Laree, Christian York & Joey Matthews	Six Person Mixed Tag Team match	4:45
4	Tony Mamaluke defeated James Maritato	Singles match Winner Earns Rights Of FBI Gimmick	8:30
5	The Amazing Red defeated Ikuto Hidaka	Singles match	13:40
6	Fast Eddie (c) defeated Don Juan	Singles match for the ETW Television Championship	3:25
7	Steve Corino (with Bio-Hazard & Michael Shane) defeated Rudy Boy Gonzales	Singles match	8:00
8	Low Ki defeated Samoa Joe	Singles match	16:25
9	Prince Nana defeated Elax	Fight Without Honor Singles match	0:55
10^{D}	The Insane Clown Posse (Shaggy 2 Dope & Violent J) defeated The Outcast Killaz (Diablo Santiago & Oman Tortuga)	Singles match	0:43
11	Jay Briscoe defeated Xavier (with Simply Luscious)	Singles match	13:35
12	The Carnage Crew (DeVito & Loc) defeated Da Hit Squad (Mafia & Monsta Mack)	Philadelphia Street Fight	6:50
13	Michael Shane (with Bio-Hazard) defeated Paul London and Spanky	Triple threat Elimination match	19:45
14	Christopher Daniels (with Simply Luscious) defeated Doug Williams	Singles match	12:25
(c) / – the champion(s) heading into the match; D / – this was a dark match

== See also ==
- List of Ring of Honor special events
- List of Ring of Honor pay-per-view events
