= Beer City Bruiser =

American professional wrestler

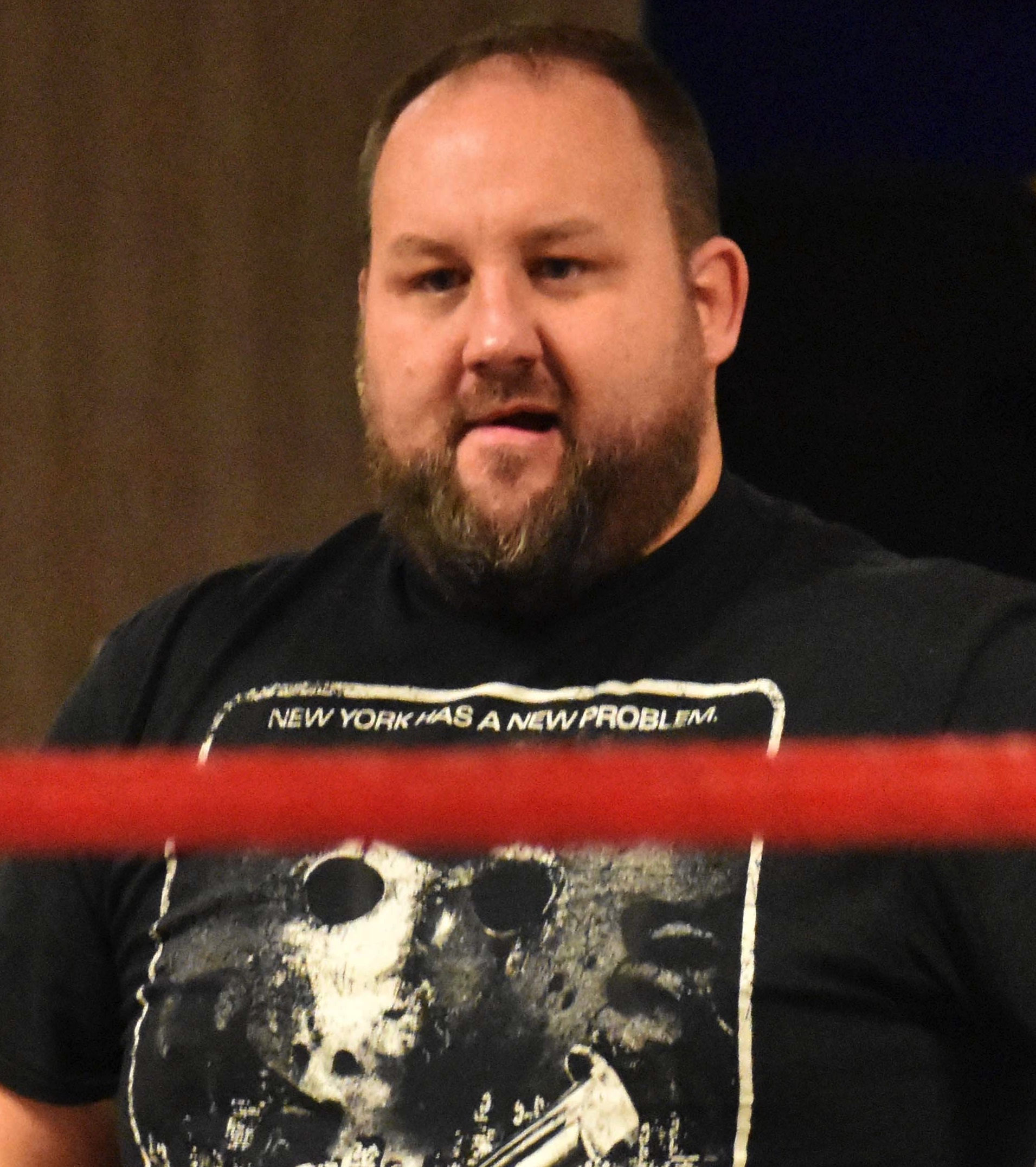
- Beer City Bruiser in April 2019.

Personal information
- Born: Matthew Dearth; July 21, 1978 (age 48) Milwaukee, Wisconsin, United States

Professional wrestling career
- Ring name: Beer City Bruiser
- Billed height: 6 ft 2 in (188 cm)
- Billed weight: 323 lb (147 kg)
- Billed from: Milwaukee, Wisconsin, United States
- Trained by: Trevor Adonis; Harley Race
- Debut: May 2000

Matthew Dearth (born July 21, 1978) is an American professional wrestler. He is best known for his time with Ring of Honor, where he performed under the ring name Beer City Bruiser.

== Professional wrestling career ==
=== Independent circuit (2000–present) ===
On the November 1, 2004 episode of Monday Night Raw, Winchester was planted in the audience to be called into the ring by debuting Simon Dean. Winchester would go on to shove Dean before being suplexed to the ground and placed into a chicken wing hold.

=== Ring of Honor (2015–2021) ===
After a non-televised match in 2013, Winchester debuted in Ring of Honor on January 3, 2015, participating in the 2015 Top Prospect Tournament. He defeated Mikey Webb before being eliminated in the semi-finals by Will Ferrara.

Soon thereafter, Winchester formed his now long-standing tag team with Silas Young. Bruiser lost to Dalton Castle on September 12 and a week later, he and Silas Young defeated The Boys, the former 'servants' of Dalton Castle.

Bruiser made his pay-per-view debut at Glory By Honor XIV on October 24, teaming with Young in a losing effort to The All-Night Express (Kenny King and Rhett Titus). At supercard of Honor X April 2, 2016, Bruiser and Young wrestled for the ROH World Tag Team Championship against War Machine (Hanson and Rowe).

At ROH/NJPW War of the Worlds 2016 on May 9, BCB and Young lost to A. C. H. and Matt Sydal. On June 12, they won the 2016 Tag Wars tournament, defeating the All-Night Express and the Briscoe Brothers, becoming number one contenders to the ROH Tag Team titles. On June 25, they lost to defending champions The Addiction (Christopher Daniels and Frankie Kazarian).

In September 2016 BCB was injured, forcing the cancellation of his ROH and independent commitments. He made his return at Glory By Honor XV, losing in a three-way match against Punishment Martinez and winner Donovan Dijak. BCB and Silas Young teamed again the following night against The Motor City Machine Guns.

On March 4, 2017 at Manhattan Mayhem VI, Bruiser participated in an ROH World title number one contendership 20-man battle royal. On April 1 at Supercard of Honor XI, he and Silas Young defeated The Kingdom (Matt Taven and Vinny Marseglia.

On May 10 – the second day of ROH/NJPW War of the Worlds 2017 – Bruiser competed in a seven-man TV title number one contendership match, which was won by Cheeseburger. On July 29, Bruiser lost against Jay Lethal in a no disqualification match. In 2018 Beer City Bruiser and Brian Milonas formed the tag team called The Bouncers after a falling out with Silas Young. On ROH television, Silas Young defeated Beer City Bruiser in a no disqualification match to end their feud.

== Championships and accomplishments ==
- Allied Independent Wrestling Federations
  - AIWF World Heavyweight Championship (1 time)
- POWW Entertainment
  - POWW Tag Team Championship (1 time) – with Nick Colucci
- Brew City Wrestling
  - BCW Heavyweight Championship (4 times)
  - BCW Legacy Championship (1 time)
  - BCW Tag Team Championship (4 times) – with Brandon Tatum (1) and Nick Colucci (3)
- ComPro
  - ComPro X Division Championship (1 time)
- Insane Championship Wrestling (USA)
  - ICW Heavyweight Championship (1 time)
  - ICW West Central Championship (1 time)
  - ICW Tag Team Championship (4 times) – with Brandon Blaze
- National Wrestling Alliance
  - NWA Heartland States Heavyweight Championship (2 times)
- Pro Wrestling Illustrated
  - Ranked No. 318 of the top 500 wrestlers in the PWI 500 in 2017
- Ring of Honor
  - Tag Wars (2016) – with Silas Young
- UPW Pro Wrestling
  - UPW International Championship (1 time)
- America's Most Liked Wrestling
  - AML Prestige Championship (1 time)
- Wisconsin Pro Wrestling/All-Star Championship Wrestling
  - ACW Heavyweight Championship (1 time)
  - NWA Wisconsin Heavyweight Championship (1 time)
  - NWA Unleashed Heavyweight Championship (1 time)
  - ACW Tag Team Championship (1 time) – with Nick Colucci
  - WPW Tag Team Championship (1 time) – with Nick Colucci
  - NWA Wisconsin Tag Team Championship (3 times) – with Jose Guerrero (1), Nick Colucci (2)
- World League Wrestling
  - WLW Tag Team Championship (2 times) – with Brandon Tatum (1) and Brian Breaker (1)
