= Glory By Honor VIII: The Final Countdown =

- Promotion: Ring of Honor
- Date: September 26, 2009
- City: New York, New York
- Venue: Manhattan Center
- Attendance: 1, 400

Pay-per-view chronology
← Previous; The Final Countdown Tour (Boston)	Next → Clash of the Contenders

Glory By Honor chronology
← Previous; VII	Next → IX

Glory by Honor VIII: The Final Countdown was the 8th Glory By Honor professional wrestling event promoted by Ring of Honor. It took place on September 26, 2009, at the Manhattan Center in New York, New York. The show was headlined by Bryan Danielson vs. Nigel McGuinness, who were both making their last appearances for ROH before leaving for World Wrestling Entertainment. Danielson would go on to find success in the WWE, however McGuinness' contract had fallen through and he signed with Total Nonstop Action Wrestling. Danielson, who was the first to announce he was signing with WWE, was originally scheduled to face Austin Aries for the ROH World Championship, but the match was later changed when McGuinness also announced he was signing.

== Background ==
=== Storylines ===
Glory by Honor VIII featured nine different professional wrestling matches, which involved different wrestlers from pre-existing scripted feuds, plots, and storylines that played out on ROH's television programs prior to the show. Wrestlers portrayed villains or heroes as they followed a series of events that built tension and culminated in a wrestling match or series of matches.

The second main event of the show featured Kevin Steen and El Generico ending their feud with the ROH World Tag Team Champions The American Wolves (Davey Richards & Eddie Edwards) in Ladder War II. There was uncertainty as to whether or not the match would even take place, as Edwards broke his elbow the night before in an "Anything Goes" match against Steen. Despite the injury, Edwards decided to compete in the match.

== Results ==
No.	Results	Stipulations	Times
1	Colt Cabana defeated Rhett Titus	Singles match	6:24
2	The Dark City Fight Club (Jon Davis and Kory Chavis) defeated Up In Smoke (Cheech and Cloudy)	Tag team match	9:43
3	Claudio Castagnoli defeated Kenny Omega	Singles match	9:36
4	Roderick Strong defeated Delirious and Grizzly Redwood and Sonjay Dutt	Four Corner Survival match	11:53
5	The American Wolves (Davey Richards and Eddie Edwards) (c) defeated El Generico and Kevin Steen	Ladder War II for the ROH World Tag Team Championship	25:05
6	Chris Hero defeated Eddie Kingston	Singles match	16:09
7	Austin Aries (c) defeated Petey Williams by count-out	Singles match for the ROH World Championship	19:52
8	The Young Bucks (Matt Jackson and Nick Jackson) defeated The Briscoe Brothers (Jay Briscoe and Mark Briscoe)	Tag team match	17:04
9	Bryan Danielson defeated Nigel McGuinness	Singles match	28:25
(c) / – the champion(s) heading into the match
