= Glory By Honor V =

2006 Ring of Honor event

Glory by Honor V
- Promotion: Ring of Honor
- Date: Night One: September 15, 2006; Night Two: September 16, 2006
- City: Night One: East Windsor, Connecticut; Night Two: New York City, New York
- Venue: Night One: Sports World; Night Two: Manhattan Center
- Attendance: Night One: 500; Night Two: 1,200

Pay-per-view chronology
← Previous; Unified	Next → Survival of the Fittest

Glory by Honor chronology
← Previous; 2005	Next → 2007

Glory by Honor V was the fifth Glory by Honor and major professional wrestling event produced by Ring of Honor (ROH). It took place on September 15 and September 16 of 2006 from the Sports World in East Windsor, Connecticut and from the Manhattan Center in New York City, New York.

This was the fifth annual event in the Glory by Honor chronology, with the first taking place in 2002.

== Production ==
Other on-screen personnel
Role	Name
Commentators	Dave Prazak
Commentators	Jared David

=== Storylines ===
Glory by Honor V featured seventeen different professional wrestling matches in two separate nights that involved different wrestlers from pre-existing scripted feuds and storylines. Wrestlers were portrayed as either villains or heroes in the scripted events that built tension and culminated in a wrestling match involving.

The shows main event for night 1 featured KENTA & Naomichi Marufuji vs. The Briscoes (Jay Briscoe & Mark Briscoe). While the shows main event for night 2 featured Bryan Danielson vs. KENTA (with Davey Richards) for the ROH World Championship.

=== Background ===
It is also the fifth Glory by Honor event in Ring of Honor history.

== Results ==
Night 1: East Windsor
No.	Results	Stipulations	Times
1^{D}	Alex Payne defeated Bobby Dempsey	Singles match	—
2^{D}	Derek Dempsey defeated Mitch Franklin	Singles match	—
3	The Ring Crew Express (Dunn & Marcos) defeated Pelle Primeau & Rhett Titus	Tag team match	2:03
4	The Kings Of Wrestling (Chris Hero & Claudio Castagnoli) defeated The Ring Crew Express (Dunn & Marcos)	Tag team match	5:20
5	Jack Evans defeated Colt Cabana and Jimmy Jacobs (with Lacey) and Ricky Reyes	Four Corner Survival match	13:05
6	Nigel McGuinness defeated Christopher Daniels	Singles match	16:44
7	Austin Aries defeated Davey Richards	Singles match	17:07
8	Delirious defeated Shane Hagadorn	Singles match	6:22
9	Samoa Joe defeated Roderick Strong	Singles match	19:14
10	KENTA & Naomichi Marufuji defeated The Briscoes (Jay Briscoe & Mark Briscoe)	Tag team match	20:25
D / – this was a dark match

Night 2: New York City
No.	Results	Stipulations	Times
1	Davey Richards defeated Jack Evans	Singles match	7:35
2	Adam Pearce defeated Delirious	Singles match	8:18
3	Jimmy Jacobs (with Lacey) defeated Christopher Daniels and Colt Cabana	3-Way Dance	11:06
4	Homicide & Samoa Joe (with Julius Smokes) defeated The Briscoes (Jay Briscoe & Mark Briscoe)	Tag team match	18:00
5	The Kings Of Wrestling (Chris Hero & Claudio Castagnoli) defeated Generation Next (Austin Aries & Roderick Strong) (c)	Tag team match for the ROH World Tag Team Championship	21:34
6	Naomichi Marufuji (c) (with Mohammed Yone, Takashi Sugiura & Takeshi Morishima) defeated Nigel McGuinness	Singles match for the GHC Heavyweight Championship	23:32
7	Bryan Danielson (c) defeated KENTA (with Davey Richards)	Singles match for the ROH World Championship	33:01
(c) / – the champion(s) heading into the match

== See also ==
- List of Ring of Honor special events
- List of Ring of Honor pay-per-view events
