= Glory By Honor XI: The Unbreakable Hope =

Professional wrestling event

Glory by Honor XI: The Unbreakable Hope
- Promotion: Ring of Honor
- Date: October 13, 2012
- City: Mississauga, Ontario, Canada
- Venue: International Centre
- Attendance: 900

Pay-per-view chronology
← Previous; Death Before Dishonor X: State of Emergency	Next → Final Battle 2012: Doomsday

Glory By Honor chronology
← Previous; X	Next → XII

Glory By Honor XI: The Unbreakable Hope was the 11th Glory By Honor professional wrestling internet pay-per-view (iPPV) event produced by Ring of Honor (ROH). It took place on October 13, 2012, at the International Centre in Mississauga, Ontario, Canada.

== Production ==
Other on-screen personnel
Role	Name
Commentators	Kevin Kelly
Commentators	Nigel McGuinness

=== Storylines ===
Glory By Honor XI: The Unbreakable Hope featured professional wrestling matches which involved different wrestlers from pre-existing scripted feuds, plots, and storylines that played out on ROH's television programs. Wrestlers portrayed villains or heroes as they followed a series of events that built tension and culminated in a wrestling match or series of matches.

== Results ==
No.	Results	Stipulations	Times
1^{D}	Chaz Montana and Rip Impact defeated Mathieu St-Jacques and Mike Rollins	Tag team match	—
2	Caprice Coleman and Cedric Alexander defeated The Bravado Brothers (Harlem Bravado and Lance Bravado)	Tag team match	10:26
3	Mike Bennett (with Maria Kanellis) defeated Mike Mondo	Singles match	12:30
4	Wrestling's Greatest Tag Team (Charlie Haas and Shelton Benjamin) defeated B. J. Whitmer and Rhett Titus	Tag team match	11:48
5	Jay Lethal defeated Davey Richards	Singles match	24:08
6	TaDarius Thomas defeated Rhino (with Truth Martini)	Singles match	07:49
7	Adam Cole (c) defeated Eddie Edwards	Singles match for the ROH World Television Championship	19:57
8	S.C.U.M. (Jimmy Jacobs and Steve Corino) (c) defeated The Briscoe Brothers (Jay Briscoe and Mark Briscoe)	Tag team match for the ROH World Tag Team Championship	14:05
9	Kevin Steen (c) defeated Michael Elgin	Singles match for the ROH World Championship	31:46
(c) / – the champion(s) heading into the match; D / – this was a dark match

== See also ==
- Professional wrestling in Canada
