= Robert Evans (wrestler) =

Canadian professional wrestler

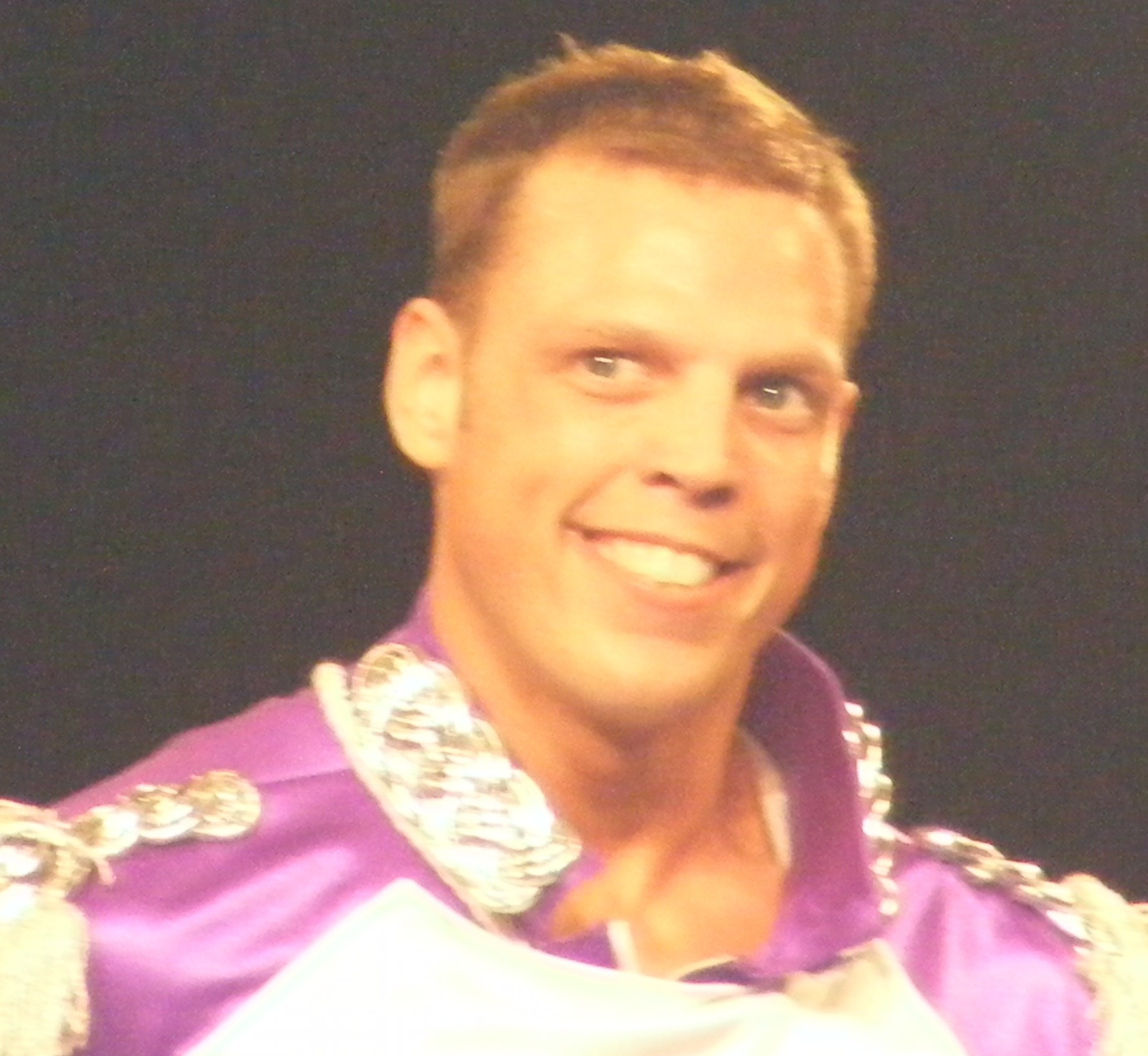
- Evans in 2011

Personal information
- Born: October 19, 1983 (age 42) Winnipeg, Manitoba, Canada

Professional wrestling career
- Ring name(s): Archibald Peck; Latvian Proud Oak; Mixed Martial Archie; The Mysterious and Handsome Stranger; R.D. Evans; Robert Evans
- Billed height: 1.90 m (6 ft 3 in)
- Billed weight: 90 kg (198 lb)
- Trained by: Skandor Akbar; Slam Shady
- Debut: February 10, 2001
- Retired: August 30, 2015

Robert Evans (born October 19, 1983) is a Canadian professional wrestler. He spent most of his career working for several independent promotions in Texas, but in 2011 also started working in the Northeastern United States, making his debut as a non-wrestling manager R.D. Evans for Ring of Honor (ROH) and as the marching band leader Archibald Peck for Chikara. Evans has also worked with WWE and Total Nonstop Action Wrestling (TNA) as a writer.

== Professional wrestling career ==
=== Texas independent circuit (2001–2010) ===
Evans, born in Winnipeg, Manitoba, Canada, was trained in professional wrestling by American wrestlers Skandor Akbar and Slam Shady, making the state of Texas his new home. He made his professional wrestling debut on February 10, 2001, facing Jonny Tek at a Super Stars of Wrestling (SSOW) event in Sulphur Springs, Texas. Evans spent the next several years working exclusively on the Texas independent circuit, winning several titles, including the SSOW Cruiserweight Championship, the NWA Texas Junior Heavyweight Championship, and the Full Effect Wrestling (FEW) and Southwest Premier Wrestling (SPW) Tag Team Championships with his "Full House" tag team partner Matt Palmer.

On February 26, 2005, Evans made his debut for Arlington, Texas-based Professional Championship Wrestling (PCW) in a losing effort against B.J. Turner. Evans won his first title in PCW just two months later on May 6, when he defeated Mace Malone in a No Disqualification match to win the PCW Uncut Heavyweight Championship. On May 21, Evans first successfully defended the Uncut Heavyweight Championship against Jerry Brown and then defeated J.T. LaMotta and Stephen Murphy in a three-way match to also win the PCW Cruiserweight Championship. Evans lost the Cruiserweight Championship to James Johnson the following August. On December 9, 2005, Evans lost the Uncut Heavyweight Championship to Trey Man in a four-way elimination match, which also included Chris Richter and Triple XXX-treme. However, the following day, he defeated Claudia, Damien, J.T. LaMotta and Wally Darkmon in a five-way Tables, Ladders, and Canes match to regain the PCW Cruiserweight Championship. He again lost the title to James Johnson on March 11, 2006, in a Hair vs. Hair match, which meant that Evans was also, as a result, shaved bald. On September 23, Evans teamed with Johnson to defeat Aaron Eagle and Wally Darkmon for the PCW Uncut Tag Team Championship. However, the rivals decided they could not reign together, which led to a match seven days later, where Evans and Eagle defeated Johnson and Darkmon to become the new PCW Uncut Tag Team Champions. Evans and Eagle, dubbed collectively "Best Friends Forever", lost the title to Darkmon and Shadow on February 10, 2007. On April 12, 2008, Evans defeated Eagle in a TLC match to win the PCW Cruiserweight Championship for the third time.

On June 7, 2009, Evans began working for Austin, Texas-based Anarchy Championship Wrestling (ACW), where he, during the next sixteen months, became a one-time ACW Heavyweight Champion and a three-time ACW U-30 Young Gun Champion.

=== Ring of Honor (2010–2014) ===
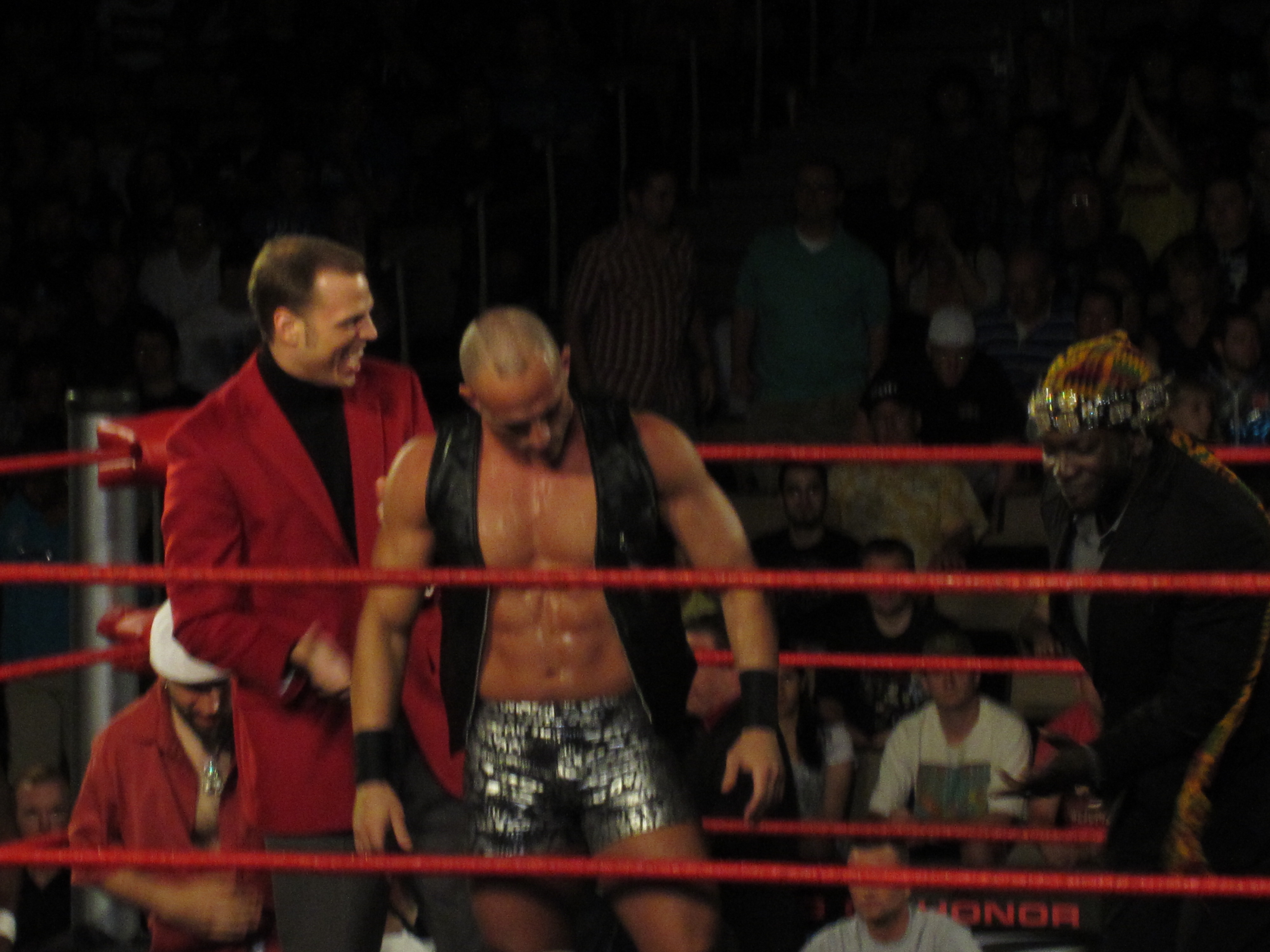
R.D. Evans with The Embassy

On March 27, 2010, Evans made his debut for Ring of Honor (ROH), working in a dark match, where he, David E. Jones and Ryan Stone were defeated by Johnny Goodtime, Johnny Yuma and Mike Sydal. On January 22, 2011, Evans, under the ring name "Barrister" R.D. Evans, made his television debut at the Ring of Honor Wrestling tapings, where he was unveiled as one of the new members of Prince Nana's The Embassy stable. Though he has not wrestled a single match for ROH since his dark match, Evans has been a part of several storylines involving The Embassy, including filing a lawsuit against Homicide, accusing him of attempted murder, assault and battery, attempted sexual assault and battery, sexual harassment and intentional infliction of emotional distress, and making various business deals for the stable, including one that resulted in its name being changed to The Embassy Limited, all with a goal of making Tommaso Ciampa a champion. However, after Prince Nana struck a deal with Truth Martini and cost Ciampa his match for the ROH World Television Championship against House of Truth member Roderick Strong, Ciampa turned on Nana at the June 29 tapings of Ring of Honor Wrestling, dissolving The Embassy Limited and making Evans his new primary manager. Evans continued managing Ciampa until August, when Ciampa was sidelined with a torn anterior cruciate ligament (ACL).

On the October 20 episode of Ring of Honor Wrestling, Evans ended his partnership with Ciampa and named Q.T. Marshall his new manager. Meanwhile, Evans started a storyline rivalry with former boss, Prince Nana, and, after suffering multiple attacks at the hands of Nana, filed a restraining order against him. After Nana once again attacked Evans at the November 3 tapings of Ring of Honor Wrestling, ROH's new matchmaker, Nigel McGuinness, booked the two former associates in a match against each other for Final Battle 2012: Doomsday. At the internet pay-per-view on December 16, Evans was victorious, following outside interference from Q.T. Marshall. After the match, the returning Tommaso Ciampa tried to get his hands on Evans, but was held back by security. In April 2013, Evans began wrestling more regularly for ROH, first revealing himself as Q.T. Marshall's surprise partner at Supercard of Honor VII on April 5, where they were defeated by A. C. H. and TaDarius Thomas, and then teaming with Marshall to defeat Alabama Attitude (Corey Hollis and Mike Posey) at a Ring of Honor Wrestling taping the following day. The team of Evans and Marshall was eventually named "Marshall Law".

Following Marshall's departure from ROH, Evans began working regular singles matches and in January 2014, entered a storyline, where he began gloating about his win streak, which he dubbed the "New Streak", although all of his wins came over jobbers or by disqualification over serious wrestlers like Michael Elgin and Roderick Strong. In August, Evans and his manager Veda Scott were joined by Moose, who helped Evans extend his win streak in tag team matches. However, on November 15 at Glory By Honor XIII, Moose turned on Evans, costing him his match for the ROH World Television Championship against Jay Lethal and ending the "New Streak" in the process. This led to a grudge match on December 7 at Final Battle 2014, where Moose defeated Evans, when Veda Scott also turned on him and joined Moose as part of Prince Nana's new Embassy. Evans has not returned to ROH since.

=== Chikara (2011–2015) ===
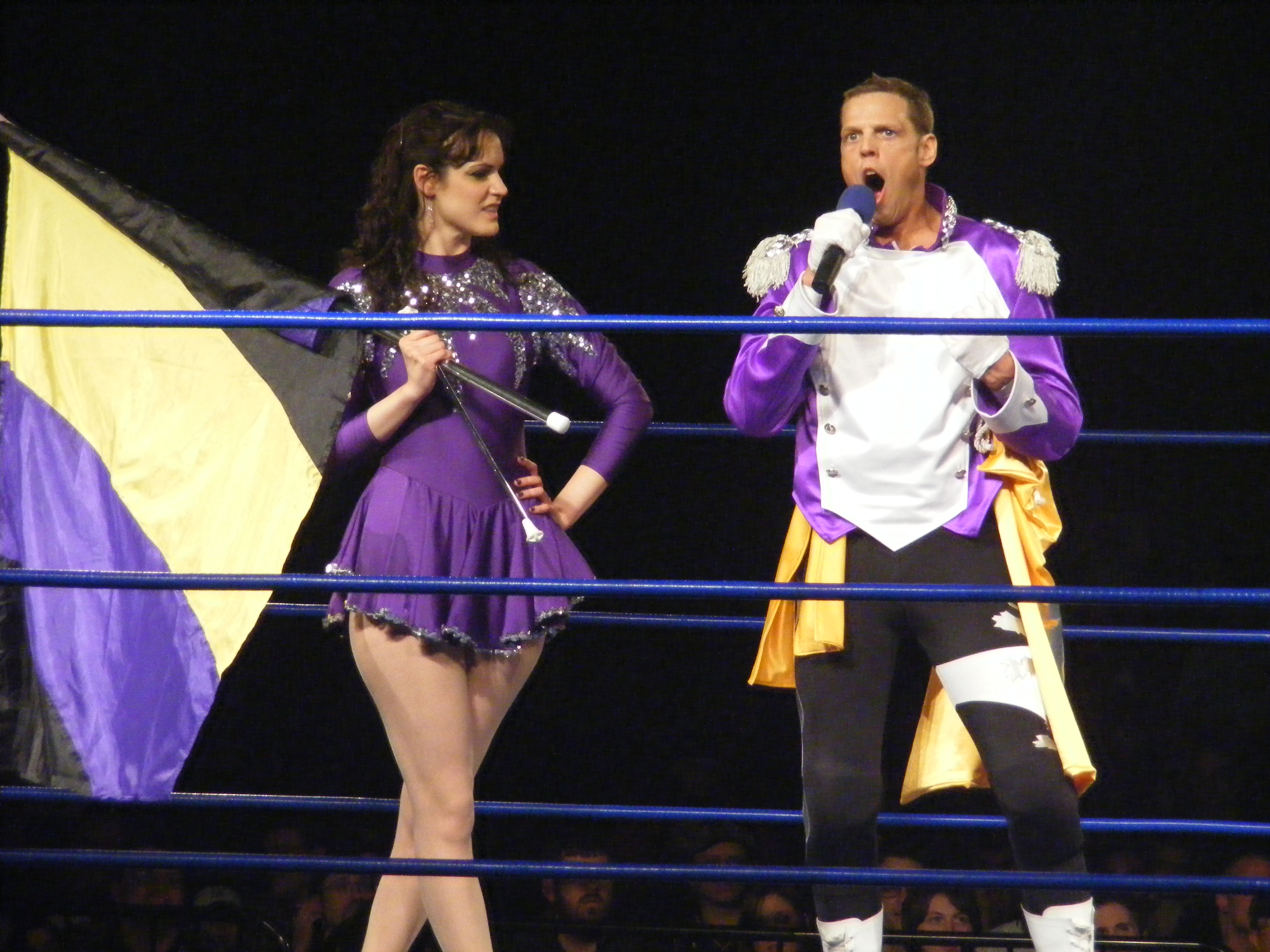
Archibald Peck and Veronica in April 2011

On January 28, 2011, Philadelphia, Pennsylvania-based Chikara began airing videos on the promotion's official YouTube channel, hyping the upcoming debut of "The Band". The videos eventually led to Evans' debut as marching band leader Archibald Peck, accompanied by his majorette Veronica. In his debut appearance on March 12, Peck was defeated by Eddie Kingston. Peck picked up his first win in his second match on April 16, when he defeated Colt Cabana in an open challenge, after hitting him with his baton. Peck later claimed that he had been able to defeat Cabana because Eddie Kingston's finishing maneuver, the Backfist to the Future, had actually sent him to the future, where he had bought a sports almanac and found out who would be answering his challenge. During the following months, Peck started a win streak, defeating Frightmare, Sugar Dunkerton and Dasher Hatfield through further cheating. On August 27, Peck entered the ninth annual Young Lions Cup tournament. Despite being over the age limit of both the tournament and the title it was contested for, Peck was allowed to enter the tournament thanks, in storyline, to his attorney R.D. Evans. Peck advanced from his first round four-way elimination match by defeating Mat Fitchett, Milo Shizo and MK McKinnan. However, later that same event, Peck was defeated in his semifinal match by Osaka Pro Wrestling representative Tadasuke, who went on to win the entire tournament, ending his win streak in the process. After another loss to UltraMantis Black on October 7, Peck returned to his winning ways the following day by defeating Chase Owens. During the weekend, Peck and Veronica also debuted their new mascot, Colt Cabunny, a parody version of Colt Cabana that had previously appeared for Chikara in early 2006. After claims that Peck was mistreating Cabunny, including using him for animal testing to find a cure for male pattern baldness, a match was made between Peck and Cabana for Chikara's first internet pay-per-view High Noon on November 13. At the pay-per-view, Peck was defeated by Cabana, when Cabunny turned on him and hit him with a baton.

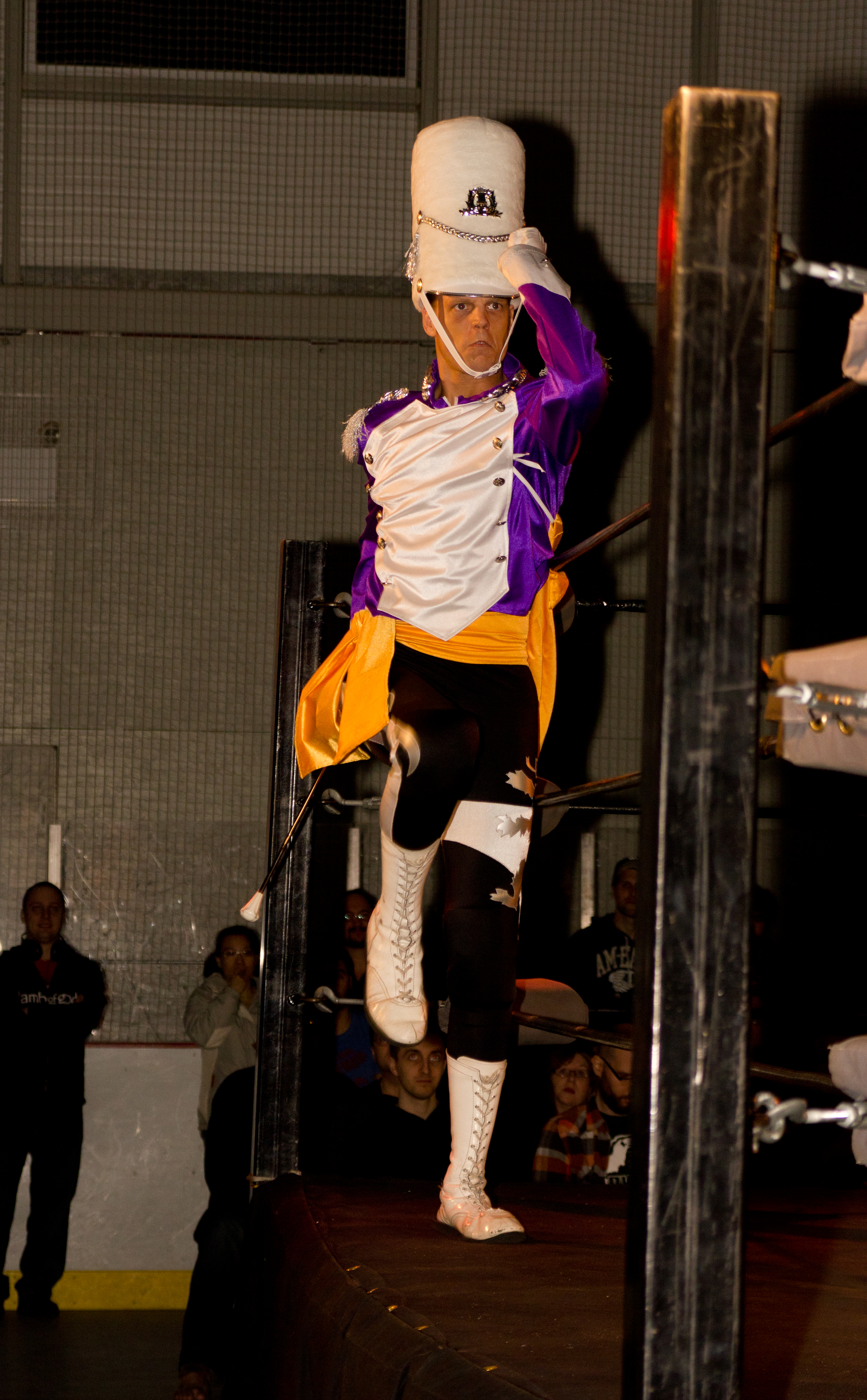
Peck making his entrance in March 2012

Peck started off 2012 with a losing streak against Hallowicked, Sara Del Rey, Ophidian, Dasher Hatfield, and Chuck Taylor, which led to Veronica, who had begun showing interest in Chikara newcomer "Mr. Touchdown" Mark Angelosetti, breaking off the relationship between herself and Peck, resulting in Peck becoming a fan favorite in the process. Peck then turned into Mixed Martial Archie, adopting a gimmick of a mixed martial artist in an attempt to show Veronica that he could be tough and a winner. However, Peck's debut under his new persona ended in another loss, when he was disqualified for excessive punishment, after refusing to stop ground-and-pounding Mark Angelosetti, after Veronica had walked out and started to flirt with him. While Archie ended his losing streak on April 28 in a match against Kobald, he was unable to win back Veronica, who instead aligned herself with Angelosetti. On June 2 at Chikara's second internet pay-per-view, Chikarasaurus Rex: How to Hatch a Dinosaur, Archie teamed up with former rival Colt Cabana to take on Angelosetti and his Throwbacks tag team partner Dasher Hatfield in a Loser Leaves Town match, where the loser of the fall would have to leave Chikara. After being dropped onto the ramp with a spinebuster by Angelosetti, Archie left the match temporarily only to return as Archibald Peck. However, at the end of the match, while the referee was distracted, Angelosetti hit Peck with his football helmet, after which Hatfield pinned him for the win. Following the match, Veronica kissed her new boyfriend Angelosetti, while the dejected Peck walked out of the arena. Following the event, Chikara started a series titled Where in the World is Archibald Peck? on its YouTube page, with each episode depicting Peck walking, in his wrestling gear, to somber music in different major cities across the United States. The series aired weekly until July 20, when Peck reached the outskirts of Dallas, Texas.

Peck returned to Chikara on July 28, now working under a mask as "The Mysterious and Handsome Stranger", a Texan gimmick based on Dusty Rhodes, defeating Icarus in a singles match. He then started a win streak, defeating The Shard, Grizzly Redwood, Tim Donst, and Lancelot Bravado in singles matches. On September 14, The Stranger entered the 2012 King of Trios tournament, teaming with Osaka Pro Wrestling representative Mihara and Tito Santana. The trio was, however, defeated in their first round match by The Spectral Envoy (Frightmare, Hallowicked and UltraMantis Black), who went on to win the entire tournament. Prior to the match, The Stranger came face-to-face with Veronica, who had just managed the Throwbacks in their first round match and who, in storyline, was impressed with the southern gentleman yet unable to recognize the man under the mask. Following the tournament, Peck continued his singles match win streak over deviAnt and Walter Eaton. Following his win over Eaton, The Stranger made a veiled challenge towards Mark Angelosetti. The Stranger's win streak ended on November 10, when he was pinned by Angelosetti in a four tag team elimination match, during which Touchdown also killed his pet bird Sapphire. The following day, The Stranger was defeated by Angelosetti in a singles match via disqualification. On December 2 at Chikara's third internet pay-per-view, Under the Hood, The Mysterious and Handsome Stranger was crowned Chikara's homecoming king. After a dance with the homecoming queen, Veronica, he dumped pig slop over her, before unmasking, revealing his true identity.

Peck's backstory at this point was explained in a video on the Wrestling Is YouTube channel published on December 31, 2012, where his barrister R.D. Evans presented his case for reinstatement to Chikara Director of Fun Wink Vavasseur, claiming that after Peck was given a spinebuster on the stage at Chikarasaurus Rex, he got into a backstage altercation with Eddie Kingston and, after being given a Backfist to the Future, was transported back in time to 1885. Living as a cowboy, Peck received another back fist from a fellow cowboy, Buford "Mad Dog" Tannen, which resulted in him being transported forward in time to after the show, meaning that the Archibald Peck who was pinned by Dasher Hatfield was not the real Peck, who should therefore be reinstated. According to Evans, there were now two Archibald Pecks; the one who was pinned at Chikarasaurus Rex and later wandered around in the "Where in the World is Archibald Peck?" videos and the one who returned under his cowboy persona The Mysterious and Handsome Stranger, a paradox that would be fixed when the real Peck receives another Backfist to the Future and is sent back to Chikarasaurus Rex to finish his match. On February 9, 2013, Peck defeated Mark Angelosetti in a No Disqualification match in the main event of Chikara's first event of the year to end the rivalry. The following day, Peck started a new rivalry with Tim Donst, who aligned himself with Veronica after getting himself disqualified following a low blow in his match against Peck. Peck and Donst faced off in a rematch on March 9, which also ended in a disqualification, when Steve "The Turtle" Weiner entered the ring and attacked Peck, aligning himself with Donst, Veronica and Jakob Hammermeier. Another rematch between the two took place on April 6, when Peck scored a decisive win. On May 18, Peck received his first shot at the Chikara Grand Championship, but was defeated by the defending champion, Eddie Kingston. Towards the end of the match, a second Peck appeared on one of the arena's balconies, distracting the Peck wrestling the match, who was then once again hit with the Backfist to the Future, which was followed by lights going out in the arena. When the lights came back on, both Pecks were gone and the match was ended via referee stoppage.

Peck returned on February 1, 2014, during the second National Pro Wrestling Day. The event concluded with the culmination of an eight-month-long storyline, where the Flood, a united group of rudos from Chikara's past, tried to destroy the final remnants of the promotion, which had been inactive since June 2013. During a brawl between the group and members of the Chikara roster, Peck arrived on the scene with 3.0 in a DeLorean, which led to the rudos retreating and Chikara claiming victory and announcing its return. On May 25 at Chikara's return event, You Only Live Twice, Peck worked in a singles match, where he was defeated by Jimmy Jacobs, the leader of the Flood, following outside interference. In 2014, Evans also began working Chikara events under his masked Latvian Proud Oak character, which had originated in Chikara's "Wrestling Is" sister promotions. In September, Peck teamed up with 3.0 for the 2014 King of Trios. The team made it to the semifinals of the tournament, before losing to the eventual tournament winners, the Devastation Corporation (Blaster McMassive, Flex Rumblecrunch and Max Smashmaster). On October 26, Peck took part in a brawl between Chikara and the Flood, during which Deucalion hit him with his chokebreaker finishing move. Afterwards, Peck was carried backstage by members of the Chikara roster, continuing a season long storyline, where victims of Deucalion's chokebreaker were "killed" and not seen in the promotion again.

Peck returned to Chikara at the season 15 finale on December 5, 2015. Continuing the time travel storyline, he appeared during a segment presenting the 2015 Chikara Yearbook, grabbed the book and was devastated by reading about his own demise at the hands of Deucalion.

=== WWE (2013, 2016–2019) ===
Evans' first WWE appearance came on the September 13, 2013 airing of SmackDown, taped September 10 at the Canadian Tire Centre in Ottawa, taking part in an interview segment where he was slapped by Ryback.

On October 20, 2016, Pro Wrestling Insider reported that Evans was working for WWE as part of the creative team. Evans' second on-screen WWE appearance also came courtesy of a backstage segment, this time on the June 11, 2018 edition of Raw in a confrontation with the Riott Squad in which Ruby Riott cut off his tie. On April 6, 2019, during the WWE Hall of Fame ceremony, Vince McMahon became infuriated when his name was mentioned during a speech Evans was producing. McMahon began yelling at Evans, which led to Evans quitting WWE.

=== Impact Wrestling / Total Nonstop Action Wrestling (2019–2024) ===
On October 17, 2019, it was reported by Fightful that Evans had joined Impact Wrestling as a writer and producer. He resigned in May 2024.

=== All Elite Wrestling (2024–present) ===
After Evans resigned from TNA, he began to work with All Elite Wrestling on June 8, 2024.

== Championships and accomplishments ==
- Anarchy Championship Wrestling
  - ACW Heavyweight Championship (1 time)
  - ACW U–30 Young Gun Championship (3 times)
- Full Effect Wrestling
  - FEW Tag Team Championship (1 time) – with Matt Palmer
- Monarchy Championship Wrestling
  - MCW Heavyweight Championship (1 time)
- National Wrestling Alliance
  - NWA Texas Junior Heavyweight Championship (1 time)
- New Age Wrestling Alliance
  - NAWA Heavyweight Championship (1 time)
- Professional Championship Wrestling
  - PCW Cruiserweight Championship (3 times)
  - PCW Uncut Heavyweight Championship (1 time)
  - PCW Uncut Tag Team Championship (2 times) – with James Johnson (1) and Aaron Eagle (1)
- Pro Wrestling Illustrated
  - PWI ranked him #348 of the top 500 singles wrestlers in the PWI 500 in 2011
- Southwest Premier Wrestling
  - SPW Tag Team Championship (1 time) – with Matt Palmer
- Super Stars of Wrestling
  - SSOW Cruiserweight Championship (1 time)
- Universal Wrestling Federation
  - UWF Cruiserweight Championship (2 times)
- XCW Pro Wrestling
  - XCW Tag Team Championship (1 time) – with Hugh Rogue

== Luchas de Apuestas record ==
Winner (wager)	Loser (wager)	Location	Event	Date	Notes
James Johnson (hair)	Robert Evans (hair)	Arlington, Texas	PCW live event	March 11, 2006	(Note: Also contested for the PCW Cruiserweight Championship.)
