= Will Ferrara =

American professional wrestler (born 1991)

Personal information
- Born: William Ferrara; June 30, 1991 (age 35) Queens, New York, New York, U.S.

Professional wrestling career
- Ring name(s): Will Ferrara; Spartan
- Billed height: 5 ft 9 in (1.75 m)
- Billed weight: 178 lb (81 kg)
- Trained by: Johnny Rodz; Taz
- Debut: July 1, 2006

William Ferrara (born June 30, 1991) is an American professional wrestler, He is signed to Total Nonstop Action Wrestling (TNA) as a producer. He is best known tenure for Ring of Honor (ROH) and on the indies by his ring name Spartan. He also makes appearances on the independent circuit.

== Professional wrestling career ==
=== Ring of Honor (2013-2021) ===
He made his debut in Ring of Honor on a dark match on September 6, teaming with Cheeseburger and Nick Merriman and winning his match against Aaron Solo, Mike Dean & Travis Banks. He competed for the first time on pay per view at Glory by Honor XII, on October 26, against The Romantic Touch in a losing effort. Then he started to wrestle with Bill Daly, forming "Team Benchmark". Their first tag team match occurred on February 22, and lost against War Machine (Hanson & Ray Rowe). They lost on April 18 at Future of Honor against The Briscoe Brothers. On September 29, he eliminated Jay Lethal during a battle royal. This allowed him to face Lethal later in the night for the ROH World Television Championship but he failed. On November 7, he lost his qualifying match for the 2015 Survival of the Fittest tournament against Tommaso Ciampa.

In January 2015, he participated at the 2015 edition of Top Prospect Tournament, where he beat J.Diesel and Beer City Bruiser before losing against Donovan Dijak in the finals. On June 20, he competed and won his match against Silas Young after a distraction from Dalton Castle but lost his grudge match at Death Before Dishonor XIII. On October 24, Ferrara got defeated by Adam Cole at the Glory By Honor XIV.

In 2017, Ferrara turned heel by turning on his longtime tag team partner Cheeseburger and formed a new team named "The Dawgs" with Rhett Titus.

== Championships and accomplishments ==
- Pro Wrestling Illustrated
  - Ranked No. 220 of the top 500 singles wrestlers in the PWI 500 in 2015
  - UWC Year-End Award
    - Newcomer of the Year (2011)
- Warriors of Wrestling
  - WOW Tag Team Championship (2 times) - with All-Star Lou (1) and Nero (1)
  - Shot At Glory Tournament (2011)
