= Veda Scott =

American professional wrestler

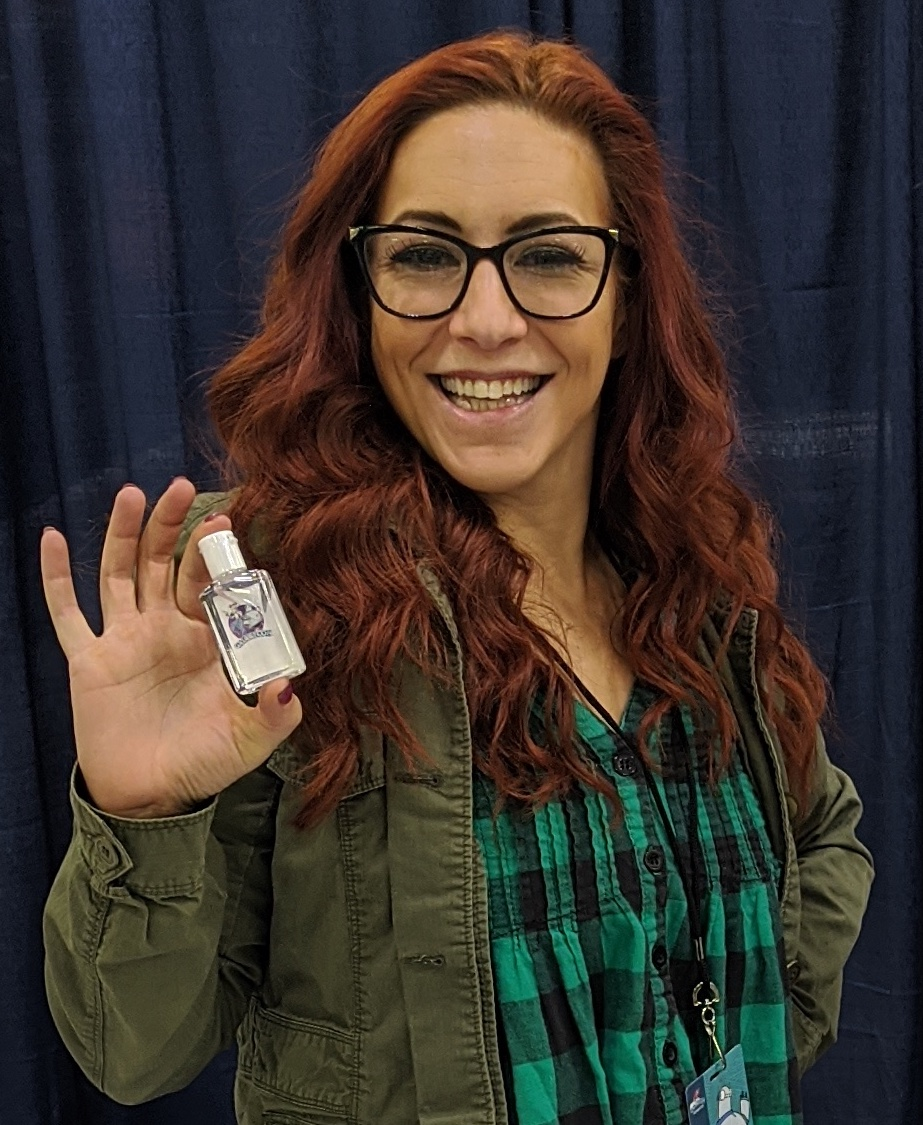
- Scott in 2019

Personal information
- Born: January 1, 1984 (age 42) Providence, Rhode Island, U.S.
- Spouse: Mike Bailey (m. 2022)

Professional wrestling career
- Ring name: Veda Scott
- Billed height: 5 ft 1 in (1.55 m)
- Billed weight: 114 lb (52 kg)
- Billed from: Providence, Rhode Island
- Trained by: Daizee Haze; Delirious
- Debut: May 15, 2011

Veda Scott (born January 1, 1984) is an American professional wrestler and color commentator. They (Note: Scott uses they/them and she/her pronouns. This article uses they/them for consistency.) have wrestled for various American promotions, including Ring of Honor (ROH), DDT Pro-Wrestling (DDT), Total Nonstop Action Wrestling (TNA), Shimmer Women Athletes, and Absolute Intense Wrestling (AIW). They have also wrestled internationally in Canada and Japan including Tokyo Joshi Pro-Wrestling (TJPW), Revolution Pro Wrestling (RevPro), and Defiant Wrestling. They have also provided commentary for various promotions including Game Changer Wrestling (GCW), New Japan Pro-Wrestling (NJPW), Juggalo Championship Wrestling (JCW), Consejo Mundial de Lucha Libre (CMLL), Deadlock Pro-Wrestling (DPW), and All Elite Wrestling (AEW).

== Professional wrestling career ==
=== American independent circuit (2011–2014) ===
Scott debuted in May 2011. Their earliest recorded match took place on May 15, 2011, at a Horizon Wrestling Alliance event, where they were defeated by Daizee Haze.

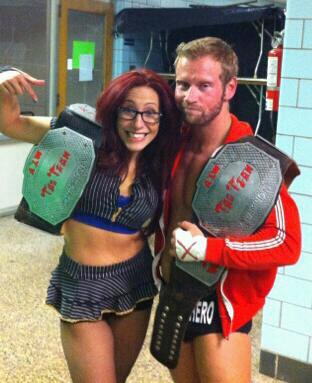
Scott, with Gregory Iron as the AIW Tag Team Champions

Scott started wrestling for Absolute Intense Wrestling (AIW) on July 29, 2011, with a loss to Cherry Bomb at Girls Night Out 4. In the second half of 2012, Gregory Iron employed Scott as his legal counsel, and they helped him implement a stipulation that he, the "Handicapped Hero", could only be pinned with a count of four instead of the standard three. On November 23, 2012, at Hell on Earth 8, Iron and Scott defeated defending champions The Batiri (Kodama and Obariyon) to capture the AIW Tag Team Championship. Known together as Hope and Change, they were known to have won and defended their title through nefarious means, and thus racked up successful title defenses against various teams including the Batiri, Youthanazia (Josh Prohibition and Matt Cross), the Old School Express (Jock Samson and Marion Fontaine) and the Jollyville Fuck-Its (Russ Myers and T-Money). Hope and Change remained champions until Absolution VIII on June 30, 2013, when they lost their titles back to the Batiri.

On March 1, 2013, at Girls Night Out 8, Scott won the main event ladder match against Addy Starr, Athena and Crazy Mary Dobson to earn a future shot at the AIW Women's Title. On October 6, 2013, at Girls Night Out 10, Scott lost their main event championship match against AIW Women's Champion Allysin Kay. On February 7, 2014, at #TGIF, Scott lost a rematch for the title to Kay. Scott's tag team with Iron started to fracture in November 2013, resulting in their feuding with each other. This culminated in Scott defeating Iron in the main event steel cage match at Battle of the Sexes on July 26, 2014.

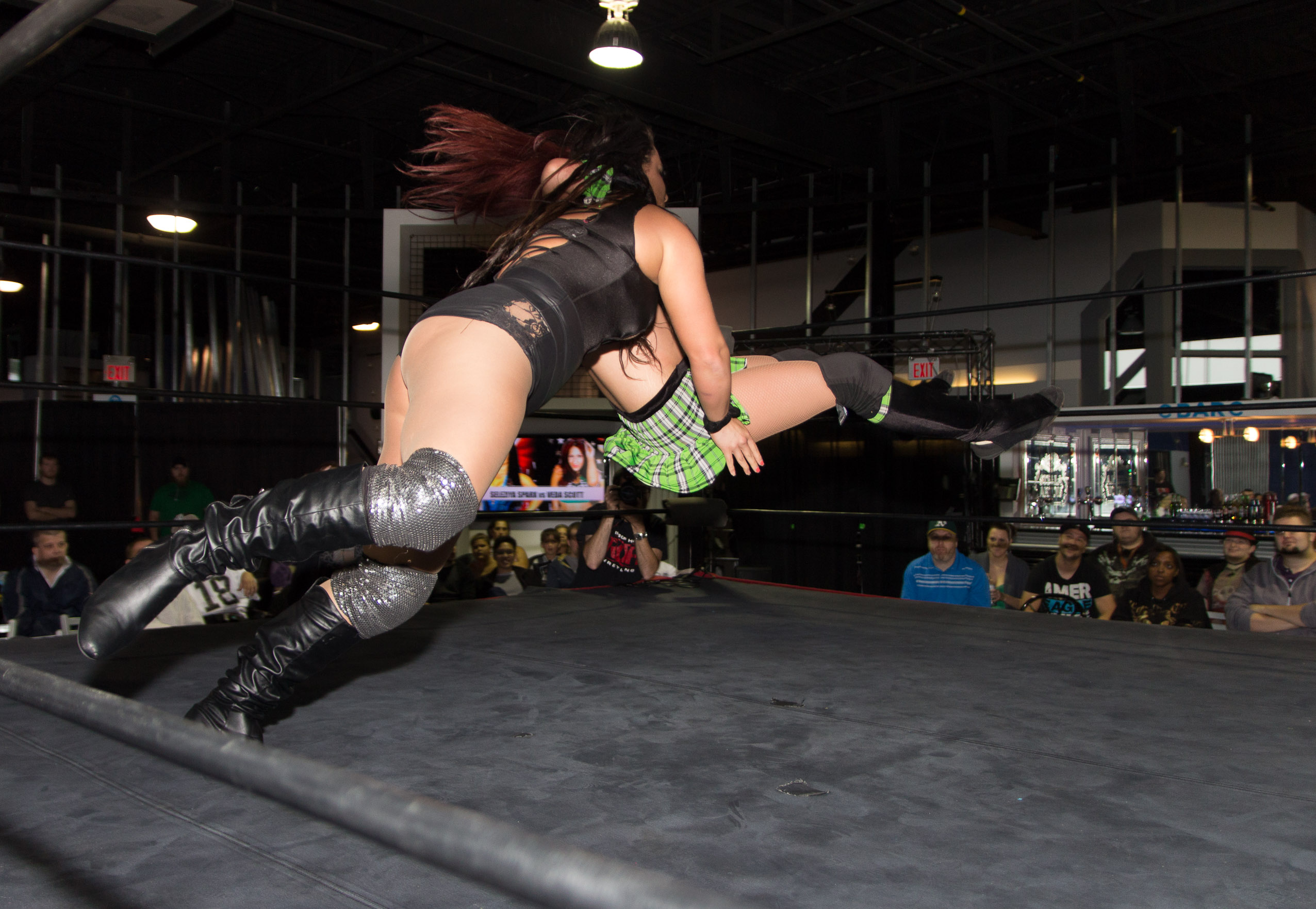
Veda Scott executing the bulldog portion of the Springboard bulldog on her then Ring of Honor co-worker Seleziya Sparx at Smash Wrestling's Canusa Classic show at the E-Zone in Mississauga, ON in 2013

In July 2012, Scott debuted for Shine Wrestling at the Shine 1 Internet pay-per-view, where they defeated Kimberly.

On May 10, 2014, Scott made their debut for Total Nonstop Action Wrestling at the tapings of TNA's One Night Only Knockouts Knockdown pay-per-view, where they lost to Gail Kim.

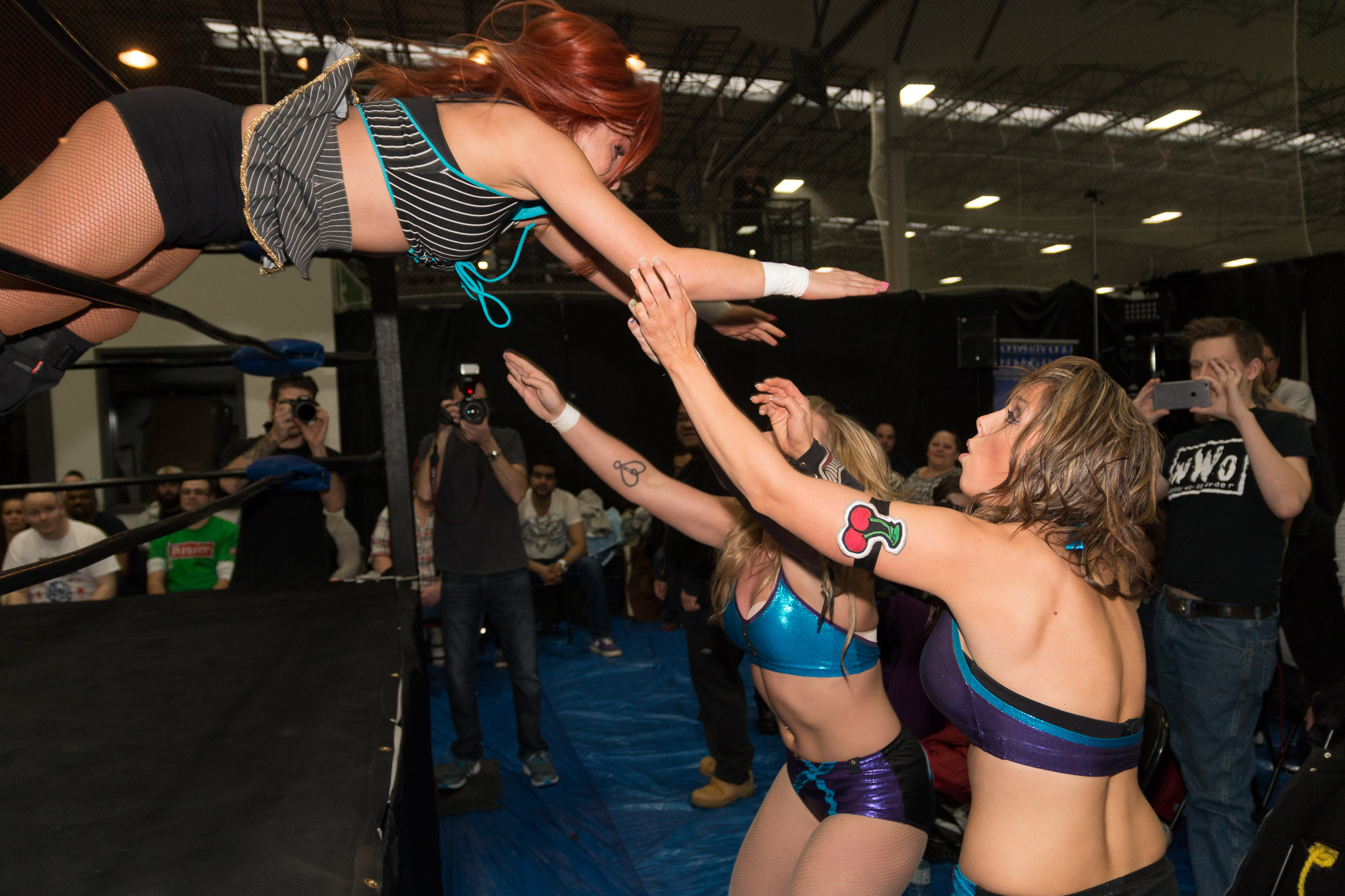
Veda Scott hitting the suicide dive on Kimber Lee and Cherry Bomb (right) at Smash Wrestling's The Usual Suspects show at the Canlan Sportsplex in Mississauga, ON in 2014

=== Shimmer Women Athletes (2011–2018) ===
Scott joined Shimmer Women Athletes in October 2011, when they wrestled an un-aired tag team match before the DVD tapings of Volume 41 and Volume 42. Scott's first aired match for Shimmer came about on Volume 44 that same month, where they lost a singles match to Taylor Made. On Volume 46, Scott gained their first victory after their opponent Saraya Knight was disqualified.

=== Ring of Honor (2012–2016) ===
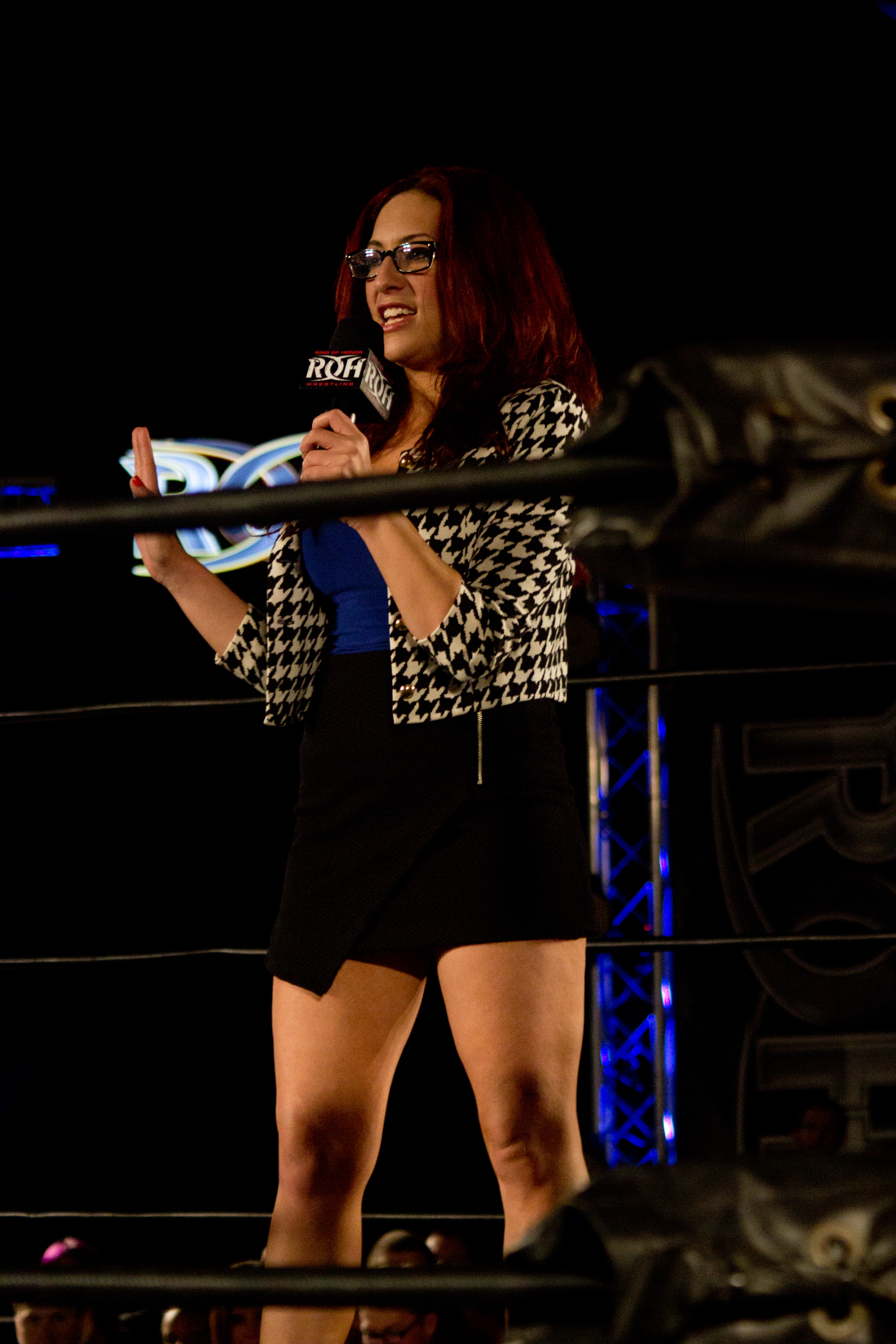
Scott speaks at a Ring of Honor event in 2014

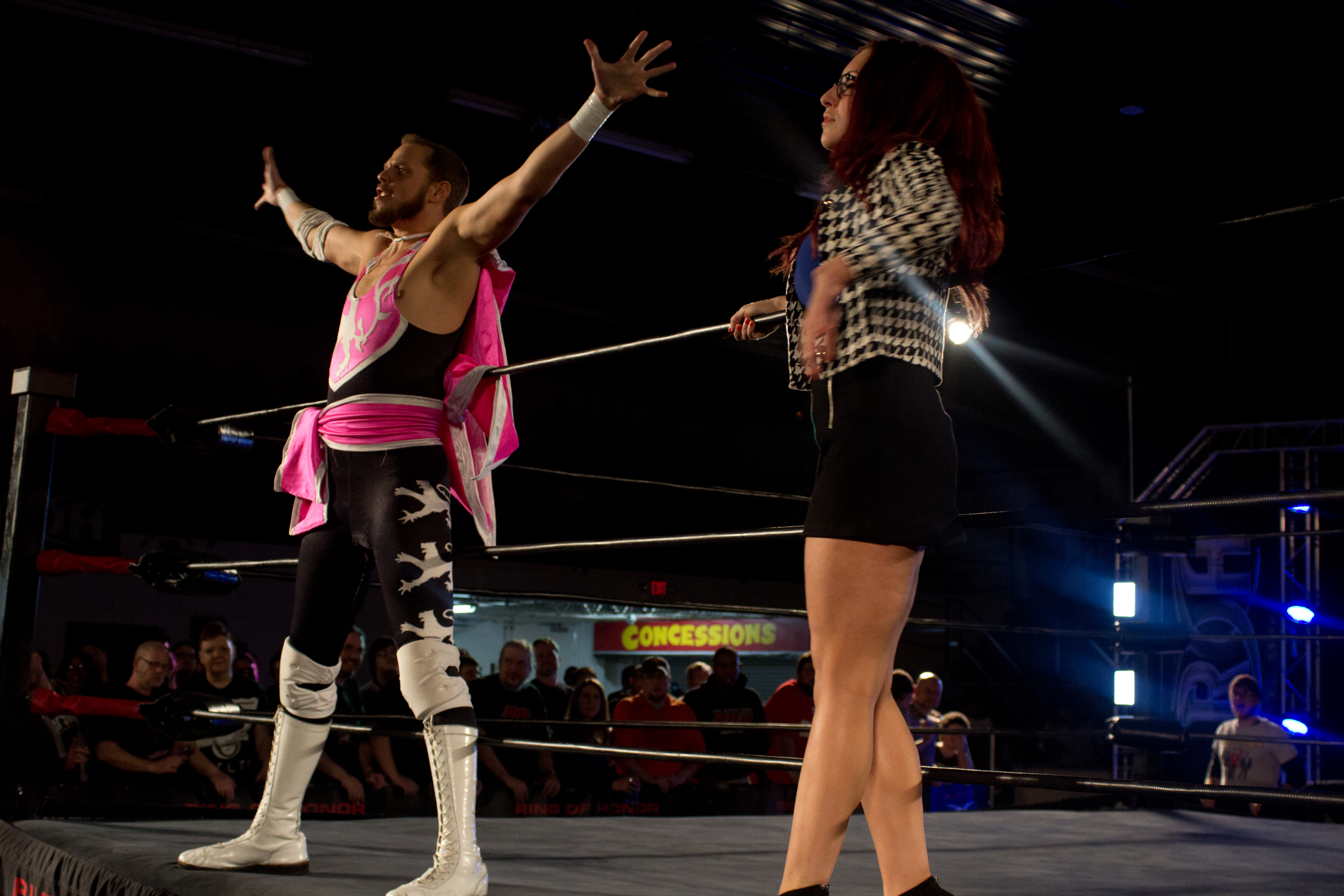
Veda Scott managing R.D. Evans in year 2014 in Ring of Honor

Scott was trained in Ring of Honor's (ROH) Wrestling Academy under Daizee Haze and Delirious.

In January 2012, Scott debuted in ROH as a backstage interviewer, playing this role throughout 2012 and into 2013, including on ROH's television episodes. From February 2013, in addition to their interviewing duties, Scott began working as a commentator for the female wrestlers' matches in ROH. On the March 23, 2013 episode of ROH Wrestling, Scott was taken hostage by the group S.C.U.M., who only released them upon agreeing to a deal for matches featuring S.C.U.M. vs the ROH roster on the next episode. At the Supercard of Honor VII internet pay-per-view, Scott helped ward off interference from S.C.U.M. during S.C.U.M. member Kevin Steen's ROH World Title match against Jay Briscoe, eventually leading to Briscoe capturing the title.

On the April 6, 2013 episode of ROH Wrestling, Scott interviewed MsChif, who had just lost for the first time since their return. In response, MsChif attacked Scott by spraying mist into their face. On the May 25, episode of ROH Wrestling, Scott vowed revenge and their interference cost MsChif a singles match. On the July 7, 2013 episode of ROH Wrestling, Scott had their first televised match for ROH and lost to MsChif.

In January 2014, Scott entered a storyline, where they began managing R.D. Evans when he began gloating about his win streak, which he dubbed the "New Streak", As a part of storyline, they would put him in matches with jobbers in order to win easily. At the ROH Unauthorized presents: "Michael Bennett's Bachelor Party" pay-per-view, Scott teamed up with Heather Patera and Leah Von Dutch defeating Taeler Hendrix, "Crazy" Mary Dobson and Scarlett Bordeaux when Scott pinned Bordeaux after a back-drop driver.

Scott began acting as Cedric Alexander's manager at Best in the World 2015 after the latter attacked Moose who Scott had previously managed, turning heel in the process. On December 2, 2016, Ring of Honor announced that Scott requested their release from their contract.

=== International exploits (2012–present) ===
On July 7, 2012, Scott was noted to have wrestled in Canada for NCW Femmes Fatales, where they defeated Mary Lee Rose.

Scott wrestled their first match in Japan at Joshi for Hope IV on October 7, 2012, where they lost to Yuhi.

=== Total Nonstop Action Wrestling (2014, 2016) ===
On May 10, 2014, Scott made their debut for Total Nonstop Action Wrestling at the tapings of TNA's One Night Only Knockouts Knockdown pay-per-view, where they lost to Gail Kim. On November 7, 2014, PPV, Scott competed in TNA One Night Only: Knockouts Knockdown 2 losing to Gail Kim. On April 22, 2016, PPV, Scott competed in TNA One Night Only: Knockouts Knockdown 4 losing to Rosemary.

=== International Wrestling Syndicate (2017–present) ===
Scott made their IWS debut on August 5, 2017, at Scarred 4 Life, as Stefany Sinclair became the first-ever IWS Women's Champion by defeating Scott and Kath Von Goth, in the inaugural IWS Women's Title Three Way Match. On April 6, 2019, at Unstoppable, Addy Starr defeated Solo Darling and Scott in the first IWS Women's Championship international contest, held at White Eagle Hall in Jersey City, as part of GCW's The Collective. On October 16, 2021, at Scarred for Life, Scott defeated Addy Starr for the IWS World Women's Championship. On August 6, 2022, at Scarred 4 Life, Scott lost the title to Melanie Havok in a four-way match.

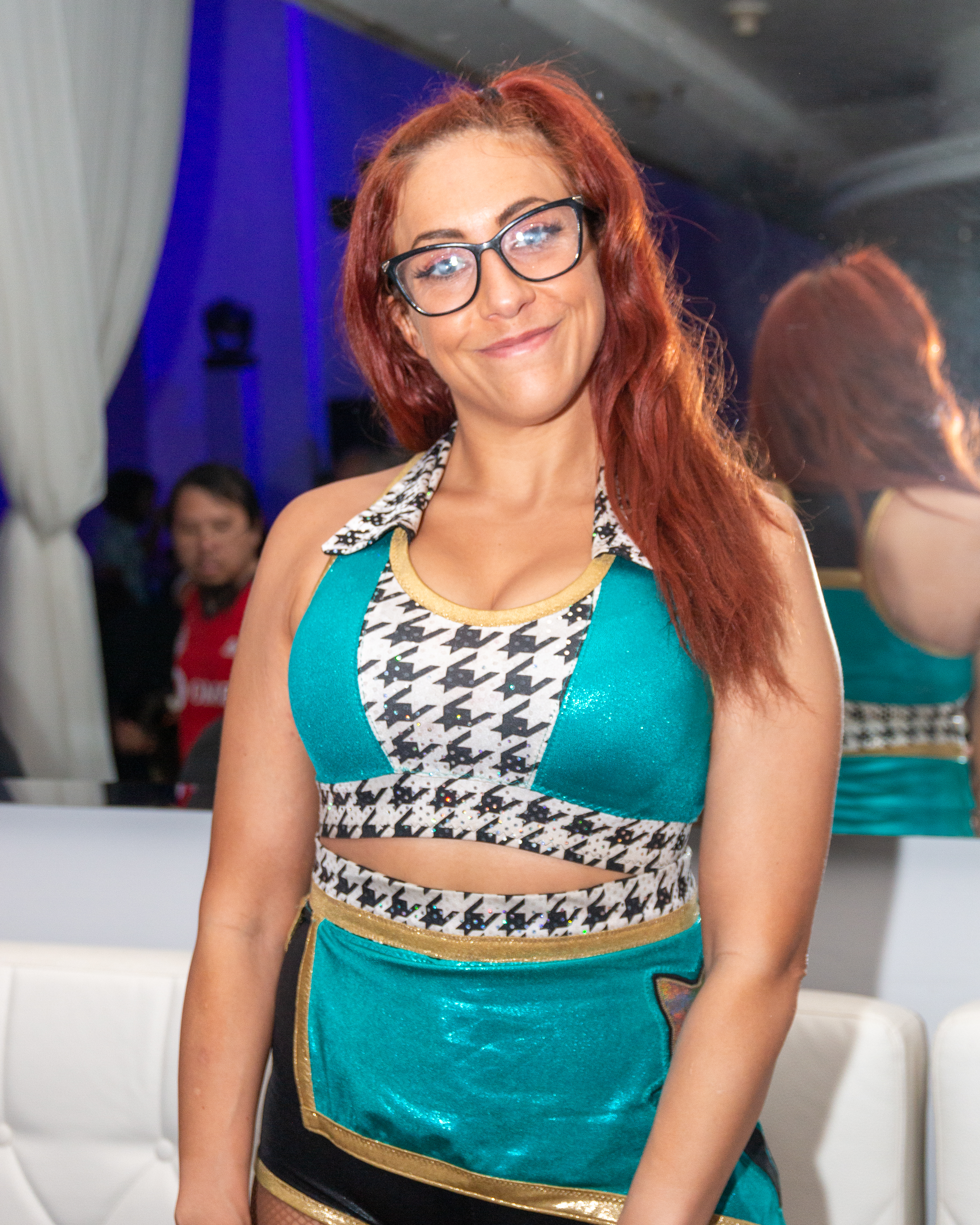
Veda Scott at Smash Wrestling's The Summit show in Toronto, ON in 2019

=== All Elite Wrestling (2020) ===
Scott was part of the commentary team for AEW's Women's Tag Team Cup Tournament: The Deadly Draw, which began on August 3, 2020. After the conclusion of the tournament, they joined the commentary team on AEW Dark.

== Personal life ==
Scott was studying law during their professional wrestling debut in 2011, and graduated from the Drexel University School of Law in 2012. They were also a former Drexel Law Review editor.

Scott is vegan. They are non-binary and use they/them and she/her pronouns. Scott became engaged to fellow professional wrestler Mike Bailey in 2020, and they were married in May 2022.

== Championships and accomplishments ==
- Absolute Intense Wrestling
  - AIW Women's Championship (1 time)
  - AIW Tag Team Championship (1 time) – with Gregory Iron
- DDT Pro-Wrestling
  - Ironman Heavymetalweight Championship (1 time)
- Family Wrestling Entertainment
  - FWE Women's Championship (1 time, final)
- Inspire Pro Wrestling
  - Inspire Pro XX Division Championship (1 time)
- International Wrestling Syndicate
  - IWS World Women's Championship (1 time)
- Legacy Wrestling
  - Legacy Wrestling Women's Championship (1 time)
- Pro Wrestling Illustrated
  - Rookie of the Year (2012)
  - Ranked No. 43 of the top 50 female wrestlers in the PWI Female 50 in 2013
