= Silas Young =

American professional wrestler (born 1980)

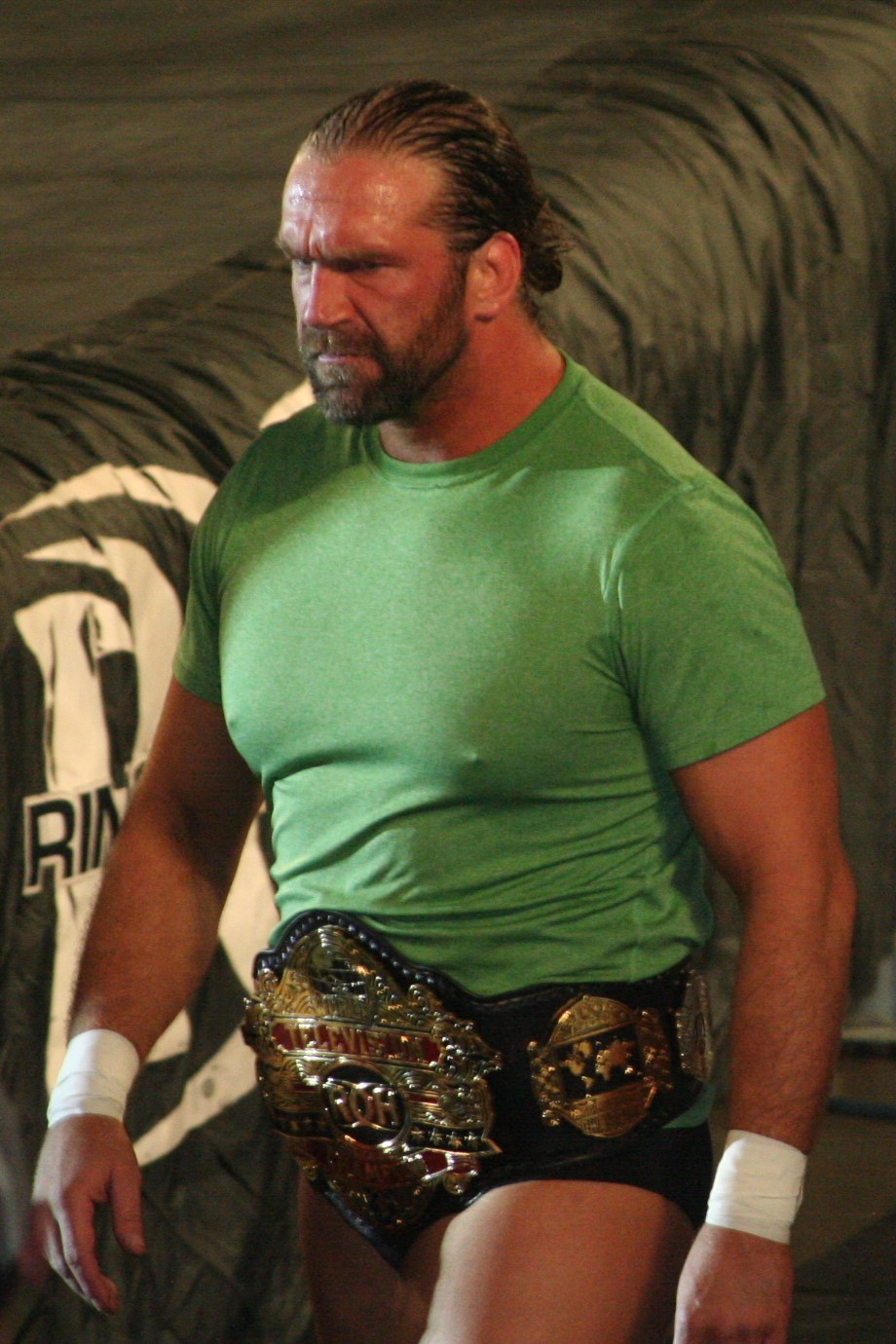
- Young as the ROH World Television Champion in 2018

Personal information
- Born: Caleb DeWall; September 8, 1980 (age 46) Wisconsin, U.S.

Professional wrestling career
- Ring name: Silas Young
- Billed height: 5 ft 11 in (1.80 m)
- Billed weight: 220 lb (100 kg)
- Billed from: Milwaukee, Wisconsin
- Trained by: Angel Armoni; Chris Bassett; Mike Mercury
- Debut: March 2, 2002

Caleb DeWall (born September 9, 1980) is an American professional wrestler, better known by his ring name Silas Young. currently performing on the independent circuit. He is best known for his time with Ring of Honor (ROH), where he is a former two-time ROH World Television Champion.

== Professional wrestling career ==
=== World Wrestling Entertainment (2007, 2010) ===
Young made his World Wrestling Entertainment debut on the September 24, 2007, episode of Heat, facing Val Venis in a losing effort. The next day he lost to The Miz in a singles match taped for Friday Night SmackDown!. Following these appearances, Young was signed to a developmental contract and assigned to Ohio Valley Wrestling. On December 5, Young made his OVW debut, defeating Seth Skyfire in a dark match before losing to James Curtis in a match for the Television Championship; however, Young was released from his contract shortly thereafter due to WWE briefly dropping its affiliation with OVW. Young later made an appearance for WWE on the February 25, 2010, episode of Superstars, where he lost to Luke Gallows.

=== Ring of Honor (2007–2021) ===
==== Early appearances (2007–2009) ====
On September 14, 2007, Young made his Ring of Honor debut at the promotion's Motor City Madness event, where he was defeated by Davey Richards. Following his debut, Young secured his first victory in ROH upon defeating Rhett Titus at Tag Wars on June 28, 2008. Young would then go on to occasionally compete throughout the rest of 2008 and 2009 before leaving ROH in mid-2009.

==== The Last Real Man (2012–2021) ====
Young would make his return to ROH on July 14, 2012, losing against Michael Elgin after a three-year-long absence. On September 15 at Death Before Dishonor X, he lost to Tadarius Thomas in a qualifying match for Survival of the Fittest 2012. He participated in Top Prospect Tournament in 2013. On January 5, he beat Adam Page and qualified for the next round. He was eliminated from the tournament by Matt Taven February 2. On March 2, at 11th Anniversary Show, he lost in a 'Six Man Mayhem match' for the benefit of A. C. H. On September 20, 2013, at Death Before Dishonor XI, Young lost to Jay Lethal.

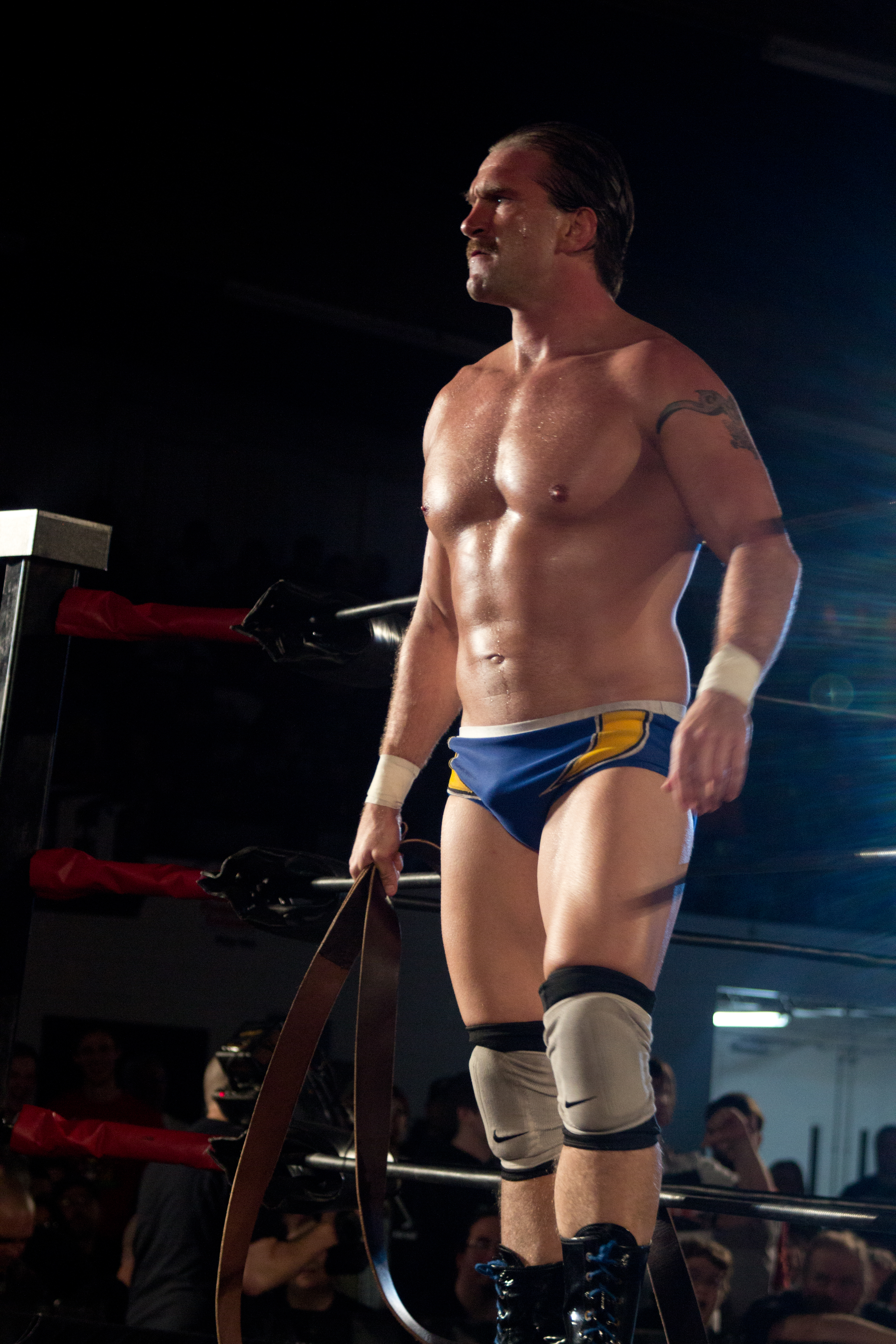
Young in 2014

On September 28, 2013, Young challenged anyone to beat him in a singles match. Mark Briscoe answered the challenge and proceeded to defeat Young. Later that evening, Young participated in a battle royal to determine who would receive a title shot for World Championship and was one of the final two participants before he was eliminated by Briscoe. After the match, he refused to shake hands with Briscoe and attacked him. The two subsequently began feuding and at Glory by Honor XII, Young defeated Briscoe. On November 15, Young lost to Mark's brother Jay. On December 14 at Final Battle 2013, their feud culminated when Young defeated Briscoe in a strap match. On January 4, Young competed against World Television Champion Tommaso Ciampa, but was unsuccessful in winning the title. After that match, former champion Matt Taven came to congratulate them, but Young refused to shake his hand and instead attacked him. As a result, Young and Taven wrestled against each other at the 12th Anniversary Show, where Taven was victorious. The next day however, Young responded with a victory over Taven as well as Caprice Coleman and Takaaki Watanabe. On March 8 at Raising the Bar - Night 2, Young defeated Taven following a distraction by Truth Martini. On May 10 at Global Wars, Young received another opportunity at the World Television Championship in a match also involving Taven, Tommaso Ciampa and Jay Lethal, but was again unable to win the title as Lethal retained it. After losing to Kevin Steen on June 22 at Best in the World 2014, Young rebounded with a victory over Matt Taven, Jimmy Jacobs and A. C. H. on July 12 to secure a title match for the World Championship. Six days later, Young continued his momentum by defeating Steen in a no disqualification match. Young was scheduled to face Cedric Alexander at All Stars Xtravaganza, but he suffered a broken leg and was out of action for nearly seven months. During his absence, a series of vignettes aired of Young giving out a PSA—a public Silas announcement—that largely criticized most men in today's culture, signifying a major push once Young came back from injury.

Young made his return from injury on March 13, 2015, in a losing effort to Will Ferrara after he hit Ferrara with a low blow. The following night, Young defeated Mark Briscoe, Matt Taven and Roderick Strong in a Proving Ground four-corner survival match to earn a title match with World Champion Jay Briscoe later that night. However, he was unsuccessful in defeating Briscoe for the title. After defeating his tag partner Takaaki Watanabe in May at Global Wars '15, he started a feud with Dalton Castle, surviving past Young's defeat in June at Best in the World 2015. The feud development about Young wanting to take Castle's boys and make them "real men". Castle agreed to a match at All Star Extravaganza VII with the stipulations that if he lost, Young would get the boys, while if Young lost, he would become one of Castle's boys. Castle subsequently lost the match, with Silas Young getting the boys. Young faced Castle in another losing effort at Final Battle, but despite the boys seemingly siding with Young in the weeks prior to the event, they rejoined Castle following the match.

On June 12, 2016, Young and the Beer City Bruiser defeated The Briscoes and The All Night Express in a three-way final to win the 2016 Tag Wars tournament. On July 1, Young announced his contract with ROH had expired. On September 17, 2016, Young won the Honor Rumble by eliminating Jay Lethal. On November 25, 2016, Young was added to the Final Battle 2016 match card and was put in a match versus Jyushin Thunder Liger. Young defeated Liger after hitting him with Misery. During 2017, Young had a feud against Jay Lethal, calling him the Golden Boy of ROH. At Supercard of Honor, Young defeated Lethal in a Last Man Standing match. At Final Battle on December 15, 2017, Young defeated Kenny King, Punishment Martinez and Shane Taylor in a Fatal four-way elimination match to win the ROH World Television Championship. Young lost the title to King on February 10, 2018, but won it back on April 7, 2018, by defeating King in a Last Man Standing match at Supercard of Honor XII. He lost the title again to Punishment Martinez on June 16, 2018, at Ring of Honor's State of the Art event in Dallas. He and Josh Woods formed Two Guys One Tag. On March 26, 2021, on ROH 19th Anniversary Show, Young turned on Woods splitting up the team.

=== All Elite Wrestling (2022–2023) ===
Young made his All Elite Wrestling debut on the June 22, 2022 episode of Dynamite, facing "Hangman" Adam Page in a losing effort. He then faced Powerhouse Hobbs on the April 12, 2023 episode of Dynamite, losing in a squash match.

== Personal life ==
During a 2011 interview, DeWall revealed that he had been a heroin addict prior to his professional wrestling career. He stated that training to become a professional wrestler allowed him to overcome his addiction and meet his wife. Although DeWall previously claimed to be the nephew of Stan Hansen, Hansen stated in an interview with Jim Ross that he and DeWall are not actually related.

In a 2017 interview with Solowrestling.com, DeWall revealed that his "Last Real Man" gimmick is inspired by his father's work ethic and physical appearance. Starting in mid-2019, DeWall began incorporating his real-life habit of tobacco smoking into his "Last Real Man" gimmick by smoking cigarettes after winning a match.

== Championships and accomplishments ==
- All American Wrestling
  - AAW Heavyweight Championship (2 times)
  - AAW Heritage Championship (1 time)
  - Allegiance Tag Team Tournament (2013) – with Jimmy Jacobs
- All-Star Championship Wrestling / NWA Wisconsin
  - ACW Heavyweight Championship (1 time)
  - NWA Wisconsin Heavyweight Championship (1 time)
- NWA Mid American Wrestling
  - MAW Junior Heavyweight Championship (1 time)
  - MAW Tag Team Championship (1 time) – with Zach Gowen
- NWA Midwest
  - NWA Midwest Heavyweight Championship (3 times)
- Pro Wrestling Illustrated
  - Ranked No. 73 of the top 500 singles wrestlers in the PWI 500 in 2018
- Real Canadian Wrestling
  - RCW British Commonwealth Championship (1 time)
- Ring of Honor
  - ROH World Television Championship (2 times)
  - Honor Rumble (2016)
  - Tag Wars (2016) – with The Beer City Bruiser
  - ROH Year-End Award (1 time)
    - ROH Feud of the Year (2017) vs. Jay Lethal
- UPW Pro Wrestling
  - UPW Heavyweight Championship (1 time)
- Xtreme Intense Championship Wrestling
  - XICW Tag Team Championship (1 time) – with Gavin Starr
- Pure Pro Wrestling
  - PPW Michigan State Heavyweight Championship (2 times)
