= Caprice Coleman =

American professional wrestler

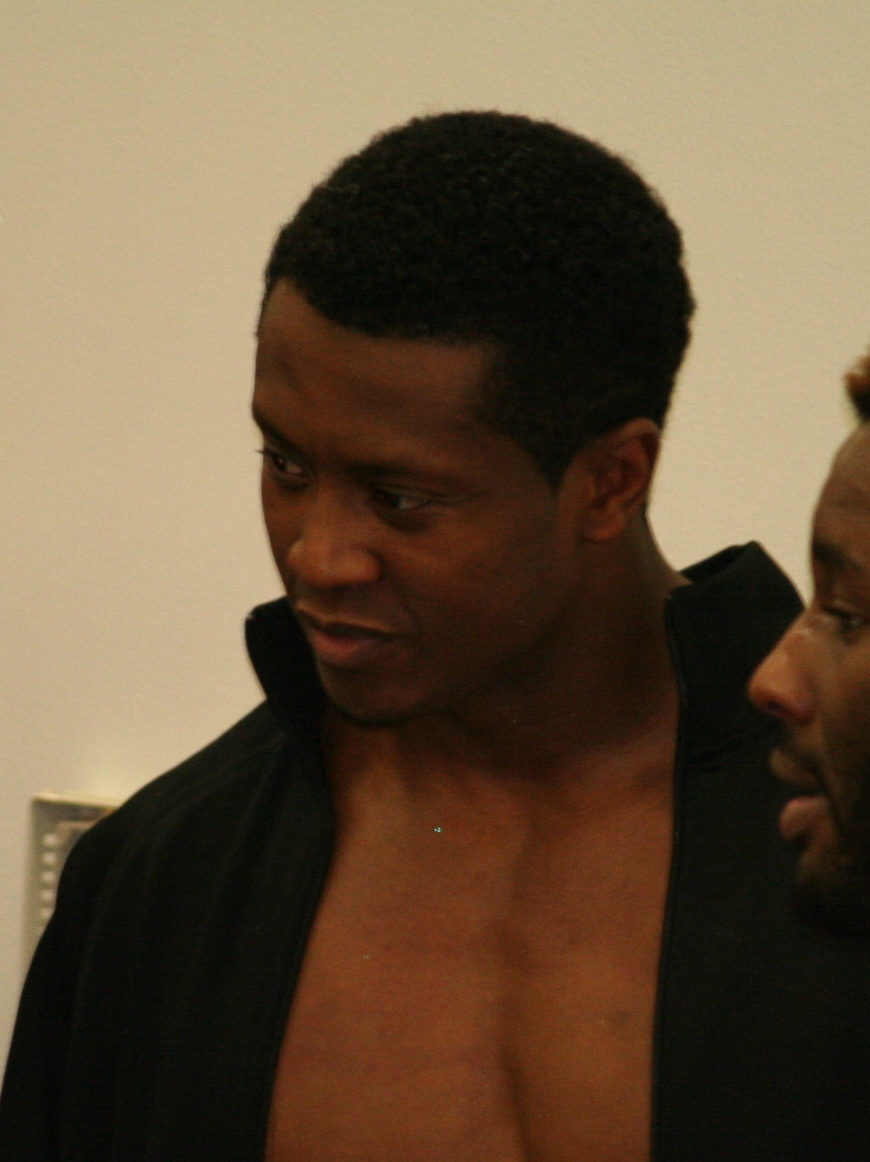
- Coleman in 2011

Personal information
- Born: March 20, 1977 (age 49) Jamaica, New York, U.S.

Professional wrestling career
- Ring name(s): Caprice Coleman; Ice
- Billed height: 5 ft 10 in (1.78 m)
- Billed weight: 213 lb (97 kg)
- Billed from: T-Town, North Carolina
- Trained by: Matt Hardy; Jeff Hardy
- Debut: 1996

Caprice Coleman (born 20 March 1977) is an American professional wrestler who is currently competed on the independent circuit. He is best known for his time in Total Nonstop Action Wrestling (TNA), Ring of Honor (ROH), NWA Wildside and CWF Mid-Atlantic. He has also made previous several appearances in WWE wrestling on WWE Heat and WWE Velocity.

== Professional wrestling career ==
=== Early career ===
Coleman began his career in the wrestling business as a referee and wrestler under the ringname of Ice in Organization of Modern Extreme Grappling Arts (OMEGA) where he was trained by Matt and Jeff Hardy. After the Hardys were signed by the World Wrestling Federation, Coleman moved on to NWA Wildside along with fellow OMEGA alumni Joey Matthews, Gregory Helms and Shannon Moore. He later won the NWA Georgia Junior Heavyweight Championship from Lazz on December 2, 2000. After a four-month reign, Coleman lost the title to J.C. Dazz at the NWA Wildside Arena in Cornelia, Georgia on March 29, 2001.

During the next several months, Coleman faced Havok, Dango Wynn, J.C. Dazz and Lazz. He lost to Jimmy Rave in a "Triple Threat" match with J.C. Dazz in a match for the title at the NWA Wildside Arena on April 21, 2001. Throughout the next year, he would also face Jeremy Lopez, Rainman and Jimmy Rave.

On June 29, 2002, Coleman defeated Cru Jones for the NWA Wildside Television Championship. A special stipulation to the match saw both men's valets Sweet Dreams and Destiny handcuffed together. Successfully defending the NWA Wildside Television Championship against Tony Mamaluke on July 6, he also took part in an 8-man "Loser Leaves NWA Wildside" match teaming with Sweet Dreams, Onyx and Kevin Hardner against Cru Jones, Tony Mamaluke, Malakai and Lazarus (with valets Destiny and Lisa) on June 22. Coleman pinned Jones to win the match and forced Jones to leave the promotion.

On November 26, 2003, Coleman made a one-time appearance in Total Nonstop Action Wrestling, losing to CM Punk and Julio Dinero in a tag team match with Roderick Strong. The match was later taped and aired on TNA Xplosion.

=== Ring of Honor and NWA Wildside ===
Coleman regained the NWA Wildside Television title defeating Rainman in a best "2-of-3 falls" match on January 3, 2004. A week later, he made his debut in ROH as a participant in a four-way match with Rainman, Todd Sexton and Jimmy Rave on January 10, 2004. At The Last Stand, he was in a "Six Man Mayhem" match with Chris Sabin, Slyk Wagner Brown, Sonjay Dutt, Jack Evans and Hydro on January 29. Coleman was eventually forced to surrender the NWA Television title the following month due to a spinal injury.

On March 13, he scored his first major victory over Rainman at Do or Die II. After the match, the two were approached by Julius Smokes to take part in the tag team Scramble match later that night. Facing three other tag teams (Fast Eddie and Don Juan, the Outcast Killaz and The Ring Crew Express), he and Rainman lost to Fast Eddie and Don Juan.

Leaving the promotion for NWA Wildside, he entered a championship tournament in an attempt to regain the still vacant NWA Television title but lost to Jason Cross in the finals on March 27. Appearing at World Title Classic, he took part in an interpromotional "Six Man Mayhem" match between Ring of Honor, NWA Wildside and IWA Mid South on June 12. The participants included Jimmy Jacobs (Ring of Honor), H. C. Loc and Matt Sydal (IWA Mid-South) and Delirious, Rainman and himself representing NWA Wildside. The match was won by Jimmy Jacobs.

On July 3, Coleman lost to NWA Wildside TV Champion Jason Cross in a four-way match with Jeremy V and Ray Gordy. He also made one last appearance in Ring of Honor losing to Colt Cabana at Do or Die III on July 17. A week later, while in the Christian Wrestling Federation, he defeated Scottie Wren for the CWF Heavyweight Championship in Rockwall, Texas on July 24. That same night, he also battled CWF Television Champion Mike Fox to a time-limit draw.

Later that year, he lost to Gabriel in a three-way match with Ray Gordy on October 30. Shortly before the close of Southern Championship Wrestling, Coleman lost to Krazy K for the vacant SCW Junior Heavyweight Championship in Durham, North Carolina. On December 6, he made his first appearance in World Wrestling Entertainment losing to Gene Snitsky on Monday Night Raw. The match would later be aired on WWE Heat.

On January 15, 2005, Coleman and Joey Silva defeated Xsirus and Lodi in Sanford, North Carolina. Scoring victories over Jeff Lewis, Masada and Chance Prophet during early 2005, he and Joey Silva also teamed up win the Live Action Wrestling's Gauntlet Series defeating The Macks (T.J. and Kirby "Krazy K" Mack) in the final match on February 26 and awarded the tag team titles. On March 5, he won a Mega Rumble to earn a title shot against NWA Wildside Heavyweight Champion Onyx, however he lost to him later that night. Two days later, Coleman made a second appearance on Monday Night Raw losing to Chris Masters and was later aired on WWE Heat.

Defeating Dexter Poindexter at an event for Combat Fusion on March 12, he returned to NWA Wildside losing to Ray Gordy on March 19. Teaming with Sal and Vito Thomaselli, he lost to Brandon Thomaselli, Todd Sexton and Tony Stradlin in a 6-man tag team match on April 16. On April 30, he and Tony Mamaluke defeated Todd Sexton and Tony Stradlin by double submission.

=== Independent circuit ===
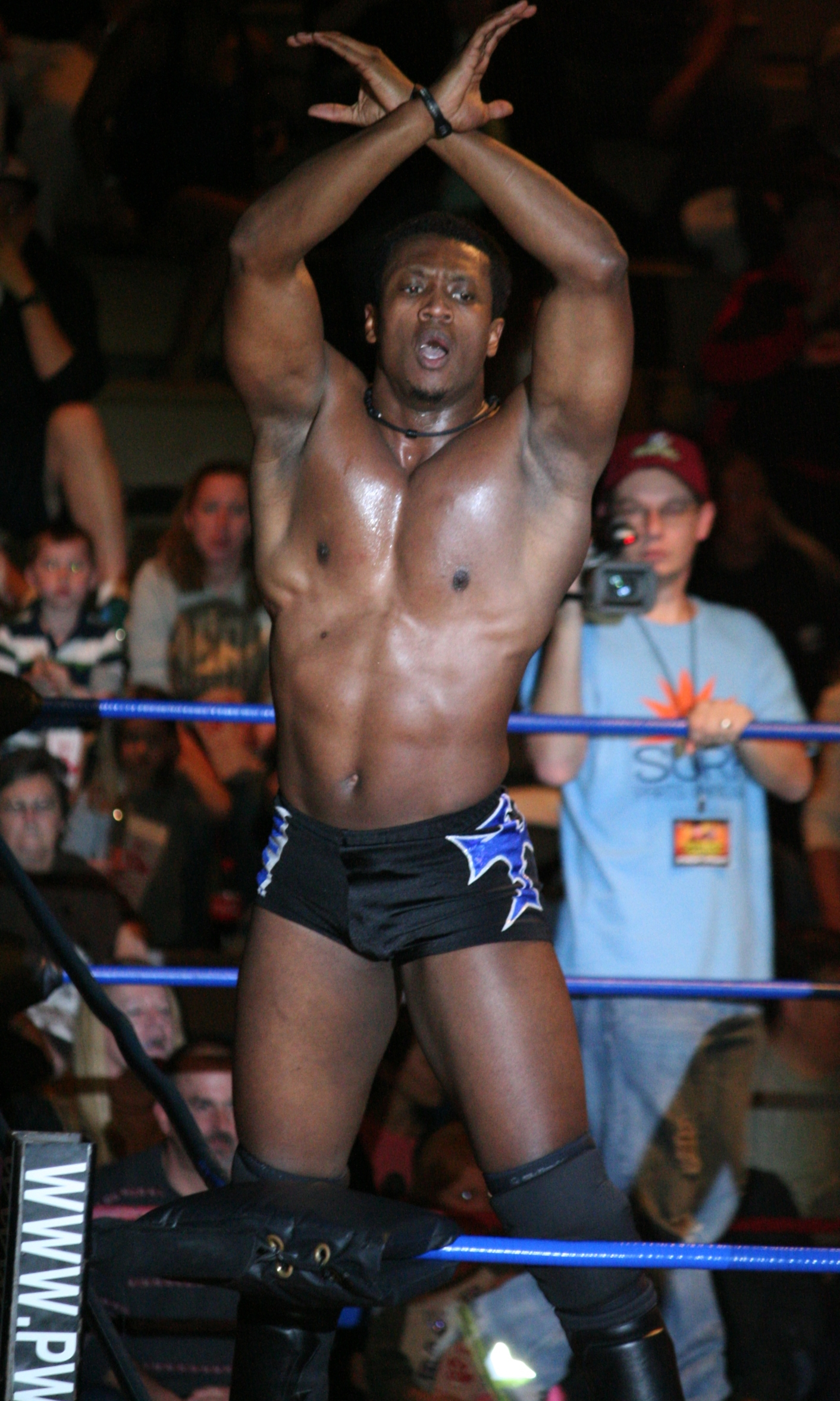
Coleman posing on the ring turnbuckles in January 2012.

After Wildside, Coleman went on to wrestle in the Christian Wrestling Federation and Live Action Wrestling full-time. On June 4, 2005, he and Garry Stevens defeated Xsirus and Brass Monkey on June 4. A month later, Coleman teamed with Kid Justice to face former tag team partner Joey Silva and Xsirus on July 23. On August 19, 2005, Coleman lost to Xsiris at an event for CWF Mid Atlantic in Burlington, North Carolina. The winner was to receive a shot at the AWA Light Heavyweight Championship. That same month, Coleman faced Doug "The Bash Man" Basham at the August 25 edition of SmackDown! which aired on WWE Velocity. In September, he and Michael Malick defeated Sweet Dreams and Son of Thunder for the CWF Tag Team titles.

Coleman lost to Dragon Fantastico on October 15 at a CWF event and, in LAW on November 12, he and Joey Silvia defeated Derrick Driver and Billy Jones. He and Silva participated in the main event later that night and lost the LAW Tag Team titles to Brad Hunter and Sean Alexander. On December 5, he lost to Ken Doane in a dark match on Raw. Several days later, he faced Simon Dean at SmackDown! which aired on WWE Velocity later that week.

On January 13, 2006, Coleman and Joey Silva teamed up with Jeff Hardy to defeat Tommy Gunn and the LAW Tag Team Champions Brad Hunter and Sean Alexander. Later that month, Coleman faced Jamie Noble in a match which later aired on Velocity on January 21. He also beat Jesse Ortega at a show for CWF Mid Atlantic on March 11.

On June 15, 2007, Coleman lost to Aiden Chambers and Darriel Kelly in a three-way dance with Mike Yamaha at the Dennis A. Wicker Civic Center in Sanford, North Carolina.

=== Return to ROH ===
On the January 6, 2011 Ring of Honor Newswire, it was announced that Coleman was to return to the company for the Richmond, Virginia and Charlotte, North Carolina shows on January 14 and 15, 2011, taking on Colt Cabana and Rhett Titus respectively. He then later joined Prince Nana's stable and started tag-teaming with Will Ferrara. Coleman has continued to work sporadically in ROH since then, competing both in singles or tag team competition as a heel.

In 2016 he formed "The Cabinet" with The All Night Express. On ROH TV The Cabinet defeated Jason Kincaid, Leon St. Giovanni and Shaheem Ali in the first round of the ROH World Six-Man Tag Team Championship. They were defeated by A. C. H., Jay White and Kushida in the second round. The Cabinet was originally portrayed as something not to be taken seriously, but in late 2016, the trio began portraying more serious elements and renamed themselves "The Rebellion", eventually adding Shane Taylor as a member. The Rebellion remained together until June 2017, when they were defeated by Search and Destroy in a match in which the losing team had to disband.

In October 2017, on Ring of Honor television, Coleman formed his own show called "Coleman's Pulpit," during which he interviewed wrestlers. Coleman is also a commentator on Ring of Honor television, alongside Ian Riccaboni.

== Championships and accomplishments ==
- America's Most Liked Wrestling
  - AML Championship (2 times)
- Christian Wrestling Federation
  - CWF Heavyweight Championship (1 time)
  - CWF Tag Team Championship (1 time) – with Michael Malick
- Live Action Wrestling
  - LAW Tag Team Championship (1 time) – with Joey Silvia
- Mainstream Wrestling Organization
  - MWO Lightweight Championship (1 time)
- National Championship Wrestling
  - NCW Light Heavyweight Championship (1 time)
- NWA Anarchy
  - NWA Anarchy Television Championship (1 time)
- NWA Wildside
  - NWA Georgia Junior Heavyweight Championship (1 time)
  - NWA Wildside Television Championship (2 times)
- Pro Wrestling Illustrated
  - PWI ranked him #188 of the top 500 singles wrestlers in the PWI 500 in 2014
- Qatar Pro Wrestling
  - QPW King of the Ladder Match Championship (3 times)
- Ring Time Wrestling
  - RTW Ringtime Lightweight Championship (1 time)
