= Supercard of Honor VIII =

Professional wrestling event

- Promotion: Ring of Honor
- Date: April 4, 2014
- City: Westwego, Louisiana
- Venue: John A. Alario Sr. Event Center

Event chronology
← Previous; 12th Anniversary Show	Next → Global Wars

ROH Supercard of Honor chronology
← Previous; VII	Next → IX

Supercard of Honor VIII was the 8th Supercard of Honor professional wrestling live event produced by Ring of Honor (ROH), which took place on April 4, 2014, at the John A. Alario Sr. Event Center in Westwego, Louisiana

== Production ==
Other on-screen personnel
Role	Name
Commentators	Kevin Kelly
Commentators	Steve Corino
Commentators	Nigel McGuinness

=== Storylines ===
Supercard of Honor VIII featured professional wrestling matches that involved different wrestlers from pre-existing scripted feuds, plots, and storylines that played out on ROH's television programs. Wrestlers portrayed villains or heroes as they followed a series of events that built tension and culminated in a wrestling match or series of matches.

The main feud going into the event was between Adam Cole and Jay Briscoe to be the undisputed ROH World Champion, Briscoe (who won the title at Supercard of Honor VII) was previously ROH World Champion, had his title vacated from him in July due to a shoulder injury. At Death Before Dishonor XI, Cole won a 16-man tournament to capture the vacant championship, after Briscoe returned he attacked Cole and claimed as he was never defeated for the title, he was still the true ROH World Champion.

The Decade (Roderick Strong, Jimmy Jacobs, and B. J. Whitmer) formed at Final Battle after longtime ROH wrestler Eddie Edwards had wrestled his last match in the company, all three came out and attacked Edwards announcing their new stable, informing everyone that they stood for honor which had long been forgotten, stating that they are against newcomers that don't show their respect, those who leave ROH, and those who leave and come back to ROH, and how they feel that as they have all been in ROH for 10 years, they don't get the respect they deserve. At State of the Art, Jacobs defeated Cedric Alexander and afterwards Alexander offered a hand shake, but Strong said that they do not shake the hands of disrespectful newcomers, then Whitmer took Alexander's bags from the locker room and threw them out, kicking Alexander out of the arena. At the 12th Anniversary Show, a 6-man tag team match between The Decade vs Briscoe, Page and Alexander occurred, during which Alexander used his new finisher The Lumbar Check (a backbreaker) (which is a move Strong is known for using) on Strong, but nonetheless The Decade picked up the win. Thus for Supercard of Honor VIII, it was announced that Alexander would face Strong.

It was announced that Kevin Steen will face Michael Elgin at Supercard of Honor VIII, with the winner receiving an IWGP Heavyweight Championship match against champion Kazuchika Okada at the ROH/NJPW War of the Worlds supershow in May.

At an ROH Wrestling TV taping, a match between The Briscoe Brothers against Adam Cole and Michael Bennett took place. During the match, Bennett speared Mark Briscoe through a table, resulting in a No Disqualification match between Mark and Bennett being announced for the show.

reDRagon (Bobby Fish and Kyle O'Reilly) lost the ROH World Tag Team Championship to The Young Bucks at Raising the Bar Night 2, now they will face the team of Hanson & Raymond Rowe and The Forever Hooligans in a 3-Way Tag Team match at Supercard of Honor VIII for a title match against The Young Bucks at War of the Worlds.

Tommaso Ciampa and Jay Lethal had been feuding on-and-off since 2012, beginning in a 2-out-of-3 Falls match, where Lethal successfully defended his ROH World Television Championship against Ciampa, during which Ciampa sustained a knee injury which took him out of wrestling for a year. Lethal subsequently lost his championship, and at Final Battle, Ciampa had won the title from Matt Taven. Lethal would then challenge Ciampa in a pair of title matches but both times Lethal seemingly had Ciampa pinned, but the referee was distracted, and did not see it. Ciampa and Lethal will now face off in a 2-out-of-3 Falls match for the title at Supercard of Honor VIII.

Under the management of Truth Martini, Matt Taven became the longest reigning ROH World Television Champion in history, engaging in a lifestyle of women and partying accompanied by two women named Scarlett and Seleziya (named the Hoopla Hotties). But at Final Battle, Taven lost to Tommaso Ciampa, who was able to capture his championship, Taven then began appearing without The House of Truth, and at Wrestling's Finest in a three-way match between Ciampa, Taven, and Jay Lethal the House of Truth appeared and Martini declared their "Hoopla" lifestyle dead, and that they needed to get serious and fired the Hotties. But Taven then told Martini that he had outgrew him, and during the match Martini pulled the leg of Taven causing him to lose the match. At several other matches of Taven, Martini interfered until Taven choked him, causing the referees to break it up, thus at Supercard of Honor VIII, Matt Taven will face a mystery wrestler brought in by Martini.

The Decade has also been feuding with other greenhorns, Andrew Everett and Adrenaline Rush (A. C. H. & TaDarius Thomas) and recently they have taken a greenhorn they had previously been feuding with named Adam Page, and while they do not consider him an official member, have taken them under their wing, thus at the event Everett and Adrenaline RUSH will face Jacobs, Whitmer, and Page.

R.D. Evans has recently returned to ROH with his manager Veda Scott, and Evans has not yet lost a match since his return, and thus they have created the New Streak (a parody of the famous undefeated streak of WCW wrestler Goldberg.) And, as it is a parody of the Goldberg streak, they frequently exaggerate the number of wins Evans has, as each time he appears his win count is much higher, saying he frequently has "overseas" matches. After his most recent victory against The Romantic Touch, Evans flaunted over his victory and said he was the only real man in ROH, which caused the anger of Silas Young, who for his time in ROH has declared himself "the last real man in professional wrestling", and attacked Evans and Scott, thus at the event the Evans will put his 52-0 streak on the line against Young.

== Results ==
No.	Results	Stipulations	Times
1^{D}	Luke Hawx defeated Corey Hollis and Mike Posey and The Romantic Touch	Fatal 4-way match	—
2	Roderick Strong defeated Cedric Alexander	Singles match	10:27
3	The Decade (Adam Page, B. J. Whitmer, and Jimmy Jacobs) defeated Andrew Everett and Adrenaline Rush (A. C. H. and TaDarius Thomas )	Six-man tag team scramble match	10:16
4	R.D. Evans (with Veda Scott and Ramon) defeated Silas Young by disqualification	Singles match	10:59
5	Michael Bennett (with Maria Kanellis) defeated Mark Briscoe	No Disqualification match	9:14
6	reDRagon (Bobby Fish and Kyle O'Reilly) defeated Hanson and Raymond Rowe and Forever Hooligans (Alex Koslov and Rocky Romero)	Three-way tag team match for an ROH World Tag Team Championship match at War of the Worlds	13:49
7	Jay Lethal defeated Tommaso Ciampa (c) 2-0	2-out-of-3 falls match for the ROH World Television Championship	17:13
8	Michael Elgin defeated Kevin Steen	Singles match for an IWGP Heavyweight Championship match at War of the Worlds	19:13
9	Adam Cole (c) defeated Jay Briscoe	Ladder War V for the ROH World Championship	28:36
(c) / – the champion(s) heading into the match; D / – this was a dark match
