= ROH Supercard of Honor =

- Promotions: Ring of Honor
- First event: Supercard of Honor (2006)

ROH Supercard of Honor is a pay-per-view professional wrestling event annually presented by the U.S. based promotion Ring of Honor (ROH). First held in 2006, Supercard of Honor typically took place during the weekend of, and in the same metropolitan area as, WrestleMania, the flagship event of WWE and considered to be the biggest wrestling event of the year. That ceased being the case with the 2025 event, and now Supercard of Honor is held on its own weekend.

After annually running from 2006 to 2019 (with the exception of 2012), the event took a two-year hiatus due to the COVID-19 pandemic. The event returned in 2022 with Supercard of Honor XV, which was the first Ring of Honor pay-per-view produced under the creative direction of AEW president Tony Khan, whose purchase of ROH was completed two months later.

== Dates and venues ==
Event	Date	Venue	City	Main event	Notes
Supercard of Honor (2006)	March 31, 2006	Frontier Fieldhouse	Chicago Ridge, Illinois	Bryan Danielson (c) vs. Roderick Strong for the ROH World Championship	
Supercard of Honor II	March 31, 2007	Michigan State Fairgrounds & Expo Center	Detroit, Michigan	Typhoon (Cima and Susumu Yokosuka) and Shingo vs. Typhoon (Dragon Kid and Ryo Saito) and Masaaki Mochizuki in a Dragon Gate rules match	
Supercard of Honor III	March 29, 2008	Orlando Downtown Recreation Complex	Orlando, Florida	Typhoon (Cima, Dragon Kid and Ryo Saito) vs. Muscle Outlaw'z (Naruki Doi, Masato Yoshino and Genki Horiguchi) in a Dragon Gate rules match	
Supercard of Honor IV	April 3, 2009	George R. Brown Convention Center	Houston, Texas	Nigel McGuinness (c) vs. Jerry Lynn for the ROH World Championship	
Supercard of Honor V	May 8, 2010	Manhattan Center	New York City, New York	Tyler Black (c) vs. Roderick Strong for the ROH World Championship	(Note: Event did not take place during the week of WrestleMania)
Supercard of Honor VI	May 21, 2011	Frontier Fieldhouse	Chicago Ridge, Illinois	Eddie Edwards (c) vs. Roderick Strong for the ROH World Championship	
Supercard of Honor VII	April 5, 2013	Hammerstein Ballroom	New York City, New York	Kevin Steen (c) vs. Jay Briscoe for the ROH World Championship	
Supercard of Honor VIII	April 4, 2014	John A. Alario Sr. Event Center	Westwego, Louisiana	Adam Cole (c) vs. Jay Briscoe for the ROH World Championship	
Supercard of Honor IX	March 27, 2015	The Sports House	Redwood City, California	Jay Briscoe (c) vs. Samoa Joe for the ROH World Championship	
Supercard of Honor X	April 1, 2016	Hyatt Regency Dallas	Dallas, Texas	The Young Bucks (Matt Jackson and Nick Jackson) vs. The Motor City Machine Guns (Alex Shelley and Chris Sabin)	
Supercard of Honor X	April 2, 2016	Hyatt Regency Dallas	Dallas, Texas	Kyle O'Reilly vs. Adam Cole in a No Holds Barred match	
Supercard of Honor XI	April 1, 2017	RP Funding Center (Jenkins Arena)	Lakeland, Florida	The Hardys (Matt Hardy and Jeff Hardy) (c) vs. The Young Bucks (Matt Jackson and Nick Jackson) in a Ladder match for the ROH World Tag Team Championship	
Supercard of Honor XII	April 7, 2018	Lakefront Arena	New Orleans, Louisiana	Dalton Castle (c) vs. Marty Scurll for the ROH World Championship	
G1 Supercard	April 6, 2019	Madison Square Garden	New York City, New York	Jay White (c) vs. Kazuchika Okada for the IWGP Heavyweight Championship	
Supercard of Honor XV	April 1, 2022	Curtis Culwell Center	Garland, Texas	Jonathan Gresham (c) vs Bandido for the Undisputed ROH World Championship	
Supercard of Honor (2023)	March 31, 2023	Galen Center	Los Angeles, California	Claudio Castagnoli (c) vs Eddie Kingston for the ROH World Championship	
Supercard of Honor (2024)	April 5, 2024	The Liacouras Center	Philadelphia, Pennsylvania	Eddie Kingston (c) vs. Mark Briscoe for the ROH World Championship	
Supercard of Honor (2025)	July 11, 2025	Esports Stadium Arlington	Arlington, Texas	Bandido (c) vs. Konosuke Takeshita for the ROH World Championship	
Supercard of Honor (2026)	May 15, 2026	Wicomico Youth and Civic Center	Salisbury, Maryland	Athena (c) vs. Maya World vs. Trish Adora vs. Yuka Sakazaki vs. Billie Starkz vs. Zayda Steel for the ROH Women's World Championship	

== See also ==
- ROH annual events
