= Supercard of Honor IX =

Professional wrestling event

- Official promotional poster
- Promotion: Ring of Honor
- Date: March 27, 2015
- City: Redwood City, California, United States
- Venue: The Sports House
- Attendance: 1, 100

Event chronology
← Previous; 13th Anniversary Show	Next → War of the Worlds

ROH Supercard of Honor chronology
← Previous; VIII	Next → X

Supercard of Honor IX was the 9th Supercard of Honor professional wrestling live event produced by Ring of Honor (ROH), which took place on March 27, 2015, at The Sports House in Redwood City, California.

== Production ==
Other on-screen personnel
Role:	Name:
Commentators	Adam Cole
Commentators	Kevin Kelly

=== Storylines ===
This professional wrestling event features eight professional wrestling matches, which involve different wrestlers from pre-existing scripted feuds, plots, and storylines that played out on ROH's television programs. Wrestlers portrayed villains or heroes as they followed a series of events that built tension and culminated in a wrestling match or series of matches.

Talent from New Japan Pro-Wrestling (NJPW), with whom ROH has a talent exchange agreement, also appeared at the event.

At 13th Anniversary Samoa Joe returned to Ring of Honor in his first appearance since 2008. Samoa Joe came out and cut a promo laying claim to the ROH World Heavyweight Championship, challenging World Champion, Jay Briscoe in the process.

On March 28 addition of Ring of Honor television, The Decade members B. J. Whitmer and Adam Page came out to the ring and cut a promo on Steve Corino making it seem like they wanted him to join them. When Steve grabbed the mic. and said he would not join the Decade, Whitmer said, we weren't talking about you. They then point to Corino's son, Colby Corino. Colby gets in the ring and joins the Decade. Jimmy Jacobs ran out and tried to neutralize the situation and ends up sending The Decade out of the ring. He proceeds to comfort Steve Corino, signaling the end of Jacobs' alliance in the Decade.

Jacobs announced on Twitter that he will be on the creative team for WWE. This was Jacobs' last match in ROH before departing for WWE.

== Results ==
No.	Results	Stipulations	Times
1	Mark Briscoe defeated A. C. H.	Singles match	10:17
2	Michael Elgin defeated Frankie Kazarian	Singles match	13:28
3	Matt Sydal defeated Moose (with Veda Scott and Stokley Hathaway), Tommaso Ciampa, Caprice Coleman, Cedric Alexander, and Andrew Everett	Six-man mayhem match	10:53
4	B. J. Whitmer (with Colby Corino) defeated Jimmy Jacobs	Singles match	16:04
5	Roderick Strong defeated Christopher Daniels	Singles match	9:27
6	reDRagon (Bobby Fish and Kyle O'Reilly) (c) (with Tom Lawlor) defeated The Kingdom (Michael Bennett and Matt Taven) (with Maria Kanellis)	Tag team match for the ROH World Tag Team Championship	16:32
7	Jay Lethal (c) (with Truth Martini) defeated Jushin Thunder Liger	Singles match for the ROH World Television Championship	13:05
8	Jay Briscoe (c) defeated Samoa Joe	Singles match for the ROH World Championship	22:48
(c) / – the champion(s) heading into the match
