= Supercard of Honor X =

Professional wrestling event

- Official promotional poster featuring various Ring of Honor wrestlers
- Promotion: Ring of Honor
- Date: April 1 – 2, 2016
- City: Dallas, Texas, United States
- Venue: Hyatt Regency Dallas (Landmark Ballroom)
- Attendance: Night One: ~1,400; Night Two: ~1,400

Event chronology
← Previous; 14th Anniversary Show	Next → Global Wars

ROH Supercard of Honor chronology
← Previous; IX	Next → XI

Supercard of Honor X was a two-day professional wrestling live event produced by U.S. promotion Ring of Honor (ROH), which took place Friday, April 1 and Saturday, April 2, 2016, at the Hyatt Regency Dallas in Dallas, Texas. The events was the 10th Supercard of Honor.

== Background ==
Other on-screen personnel
Role	Name
Commentators	Kevin Kelly (Night 1 & 2)
Commentators	Mr. Wrestling 3 (Night 1 & 2)
Commentators	BJ Whitmer (Night 1)
Commentators	Taeler Hendrix (Night 1)
Commentators	Will Ferrara (Night 1)
Commentators	Joey Daddiego (Night 2)
Commentators	Adam Page (Night 2)

=== Storylines ===
This professional wrestling event featured professional wrestling matches, which involve different wrestlers from pre-existing scripted feuds, plots, and storylines that played out on ROH's television programs. Wrestlers portrayed villains or heroes as they followed a series of events that built tension and culminated in a wrestling match or series of matches.

== Results ==
=== Night 1 ===
No.	Results	Stipulations	Times
1^{D}	The Pretty Boy Killers (Keith Lee and Shane Taylor) defeated The Get Along Gang (Mike Posey and Raphael King) (with ??? (Mystery manager))	Tag team match	—
2	Bobby Fish defeated Christopher Daniels by submission	Singles match	14:43
3	Roderick Strong defeated Moose (with Stokely Hathaway)	Singles match	14:25
4	Dalton Castle defeated Cheeseburger, Joey Daddiego (with Taeler Hendrix), Adam Page, Frankie Kazarian and Donovan Dijak (with Prince Nana)	Six-man Mayhem match	09:42
5	Kyle O'Reilly defeated Matt Sydal	Singles match	16:35
6	Mandy Leon and Solo Darling defeated Amber O'Neal and Deonna Purrazzo	Women of Honor Tag team match	08:26
7	Adam Cole defeated A. C. H.	Singles match	14:27
8	The Briscoes (Jay Briscoe and Mark Briscoe) and War Machine (Hanson and Raymond Rowe) defeated The All Night Express (Rhett Titus and Kenny King), Silas Young and Beer City Bruiser	Eight-man tag team match	08:32
9	Jay Lethal (c) (with Taeler Hendrix) defeated Lio Rush	Singles match for the ROH World Championship	19:37
10	The Young Bucks (Matt Jackson and Nick Jackson) defeated The Motor City Machine Guns (Alex Shelley and Chris Sabin)	Tag team match	18:25
(c) / – the champion(s) heading into the match; D / – this was a dark match

=== Night 2 ===
No.	Results	Stipulations	Times
1^{D}	The Pretty Boy Killers (Keith Lee & Shane Taylor) defeated Ken Phoenix and Shaheem Ali	Tag team match	—
2	Jay Lethal (c) (with Taeler Hendrix) defeated Cheeseburger	Singles match for the ROH World Championship	04:37
3	Colt Cabana defeated Jay Lethal (with Taeler Hendrix)	Singles match	02:55
4	Matt Sydal and A. C. H. defeated The All Night Express (Rhett Titus and Kenny King)	Tag team match	08:35
5	Donovan Dijak (with Prince Nana) defeated Will Ferrara	Singles match	07:38
6	Bobby Fish defeated Roderick Strong 2-1	Two out of three falls match for the #1 contendership to the ROH World Television Championship	16:20
7	War Machine (Hanson and Raymond Rowe) (c) defeated Silas Young and Beer City Bruiser	Tag team match for the ROH World Tag Team Championship	10:52
8	Dalton Castle defeated B. J. Whitmer	Singles match	14:55
9	The Briscoes (Jay Briscoe and Mark Briscoe) defeated The Addiction (Christopher Daniels and Frankie Kazarian), The Motor City Machine Guns (Alex Shelley and Chris Sabin) and The Young Bucks (Matt Jackson and Nick Jackson)	Four Corner Survival tag team match for the #1 contendership to the ROH World Tag Team Championship	17:02
10	Kyle O'Reilly defeated Adam Cole	No Holds Barred match	27:23
(c) / – the champion(s) heading into the match; D / – this was a dark match
