= ROH 12th Anniversary Show =

2014 Ring of Honor pay-per-view event

12th Anniversary Show
- Promotion: Ring of Honor
- Date: February 21, 2014
- City: Philadelphia, Pennsylvania
- Venue: Pennsylvania National Guard Armory
- Attendance: 775

Event chronology
| ← Previous; Final Battle | Next → Supercard of Honor VIII |

ROH Anniversary Show chronology
| ← Previous; 11th Anniversary | Next → 13th Anniversary |

12th Anniversary Show was the 12th ROH Anniversary Show professional wrestling event produced by Ring of Honor (ROH), which took place on February 21, 2014, at the Pennsylvania National Guard Armory in Philadelphia, Pennsylvania

== Background ==
12th Anniversary Show featured nine professional wrestling matches, which involved different wrestlers from pre-existing scripted feuds, plots, and storylines that played out on ROH's television programs. Wrestlers portrayed villains or heroes as they followed a series of events that built tension and culminated in a wrestling match or series of matches.

== Results ==
| No. | Results | Stipulations | Times |
|---|---|---|---|
| 1^{D} | Caprice Coleman defeated Amasis | Singles match | 5:01 |
| 2 | Matt Taven defeated Silas Young | Singles match | 6:48 |
| 3 | The Decade (Roderick Strong, B. J. Whitmer and Jimmy Jacobs) defeated Adam Page, Cedric Alexander and Mark Briscoe | Six-man tag team match | 10:33 |
| 4 | Tommaso Ciampa (c) defeated Hanson | Singles match for the ROH World Television Championship | 6:42 |
| 5 | Michael Elgin defeated Raymond Rowe | Singles match | 12:40 |
| 6 | Jay Briscoe (c) defeated Michael Bennett (with Maria Kanellis) | Singles match for the "Real" World Championship | 10:44 |
| 7 | reDRagon (c) (Bobby Fish and Kyle O'Reilly) defeated Adrenaline Rush (A. C. H. and TaDarius Thomas) | Tag team match for the ROH World Tag Team Championship | 16:42 |
| 8 | A.J. Styles defeated Jay Lethal | Singles match | 18:14 |
| 9 | Adam Cole (c) defeated Chris Hero | Singles match for the ROH World Championship | 18:20 |
| 10 | Kevin Steen defeated Cliff Compton | Unsanctioned Philadelphia Street Fight | 20:28 |
(c) / – the champion(s) heading into the match; D / – this was a dark match
