= Supercard of Honor VII =

Professional wrestling pay-per-view event

- Promotion: Ring of Honor
- Date: April 5, 2013
- City: New York, New York
- Venue: Hammerstein Ballroom
- Attendance: 1,800

Pay-per-view chronology
← Previous; 11th Anniversary Show	Next → Border Wars

ROH Supercard of Honor chronology
← Previous; VI	Next → VIII

WrestleMania Weekend chronology
← Previous; Showdown in the Sun: Day 2	Next → VIII

Supercard of Honor VII was a professional wrestling internet pay-per-view (iPPV) event produced by Ring of Honor (ROH). It was the 7th Supercard of Honor and took place on April 5, 2013 at the Hammerstein Ballroom in New York, New York.

== Production ==
Other on-screen personnel
Role	Name
Commentators	Kevin Kelly
Commentators	Caleb Seltzer
Commentators	Nigel McGuinness

=== Storylines ===
Supercard of Honor VII featured professional wrestling matches, which involved different wrestlers from pre-existing scripted feuds, plots, and storylines that played out on ROH's television programs. Wrestlers portrayed villains or heroes as they followed a series of events that built tension and culminated in a wrestling match or series of matches.

== Results ==
No.	Results	Stipulations	Times
1^{D}	Kongo defeated Corey Hollis	Singles match	—
2	A. C. H. and TaDarius Thomas defeated Q. T. Marshall and R. D. Evans	Tag team match	9:52
3	Mike Bennett (with Maria Kanellis and Bob Evans) defeated Shelton Benjamin	Singles match	7:42
4	Michael Elgin defeated Jay Lethal	Singles match to determine the #1 contender for the ROH World Championship	18:50
5	S.C.U.M. (Cliff Compton, Jimmy Jacobs, Jimmy Rave, Rhett Titus, and Rhino) (with Steve Corino) defeated Team ROH (B. J. Whitmer, Caprice Coleman, Cedric Alexander, Mark Briscoe, and Mike Mondo)	Ten-man war	11:37
6	Karl Anderson defeated Roderick Strong	Singles match	12:33
7	Matt Taven (c) (with Truth Martini and Scarlett Bordeaux) defeated Adam Cole and Matt Hardy (with Steve Corino)	Three-way elimination match for the ROH World Television Championship	11:20
8	reDRagon (Bobby Fish and Kyle O'Reilly) (c) defeated The American Wolves (Davey Richards and Eddie Edwards)	Tag team match for the ROH World Tag Team Championship	21:08
9	Jay Briscoe defeated Kevin Steen (c)	Singles match for the ROH World Championship	18:27
(c) / – the champion(s) heading into the match; D / – this was a dark match
