= Supercard of Honor XI =

Professional wrestling event

- Promotional poster featuring numerous ROH wrestlers
- Promotion: Ring of Honor
- Date: April 1, 2017
- City: Lakeland, Florida, U.S.
- Venue: Lakeland Center (Jenkins Arena)
- Attendance: 3,500

Pay-per-view chronology
← Previous; 15th Anniversary Show	Next → War of the Worlds

ROH Supercard of Honor chronology
← Previous; X	Next → XII

Supercard of Honor XI was the 11th Supercard of Honor professional wrestling pay-per-view event produced by American promotion Ring of Honor (ROH). It took place Saturday, April 1, 2017, at the Lakeland Center (Jenkins Arena) in Lakeland, Florida. With an attendance of 3,500, the event set a new ROH attendance record.

== Production ==
=== Storylines ===
Other on-screen personnel
Role	Name
Commentators	Ian Riccaboni
Commentators	QT Marshall
Commentators	Colt Cabana
Commentators	Kevin Kelly

This professional wrestling event featured thirteen different professional wrestling matches, which involve different wrestlers from pre-existing scripted feuds, plots, and storylines that played out on ROH's television programs. Wrestlers portrayed villains or heroes as they followed a series of events that built tension and culminated in a wrestling match or series of matches.

Through partnerships with New Japan Pro-Wrestling (NJPW) and Mexico's Consejo Mundial de Lucha Libre (CMLL), wrestlers from those two promotions also appeared on the card. NJPW wrestlers Jushin Thunder Liger and Yoshi-Hashi were originally scheduled to take part in the event, but were forced to pull out due to visa issues. They were replaced by Guerrillas of Destiny (Tama Tonga and Tanga Loa).

== Results ==
No.	Results	Stipulations	Times
1^{D}	Tasha Steelz defeated Brandi Lauren	Women of Honor Singles match	4:04
2^{D}	Jenny Rose and Mandy Leon defeated Faye Jackson and Sumie Sakai	Women of Honor Tag team match	8:36
3^{D}	Marcela defeated La Amapola	Women of Honor Singles match	11:31
4	Marty Scurll (c) defeated Adam Cole	Singles match for the ROH World Television Championship	13:01
5	Silas Young and Beer City Bruiser defeated The Kingdom (Matt Taven and Vinny Marseglia) (with T. K. O'Ryan)	Tag team match	06:57
6	The Briscoes (Jay Briscoe and Mark Briscoe) and Bully Ray (c) defeated Bullet Club (Hangman Page, Tama Tonga and Tanga Roa)	Six-man tag team match for the ROH World Six-Man Tag Team Championship	13:31
7	Jay Lethal defeated Cody	Texas Bullrope match	17:26
8	The Motor City Machine Guns (Alex Shelley and Chris Sabin) defeated Cheeseburger and Will Ferrara and The Rebellion (Rhett Titus and Shane Taylor)	Three-way tag team match	09:24
9	Punishment Martinez defeated Frankie Kazarian	Singles match	06:03
10	Bobby Fish defeated Silas Young by disqualification	Singles match	02:25
11	Volador Jr. and Will Ospreay defeated Dragon Lee and Jay White	Tag team match	13:57
12	Christopher Daniels (c) defeated Dalton Castle	Singles match for the ROH World Championship	15:43
13	The Young Bucks (Matt Jackson and Nick Jackson) defeated The Hardys (Jeff Hardy and Matt Hardy) (c)	Ladder War VII for the ROH World Tag Team Championship	25:25
(c) / – the champion(s) heading into the match; D / – this was a dark match
