= Supercard of Honor VI =

- Promotion: Ring of Honor
- Date: May 21, 2011
- City: Chicago Ridge, Illinois, United States
- Venue: Frontier Fieldhouse
- Attendance: 700

ROH event chronology
| ← Previous; Honor Takes Center Stage | Next → Best in the World |

Supercard of Honor chronology
| ← Previous; V | Next → VII |

Supercard of Honor VI was a professional wrestling event produced by Ring of Honor (ROH). It was the 6th Supercard of Honor and took place on May 21, 2011 at Frontier Fieldhouse in Chicago Ridge, Illinois.

== Production ==
Other on-screen personnel
| Role | Name |
|---|---|
| Commentators | Kevin Kelly |
| Commentators | Eric Santamaria |

=== Storylines ===
Supercard of Honor VI featured professional wrestling matches, which involved different wrestlers from pre-existing scripted feuds, plots, and storylines that played out on ROH's television programs. Wrestlers portrayed villains or heroes as they followed a series of events that built tension and culminated in a wrestling match or series of matches.

== Results ==
| No. | Results | Stipulations | Times |
|---|---|---|---|
| 1 | Homicide defeated Michael Elgin | Singles match | 9:27 |
| 2 | Future Shock (Adam Cole and Kyle O'Reilly) defeated Bravado Brothers (Harlem Bravado and Lance Bravado) | Tag team match | 9:45 |
| 3 | Michael Bennett (with Bob Evans) defeated Steve Corino (with Jimmy Jacobs) | Singles match | 10:02 |
| 4 | El Generico defeated Chris Hero | Singles match | 10:53 |
| 5 | Davey Richards defeated Charlie Haas | Singles match | 18:50 |
| 6 | Shelton Benjamin defeated Claudio Castagnoli | Singles match | 17:21 |
| 7 | Colt Cabana defeated Christopher Daniels | Singles match | 8:52 |
| 8 | Briscoe Brothers (Jay Briscoe and Mark Briscoe) defeated The All Night Express (Kenny King and Rhett Titus) | Chicago Street Fight Tag team match | 19:29 |
| 9 | Eddie Edwards (c) defeated Roderick Strong | Singles match for the ROH World Championship | 23:39 |
(c) / – the champion(s) heading into the match

== See also ==
- 2011 in professional wrestling
