= G1 Supercard =

2019 Ring of Honor and New Japan Pro-Wrestling event

- Promotional poster featuring Madison Square Garden
- Promotion(s): Ring of Honor; New Japan Pro-Wrestling
- Date: April 6, 2019
- City: New York City, New York
- Venue: Madison Square Garden
- Attendance: 16,534

Pay-per-view chronology
← Previous (ROH) 17th Anniversary Show (NJPW) New Japan Cup 2019; Honor Rising: Japan 2019	Next → (ROH) Best in the World (2019) (NJPW) Wrestling Hinokuni

Supercard of Honor chronology
← Previous; XII	Next → XIV (cancelled)

G1 Supercard was a professional wrestling supershow co-produced by the American Ring of Honor (ROH) and Japanese New Japan Pro-Wrestling (NJPW) promotions. It was the 13th annual Supercard of Honor event and took place on April 6, 2019, at Madison Square Garden in New York City, New York. The event was streamed live on Honor Club, New Japan Pro-Wrestling World, FITE TV, and broadcast live on traditional pay-per-view outlets. It is the final Supercard of Honor to be produced under Sinclair ownership.

The card featured 12 matches. Both the IWGP Heavyweight Championship and ROH World Championship were defended on the card, as IWGP Champion Jay White defended against New Japan Cup winner Kazuchika Okada, while Survival of the Fittest winner Marty Scurll and Matt Taven wrestled for the ROH World Title against champion Jay Lethal in a ladder match. The event's undercard saw two Winner Take All matches between NJPW and ROH champions, and UK partner promotion Revolution Pro Wrestling (RPW) had its top title – the British Heavyweight Championship – defended as well.

== Production ==
Other on-screen personnel
Role:	Name:
English commentators	Ian Riccaboni (ROH)
English commentators	Colt Cabana (ROH)
English commentators	Kevin Kelly (NJPW)
English commentators	Chris Charlton (NJPW)
English commentators	Toru Yano (Honor Rumble)
English commentators	Mandy Leon (match #5)
English commentators	Caprice Coleman (matches #6, #7, & #8)
English commentators	Nick Aldis (match #11)
Japanese commentators	Milano Collection AT
Japanese commentators	Katsuhiko Kanazawa
Japanese commentators	Soichi Shibata
Japanese commentators	Kazuaki Kusanagi
Japanese commentators	Kazuo Yamazaki
Japanese commentators	Shinpei Nogami
Ring announcers	Bobby Cruise (ROH)
Ring announcers	Makoto Abe (NJPW)
Referees	Todd Sinclair (ROH)
Referees	Paul Turner (ROH)
Referees	Kenta Sato (NJPW)
Referees	Marty Asami (NJPW)
Referees	Red Shoes Unno (NJPW)
Referees	Tiger Hattori (NJPW)
Referees	Chris Roberts (RPW)

=== Background ===
In June 2018, it was officially announced that Ring of Honor and New Japan Pro-Wrestling would be running a show at Madison Square Garden. One month later, it was reported that the event would have been canceled due to interference by WWE. The issues were eventually resolved and tickets went on sale for the event in August. During the pre-sale, 60% of tickets were sold, with the remaining of the 15,000 tickets selling within 16 minutes of going on sale. The G1 Supercard was the first professional wrestling event at Madison Square Garden by a promotion not owned by the McMahon family since November 14, 1960.

=== Storylines ===
G1 Supercard featured professional wrestling matches that involve different wrestlers from pre-existing feuds and storylines. Wrestlers portrayed villains, heroes, or less distinguishable characters in the scripted events that built tension and culminated in a wrestling match or series of matches.

At The New Beginning in Osaka, Jay White defeated Hiroshi Tanahashi to win the IWGP Heavyweight Championship for the first time. It was announced the following day that White will make his first title defense at G1 Supercard against the winner of the New Japan Cup. On March 24, Kazuchika Okada would defeat Sanada in the finals of the New Japan Cup to earn the opportunity to face White for the IWGP Heavyweight Championship at the G1 Supercard, a rematch of Wrestle Kingdom 13, where White defeated Okada.

On the second night of the Honor Rising: Japan 2019 supershow, the Guerrillas of Destiny (Tama Tonga and Tanga Loa) won the IWGP Tag Team Championship for the fifth time, while in the main event ten-time title holders The Briscoe Brothers (Jay Briscoe and Mark Briscoe) successfully defended the ROH World Tag Team Championship. Following the main event match, Jay and Mark Briscoe challenged Tama Tonga and Tanga Loa to a winner takes all match for both of the teams' respective titles at G1 Supercard. The Guerrillas of Destiny then came out, confronting the Briscoes and accepting the challenge. On the following day, NJPW officially announced a match between the IWGP and ROH champions, noting that Jay and Mark Briscoe still had a defense scheduled before the show against Villain Enterprises (PCO and Brody King). King and PCO won the match, the titles, and the G1 Supercard match vs. the Guerrillas of Destiny. The Briscoes and Los Ingobernables de Japón (Sanada and Evil) would later be added to the match to make it a Winner Take All four-way tag team match for the IWGP and ROH Tag Team Titles.

On the NJPW's 47th Anniversary Event, Taiji Ishimori successfully defended the IWGP Junior Heavyweight Championship against Jyushin Thunder Liger. After the match, he issued an open challenge to an ROH wrestler for a match at G1 Supercard. The challenge was accepted by Dragon Lee, representing Mexico's Consejo Mundial de Lucha Libre (CMLL) promotion – a longtime partner of both NJPW and ROH. On the following day, Bandido expressed the intention of joining the title match representing ROH. Later that day, a three-way match for the title was officially announced.

On March 9, it was announced that both ROH and NJPW wrestlers would compete in an Honor Rumble match as part of the G1 Supercard pre-show.

At the G1 Supercard press conference on March 13, it was announced that Marty Scurll – who won the Survival of the Fittest tournament to earn an ROH World Championship match – will invoke his title opportunity at G1 Supercard, where he will face champion Jay Lethal for the title. Two nights later at the ROH 17th Anniversary Show, Lethal and Matt Taven wrestled to a 60-minute time limit draw in a championship match, so Taven was added to the G1 Supercard match, which then became a ladder match.

At Wrestle Kingdom 13, Zack Sabre Jr. defeated Tomohiro Ishii to win the RPW British Heavyweight Championship. In a third round New Japan Cup match, Hiroshi Tanahashi beat Sabre Jr. to advance in the tournament. It was later announced that Zack would defend his British Heavyweight Title against Tanahashi.

In a first round New Japan Cup match, Kota Ibushi defeated the IWGP Intercontinental Champion Tetsuya Naito. Ibushi would then be eliminated from the tournament in his second round matchup against Zack Sabre Jr. Throughout the rest of the tournament Ibushi would face Naito in tag matches with Naito pulling for another match against Ibushi. It was announced that Naito would defend his Intercontinental Title against Ibushi.

== Reception ==
Critics of G1 Supercard mostly praised New Japan Pro-Wrestling's matches and angles while mostly criticizing Ring of Honor's matches and angles. Larry Csonka of 411Mania described G1 Supercard as "...a tale of two shows, with NJPW delivering bangers and a NJPW experience, while ROH failed and opted to trot out The Beautiful People, gave a cold Kenny King another title chance, went too long with Bully Ray, Klein’s title win, and wasted a huge opportunity on the biggest platform possible."

Sean Radican of PWTorch called G1 Supercard a "really good show" saying that, "the ROH portions of the show weren’t very good at all outside of the Ladder match and even that had issues as the crowd didn’t invest much in the match and were really flat for Taven winning. The NJPW matches really delivered big time."

== Results ==
No.	Results	Stipulations	Times
1^{D}	Jenny Rose and Oedo Tai (Kagetsu and Hazuki) defeated Hana Kimura, Stella Grey, and Sumie Sakai	Six-woman tag team match	6:46
2^{P}	Kenny King won by last eliminating Jushin Thunder Liger	30-man Honor Rumble for a future ROH World Championship match	42:21
3	Jeff Cobb (ROH) defeated Will Ospreay (NEVER)	Winner takes all match for the NEVER Openweight Championship and ROH World Television Championship	12:52
4	Rush defeated Dalton Castle	Singles match	0:15
5	Kelly Klein defeated Mayu Iwatani (c)	Singles match for the Women of Honor World Championship	10:38
6	Flip Gordon and Lifeblood (Juice Robinson and Mark Haskins) defeated Bully Ray, Shane Taylor, and Silas Young	Six-man tag team New York City Street Fight	15:01
7	Dragon Lee defeated Taiji Ishimori (c) and Bandido	Three-way match for the IWGP Junior Heavyweight Championship	8:54
8	Guerrillas of Destiny (Tama Tonga and Tanga Loa) (IWGP) (with Jado) defeated Villain Enterprises (PCO and Brody King) (ROH), Los Ingobernables de Japón (Evil and Sanada), and The Briscoe Brothers (Jay Briscoe and Mark Briscoe)	Winner takes all four-way tag team match for the IWGP Tag Team Championship and ROH World Tag Team Championship	9:45
9	Zack Sabre Jr. (c) (with Taka Michinoku) defeated Hiroshi Tanahashi by submission	Singles match for the British Heavyweight Championship	15:14
10	Kota Ibushi defeated Tetsuya Naito (c)	Singles match for the IWGP Intercontinental Championship	20:53
11	Matt Taven defeated Jay Lethal (c) and Marty Scurll	Three-way ladder match for the ROH World Championship	29:35
12	Kazuchika Okada defeated Jay White (c) (with Gedo)	Singles match for the IWGP Heavyweight Championship	32:33
(c) / – the champion(s) heading into the match; D / – this was a dark match; P / – the match was broadcast on the pre-show

=== Honor Rumble entrants ===
Promotion

– ROH
– NJPW
– Free agent
– Winner

Draw	Entrant	Promotion/Status	Order	Eliminated by	Elimination(s)
1	Kenny King	ROH	--	Winner	3
2	Minoru Suzuki	NJPW	23	Tomohiro Ishii	7
3	Cheeseburger	ROH	24	T. K. O'Ryan & Vinny Marseglia	1
4	Beer City Bruiser	ROH	1	Sho & Yoh	0
5	Sho	NJPW	6	Bad Luck Fale	1
6	Shingo Takagi	NJPW	8	Minoru Suzuki	1
7	Bushi	NJPW	2	Rocky Romero	0
8	Yoh	NJPW	5	Bad Luck Fale	1
9	Shaheem Ali	ROH	4	Brian Milonas	0
10	Rhett Titus	ROH	7	Shingo Takagi	0
11	LSG	ROH	3	Brian Milonas	0
12	Ryusuke Taguchi	NJPW	9	Jonathan Gresham	0
13	Will Ferrara	ROH	10	Minoru Suzuki	0
14	Chase Owens	NJPW	11	Minoru Suzuki	0
15	Rocky Romero	NJPW	15	Tomohiro Ishii	1
16	Brian Milonas	ROH	12	Jushin Thunder Liger	2
17	Bad Luck Fale	NJPW	17	Cheeseburger, Colt Cabana, Delirious, Hirooki Goto, Jushin Thunder Liger, Kenny King, Minoru Suzuki, T. K. O'Ryan & Vinny Marseglia	3
18	Jonathan Gresham	ROH	21	The Great Muta	1
19	Tracy Williams	ROH	13	T. K. O'Ryan & Vinny Marseglia	0
20	Yoshi-Hashi	NJPW	16	Bad Luck Fale	0
21	PJ Black	ROH	14	Tomohiro Ishii	0
22	Jushin Thunder Liger	NJPW	30	Kenny King	3
23	T. K. O'Ryan	ROH	28	The Great Muta	5
24	Vinny Marseglia	ROH	27	Jushin Thunder Liger	5
25	Delirious	ROH	18	The Great Muta	1
26	Tomohiro Ishii	NJPW	26	T. K. O'Ryan & Vinny Marseglia	3
27_{A}	Toru Yano (Note: Toru Yano came out as the #27 entrant, but ultimately gave his spot to Colt Cabana. However, Yano also entered the match a few minutes later.)	NJPW	20	Minoru Suzuki	0
27_{B}	Colt Cabana	ROH	19	Minoru Suzuki	1
28	Hirooki Goto	NJPW	22	Minoru Suzuki	1
29	King Haku	NJPW	25	T. K. O'Ryan & Vinny Marseglia	0
30	The Great Muta	Free agent	29	Kenny King	3

== See also ==
- 2019 in professional wrestling
- List of Ring of Honor pay-per-view events
- List of NJPW pay-per-view events
- All In (2018)
