= Cedric Alexander =

American professional wrestler (born 1989)

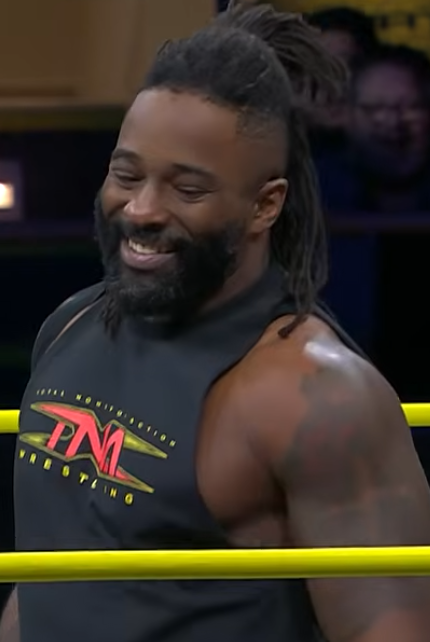
- Alexander in 2026

Personal information
- Born: Cedric Alexander Johnson; August 16, 1989 (age 37) Charlotte, North Carolina, U.S.
- Spouse: Aerial Hull (m. 2018)
- Children: 1

Professional wrestling career
- Ring name(s): Cedric Alexander; Gary Garbutt
- Billed height: 5 ft 10 in (178 cm)
- Billed weight: 205 lb (93 kg)
- Billed from: Charlotte, North Carolina
- Trained by: George South Pro Wrestling School
- Debut: July 17, 2009

Cedric Alexander Johnson (born August 16, 1989) is an American professional wrestler. He is signed to Total Nonstop Action Wrestling (TNA), where he is a member of The System. He also makes sporadic appearances on the independent circuit. He is also known for his tenures with ROH and WWE.

Alexander worked for ROH from 2010 until 2016. He started as part of C&C Factory, a tag team with Caprice Coleman. They worked together until 2014, then he worked as a singles wrestler. He left ROH in 2016, when he was invited to WWE's Cruiserweight Classic tournament. After that, Alexander would sign a contract with WWE after an impressive performance at the tournament despite losing, which gained critical and fan praise, and would begin performing in their new cruiserweight division. At WrestleMania 34, Alexander won a tournament to win the WWE Cruiserweight Championship. He would then be drafted to the Raw brand, later becoming part of The Hurt Business in 2020, and went on to win the WWE Raw Tag Team Championship alongside Shelton Benjamin. Alexander was released by WWE in February 2025. He then signed with TNA that June and later won the TNA X Division Championship in May 2026.

== Professional wrestling career ==
=== Ring of Honor (2010–2016) ===
==== C&C Wrestle Factory (2010–2013) ====
Over the course of 2010, Alexander mostly wrestled dark matches for Ring of Honor (ROH). In 2011 he started performing for ROH on a regular basis after he formed the tag team called the C&C Wrestle Factory with Caprice Coleman.

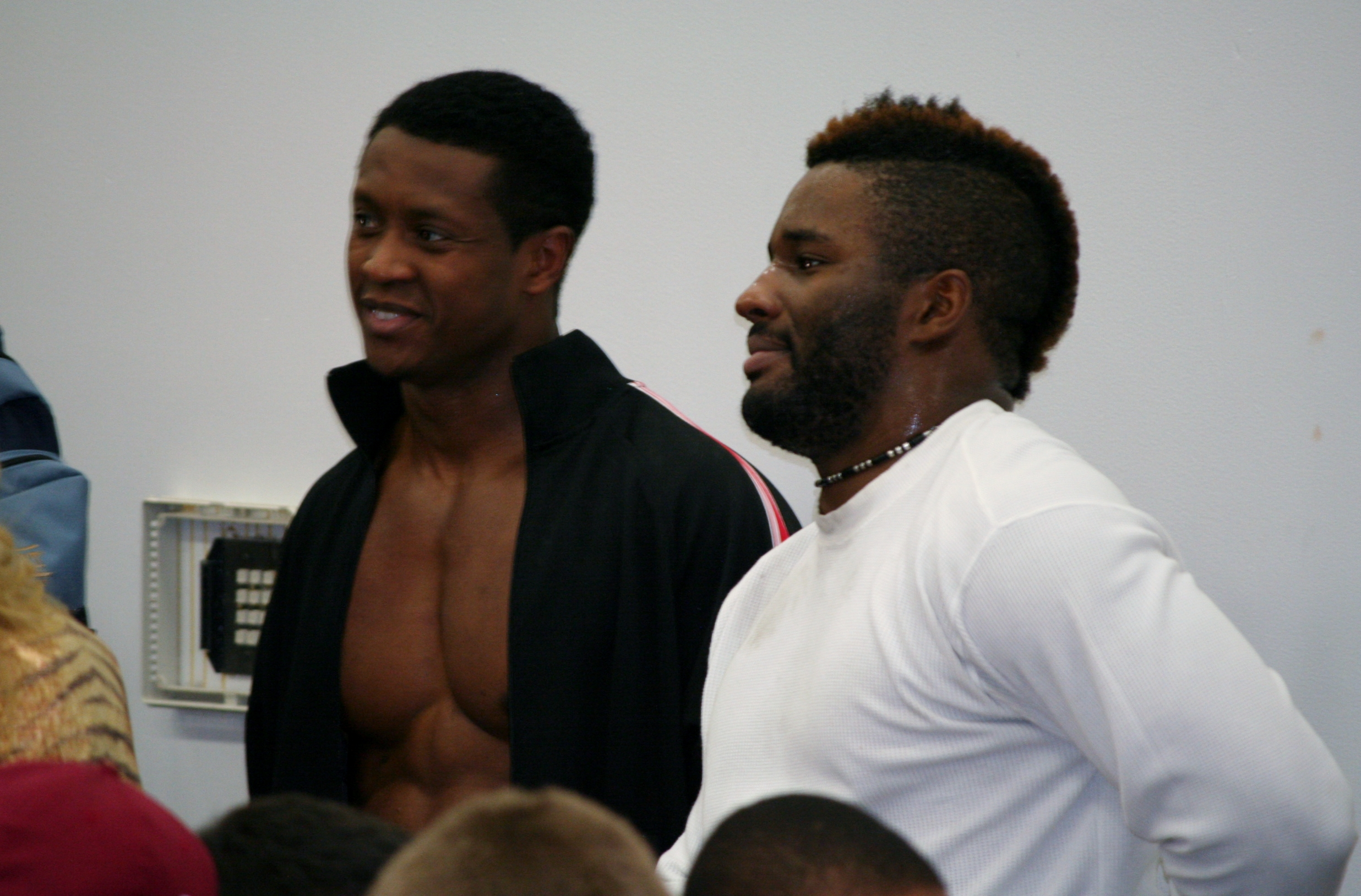
Alexander (right) with Caprice Coleman as the C&C Wrestle Factory in 2011

On December 23 at Final Battle 2011, C&C Wrestle Factory competed in a Tag team gauntlet match for a future ROH World Tag Team Championship title shot where they eliminated the Bravado Brothers (Harlem and Lancelot). On March 30 at Showdown in the Sun Chapter 1, they were defeated by Wrestling's Greatest Tag Team (Charlie Haas and Shelton Benjamin). The next day at Showdown in the Sun Chapter 2, Alexander was defeated by Tommaso Ciampa. On September 15 at Death Before Dishonor X: State of Emergency, they were defeated by S.C.U.M. (Jimmy Jacobs and Steve Corino). At Glory By Honor XI: The Unbreakable Hope on October 13, they once again defeated the Bravado Brothers. On December 16 at Final Battle 2012: Doomsday, they unsuccessfully challenged S.C.U.M. for the ROH World Tag Team Championship in a three-way match that also included the Briscoe Brothers (Jay and Mark Briscoe) who won the match. On March 3 at the 11th Anniversary Show, he and Coleman were defeated by S.C.U.M. On April 5 at Supercard of Honor VII, C&C Wrestle Factory teamed with B. J. Whitmer, Mark Briscoe and Mike Mondo in a losing effort against S.C.U.M. (Cliff Compton, Jimmy Jacobs, Jimmy Rave, Rhett Titus and Rhino). On May 4 at Border Wars 2013, they defeated A. C. H. and TaDarius Thomas. On May 18 at Relentless, they teamed with Jay Lethal to defeat Matt Taven and reDRagon (Bobby Fish and Kyle O'Reilly). On July 8 at Live And Let Die, Alexander was defeated by Davey Richards. On June 22 at Best in the World 2013, they unsuccessfully challenged reDRagon for the ROH World Tag Team Championship in a three-way match that also included S.C.U.M. (Rhett Titus and Cliff Compton). On August 3 at All Star Extravaganza V, they were defeated by Adrenaline Rush (ACH and TaDarius Thomas) in a three-way match that also included The Young Bucks (Matt and Nick Jackson).

==== Singles competition (2014–2016) ====
On January 25 at Wrestling's Finest, he defeated Andrew Everett. On February 8 at State Of The Art, he was defeated by Jimmy Jacobs. On February 21 at the 12th Anniversary Show he teamed with Mark Briscoe and Adam Page in a losing effort against The Decade (Roderick Strong, B. J. Whitmer and Jimmy Jacobs). On March 7 at Raising The Bar – Day 1, he teamed with Adam Page in a tag team match against The Decade where they lost. The next day at Raising The Bar – Day 2 he was defeated by Kevin Steen. On March 22 at Flyin' High he was defeated by Michael Elgin. On April 4 at Supercard of Honor VIII, he lost a match against Roderick Strong. On April 19 at Second To None, he teamed with Andrew Everett in a losing effort against reDRagon. At Global Wars on May 10, he defeated Roderick Strong. After the match he was attacked by Roderick Strong and the rest of The Decade and was put through chairs and his shoulder was separated. Alexander made an appearance at War of the Worlds attacking The Decade from behind. This led to a submission match against Roderick Strong at Best in the World, in which he came out victorious. On August 9, during the Summer Heat Tour, he unsuccessfully challenged Michael Elgin for the ROH World Championship. On September 6 at All Star Extravaganza VI he was scheduled to face Silas Young, but when Young broke his leg and ACH did not show up for the event he challenged Jay Lethal for the ROH World Television Championship where he was defeated. On October 11 at Champions vs. All Stars, he was defeated by Christopher Daniels. On November 7 at Survival Of The Fittest- Day 1, he was defeated by Adam Page in a 2014 Survival of the Fittest qualifying match. The next day at Survival Of The Fittest- Day 2, he was defeated by Jay Lethal. On November 22 at Tag Wars, he was defeated by Tommaso Ciampa in No Disqualification Grudge Match. On December 7 at Final Battle 2014, he teamed with The Addiction (Christopher Daniels and Frankie Kazarian), but ultimately lost to The Young Bucks and ACH following a Meltzer Driver and an ACH 450 splash.

On May 16, 2015, at Global Wars '15, Alexander ended Moose's undefeated streak after hitting him with a wrench, turning heel. On June 19 at Best in the World 2015, Alexander reunited with Caprice Coleman, but ultimately broke off the partnership for good, when Coleman refused to allow Alexander to use the wrench again in a match against War Machine (Hanson and Raymond Rowe). Later that same event, he attacked Moose and aligned himself with Moose's former manager Veda Scott, confirming his heel turn.

On May 14, 2016, Alexander announced his departure from ROH after six years with the company.

=== WWE (2016–2025) ===
==== Cruiserweight division (2016–2018) ====
On June 13, 2016, Alexander was announced as a participant in WWE's Cruiserweight Classic tournament. The tournament began on June 23 with Alexander defeating Clement Petiot in his first round match. On July 14, Alexander was eliminated from the tournament by Kota Ibushi in a highly acclaimed match, leading to the fans in attendance chanting "please sign Cedric" following the match, and earned a 4 1/2-star rating from Dave Meltzer of the Wrestling Observer Newsletter.

On the August 29 episode of Raw, Alexander was announced as part of the upcoming cruiserweight division. Alexander made his debut on the September 19 episode of Raw as a face, submitting to The Brian Kendrick in a fatal four-way match that included Gran Metalik and Rich Swann to determine the number one contender for the WWE Cruiserweight Championship. On the September 26 episode of Raw, Alexander would get his first win, teaming with Rich Swann to defeat Lince Dorado and Drew Gulak. On the December 6 episode of 205 Live, Alexander started an on-screen relationship with Alicia Fox. Later that night, he was defeated by Noam Dar, and after the match, Dar dedicated his victory to Fox, igniting a feud between the two. On the December 19 episode of Raw, Alexander defeated Dar, but Dar attempted to seduce Fox again afterwards. On the January 10, 2017 episode of 205 Live, Alexander decided to break-up with Fox, after she cost him a match. In March, it was announced that Alexander would be out of action for 3–5 months with a knee injury. He returned from injury on the May 23 episode of 205 Live, defeating Johnny Boone. On the July 11 episode of 205 Live, Alexander defeated Dar in an "I quit" match to end their feud.

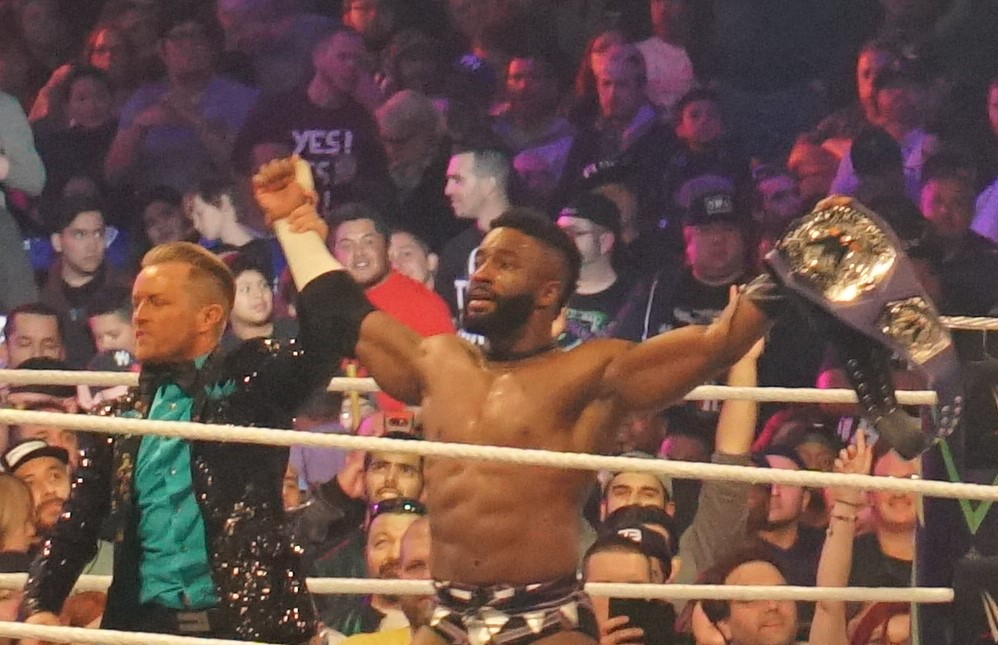
Alexander after winning the WWE Cruiserweight Championship at WrestleMania 34

On the December 11 episode of Raw, Alexander won a fatal four-way match to face Drew Gulak the following week, with the winner earning a match against Enzo Amore for the Cruiserweight Championship. Alexander defeated Gulak the following week on Raw to become the number one contender to the championship. On the January 8, 2018 episode of Raw, he faced Amore for the title, which Amore lost by countout, therefore retaining. Alexander was scheduled to face Amore for the Cruiserweight Championship at the Royal Rumble pay-per-view, but the match was cancelled and the title was vacated when Amore was released from WWE.

In the following weeks, a tournament to determine a new champion was arranged, in which Alexander defeated Gran Metalik in the first round, TJP in the quarterfinals, and Roderick Strong in the semi-finals to advance to the final. At WrestleMania 34 on April 8, Alexander defeated Mustafa Ali to win the Cruiserweight Championship. During the weeks building up to the match, Alexander and Ali referred to themselves as the "Soul" and the "Heart" of 205 Live respectively. On the following episode of 205 Live, Alexander was attacked by Buddy Murphy during his championship celebration. At the Greatest Royal Rumble event, Alexander made his first successful title defense against Kalisto. Alexander then retained his title against Murphy on the May 29 episode of 205 Live and against Hideo Itami on the July 10 episode of 205 Live. At SummerSlam, Alexander successfully retained his title against Drew Gulak. On the September 19 episode of 205 Live, Alexander defeated Gulak in a SummerSlam rematch to retain the Cruiserweight Championship. At Super Show-Down on October 6, Alexander lost the Cruiserweight Championship against Buddy Murphy, ending his reign at 181 days, and also marking his first televised loss in 2018.

On the November 28 episode of 205 Live, Alexander teamed with Mustafa Ali to defeat Murphy and Tony Nese after Alexander pinned Murphy, this would earn him a title shot against Murphy. At TLC: Tables, Ladders & Chairs, Alexander received his title rematch but failed to regain the title.

==== Raw roster debut and early feuds (2019–2020) ====
In early 2019, Alexander competed in a tournament for a match for the title at WrestleMania 35, where Alexander lasted until the finals of the tournament, where he lost to Tony Nese. On the March 26 episode of 205 Live, he lost the match to Ariya Daivari when Oney Lorcan cost his match. On the April 16 episode of 205 Live, Alexander lost his final match on 205 Live against Lorcan, and after the match, the two shook hands as a sign of respect, thus ending their brief feud.

As part of the 2019 WWE Superstar Shake-up, Alexander was drafted to the Raw brand. On the April 22 episode of Raw, Alexander would lose his debut match against Cesaro. On the June 24 episode of Raw, Alexander briefly won the 24/7 Championship from R-Truth before immediately losing it against EC3 during a flurry of title changes. On the July 8 episode of Raw, Alexander, disguised as Gary Garbutt (originally played by the former AAF's Memphis Express president Kosha Irby), teamed with Roman Reigns in a losing effort against Drew McIntyre and Shane McMahon. A week later on Raw, Alexander scored an upset victory over McIntyre, achieving his first victory on the brand.

In August, Alexander entered the King of the Ring tournament, where he defeated Sami Zayn in the first round but lost to Baron Corbin in the quarter finals after he was attacked by The O.C. (AJ Styles, Luke Gallows, and Karl Anderson) prior to the match. The following week on Raw, he would pin Styles in a 10-man tag team match, earning himself a United States Championship title shot. At Clash of Champions, he was defeated by Styles. On the September 30 episode of Raw, Alexander would once again challenge Styles for the United States Championship, but was defeated again.

==== The Hurt Business (2020–2023) ====
On the April 6, 2020 episode of Raw, Alexander formed a tag team with Ricochet as they defeated Oney Lorcan and Danny Burch. In the following weeks, Alexander and Ricochet began feuding with The Hurt Business (MVP, Bobby Lashley, and Shelton Benjamin) after they injured Apollo Crews. On the July 6 episode of Raw, after Alexander and Ricochet lost to MVP and Lashley, MVP approached Alexander and attempted to convince him to join his group with Lashley rather than being Ricochet's "sidekick". On the August 13 episode of Raw, Alexander pinned Benjamin to win the 24/7 title for a second time only to lose it back to Benjamin later on in the night.

On the September 7 episode of Raw, Alexander attacked his tag team partners Ricochet and Apollo Crews during a six-man tag team match against The Hurt Business, thus joining The Hurt Business and turning heel for the first time in WWE. Alexander began teaming with Benjamin as they feuded with The New Day (Kofi Kingston and Xavier Woods) for the WWE Raw Tag Team Championship. At TLC, Alexander and Benjamin defeated New Day to win the WWE Raw Tag Team Championship, only to lose them back to The New Day on the March 15, 2021 episode of Raw.

On the March 29 episode of Raw, Lashley lambasted Alexander and Benjamin due to them losing the Raw Tag Team Championships and losing to Drew McIntyre in a 2-on-1 handicap match, a loss that meant they'd be barred from ringside at Lashley's WWE Championship match at WrestleMania 37 against McIntyre. This led to Lashley attacking Alexander and Benjamin, thus kicking them out of the faction in the process. On the April 5 episode of Raw, Alexander lost to Lashley in singles competition. In the following weeks, Alexander and Benjamin began a losing streak against teams such as The Viking Raiders (Erik and Ivar) twice, and to RK-Bro (Riddle and Randy Orton) once. On the May 3 episode of Raw, after losing to Lucha House Party (Gran Metalik and Lince Dorado), Alexander insulted Benjamin and said that the team is done.

On the September 27 episode of Raw, Alexander and Benjamin helped Lashley fight off The New Day and in the process, reuniting The Hurt Business. On the November 22 episode of Raw, Alexander defeated Reggie to win the 24/7 title for a third time, only to lose it to Dana Brooke moments later. Months later in January 2022, after not being seen together, Benjamin and Alexander approached Lashley under the assumption they were still a unit, only to be dismissed. This would cause the pair to launch a sneak attack that evening, but they were easily dealt with.

After his tag team partner Shelton Benjamin got injured, Alexander would be involved in segments where he tried to get in on MVP and Omos' good side during their feud with Bobby Lashley, up until Hell in a Cell when Alexander distracted MVP and Omos during their 2-on-1 Handicap Match which allowed Lashley to pick up the victory. Later on, Lashley would confront Alexander backstage, questioning his motive behind the involvement, with Alexander saying that the distraction was for himself, and that he's "getting sick of being treated like an unwanted twerp", and is going to start standing on his own two feet, to which Lashley commended and both ended up shaking hands, therefore turning Alexander face for the first time since 2020. On August 8, 2022, Alexander defeated Benjamin in the Main Event tapings, effectively signaling the end of The Hurt Business.

On the January 9, 2023 episode of Raw, Alexander and Benjamin reunited to take part in a Tag Team Turmoil match. Earlier during the show, Lashley and MVP teased an alliance, with MVP crediting himself for reuniting Benjamin and Alexander, and getting Lashley reinstated on Raw after being suspended. On the February 6 edition of Raw, Alexander and Benjamin defeated Alpha Academy (Chad Gable and Otis) with MVP in their corner further hinting at a possible reunion. However, the reunion angle was quietly dropped shortly after although Alexander and Benjamin would continue teaming together until Benjamin's release on September 21, 2023, effectively disbanding the team.

==== Various alliances and departure (2023–2025) ====
Following Benjamin's release, Alexander subsequently returned to singles competition and was quietly moved to the SmackDown brand in November. On the December 8 episode of SmackDown, Alexander teamed up with Ashante "Thee" Adonis in a dark match accompanied by B-Fab, where they would score a victory over Pretty Deadly, with Adonis picking up the win. On February 9, 2024, episode of SmackDown, Alexander and Adonis appeared in a promo together, officially cementing their status as a tag team.

On the July 9 episode of NXT, Alexander and Adonis joined the NXT brand. In his NXT debut match on the July 23 episode of NXT, Alexander was defeated by Trick Williams. At NXT: The Great American Bash on July 30, Alexander defeated Brooks Jensen to pick up his first win in NXT and his first singles match win since 2021. Around September, Alexander quietly split from Adonis and formed an alliance with Je'Von Evans while acting as a mentor to Evans. On the October 29 episode of NXT, Alexander and Evans failed to defeat NXT Tag Team Champions Nathan Frazer and Axiom for the titles after Evans was lured to the back by Wes Lee, leaving Alexander to fend for himself at the closing stages of the match. On the December 31 episode of NXT, Alexander faced Ethan Page, who had (kayfabe) crushed Evans' jaw two weeks ago. After losing the match, Page crushed Alexander's hand in a toolbox. He then faced Page again on the January 28, 2025 episode of NXT in a losing effort in what would be his final match for WWE. On February 7, Alexander was released from WWE, ending his nine-year tenure with the company.

==== TNA invasion (2025) ====
While signed to TNA, Alexander returned to WWE on the September 23 episode of NXT, where he and other TNA wrestlers invaded NXT, brawling with various wrestlers on the NXT roster.

=== Independent circuit (2025–present) ===
On May 9, 2025, Alexander made his first post-WWE appearance for House of Glory (HOG) at their event Waging War, where he unsuccessfully challenged Mike Santana for the HOG Heavyweight Championship. On May 18, Alexander made his debut for Deadlock Pro-Wrestling (DPW) at Limit Break, where he defeated Andrew Everett. On June 13, Alexander made his debut for DEFY Wrestling at Vortex, where he defeated Starboy Charlie. On July 13 at DPW Tag Festival, Cedric challenged LaBron Kozone for his DPW National Title but he was unsuccessful to defeat LaBron.

=== Total Nonstop Action Wrestling (2025–present) ===
Alexander made his Total Nonstop Action Wrestling (TNA) debut on the June 20 episode of Impact!, saving Order 4 (Jason Hotch, John Skyler, and Tasha Steelz) from an attack by Mustafa Ali. On the July 10 episode of Impact!, Alexander made his TNA in-ring debut, teaming with Hotch and Skyler to defeat AJZ, Steve Gibki, and Tony Vincita. On July 20 at Slammiversary, Alexander was defeated by Ali after interference from Order 4. On August 15 at Emergence, Alexander failed to win the TNA X Division Championship from Leon Slater. On October 12 at Bound for Glory, Alexander competed in the 22-person Intergender Call Your Shot Gauntlet match, eliminating Trey Miguel before being eliminated by Eric Young. on Turning Point, Alexander and The Hardys (Jeff Hardy and Matt Hardy) lost to Order 4 (Mustafa Ali, John Skyler, and Jason Hotch). At Final Resolution, Alexander defeated Eric Young on the preshow. On the December 11 episode of Impact, Alexander defeated BDE, Dezmond Xavier, Jake Something, Jason Hotch and Ryan Nemeth in a Six-Way match to determine the number one contender for the TNA X Division Championship.

On the January 22, 2026 episode of Impact!, Alexander and Bear Bronson were introduced as the newest members of The System, while the stable also attacked Moose and JDC, turning heel, and kicking them out of the group. On the May 14 episode of Thursday Night Impact!, Alexander ended Slater's record-tying 298-day reign to win the TNA X Division Championship after defeating him 2–1 in a 2-out-of-3 falls match. At Slammiversary, Alexander defeated Amazing Red, Fabian Aichner, Frankie Kazarian, KC Navarro, Leon Slater and Mr. Elegance in an Ultimate X match to retain the title. On the July 16 episode of Thursday Night Impact!, Alexander defeated Fabian Aichner to retain the title. On August 23 at Lockdown, Alexander lost the title back to Slater in a Last Man Standing Steel Cage match.

== Other media ==
Alexander made his video game debut in WWE 2K18 and subsequently appears in WWE 2K19, WWE 2K20, WWE 2K22, WWE 2K23, WWE 2K24, and WWE 2K25.

== Personal life ==
In June 2018, Johnson married fellow professional wrestler Big Swole, and they have a daughter.

== Championships and accomplishments ==
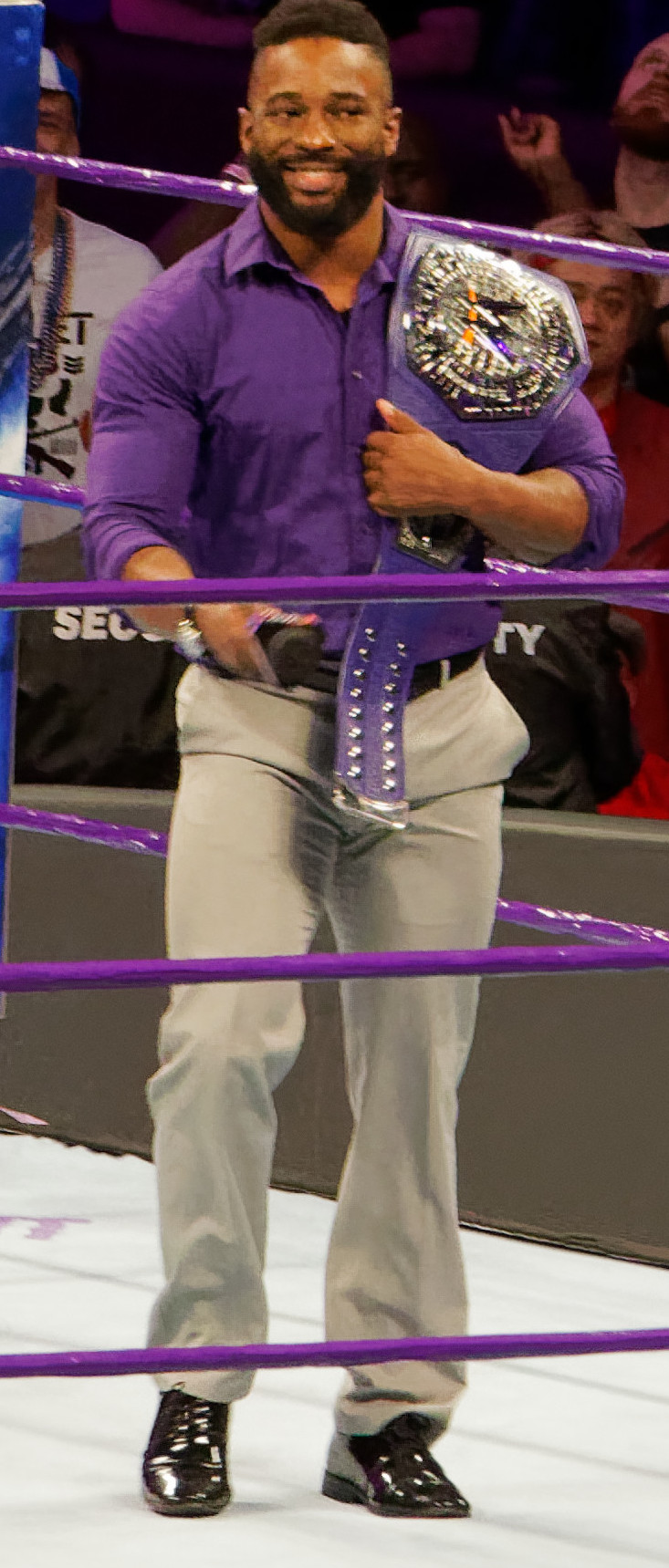
Alexander is a former WWE Cruiserweight Champion

- America's Most Liked Wrestling
  - AML Prestige Championship (1 time, inaugural)
  - AML Prestige Championship Tournament (2016)
- CWF Mid-Atlantic
  - CWF Mid-Atlantic Television Championship (1 time)
  - PWI Ultra J Championship (1 time)
- Exodus Wrestling Alliance
  - EWA Junior Heavyweight Championship (1 time)
- Premiere Wrestling Federation
  - PWF WORLD-1 Heavyweight Championship (1 time)
  - Match of the Year (2015) - with Colby Corino
- Premiere Wrestling Xperience
  - PWX Heavyweight Championship (1 time)
  - PWX Innovative Television Championship (1 time)
- Pro Wrestling EVO
  - EVO Heavyweight Championship (1 time)
- Pro Wrestling Illustrated
  - PWI ranked him No. 28 of the top 500 singles wrestlers in the PWI 500 in 2018
- Total Nonstop Action Wrestling
  - TNA X Division Championship (1 time)
- WrestleForce
  - WrestleForce Championship (2 times)
- WWE
  - WWE 24/7 Championship (3 times)
  - WWE Cruiserweight Championship (1 time)
  - WWE Raw Tag Team Championship (1 time) – with Shelton Benjamin
  - WWE Cruiserweight Championship Tournament (2018)
  - Slammy Award (1 time)
    - Trash Talker of the Year (2020) as The Hurt Business, shared with Lacey Evans
