= Supercard of Honor III =

2008 Ring of Honor event

- Promotion: Ring of Honor
- Date: March 29, 2008
- City: Orlando, Florida, United States
- Venue: Orlando Downtown Recreation Complex
- Attendance: 1,500

ROH event chronology
← Previous; Dragon Gate Challenge II	Next → Bedlam in Beantown

ROH Supercard of Honor chronology
← Previous; II	Next → IV

Supercard of Honor III was a professional wrestling event produced by Ring of Honor (ROH). It was the third Supercard of Honor and took place on March 29, 2008 at the Orlando Downtown Recreation Complex in Orlando, Florida. As with other Supercard of Honor events, it took place in the same weekend and same metropolitan area as WrestleMania XXIV.

Eight matches were contested as part of the event, with the third being a dark match. In the main event, Muscle Outlaw'z (Naruki Doi, Masato Yoshino and Genki Horiguchi) defeated Typhoon (Cima, Susumu Yokosuka and Ryo Saito). In other prominent matches, Nigel McGuinness defeated Austin Aries to retain the ROH World Championship, Roderick Strong retained the FIP World Heavyweight Championship in a no contest against Erick Stevens, and No Remorse Corps (Davey Richards and Rocky Romero) defeated The Vulture Squad (Jigsaw and Ruckus) to retain the ROH World Tag Team Championship.

== Production ==
Other on-screen personnel
Role	Name
Commentators	Dave Prazak
Commentators	Lenny Leonard

=== Storylines ===
Supercard of Honor III featured professional wrestling matches, which involved different wrestlers from pre-existing scripted feuds, plots, and storylines that played out on ROH's television programs. Wrestlers portrayed villains or heroes as they followed a series of events that built tension and culminated in a wrestling match or series of matches.

== Reception ==
Reviewing the event for Pro Wrestling Torch, Justin Parker gave the show a favorable review, describing it as "a highly recommended show [which] is ions better than the Friday night show from the same weekend and ROH's best show of the year."

== Results ==
No.	Results	Stipulations	Times
1	Go Shiozaki defeated Delirious	Singles match	12:14
2	The YRR (Chasyn Rance, Kenny King and Sal Rinauro) defeated Alex Payne, Bushwacker Luke and Dingo	Six-man tag team match	8:13
3^{D}	No Remorse Corps (Davey Richards and Rocky Romero) (c) defeated The Vulture Squad (Jigsaw and Ruckus)	Tag team match for the ROH World Tag Team Championship	8:41
4	Roderick Strong (c) vs. Erick Stevens ended in a no contest	Singles match for the FIP World Heavyweight Championship	—
5	The Age of the Fall (Jimmy Jacobs and Tyler Black) defeated The Briscoes (Jay Briscoe and Mark Briscoe)	Relaxed Rules tag team match	15:06
6	New Hazard (Shingo and B×B Hulk) defeated El Generico and Kevin Steen	Tag team match	17:49
7	Nigel McGuinness (c) defeated Austin Aries	Singles match for the ROH World Championship	24:44
8	Muscle Outlaw'z (Naruki Doi, Masato Yoshino and Genki Horiguchi) defeated Typhoon (Cima, Susumu Yokosuka and Ryo Saito)	Six-man tag team match	25:44
(c) / – the champion(s) heading into the match; D / – this was a dark match

== See also ==
- 2008 in professional wrestling
