= Supercard of Honor II =

2007 Ring of Honor event

- Promotion: Ring of Honor
- Date: March 31, 2007
- City: Detroit, Michigan, United States
- Venue: Michigan State Fairgrounds & Expo Center
- Attendance: 1,200

ROH event chronology
← Previous; All Star Extravaganza III	Next → This Means War II

ROH Supercard of Honor chronology
← Previous; I	Next → III

Supercard of Honor II was a professional wrestling event produced by Ring of Honor (ROH). It was the second Supercard of Honor and took place on March 31, 2007 at the Michigan State Fairgrounds & Expo Center in Detroit, Michigan. As with other Supercard of Honor events, it took place in the same weekend and same metropolitan area as WrestleMania 23.

Eleven matches were contested as part of the event, with the opener being a dark match. In the main event, Cima, Shingo and Susumu Yokosuka defeated Dragon Kid, Ryo Saito and Masaaki Mochizuki. In other prominent matches, Roderick Strong defeated Austin Aries to retain the FIP World Heavyweight Championship, and Jimmy Jacobs defeated B. J. Whitmer in a steel cage match.

== Production ==
Other on-screen personnel
Role	Name
Commentators	Dave Prazak
Commentators	Lenny Leonard

=== Storylines ===
Supercard of Honor II featured professional wrestling matches, which involved different wrestlers from pre-existing scripted feuds, plots, and storylines that played out on ROH's television programs. Wrestlers portrayed villains or heroes as they followed a series of events that built tension and culminated in a wrestling match or series of matches.

== Reception ==
Reviewing the event for Pro Wrestling Torch, Chris Vetter gave the show a favorable review, describing it as "a fun, fantastic event" and stating "If you didn’t like this show, then you shouldn’t bother watching any ROH shows. This show had a little bit of everything. A bloody cage match. Insane, quick high-flying. Brawling and mat-based wrestling. Good stuff all the way around".

== Results ==
No.	Results	Stipulations	Times
1^{D}	Bobby Dempsey defeated Alex Payne, Dingo, and Rhett Titus	Four corner survival match	—
2	Delirious and Jay Briscoe defeated Christopher Daniels and Matt Sydal	Tag team match	18:07
3	Claudio Castagnoli defeated Yamato	Singles match	6:55
4	Erick Stevens defeated Mitch Franklin	Do or Die match	0:40
5	Nigel McGuinness defeated Chris Hero (with Jonny Fairplay and Larry Sweeney)	Singles match	9:41
6	Jack Evans and Naruki Doi defeated No Remorse Corps (Davey Richards and Rocky Romero) (with Roderick Strong)	Tag team match	14:22
7	Homicide defeated Brent Albright by disqualification	Singles match	1:20
8	Colt Cabana and Homicide defeated Adam Pearce and Brent Albright	Tag team match	12:33
9	Jimmy Jacobs (with Lacey) defeated B. J. Whitmer (with Daizee Haze)	Pinfall or submission only steel cage match	24:34
10	Roderick Strong (c) defeated Austin Aries	Singles match for the FIP World Heavyweight Championship	21:56
11	Cima, Shingo and Susumu Yokosuka defeated Dragon Kid, Ryo Saito and Masaaki Mochizuki	Six-man tag team match	27:18
(c) / – the champion(s) heading into the match; D / – this was a dark match

== See also ==
- 2007 in professional wrestling
