= Supercard of Honor IV =

- Promotion: Ring of Honor
- Date: April 3, 2009
- City: Houston, Texas, United States
- Venue: George R. Brown Convention Center
- Attendance: 1,800

ROH event chronology
| ← Previous; 7th Anniversary Show | Next → Take No Prisoners |

ROH Supercard of Honor chronology
| ← Previous; III | Next → V |

Supercard of Honor IV was a professional wrestling event produced by Ring of Honor (ROH). It was the fourth Supercard of Honor and took place on April 3, 2009 at George R. Brown Convention Center in Houston, Texas. As with other Supercard of Honor events, it took place in the same weekend and same metropolitan area as WrestleMania 25.

Thirteen matches were contested as part of the event, the opening two of which were dark matches. In the main event, Jerry Lynn defeated Nigel McGuinness to claim the ROH World Championship. In another championship match, Kenta defeated Davey Richards to retain the GHC Junior Heavyweight Championship.

== Storylines ==
Supercard of Honor IV featured professional wrestling matches, which involved different wrestlers from pre-existing scripted feuds, plots, and storylines that played out on ROH's television programs. Wrestlers portrayed villains or heroes as they followed a series of events that built tension and culminated in a wrestling match or series of matches.

== Reception ==
Reviewing the event for 411mania.com, J.D. Dunn gave the show an overall rating of 8 out of 10, describing it as "Not the... blowout show that it has been in the past, Supercard still gives us a fantastic Match of the Year Candidate in Davey vs. KENTA and a huge title change", whilst also noting that "The undercard is filled with some not-so-good-but-memorable moments."

== Results ==
| No. | Results | Stipulations | Times |
|---|---|---|---|
| 1^{D} | Alex Payne and Andy Ridge defeated Ernie Osiris and Ninja Brown | Tag team match | 6:39 |
| 2^{D} | Bushwhacker Luke and Grizzly Redwood defeated Andy Dalton and Don Juan | Tag team match | 4:18 |
| 3 | Erick Stevens defeated Rhett Titus | Singles match | 6:46 |
| 4 | Incognito, Chris Hero and Eddie Edwards (with Larry Sweeney) defeated Jay Briscoe, Kevin Steen and Magno | Six-man tag team match | 14:15 |
| 5 | Roderick Strong defeated Katsuhiko Nakajima | Singles match | 9:30 |
| 6 | Claudio Castagnoli defeated Blue Demon Jr., Brent Albright and El Generico | Four corner survival match | 9:16 |
| 7 | Bryan Danielson defeated Alex Koslov | Singles match | 15:15 |
| 8 | D-Lo Brown defeated Colt Cabana | Singles match | 11:00 |
| 9 | Kenta (c) (with Eddie Edwards) defeated Davey Richards | Singles match for the GHC Junior Heavyweight Championship | 18:32 |
| 10 | Austin Aries and Jimmy Jacobs defeated Necro Butcher and Tyler Black | Tag Team match | 10:55 |
| 11 | Jerry Lynn defeated Nigel McGuinness (c) | Singles match for the ROH World Championship | 19:03 |
(c) / – the champion(s) heading into the match; D / – this was a dark match

== See also ==
- 2009 in professional wrestling
