= Supercard of Honor XII =

Professional wrestling pay-per-view event

- Official event poster featuring Cody, Kenny Omega, Kota Ibushi and Brandi Rhodes
- Promotion: Ring of Honor
- Date: April 7, 2018
- City: New Orleans, Louisiana, United States
- Venue: UNO Lakefront Arena
- Attendance: 6,100

Pay-per-view chronology
← Previous; 16th Anniversary Show	Next → ROH/NJPW War of the Worlds Tour

ROH Supercard of Honor chronology
← Previous; XI	Next → G1 Supercard

Supercard of Honor XII was a professional wrestling pay-per-view event produced by American promotion Ring of Honor (ROH), which took place Saturday, April 7, 2018, at the UNO Lakefront Arena in New Orleans, Louisiana. Wrestlers from New Japan Pro-Wrestling (NJPW) – with whom ROH has a partnership – also appeared at the event. Also, wrestlers from the Japan based women's promotion World Wonder Ring Stardom appeared on the show as part of the tournament to crown the inaugural Women of Honor Champion – ROH's first women's championship.

== Background ==
Other on-screen personnel
Role	Name
Commentators	Colt Cobana
Commentators	Ian Riccaboni
Commentators	Shane Taylor
Commentators	Austin Aries

=== Storylines ===
This professional wrestling event featured professional wrestling matches, which involve different wrestlers from pre-existing scripted feuds, plots, and storylines that play out on ROH's television program, Ring of Honor Wrestling'. Wrestlers portray villains or heroes as they follow a series of events that build tension and culminate in a wrestling match or series of matches.

At Dominion 6.11 in Osaka-jo Hall during Kenny Omega’s IWGP Heavyweight Championship match against champ Kazuchika Okada, Cody Rhodes would come out with intentions to throw to towel in on behalf of Omega. The Young Bucks would stop this but Omega would fail to win the match. At the G1 Special in USA Omega would return the favor looking to throw in the towel on behalf of Cody during his IWGP Title shot against Okada, Cody would lose the match. At New Year’s Dash!! after winning a 10-man tag match Cody would look to attack Kota Ibushi but Ibushi was saved by Omega. At The New Beginning in Sapporo (2018) Omega would lose the IWGP United States Heavyweight Championship to “Switchblade” Jay White. After the match Hangman Page would look to challenge the new champ but was stopped by Kenny. This brought out Bullet Club member Cody, Marty Scurll, and Matt Jackson. In the chaos Omega accidentally push Matt on his injured back. Cody then hit Omega with Cross Rhodes and looked to attack Omega with a chair but was saved by Ibushi. Omega and Ibushi embraced and reunited the Golden Lovers. At Honor Rising Cody, Page, and Scurll beat the Golden Lovers and Chase Owens, the next the Lovers beat Scurll and Cody. Afterwards, the Young Bucks announced their move to the heavyweight division and challenged Ibushi and Omega. At ROH 16th Anniversary Show Omega dressed as Bury the Drug Free Bear attacked Cody, afterward Brandi Rhodes kissed Kenny. At Strong Style Evolved the Golden Lovers beat the Young Bucks, after the match Cody pushed Nick Jackson in a very similar Omega had pushed Matt. At Sakura Genesis Page and Cody beat the Golden Lovers.

== Results ==
No.	Results	Stipulations	Times
1^{D}	Brian Milonas and The Beer City Bruiser defeated Luke Hawx & PJ Hawx and The Motor City Machine Guns (Alex Shelley & Chris Sabin)	Triple threat tag team match	6:18
2^{P}	Kelly Klein defeated Mayu Iwatani	Women of Honor World Championship tournament semifinal	9:02
3^{P}	Sumie Sakai defeated Tenille Dashwood	Women of Honor World Championship tournament semifinal	7:57
4	Chuckie T. (with Trent Beretta) defeated Jonathan Gresham	Singles match	8:33
5	Punishment Martinez defeated Tomohiro Ishii	Singles match	8:12
6	Kota Ibushi defeated Hangman Page	Singles match	14:36
7	Sumie Sakai defeated Kelly Klein	Tournament final for the inaugural Women of Honor World Championship	7:38
8	SoCal Uncensored (Christopher Daniels, Frankie Kazarian and Scorpio Sky) (c) defeated Flip Gordon and The Young Bucks (Matt Jackson and Nick Jackson)	Ladder War VIII for the ROH World Six-Man Tag Team Championship	24:08
9	The Briscoes (Mark and Jay Briscoe) (c) defeated Jay Lethal and Hiroshi Tanahashi	Tag team match for the ROH World Tag Team Championship	19:39
10	Silas Young defeated Kenny King (c)	Last Man Standing match for the ROH World Television Championship	16:04
11	Bully Ray and Cheeseburger vs. The Dawgs (Rhett Titus and Will Ferrara) ended in a no contest	Tag team match	2:10
12	Cody (with Brandi Rhodes) defeated Kenny Omega	Singles match	37:15
13	Dalton Castle (c) defeated Marty Scurll	Singles match for the ROH World Championship	31:37
(c) / – the champion(s) heading into the match; D / – this was a dark match; P / – the match was broadcast on the pre-show

=== Qualifying matches ===
Ring of Honor Wrestling tapings – January and February of 2018 (And probably in November & December of 2017 as well.) (2300 Arena – Philadelphia, Pennsylvania)

No.	Results	Stipulations
1	Jessie Brooks defeated Gabby Ortiz (5:45)	Women of Honor Championship Qualifying Match
2	Brandi Rhodes defeated Stella Grey (5:50)	Women of Honor Championship Qualifying Match

=== Tournament bracket ===
First Round; ROH Wrestling / Women of Honor tapings
Mandy Leon	Pin
Madison Rayne	7:30
Jessie Brooks	8:21
Kelly Klein	Pin
HZK	11:48
Mayu Iwatani	Pin
Deonna Purrazzo	Sub
Holidead	6:18
Jenny Rose	8:37
Kagetsu	Pin
Hana Kimura	8:00
Sumie Sakai	Pin
Stacy Shadows	9:14
Tenille Dashwood	Pin
Karen Q	7:28
Brandi Rhodes	Pin

Quarterfinals; ROH Wrestling / Women of Honor tapings
Mandy Leon	9:09
Kelly Klein	KO
Mayu Iwatani	Pin
Deonna Purrazzo	9:28
Kagetsu	7:36
Sumie Sakai	Pin
Tenille Dashwood	Pin
Brandi Rhodes	7:29

Semifinals; ROH Wrestling / Women of Honor tapings
Kelly Klein	Sub
Mayu Iwatani	9:00
Sumie Sakai	Pin
Tenille Dashwood	7:53

Final; Supercard of Honor XII; April 7, 2018
Kelly Klein	7:46
Sumie Sakai	Pin

== See also ==
- 2018 in professional wrestling
- List of Ring of Honor pay-per-view events
