= Supercard of Honor =

2006 Ring of Honor event

- Promotion: Ring of Honor
- Date: March 31, 2006
- City: Chicago Ridge, Illinois, United States
- Venue: Frontier Fieldhouse
- Attendance: 1,100

ROH event chronology
← Previous; Dragon Gate Challenge	Next → Better Than Our Best

ROH Supercard of Honor chronology
← Previous; First	Next → II

Supercard of Honor was a professional wrestling event produced by Ring of Honor (ROH). It was the first Supercard of Honor and took place on March 31, 2006 at Frontier Fieldhouse in Chicago Ridge, Illinois. As with other Supercard of Honor events, it took place in the same weekend and same metropolitan area as WrestleMania 22.

Ten matches were contested as part of the event. In the main event, Bryan Danielson defeated Roderick Strong to retain the ROH World Championship. In other prominent matches, Do Fixer (Dragon Kid, Genki Horiguchi and Ryo Saito) defeated Blood Generation (Cima, Naruki Doi and Masato Yoshino), and AJ Styles and Matt Sydal defeated Generation Next (Austin Aries and Jack Evans).

== Production ==
Other on-screen personnel
Role	Name
Commentators	Dave Prazak
Commentators	Lenny Leonard

=== Storylines ===
Supercard of Honor featured professional wrestling matches, which involved different wrestlers from pre-existing scripted feuds, plots, and storylines that played out on ROH's television programs. Wrestlers portrayed villains or heroes as they followed a series of events that built tension and culminated in a wrestling match or series of matches.

== Reception ==
Reviewing the event for 411mania.com, Brad Garoon and Jacob Ziegler gave the show an overall rating of 8.5 out of 10, describing it as "a must buy", whilst also noting "The problem is that it’s way too long and the first half goes by too slow. I understand the “Supercard” concept but I also understand the “really long wrestling show” concept, and sometimes less is more."

Wrestling journalist Dave Meltzer of the Wrestling Observer Newsletter gave the six-man tag team match between Do Fixer and Blood Generation a rare rating of five stars out of five, his last before the main event of WWE Money in the Bank 2011.

== Results ==
No.	Results	Stipulations	Times
1	Samoa Joe and Adam Pearce defeated Hardcore Wrestler #1 and Hardcore Wrestler #2	Tag team match	0:58
2	Ricky Reyes defeated Delirious, Flash Flanagan, and Shane Hagadorn	Four corner survival match	6:54
3	The Embassy (Alex Shelley and Jimmy Rave) (with Prince Nana) defeated Claudio Castagnoli and Jimmy Yang	Tag team match	16:04
4	Ace Steel defeated Chad Collyer	First blood match	11:52
5	AJ Styles and Matt Sydal defeated Generation Next (Austin Aries and Jack Evans)	Tag team match	17:47
6	Do Fixer (Dragon Kid, Genki Horiguchi and Ryo Saito) defeated Blood Generation (Cima, Naruki Doi and Masato Yoshino)	Six-man tag team match	20:34
7	MsChif defeated Allison Danger, Cheerleader Melissa, Daizee Haze, Lacey, and Rain	Six-woman mayhem match	8:44
8	Homicide (with Julius Smokes) defeated Mitch Franklin	Singles match	2:35
9	Samoa Joe defeated Jimmy Jacobs (with Lacey) and Christopher Daniels	Three-way match	9:14
10	Bryan Danielson (c) defeated Roderick Strong	Singles match for the ROH World Championship	56:05
(c) / – the champion(s) heading into the match

== See also ==
- 2006 in professional wrestling
