= Supercard of Honor V =

Professional wrestling event

- Promotion: Ring of Honor
- Date: May 8, 2010
- City: New York City, New York, United States
- Venue: Manhattan Center
- Attendance: 1,500

ROH event chronology
← Previous; The Big Bang!	Next → Death Before Dishonor VIII

Supercard of Honor chronology
← Previous; IV	Next → VI

Supercard of Honor V was a professional wrestling event produced by Ring of Honor (ROH). It was the 5th Supercard of Honor and took place on May 8, 2010 at Manhattan Center in New York City, New York.

== Production ==
Other on-screen personnel
Role	Name
Commentators	Joe Dombrowski
Commentators	Dave Prazak

=== Storylines ===
Supercard of Honor V featured professional wrestling matches, which involved different wrestlers from pre-existing scripted feuds, plots, and storylines that played out on ROH's television programs. Wrestlers portrayed villains or heroes as they followed a series of events that built tension and culminated in a wrestling match or series of matches.

== Results ==
No.	Results	Stipulations	Times
1	Briscoe Brothers (Jay Briscoe and Mark Briscoe) defeated The All Night Express (Kenny King and Rhett Titus)	Tag team match	12:53
2	Erick Stevens defeated Grizzly Redwood (with Prince Nana and Ernie Osiris)	Singles match	6:47
3	Sara Del Rey defeated Amazing Kong	Singles match	7:12
4	Christopher Daniels defeated Eddie Edwards	Singles match	17:50
5	Austin Aries defeated Delirious (with Daizee Haze) by disqualification	Singles match	2:24
6	Kevin Steen defeated Colt Cabana	34th Street Deathmatch	14:23
7	Colt Cabana defeated Christopher Daniels	Singles match	8:52
8	The Kings of Wrestling (Claudio Castagnoli and Chris Hero) (c) defeated The Motor City Machine Guns (Chris Sabin and Alex Shelley) by disqualification	Tag Team match for the ROH World Tag Team Championship	22:07
9	Tyler Black (c) defeated Roderick Strong	Singles match for the ROH World Championship	27:11
(c) / – the champion(s) heading into the match

== See also ==
- 2010 in professional wrestling
