= Dalton Castle (wrestler) =

American professional wrestler

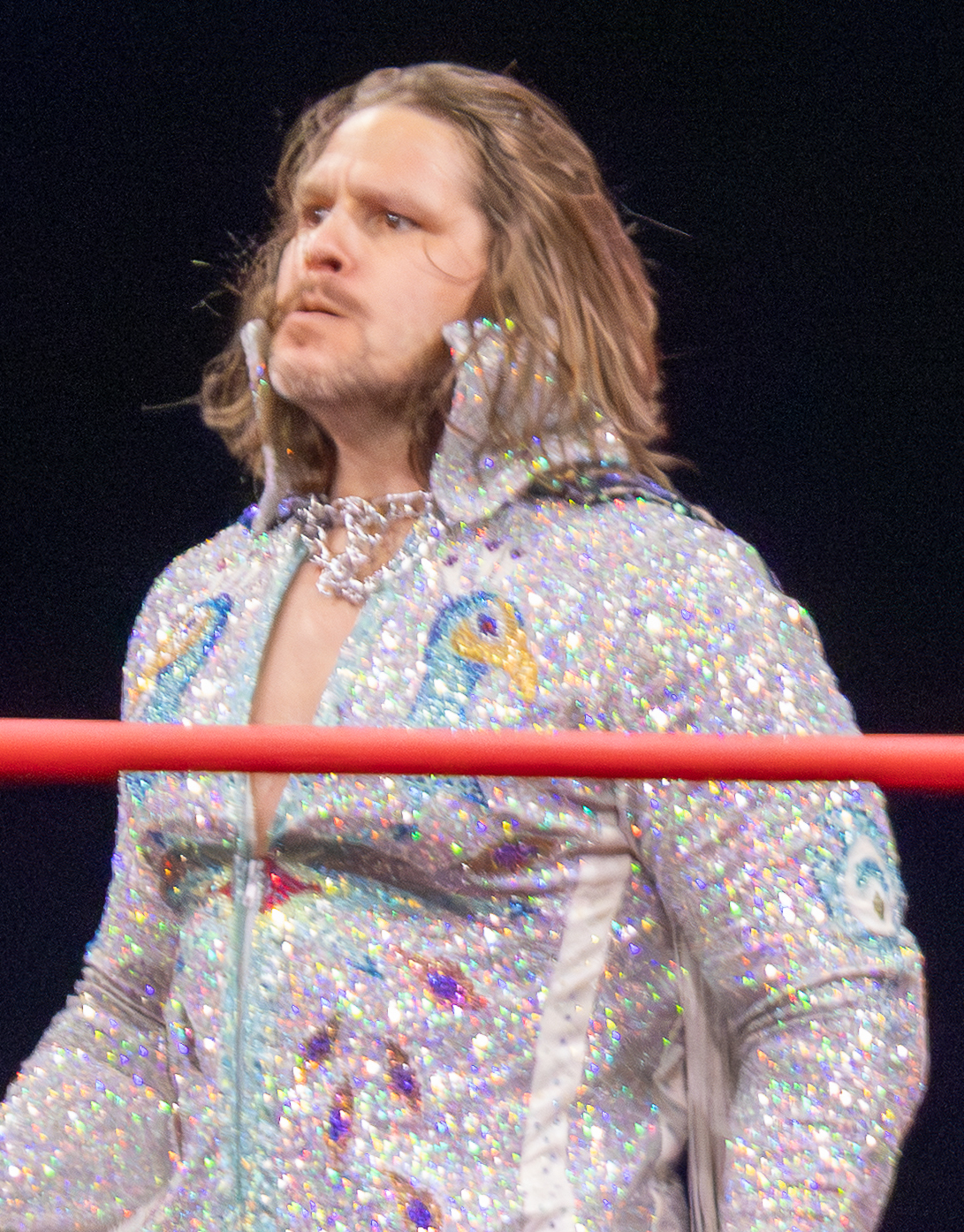
- Castle at Supercard of Honor 2026

Personal information
- Born: Brett Giehl; March 4, 1986 (age 40) Greece, New York, U.S.
- Education: State University of New York at Cortland

Professional wrestling career
- Ring name(s): Ashley Remington; Brett Giehl; Dalton Caroline Castle; Dalton Castle; Hombre de Pavo Real de Montana
- Billed height: 5 ft 11 in (180 cm)
- Billed weight: 217 lb (98 kg)
- Billed from: Catalina Island (in ROH); Rochester, New York; The Open Waters (in Chikara)
- Debut: 2009

Brett Giehl (born March 4, 1986), better known by the ring name Dalton Castle, is an American professional wrestler. He is signed to All Elite Wrestling (AEW) and Ring of Honor (ROH), where he is a one-time ROH World Champion, a one-time ROH World Television Champion, and a former three-time ROH World Six-Man Tag Team Champion. He is also known for his tenure in Chikara, where he wrestled under the ring names Ashley Remington and Dalton Caroline Castle.

== Early and personal life ==
Giehl was born in Greece, New York. As a child, he loved professional wrestler "Macho Man" Randy Savage, with other favorites including Curt Hennig, Davey Boy Smith, and Frank Gotch. Giehl wrestled more than 10 years from middle school to college, representing the Greece Athena High School Trojans in 2003 and winning a varsity wrestling tournament in the 171 pound weight class in 2004. He attended the State University of New York at Cortland, receiving a degree in communications and theater.

Giehl was an amateur and NCAA wrestler, winning a New York championship in Greco-Roman wrestling and competing three times on the NCAA All-State Team. He was also a member of Team USA, traveling internationally for the World Championships. In 2010, he attained a second championship at the Beach National, winning 1st place in the 215 lb division representing Livonia WC.

After graduating, Giehl worked as a disc jockey in Albany, New York. In 2011, Giehl was an emcee for WZNE in Rochester, New York under the name The Giehl. During his tenure at the station, he interviewed fellow professional wrestler Kurt Angle. Giehl went on to work for WQBK-FM from 2011 until 2014, hosting a five-hour afternoon slot on the radio under the Dalton Castle moniker. Beginning January 2012, the company's YouTube channel hosted a series called The Sisterhood of the Traveling Tights where Castle interviewed professional wrestlers. His guests included Brodie Lee, Velvet Sky, CM Punk, Matt Hardy, and Dean Ambrose.

Giehl is married as of 2015.

== Professional wrestling career ==
=== Early career (2009–2015) ===
During 2009 in Next Era Wrestling (held in The Auditorium Center in Rochester, New York) after defeating Brett Mednik (April 18) and Brandon Thurston (June 20) he unsuccessfully challenged Josh Jordan (the Northeastern Champion) on July 18 but they later team together.

On August 2, 2009, he defeated Marc Krieger at an Empire State Wrestling (ESW) event, preceding an August 15 loss to Bobby Fish.

Castle spent one year with ESW until he left the promotion.

In May and June 2010, he had two title matches against Krieger for the Northeastern Championship, losing the first and winning the second by disqualification.

In 2011, Castle returned to ESW, where he and his partner Will Calrissian won the ESW Tag Team Championship by defeating The Rochester Wrecking Crew (Hellcat and Rob Sweet) at ESW WrestleBash.

They held it 238 days until June 1, 2013, when it was dropped to The Flatliners (Asylum and Matt Burns) at ESW Aftershock. However, the team broke up afterward.

In November 2011 Castle worked with International Wrestling Cartel (IWC), where he won the IWC World Heavyweight Championship on December 14, 2013.

He lost the title on January 24, 2015, to RJ City in Elizabeth, Pennsylvania.

Dalton is the second longest reigning IWC World Heavyweight Champion, having held the title 406 days.

On May 9, 2015, he faced Tommy Dreamer for the title in a four-way elimination match that also included RJ City and Justin LaBar, but was defeated.

=== Chikara (2013–2015) ===
While Wrestling one of his Intense's final on September 15, 2013, Darkness Crabtree's match with Jervis Cottonbelly went to a no contest after the reformed GEKIDO attacked and tore down the show, with Gekido ultimately "killing off" Crabtree.

In a series of videos titled "Rough Waters" posted to Chikara's YouTube channel, it was revealed that Crabtree left a will granting a great deal of money to his kayfabe nephew Dalton "Caroline" Castle, causing Castle to alter his image to that of a wealthy yachtsman and adopt the new name of Ashley Remington.

Remington's debut match in Chikara was on May 25, 2014, at You Only Live Twice, where he defeated Chuck Taylor.

He would become quite popular with Chikara fans over the duration of that season, and would end the year with a successful victory over Juan Francisco de Coronado, in a German suplex match.

In 2015, Remington joined The Battle Hive with Amasis, Fire Ant, and Worker Ant. He also gained his third point for title contention in 2015, and at the Anniversario event in May, he challenged Grand Champion Hallowicked in a losing effort.

=== Ring of Honor / All Elite Wrestling (2013–present) ===
==== Initial years (2013–2016) ====
Dalton Castle debuted in Ring of Honor (ROH) at Dragon's Reign on May 11, 2013, by taking on Jimmy Nutts. The match abruptly ended when Rhett Titus attacked both men. At Future of Honor #2, Castle participated in a gauntlet match, losing to Bobby Fish.

On the January 31, 2015 episode of Ring of Honor Wrestling, Castle made his televised debut in ROH. He was accompanied by The Boys (dubbed "Boy 1" and "Boy 2") and competed in the Top Prospect Tournament, losing to Ashley Six in the first round. On the March 21 episode of Ring of Honor Wrestling, the tournament winner Donovan Dijak opted to give up his shot at the ROH World Television Championship against Jay Lethal to instead join The House of Truth, prompting Castle to challenge Lethal for the title, which Lethal accepted. However, Castle failed to win due to interference by Dijak and J. Diesel. This led to a match between Castle and Dijak on the April 18 episode of Ring of Honor Wrestling, which Castle lost due to interference by Truth Martini.

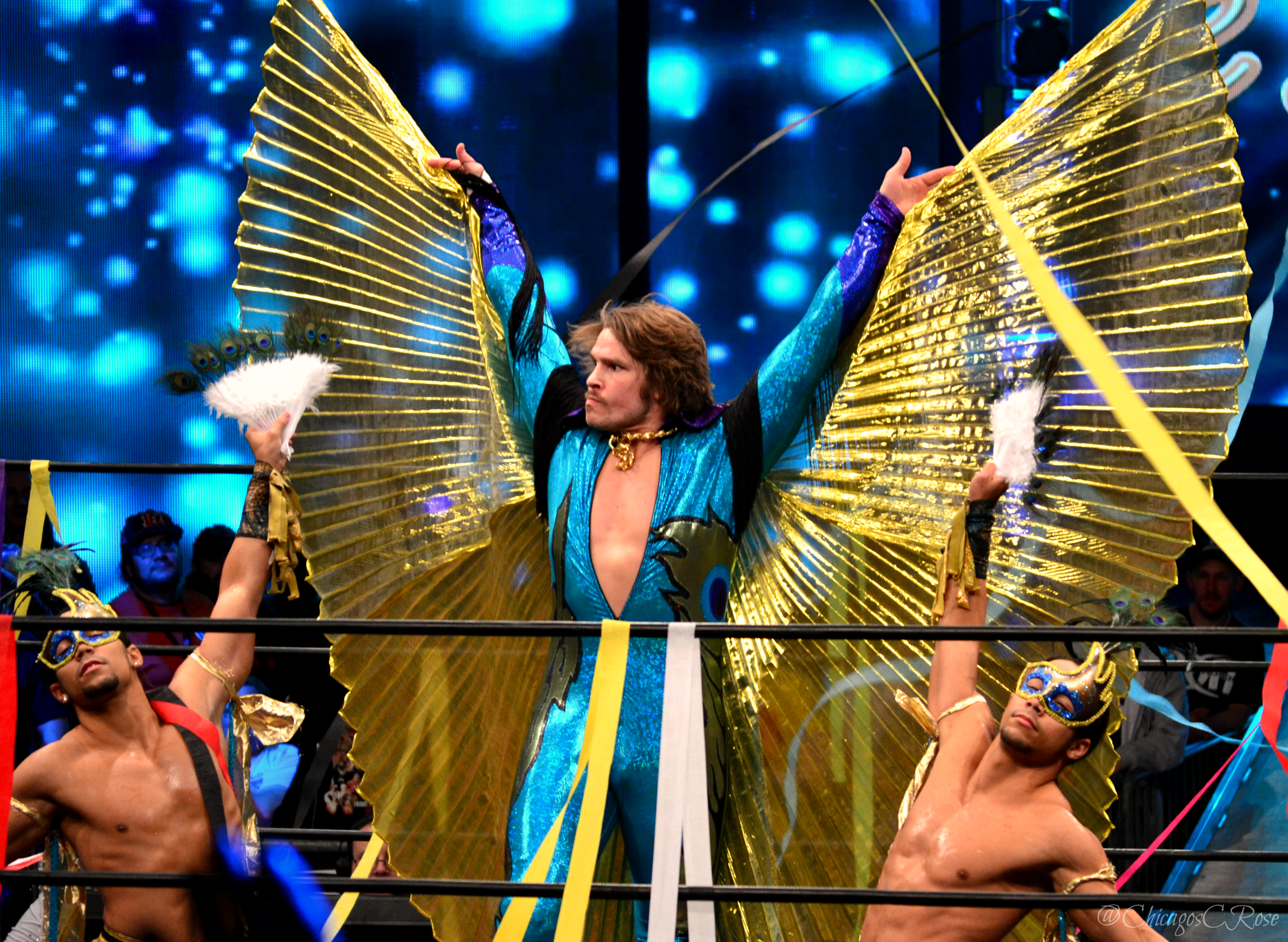
A picture of Dalton Castle with The Boys – one Boy on the left and one Boy on the right while Dalton in the middle at a ROH taping event.

On the second night of Global Wars, Castle lost to Jushin Liger in a match which he later described as his favorite. After a win over Romantic Touch on the May 29 episode of Ring of Honor Wrestling, Castle challenged Silas Young to a match at Best in the World to prove Young's claim of "Last Real Man of Professional Wrestling" wrong. Castle went on to defeat Young at the event, marking the former's pay-per-view debut. However, an enraged Young attacked one of Castle's Boys after the match. After a win over Takaaki Watanabe on the July 8 episode of Ring of Honor Wrestling, Castle lost to Adam Cole at Death Before Dishonor XIII.

Castle continued his rivalry with Young wanting to take his Boys and make them "real men". At Field of Honor, Castle competed in a gauntlet match to earn an opportunity for the World Television Championship. He eliminated Hangman Page and Frankie Kazarian, before being eliminated by Young. At All Star Extravaganza VII, Castle competed against Young in a match which stipulated that if Young won, he would get The Boys, while if Young lost, he would become one of Castle's Boys. Castle subsequently lost the match, with Young getting The Boys. At Glory By Honor XIV, Castle replaced an injured ACH on the team of ROH All-Stars Moose and The Addiction (Christopher Daniels and Frankie Kazarian) against ROH Champions (Jay Lethal, Roderick Strong and The Kingdom (Matt Taven and Mike Bennett) in an eight-man tag team match, which ROH Champions won. At Survival of the Fittest, Castle participated in the namesake tournament, facing Young and Adam Page in a three-way match in the opening round, which Young won by pinning Castle. Castle faced Young in another losing effort at Final Battle, but despite The Boys seemingly siding with Young in the weeks prior to the event, they rejoined Castle following the match. After losing to Hirooki Goto at 14th Anniversary Show, Castle concluded his rivalry with Young by defeating him in a Fight Without Honor, with help from The Boys, on the April 13 episode of Ring of Honor Wrestling. This was the first Fight Without Honor to occur on the weekly television program, with previous editions taking place at pay-per-view events.

After winning a Six-Man Mayhem at Supercard of Honor X, Castle defeated A.C.H., Adam Page and Roderick Strong in a Four Corner Survival match at Global Wars, to earn a World Television Championship match against Bobby Fish at Best in the World, which he failed to win. Castle would then compete in high-profile matches against ROH's partner New Japan Pro-Wrestling talent Kazuchika Okada at Death Before Dishonor XIV, and Kushida at Field of Honor.

At All Star Extravaganza VIII, Castle teamed with Colt Cabana defeated The All Night Express (Rhett Titus and Kenny King), War Machine (Hanson and Raymond Rowe), and the team of Shane Taylor and Keith Lee in a four corner survival match won to earn a future ROH World Tag Team Championship match. They challenged The Young Bucks (Matt Jackson and Nick Jackson) for the titles at Glory By Honor XV, which they failed to win. Castle then participated in the 2016 Survival of the Fittest, defeating Chris Sabin and Rhett Titus in the first round, to qualify for the six-man mayhem in the final, which he failed to win. On the November 19 episode of Ring of Honor Wrestling, Cabana turned on Castle by attacking him and The Boys, thus splitting up the tag team. As a result, Castle began feuding with Cabana, leading to a match between the two at Final Battle, which Castle won.

==== ROH World Champion (2017–2018) ====
At the 15th Anniversary Show pay-per-view on March 10, 2017, Castle and The Boys unsuccessfully challenged The Kingdom (Matt Taven, T. K. O'Ryan and Vinny Marseglia) for the ROH World Six-Man Tag Team Championship. Castle would soon challenge Christopher Daniels for the ROH World Championship at Supercard of Honor XI, which he failed to win. Castle and The Boys would soon begin feuding with Bully Ray and The Briscoes (Jay Briscoe and Mark Briscoe), losing to them in a Milwaukee Street Fight at Unauthorized. However, at Best in the World, Castle and Boys defeated Bully Ray and Briscoes to capture the World Six-Man Tag Team Championship, marking Castle's first title win in ROH. After two successful title defenses, Castle and The Boys lost the titles to Bullet Club's Adam Page and The Young Bucks (Matt Jackson and Nick Jackson) on August 20 during the War of the Worlds UK tour.

Shortly after the title loss, Castle achieved major success in singles competition, by participating in the Soaring Eagle Cup tournament, which he won by defeating Flip Gordon in the first round, and Frankie Kazarian, Matt Taven and Silas Young in the final, a Four Way Elimination match. Castle capitalized on his win and challenged Cody for the ROH World CHampionship at Final Battle. Castle defeated Cody to win the title, marking his first world championship win. Castle made his first successful title defense against the 2017 Survival of the Fittest winner Punishment Martinez on the February 11, 2018 episode of Ring of Honor Wrestling. He would make his second title defense against Beretta and Beer City Bruiser in a three-way match at Honor Rising: Japan. Castle would continue to retain his title in major title defenses against Jay Lethal at 16th Anniversary Show, Marty Scurll at Supercard of Honor XII, Evil at Honor United, and Cody and Marty Scurll in a three-way match at Best in the World. Castle suffered a back injury during this time, forcing him to drop the title to Jay Lethal in a four corner survival match, also involving Cody and Matt Taven, on the July 21 (taped June 30) episode of Ring of Honor Wrestling.

Castle returned to ROH from his injury in October, and participated in the 2018 Survival of the Fittest, competing against Colin Delaney and Hangman Page. Castle failed to win the match. Castle would then begin a rivalry with Matt Taven, stemming from the fact that their scheduled title match for the World Championship was canceled earlier in the year due to Castle's injury. This led to a match between the two at Final Battle, which Castle lost.

==== Teaming with Joe Hendry and World Television Champion (2019–2021) ====
On the January 5, 2019 episode of Ring of Honor Wrestling, Castle defeated Chris Sabin, Flip Gordon and Marty Scurll in a four corner survival match to become the #1 contender for the ROH World Championship, challenging Jay Lethal for the title at Honor Reigns Supreme, which he failed to win. At Honor Rising: Japan, Castle unsuccessfully challenged Will Ospreay for the NEVER Openweight Championship. At G1 Supercard, Castle quickly lost to Rush in just fifteen seconds. After the match, an enraged Castle attacked the Boys and left the ring. On the May 4 episode of Ring of Honor Westling, Castle apologized to The Boys but attacked them again, thus turning into a villain.

Castle would then begin feuding with Rush over the quick loss at G1 Supercard. At State of the Art, the two participated in a gauntlet match to determine the #1 contenders for the World Tag Team Championship. They eliminated Shane Taylor and Silas Young, but were counted-out due to brawling with each other, leading to their opponents Coast 2 Coast (LSG and Shaheem Ali) to advance. Castle then challenged Rush's brother Dragon Lee to a match at Best in the World, which Castle won. This led to a grudge match between Castle and Rush at Mass Hysteria, which Castle lost via disqualification after hitting Rush with a low blow. Castle followed the assault by hitting Rush in the head and left shoulder with a chair. This led to a no disqualification match between the two at Summer Supercard, which Rush won.

At Honor For All, Castle began teaming with Joe Hendry by defeating Shinobi Shadow Squad (Cheeseburger and Eli Isom). At Global Wars Espectacular, Castle and Hendry lost to the team of Jay Lethal and Jonathan Gresham. Castle then participated in a tournament to determine the #1 contender for the ROH World Championship at Final Battle, defeating Mark Haskins in the first round, before losing to eventual winner PCO in the semi-final at Glory By Honor XVII. Castle continued to team with Hendry, losing to 2 Guys 1 Tag (Josh Woods and Silas Young) at Final Battle. Castle and Hendry teamed in various matches during late 2019 and early 2020, before splitting up as ROH went on a hiatus during the outbreak of the COVID-19 pandemic in the United States.

After ROH resumed holding events in the summer of 2020, Castle participated in a tournament for the reinstated ROH Pure Championship, where he lost to Jay Lethal in the opening round. At Final Battle, Castle challenged Rey Horus to an impromptu match, which Castle lost. In early 2021, Castle began feuding with Josh Woods after the two traded wins in Pure Rules matches, leading to a match between the two at 19th Anniversary Show, which Castle won.

On the April 24 episode of Ring of Honor Wrestling, Castle interrupted a match between Dak Draper and Eli Isom to recruit them as his proteges to improve the showmanship of ROH. At Best in the World, Castle, Draper and Isom unsuccessfully challenged Shane Taylor Promotions (Shane Taylor and Soldiers of Savagery (Kaun and Moses)) for the World Six-Man Tag Team Championship. As a result, Castle competed against Draper and Isom in a three-way match on the July 23 episode of Ring of Honor Wrestling, which Draper won after Castle threw a chair to Isom's head. This led to a match between Castle and Isom at Death Before Dishonor XVIII, which Castle won after assistance by Draper.

On the November 21 episode of Ring of Honor Wrestling, Castle defeated Dragon Lee to win the World Television Championship after assistance by Draper. However, at Final Battle in December 2021, Castle lost the title to Rhett Titus in a four corners survival match, also involving Joe Hendry and Silas Young. Following the event, ROH went on a hiatus.

==== Reunion with The Boys (2022–2024) ====
After ROH's purchase by All Elite Wrestling's (AEW) co-owner Tony Khan on March 2, 2022, ROH held its first event of 2022 on April 1, titled Supercard of Honor XV, where Castle reunited with The Boys, turning face once more. Castle defeated his former tag team partner Joe Hendry at the event. Castle made his AEW debut at Battle of the Belts II on April 16, 2022, where he unsuccessfully challenged Jonathan Gresham for the ROH World Championship. Castle and The Boys frequently began appearing on Dark and Dark: Elevation, winning all of their matches and successfully defending the ROH World Six-Man Tag Team Championship against Primal Fear, and The Trustbusters. At Death Before Dishonor in July 2022, Castle and the Boys defeated The Righteous (Vincent, Bateman, and Dutch) to win their second ROH World Six-Man Tag Team Championship. On the October 14, 2022 episode of Rampage, Castle challenged Chris Jericho to a match for the ROH World Championship on the Title Tuesday episode of Dynamite on October 18, which Castle failed to win. At Final Battle in December 2022, Castle and The Boys lost the ROH World Six-Man Team Team Championship to The Embassy (Brian Cage and Gates of Agony (Kaun and Toa Liona)), ending their reign at 140 days.

In July 2023, it was announced that Castle would participate in a four-man tournament to determine the #1 contender for the World Television Championship at Death Before Dishonor. During the tournament, Castle made it to the finals and defeated Shane Taylor to become the #1 contender. At Death Before Dishonor, Dalton Castle pressed Samoa Joe before outside interference from Stokely Hathaway prevented a clean finish to the match. At Final Battle on December 15, Castle participated in a Survival of the Fittest match for the vacant ROH World Television Championship. He would be eliminated by Lee Moriarty due to interference from Johnny TV. In the following weeks, Castle would appear in various segments in attempts to have a match with Johnny TV to seek revenge for Survival of the Fittest. Johnny TV would rebuff Castle until February 2024, where he agreed to a match with Castle for the custody of The Boys. On the February 29 episode of Ring of Honor Wrestling, Johnny TV defeated Castle and gained custody of The Boys. In the next three weeks, Castle would hound Johnny TV and his wife, Taya Valkyrie, to return The Boys until Johnny TV revealed that he had lost them after a (kayfabe) bear attack on a mountain. In April, The Boys were released from AEW and ROH.

==== Singles competition (2024–2025) ====
At Supercard of Honor, Castle defeated Johnny TV in a Fight without Honor with assistance from multiple Boys which included Jack Cartwheel and Paul Walter Hauser. On July 13, 2024, episode of Collision, Castle lost to Roderick Strong in a match to determine who would face Mark Briscoe for the ROH World Championship at Death Before Dishonor. During the match, Castle sustained a torn bicep in a "freak accident". A week later, Tony Khan announced that Castle would be sidelined for the rest of the year. On the June 5, 2025 episode of Ring of Honor Wrestling, a vignette was aired featuring Castle and several Boys, teasing his return.

==== Teaming with the Outrunners (2025–present) ====
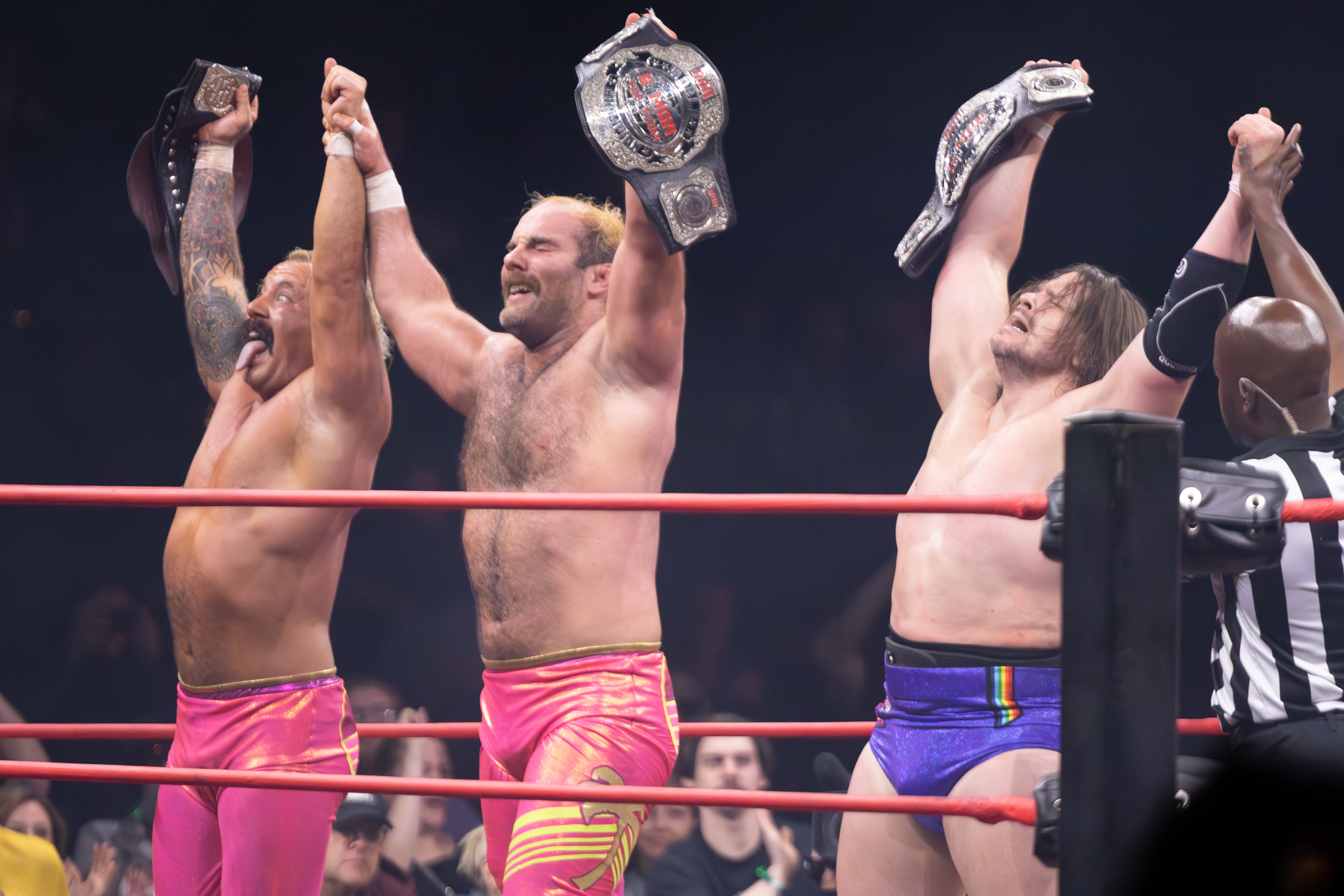
Castle (second from right) as one third of the ROH World Six-Man Tag Team Champions alongside The Outrunners at Supercard of Honor 2026.

Castle made his in-ring return on the September 27 episode of Collision, teaming with The Outrunners (Truth Magnum and Turbo Floyd) to defeat enhancement talents in a squash match. On December 5 at Final Battle, Castle unsuccessfully challenged Ricochet for the AEW National Championship. On May 15, 2026, at Supercard of Honor, Castle and The Outrunners defeated Shane Taylor Promotions to win the ROH World Six-Man Tag Team Championship, marking Castle's third reign with the titles. On August 21 at Death Before Dishonor, Castle and the Outrunners lost their titles to The Lethal Twist (Jay Lethal, Blake Christian, and Lee Johnson), ending their reign at 97 days.

=== Total Nonstop Action Wrestling (2015) ===
In 2015, Castle competed two nights for Total Nonstop Action Wrestling (TNA) on their television show Impact Wrestling.

On February 15 (aired May 6) at X-Travaganza 3, he was defeated in an Ultimate X qualifying match by Rockstar Spud.

Also, on February 16 at TNA Gut Check, he defeated DJ Z to qualify for a five-way elimination match later that night, losing in the second match to Tevita Fifita.

== Professional wrestling style and persona ==
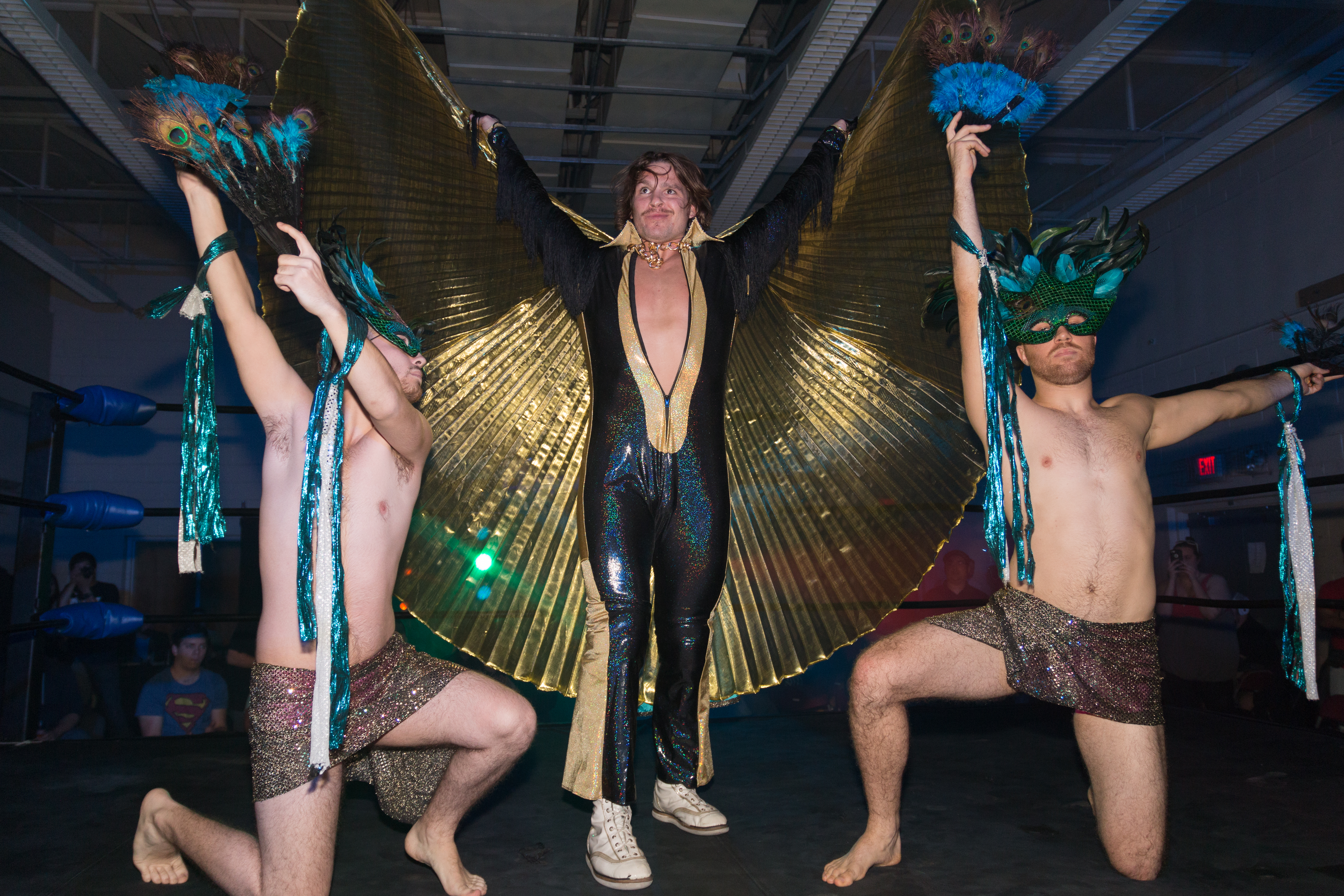
Dalton Castle making his ring entrance, flanked by his "Boys"

Castle's gimmick is that of a flamboyant showman with an androgynous personality, drawing comparisons to Gorgeous George, Adrian Street, Ric Flair, and Goldust. However, unlike those predecessors who have tended to portray villains, Castle typically plays a fan favorite. Castle has also mentioned glam rock stars David Bowie, Freddie Mercury, The Darkness, and Foxy Shazam as inspirations, in addition to Lady Gaga. Befitting the nickname of "The Power Peacock," he combines showmanship and flamboyance with strength and technical soundness, and has displayed an ability to suplex nearly any opponent, including Shane Taylor and Samoa Joe

Castle is frequently accompanied by shirtless, mask-wearing men referred to as his "Boys", who act as Castle's human furniture and fans Castle during his matches. The two most prominent "Boys" were portrayed by the Tate Twins until 2024.

Castle's signature moves include a belly-to-belly suplex, a German suplex, and the "Bang-A-Rang" (a spinning facebuster).

== Championships and accomplishments ==
Castle is a former three-time ROH World Six-Man Tag Team Champion.

- Empire State Wrestling
  - ESW Tag Team Championship (1 time) – with Will Calrissian
- International Wrestling Cartel
  - IWC World Heavyweight Championship (1 time)
- Pro Wrestling Illustrated
  - Ranked No. 15 of the top 500 singles wrestlers in the PWI 500 in 2018
- Ring of Honor
  - ROH World Championship (1 time)
  - ROH World Television Championship (1 time)
  - ROH World Six-Man Tag Team Championship (3 times) – with Boy 1 and Boy 2 (2) and Truth Magnum and Turbo Floyd (1)
  - Soaring Eagle Cup (2017)
