= Michigan State Fairgrounds and Expo Center =

- Interactive map of Michigan State Fairgrounds and Expo Center
- Address: 1120 W. State Fair Avenue
- Location: Detroit, Michigan
- Coordinates: 42°26′36″N 83°7′3″W
- Owner: Michigan State Agricultural Society
- Type: Fairground

Construction
- Opened: 1905
- Closed: 2009
- Demolished: 2022

The Michigan State Fairgrounds and Expo Center was a fairground and exhibition complex located in Detroit, Michigan.

== History ==
In 1904, Joseph L. Hudson, together with three of his associates, organized to acquire a site for the fair. They formed the State Fair Land Company, which acquired 135 acres (0.55 km^{2}) between 7 1/2 and 8 Mile roads, east of Woodward Avenue. Having no interest in running the fair, Hudson sold the land to the Michigan State Agricultural Society for one dollar on April 18, 1905. The Agricultural Society accepted the land and purchased an additional 32 acres (130,000 m^{2}), extending the fairgrounds to 167 acres (0.68 km^{2}). Throughout the following years, additional land was purchased and sold. The present size of the fairgrounds in Detroit is 164 acres (0.66 km^{2}).

From 1905 to 2009, the complex served as a home for the Michigan State Fair. However, several other events were held at the complex including the Detroit Auto Show, Detroit Autorama from 1954 to 1960,, Hallowicked in 2001, Ring of Honor's Showdown in Motown, Dragon Gate Challenge, All Star Extravaganza III, Motor City Madness, and Supercard of Honor II events, and many more. On July 26, 2007, Ring of Honor taped the inaugural New Horizons pay-per-view event at the complex.

By 2009, the Michigan State Fair had declined to 217,000 attendees from its peak in 1996. On October 30, 2009, Governor Jennifer Granholm vetoed legislation to provide funding to the Michigan State Fair, ultimately leading to the closure of the fairgrounds. On April 9, 2012, Governor Rick Snyder signed Senate Bill 515 and House Bill 4803 which would oversee the redevelopment of the State Fairgrounds complex into a proposed commuter rail station. In 2013, Meijer opened their first location in Detroit on redeveloped land on the site of the northern side of the State Fairgrounds. In 2022, the remainder of the State Fairgrounds was demolished as part of a redevelopment plan to construct an Amazon distribution center on the remainder of the site; the bandshell was relocated to nearby Palmer Park. The Dairy Cattle building would be the only building in the complex that remained though it would be converted into the new State Fairgrounds transit center which would later be renamed to the Jason Hargrove Transit Center in honor of a DDOT bus driver named Jason Hargrove who had passed away from COVID-19 complications.
