= The Decade =

Professional wrestling stable

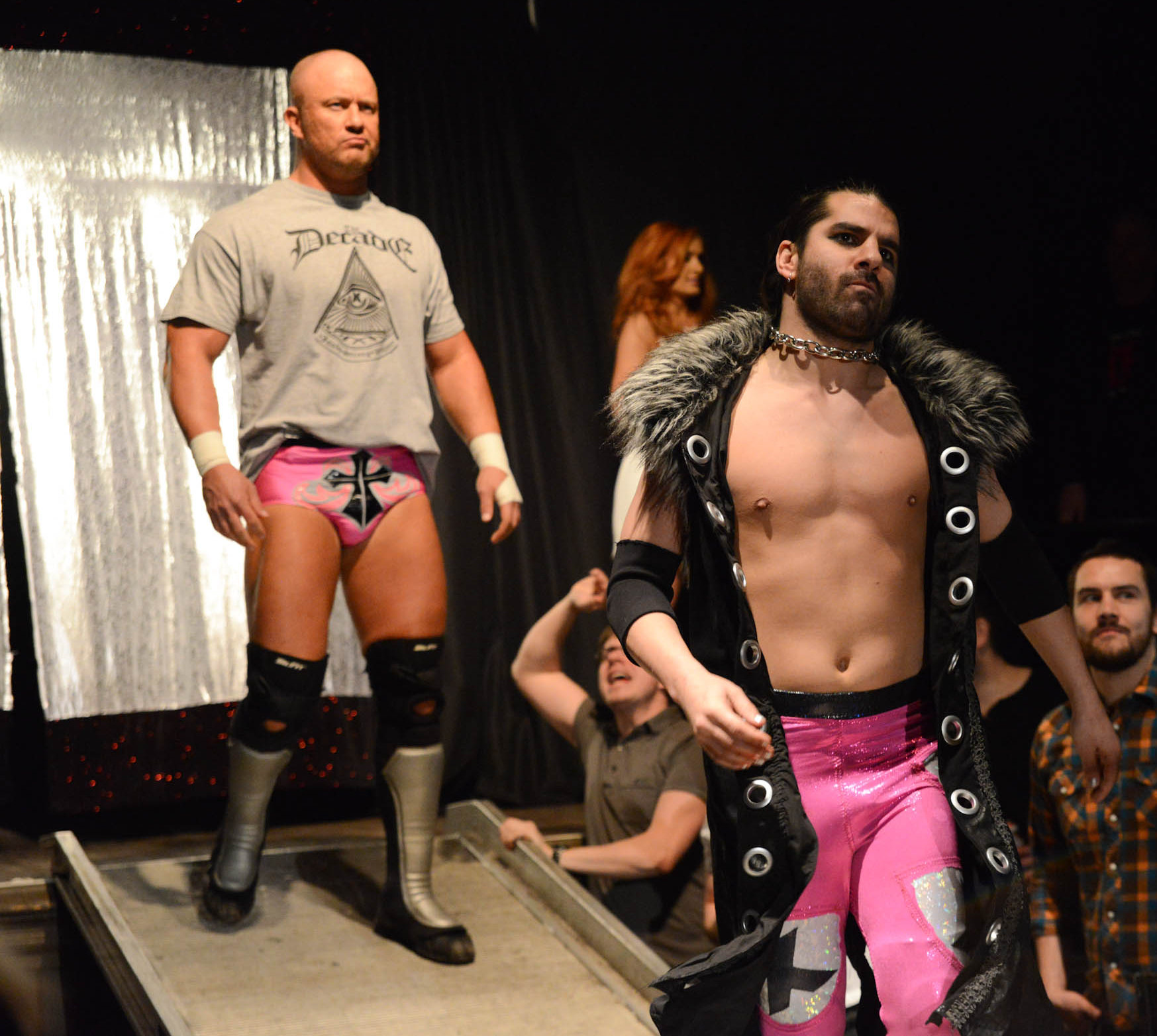
- B. J. Whitmer and Jimmy Jacobs as part of The Decade in March 2014

Stable
- Combined billed weight: 611 lb (277 kg)
- Former members: B. J. Whitmer; Colby Corino; Adam Page; TaDarius Thomas; Roderick Strong; Jimmy Jacobs; Kelly Klein
- Debut: December 14, 2013

The Decade was a villainous professional wrestling stable in Ring of Honor, last consisting of B. J. Whitmer and Colby Corino. The name "Decade" was chosen because all three original members of the stable (Whitmer, Jimmy Jacobs, and Roderick Strong) had been associated with Ring of Honor for ten years when the group was formed, each having debuted in 2003 and remained there since.

== History ==
On December 14, 2013, at Final Battle 2013 Eddie Edwards and B. J. Whitmer defeated Roderick Strong and Jay Lethal in Edwards' farewell match. After the match Whitmer turned on Edwards and attacked him alongside Strong and Jimmy Jacobs. After the match Jacobs cut a promo explaining how he was sick of wrestlers being praised for leaving ROH to jump to bigger wrestling promotions (i.e. TNA or WWE). In a promo the Decade antagonized any wrestler who came back to Ring of Honor after leaving other wrestling companies and younger talents who want to use ROH as a stepping stone to reach bigger wrestling promotions.

On the episode of January 18, the Decade asked Mark Briscoe to join the stable and attacked Adam Page. Briscoe refused and teamed up with Page, leading to a tag team match against Jacobs and Whitmer. The Decade won the match. On March 7, 2014, Adam Page joined The Decade, as the first of the recruits, or "young boys." On April 19 TaDarius Thomas joined The Decade, as the second. At Death Before Dishonor XII Adam Pearce would become a temporary member and beat TaDarius Thomas on Night 1, but lost to Adam Page on Night 2. On September 27, Thomas would quit The Decade after turning on Jacobs. Roderick Strong was ousted from The Decade after falling out with Adam Page, Strong then fended off an attack from Page and Whitmer to set up a match for Final Battle which Page was defeated.

After promoting Page to a full-time member, Whitmer successfully recruited Colby Corino, the 18-year-old son of Whitmer rival Steve Corino to join the Decade. This caused friction between Jacobs and Whitmer, feeling that taking Corino's son was too much, leading to Jacobs leaving the Decade and facing Whitmer at Supercard of Honor IX, with Whitmer coming out on top. This was done to facilitate Jacobs real-life departure from ROH for a writing career with WWE. The group would disband in early 2016, after Whitmer turned on Corino.
