= Kevin Kelly (announcer) =

American sportscaster (born 1967)

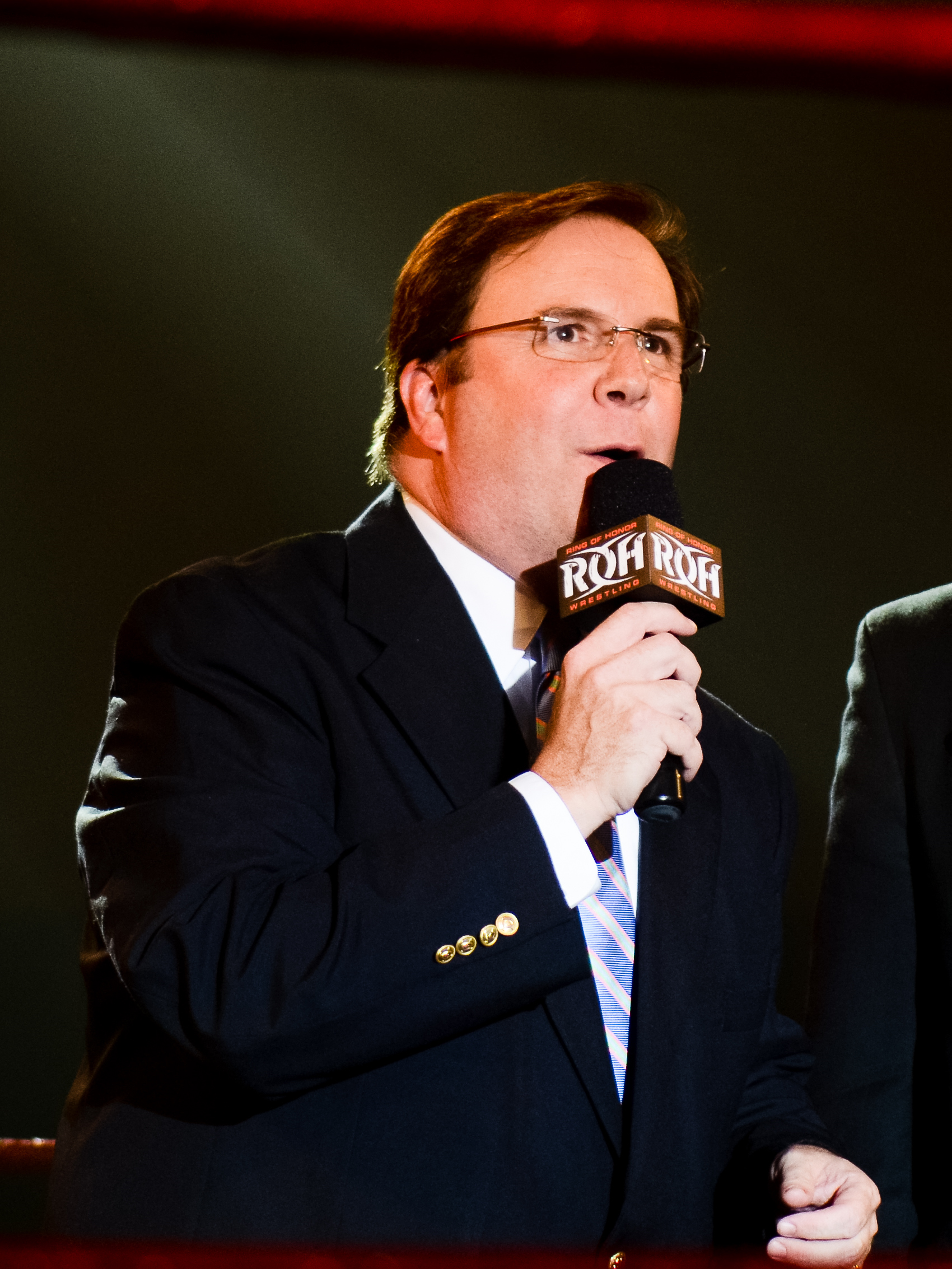
- Kelly at a Ring of Honor show in 2011

Personal information
- Born: Kevin Foote; May 9, 1967 (age 59) New York City, U.S.
- Education: Florida State University
- Children: 2

Professional wrestling career
- Ring name: Kevin Kelly
- Billed height: 5 ft 10 in (1.78 m)
- Billed weight: 240 lb (110 kg)
- Debut: 1991

Kevin Foote (born May 9, 1967) is an American sportscaster, radio host, and professional wrestling color commentator, executive, manager, pundit, and former ring announcer, better known by his ring name Kevin Kelly. He previously worked for WWE from 1996 to 2003, Major League Wrestling in 2004, Ring of Honor (ROH) from 2010 to 2017, New Japan Pro-Wrestling (NJPW) from 2015 to 2023 and All Elite Wrestling (AEW) from 2023 to 2024.

== Early life ==
Kelly was born in New York City, New York, but his family relocated to Stuart, Florida, when he was ten. He graduated from Florida State University in January 1990.

== Broadcasting career ==
=== Radio ===
Kelly first became involved in broadcasting when he began working as a disc jockey, playing music from the 1950s, 1960s and 1970s.

Kelly once hosted a segment named "Plan B" on the Voice of Wrestling Internet radio program. In August 2007, Kelly started his own show on the Wrestling Radio Network called The Kevin Kelly Show. Kelly also hosts The Big Picture audio show on ClubWWI.com. In 2014, Kevin Kelly began hosting a wrestling and pop culture podcast, The Kevin Kelly Show, on Place to Be Nation.

=== Professional wrestling ===
==== Independent circuit (1991–1996, 1999–2005, 2011, 2022–present) ====
Kelly debuted on the professional wrestling independent circuit in 1991. He originally worked as a ring announcer for Eddie Mansfield's Orlando, Florida-based International Wrestling Federation.

In November 1999, Kelly debuted in the Delaware-based East Coast Wrestling Association as a manager, forming several heel stables. On April 7, 2001, in Wilmington, Delaware, Kelly defeated Cheetah Master for the ECWA Heavyweight Championship with the help of Billy Fives and Rick Fuller, members of Kelly's "Alliance of Defiance" stable. He was stripped of the title on May 5, 2001, with Scoot Andrews defeating Billy Fives for the vacant title. On December 3, 2005, Kelly was inducted into the ECWA Hall of Fame.

From 2003 to 2004, he worked for the first incarnation of Major League Wrestling.

From May 28, 2011, to October 22, 2011, Kelly was an announcer for Lucha Libre USA Season 2.

On November 13, 2022, Kevin Kelly announced that he would be starting his own wrestling promotion under the name "American eXcellence Wrestling". The promotion's first event was held on January 7, 2023 at the Hamburg Field House in Hamburg, Pennsylvania.

==== World Wrestling Federation/Entertainment (1996–2003) ====
Kelly received a try-out with the World Wrestling Federation as a ring announcer due to the intervention of fellow IWF alumnus Billy Gunn. He was hired by the WWF in June 1996, and began working as a backstage interviewer. From August to October 1996, Kelly served as commentator for Raw is War, the flagship television program of the WWF, alongside Jim Ross and Jerry Lawler. From December 1997 to March 1998, Kelly again served as a commentator for Raw is War, alongside Jim Ross and Michael Cole. Afterward, Kelly resumed serving as an interviewer on Raw is War and (upon its premiere) SmackDown!.

As an interviewer, Kelly was involved in numerous angles. The most publicized was the controversial "Pillman's got a gun" angle, which took place on the November 4, 1996 episode of Monday Night Raw, which was filmed in Fort Wayne, Indiana. The angle was set against the backdrop of an ongoing feud between Brian Pillman and Stone Cold Steve Austin. Throughout the broadcast of Monday Night Raw, live footage was shown of Kelly interviewing Pillman in his home in Walton, Kentucky alongside Pillman's wife Melanie. After Dok Hendrix informed Monday Night Raw announcer Vince McMahon that Austin was supposedly traveling to Pillman's home, Pillman, upon being apprised of this development, produced and loaded a 9 mm pistol and stated that he would "blow [Austin's] sorry ass straight to hell!" A frightened Kelly delivered the line "Pillman's got a gun!" In the course of the interview, Austin arrived at Pillman's home and, after fighting off several of Pillman's friends who had surrounded the house to protect him, broke into the house and advanced on Pillman. Pillman responded by pointing his pistol at Austin, with the live camera feed subsequently fading to black as Kelly and Melanie Pillman screamed. When the camera feed returned, Pillman was being restrained by his friends, and Kelly informed McMahon that there had been two explosions, but no-one had been injured. At that point, Austin re-entered the house, with Pillman's friends forcing him out again as Pillman pointed his pistol at Austin while screaming obscenities and threats. Kelly shouted for someone to "call the police" as Monday Night Raw color commentator Jerry Lawler instructed him to "get the gun". The broadcast ended with Austin being driven from the house as Melanie Pillman cried. The WWF and Pillman would later apologize for the segment.

In the late 1990s and early 2000s, Kelly would frequently be mocked by The Rock during interviews, with The Rock labeling him an "ugly hermaphrodite" and nicknaming him "Hermie". At Unforgiven on September 24, 2000, Kelly was attacked by the returning Stone Cold Steve Austin while attempting to interview him.

Kelly would later begin hosting the weekly WWF webcast Byte This!. In addition to his on-screen roles, Kelly served as a WWF talent scout, monitoring wrestlers in the Heartland Wrestling Association, Memphis Championship Wrestling, Ohio Valley Wrestling, and Urban Wrestling Alliance developmental territories. Kelly was responsible for watching and evaluating tapes of matches sent to the WWF by prospective employees. Kelly also had a minor degree of influence on the creative direction of the WWF, and was the creator of the storyline that saw Stephanie McMahon marry Triple H, creating the McMahon-Helmsley Faction. In addition, Kelly produced WWE Confidential.

On March 21, 2003, Kelly was released by World Wrestling Entertainment as part of a series of budget cuts. Since his release, Kelly has criticized the corporate policies and creative direction of his former employer.

==== Major League Wrestling (2004) ====
In 2004, Kevin Kelly would replace Joey Styles as the announcer for Major League Wrestling, but the promotion would cease operations shortly thereafter.

==== Ring of Honor (2010–2017) ====
On March 2, 2010, Jim Cornette announced that Kelly had signed an agreement to be the voice of Ring of Honor (ROH) on Internet pay-per-view Between 2011 and 2017, Kelly served as main play-by-play announcer for ROH television tapings and pay-per-views.

On February 2, 2017, it was reported that Kelly had given his notice to ROH and left his position as the company's head play-by-play announcer. Kelly remained with ROH in a part-time role until July 11, when he announced he was no longer working for the company, although he will still call ROH matches held as part of New Japan Pro-Wrestling events as he is associated with the Japanese promotion as their English language play-by-play announcer.

==== New Japan Pro-Wrestling (2015–2023) ====
On October 12, Kelly and Matt Striker served as the English language commentators for New Japan Pro-Wrestling's King of Pro-Wrestling on NJPW World.

Kelly returned to NJPW English commentary at Wrestle Kingdom 10 in Tokyo Dome on January 4, 2016, again working alongside Matt Striker as well as NJPW wrestler Yoshitatsu. He returned as part of NJPW English commentary at Invasion Attack 2016 alongside Steve Corino, who filled in Matt Striker's position. In January 2017, Corino was replaced by Don Callis.

On September 5, 2023, Kelly announced that he would be leaving NJPW in 2024. Kelly would leave the company on November 14 instead, he was replaced by American indendepent wrestling commentator Walker Stewart on English commentary.

==== All Elite Wrestling (2023–2024) ====
Kelly officially joined All Elite Wrestling (AEW) on June 17, 2023, where he debuted as part of the commentary team for the inaugural episode of AEW Collision alongside Nigel McGuinness and Jim Ross. He was fired on March 8, 2024, after taking to social media the week before and accusing ROH and fellow AEW announcer Ian Riccaboni of libel and attempted career sabotage. Kelly later appeared on Eric Bischoff's podcast show on June 15, discussing his termination, and plans to sue AEW. On September 5, it was reported that Kelly (and The Tate Twins) had filed a lawsuit against AEW and AEW's owner and CEO Tony Khan to void the arbitration clause of their AEW talent contracts and to certify a class-action lawsuit that AEW misclassifying wrestlers as independent contractors instead of employees. Kelly has also filed a lawsuit for monetary damages from AEW and Riccaboni for breach of contract, defamation and causing him to being unable to find work. In June 2025, the lawsuit was sent to arbitration by presiding judge Harvey E. Schlesinger.

== Championships and accomplishments ==
- East Coast Wrestling Association
  - ECWA Hall of Fame (Class of 2005)
  - ECWA Heavyweight Championship (1 time)
- Wrestling Observer Newsletter
  - Best Television Announcer (2018, 2019, 2022)
  - Best Announcer of the Decade (2010s)
