= 2014 in professional wrestling =

2014 in professional wrestling describes the year's events in the world of professional wrestling.

== List of notable promotions ==
These promotions held notable events in 2014.

Promotion Name	Abbreviation	Notes
Consejo Mundial de Lucha Libre	CMLL	
Lucha Libre AAA Worldwide	AAA	The "AAA" abbreviation has been used since the mid-1990s and had previously stood for the promotion's original name Asistencia Asesoría y Administración.
New Japan Pro-Wrestling	NJPW	
Pro Wrestling Guerrilla	PWG	
Ring of Honor	ROH	
Total Nonstop Action Wrestling	TNA	
World Wrestling Council	WWC	
Wrestle-1	—	
WWE	—	WWE stands for World Wrestling Entertainment, which is still the legal name, but the company ceased using the full name in April 2011, with the WWE abbreviation becoming an orphaned initialism. NXT served as WWE's developmental territory.

== Calendar of notable shows ==
=== January ===
Date	Promotion(s)	Event	Location	Main Event
4	NJPW	Wrestle Kingdom 8	Tokyo	Hiroshi Tanahashi defeated Shinsuke Nakamura (c) in a Singles match to win the IWGP Intercontinental Championship
6	WWC	Euphoria	Bayamon, Puerto Rico	Apolo defeat Gilbert
26	WWE	Royal Rumble	Pittsburgh	Batista won the 30-man Royal Rumble match by last eliminating Roman Reigns to earn a WWE World Heavyweight Championship match at WrestleMania XXX
(c) – denotes defending champion(s)

=== February ===
Date	Promotion(s)	Event	Location	Main Event	Notes
2	TNA	One Night Only: Joker's Wild 2	London, England	12-man Joker's Wild gauntlet battle royal	
9	NJPW	The New Beginning in Hiroshima	Hiroshima	Hiroshi Tanahashi (c) defeated Shinsuke Nakamura in a Singles match to retain the IWGP Intercontinental Championship	
11	NJPW	The New Beginning in Osaka	Osaka	Kazuchika Okada (c) defeated Hirooki Goto in a Singles match to retain the IWGP Heavyweight Championship	
21	ROH	ROH 12th Anniversary Show	Philadelphia	Kevin Steen defeated Cliff Compton in an Unsanctioned Philadelphia Street Fight	
23	WWE	Elimination Chamber	Minneapolis	Randy Orton (c) defeated Daniel Bryan, John Cena, Cesaro, Christian, and Sheamus in an Elimination Chamber match to retain the WWE World Heavyweight Championship	
27	WWE: NXT	Arrival	Winter Park	Adrian Neville defeated Bo Dallas (c) in a Ladder match to win the NXT Championship	WWE's first NXT-branded event and their first event streamed live on the WWE Network.
(c) – denotes defending champion(s)

=== March ===
Date	Promotion(s)	Event	Location	Main Event
2	TNA; Wrestle-1	One Night Only: Global Impact Japan	Tokyo, Japan	Kai vs. Magnus (c) for the TNA World Heavyweight Championship
9	TNA	Lockdown	Miami	Team MVP (MVP, The Wolves (Davey Richards and Eddie Edwards) and Willow) defeated Team Dixie (Bobby Roode, Austin Aries and The BroMans (Robbie E and Jessie Godderz)) in a Lethal Lockdown match with Bully Ray as special guest referee. The leader of the winning team received complete control of Wrestling Operations. Had Team Dixie won, Roode would have gained 10% ownership of TNA.
16	AAA	Rey de Reyes	Monterrey, Mexico	Four-way elimination Rey de Reyes tournament final match
23	NJPW	New Japan Cup Final	Hyogo	Shinsuke Nakamura defeated Bad Luck Fale in the tournament final to win the 2014 New Japan Cup
28	PWG	PWG Mystery Vortex II	Reseda, California	Adam Cole (c) defeated Candice LeRae in a singles match for the PWG World Championship
(c) – denotes defending champion(s)

=== April ===
Date	Promotion(s)	Event	Location	Main Event
4	ROH	Supercard of Honor VIII	Westwego	Adam Cole (c) defeated Jay Briscoe in the Ladder War V to retain the ROH World Championship
6	NJPW	Invasion Attack	Tokyo	Shinsuke Nakamura defeated Hiroshi Tanahashi (c) in a Singles match to win the IWGP Intercontinental Championship
6	WWE	WrestleMania XXX	New Orleans	Daniel Bryan defeated Batista and Randy Orton (c) in a Triple threat match to win the WWE World Heavyweight Championship. Bryan made Batista submit.
12	TNA	One Night Only: World Cup	Tokyo, Japan	Five-on-Five Elimination Tag Team match
12	TNA	One Night Only: X-Travaganza	Orlando, Florida	Five-on-Five Elimination Tag Team match
27	CMLL	58. Aniversario de Arena México	Mexico City, Mexico	Los Revolucionarios del Terror (Dragón Rojo Jr., Pólvora and Rey Escorpión) defeated Atlantis, La Sombra and Místico
27	TNA	Sacrifice	Orlando	Eric Young (c) defeated Magnus in a Singles match to retain the TNA World Heavyweight Championship
(c) – denotes defending champion(s)

=== May ===
Date	Promotion(s)	Event	Location	Main Event
3	NJPW	Wrestling Dontaku	Fukuoka	A.J. Styles defeated Kazuchika Okada (c) in a Singles match to win the IWGP Heavyweight Championship
4	WWE	Extreme Rules	East Rutherford	Daniel Bryan (c) defeated Kane in an Extreme Rules match to retain the WWE World Heavyweight Championship
10	ROH; NJPW	Global Wars	Toronto	Adam Cole (c) defeated Kevin Steen in a Singles match to retain the ROH World Championship
10	TNA	One Night Only: Knockouts Knockdown	Orlando, Florida	Knockouts Gauntlet match to crown the "Queen of the Knockouts"
10	TNA	One Night Only: Victory Road	Orlando, Florida	12-man Gauntlet battle royal match for a future shot at the TNA World Heavyweight Championship
17	ROH; NJPW	War of the Worlds	New York City	A.J. Styles (c) defeated Kazuchika Okada, and Michael Elgin in a Three-way match to retain the IWGP Heavyweight Championship
25	NJPW	Back to the Yokohama Arena	Yokohama	A.J. Styles (c) defeated Kazuchika Okada in a Singles match to retain the IWGP Heavyweight Championship
29	WWE: NXT	TakeOver	Winter Park	Adrian Neville (c) defeated Tyson Kidd in a Singles match to retain the NXT Championship
(c) – denotes defending champion(s)

=== June ===
Date	Promotion(s)	Event	Location	Main Event
1	WWE	Payback	Rosemont	The Shield (Roman Reigns, Seth Rollins, and Dean Ambrose) defeated Evolution (Triple H, Randy Orton, and Batista) in a No Holds Barred Elimination match
8	NJPW	Best of the Super Juniors	Tokyo	Ricochet defeated Kushida in final match in Best Of The Super Junior 2014.
15	TNA	Slammiversary	Arlington	Eric Young (c) defeated Lashley and Austin Aries in a Three-way Steel Cage match to retain the TNA World Heavyweight Championship
21	NJPW	Dominion	Osaka	Bad Luck Fale defeated Shinsuke Nakamura (c) in a Singles match to win the IWGP Intercontinental Championship
22	ROH	Best in the World	Nashville	Michael Elgin defeated Adam Cole (c) in a Singles match to win the ROH World Championship
29	WWE	Money in the Bank	Boston	John Cena defeated Kane, Randy Orton, Roman Reigns, Alberto Del Rio, Sheamus, Bray Wyatt, and Cesaro in a Ladder match for the vacant WWE World Heavyweight Championship
(c) – denotes defending champion(s)

=== July ===
Date	Promotion(s)	Event	Location	Main Event
20	WWE	Battleground	Tampa	John Cena (c) defeated Kane, Randy Orton, and Roman Reigns in a Fatal 4-Way match to retain the WWE World Heavyweight Championship
(c) – denotes defending champion(s)

=== August ===
Date	Promotion(s)	Event	Location	Main Event
1	CMLL	Juicio Final	Mexico City	Rush defeated Negro Casas in a Best two-out-of-three falls Lucha de Apuestas, Hair vs. Hair match
9	AAA	Triplemanía XXII	Mexico City	El Hijo del Perro Aguayo defeated Cibernético, Dr. Wagner Jr. and Myzteziz in a Four-way elimination match for Copa Triplemanía XXII
10	NJPW	G1 Climax Final	Saitama	Kazuchika Okada defeats Shinsuke Nakamura in the final of the 2014 G1 Climax
17	AAA	Triplemanía XXII	Mexico City, Mexico	El Hijo del Perro Aguayo defeated Cibernético, Dr. Wagner Jr. and Myzteziz
17	WWE	SummerSlam	Los Angeles	Brock Lesnar defeated John Cena (c) in a Singles match to win the WWE World Heavyweight Championship
29-31	PWG	Battle of Los Angeles	Reseda, California	Ricochet defeated Johnny Gargano and Roderick Strong via pinfall to win the 2014 Battle of Los Angeles tournament
(c) – denotes defending champion(s)

=== September ===
Date	Promotion(s)	Event	Location	Main Event
5	TNA	One Night Only: Turning Point	Charlottesville, Virginia	Jeff Hardy defeated MVP
6	TNA	One Night Only: Rivals	Roanoke Rapids, North Carolina	Jeff Hardy defeated Magnus
6	ROH	All Star Extravaganza	Toronto	reDRagon (Bobby Fish and Kyle O'Reilly) (c) defeated The Young Bucks (Matt Jackson and Nick Jackson) 2-1 in a 2-out-of-3 falls match to retain the ROH World Tag Team Championship
11	WWE: NXT	TakeOver: Fatal 4-Way	Winter Park	Adrian Neville (c) defeated Sami Zayn, Tyler Breeze, and Tyson Kidd in a Fatal 4-Way match to retain the NXT Championship
19	CMLL	CMLL 81st Anniversary Show	Mexico City, Mexico	Atlantis defeated Último Guerrero in a Best two-out-of-three falls Lucha de Apuestas mask vs. mask match
21	WWE	Night of Champions	Nashville	John Cena defeated Brock Lesnar (c) by disqualification in a Singles match for the WWE World Heavyweight Championship
21	NJPW	Destruction in Kobe	Kobe	Shinsuke Nakamura defeated Bad Luck Fale (c) in a Singles match to win the IWGP Intercontinental Championship
23	NJPW	Destruction in Okayama	Okayama	Kazuchika Okada defeated Karl Anderson in a Singles match for the Tokyo Dome IWGP Heavyweight Championship challenge rights certificate
(c) – denotes defending champion(s)

=== October ===
Date	Promotion(s)	Event	Location	Main Event
12	AAA	Heroes Inmortales	San Luis Potosí, San Luis Potosí, Mexico	El Hijo del Perro Aguayo and El Texano, Jr. defeated El Mesías and El Patrón Alberto
12	TNA; Wrestle-1	Bound for Glory	Tokyo	The Great Muta and Tajiri defeated The Revolution (James Storm and The Great Sanada) in a Tag team match
13	NJPW	King of Pro-Wrestling	Tokyo	Hiroshi Tanahashi defeated A.J. Styles (c) in a Singles match to win IWGP Heavyweight Championship
25	WWC	41st WWC Aniversario	Caguas, Puerto Rico	Invader #1 Vs. El Bronco finished in a double disqualification
26	WWE	Hell in a Cell	Dallas	Seth Rollins defeated Dean Ambrose in a Hell in a Cell match
(c) – denotes defending champion(s)

=== November ===
Date	Promotion(s)	Event	Location	Main Event
8	NJPW	Power Struggle	Osaka	Shinsuke Nakamura (c) defeated Katsuyori Shibata in a Singles match to retain the IWGP Intercontinental Championship
23	WWE	Survivor Series	St. Louis	Team Cena (John Cena, Dolph Ziggler, Big Show, Erick Rowan, and Ryback) defeated Team Authority (Seth Rollins, Kane, Mark Henry, Rusev, and Luke Harper) in a 5-on-5 Survivor Series elimination match Since Team Authority lost, they were removed from power. Had Team Cena lost, Cena's teammates (with the exception of Cena himself) would have been fired.
(c) – denotes defending champion(s)

=== December ===
Date	Promotion(s)	Event	Location	Main Event
5	CMLL	Infierno en el Ring	Mexico City	10-man steel cage elimination match contested under Lucha de Apuestas, hair vs. hair match
7	AAA	Guerra de Titanes	Zapopan, Jalisco, Mexico	El Patrón Alberto defeated El Texano Jr. (c) in a Singles match for the AAA Mega Championship
7	NJPW	World Tag League Final	Nagoya	Hirooki Goto & Katsuyori Shibata defeat Bullet Club (Doc Gallows & Karl Anderson) in the final of the 2014 World Tag League tournament.
7	ROH	Final Battle	New York City	Jay Briscoe (c) defeated Adam Cole in a Fight Without Honor to retain the ROH World Championship
9	WWE	Tribute to the Troops	Columbus, Georgia	John Cena, Dolph Ziggler, Erick Rowan and Ryback defeated Luke Harper and The Authority (Seth Rollins, Big Show & Kane)
11	WWE: NXT	TakeOver: R Evolution	Winter Park	Sami Zayn defeated Adrian Neville (c) in a Title vs. Career match to win the NXT Championship; Had Sami Zayn lost, he would have been forced to retire.
14	WWE	TLC: Tables, Ladders & Chairs	Cleveland	Bray Wyatt defeated Dean Ambrose in a Tables, Ladders, and Chairs match
(c) – denotes defending champion(s)

== Notable events ==
- January 27 – CM Punk walked out of that night's WWE Raw taping, ending his run with the company.
- February 24 – WWE launched the WWE Network in the United States, an over-the-top streaming service and digital television network, hosting thousands of hours of in-ring shows and all pay-per-views (PPV) from WWE and various promotions they have acquired over the years, such as Extreme Championship Wrestling and World Championship Wrestling, as well as airing current WWE PPVs, NXT events, and other original productions. It had a staggered launch throughout the rest of the world.
- December 1 – New Japan Pro-Wrestling (NJPW) launched NJPW World, a worldwide streaming site for the promotion's events, including airing current events live as well as hosting events from the promotion's archives, dating back to 1972.

== Accomplishments and tournaments ==
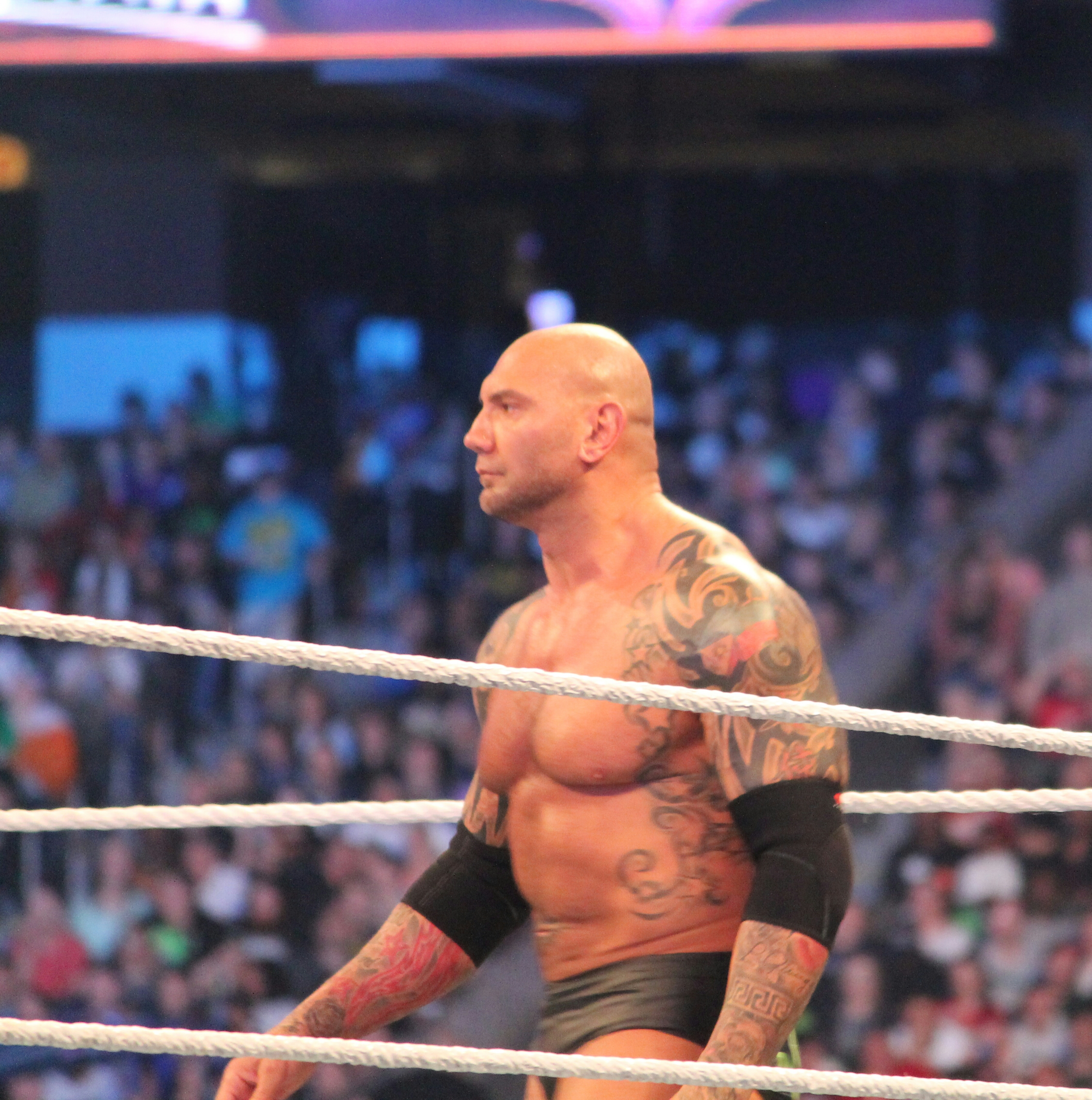
Batista, the winner of the 2014 Royal Rumble

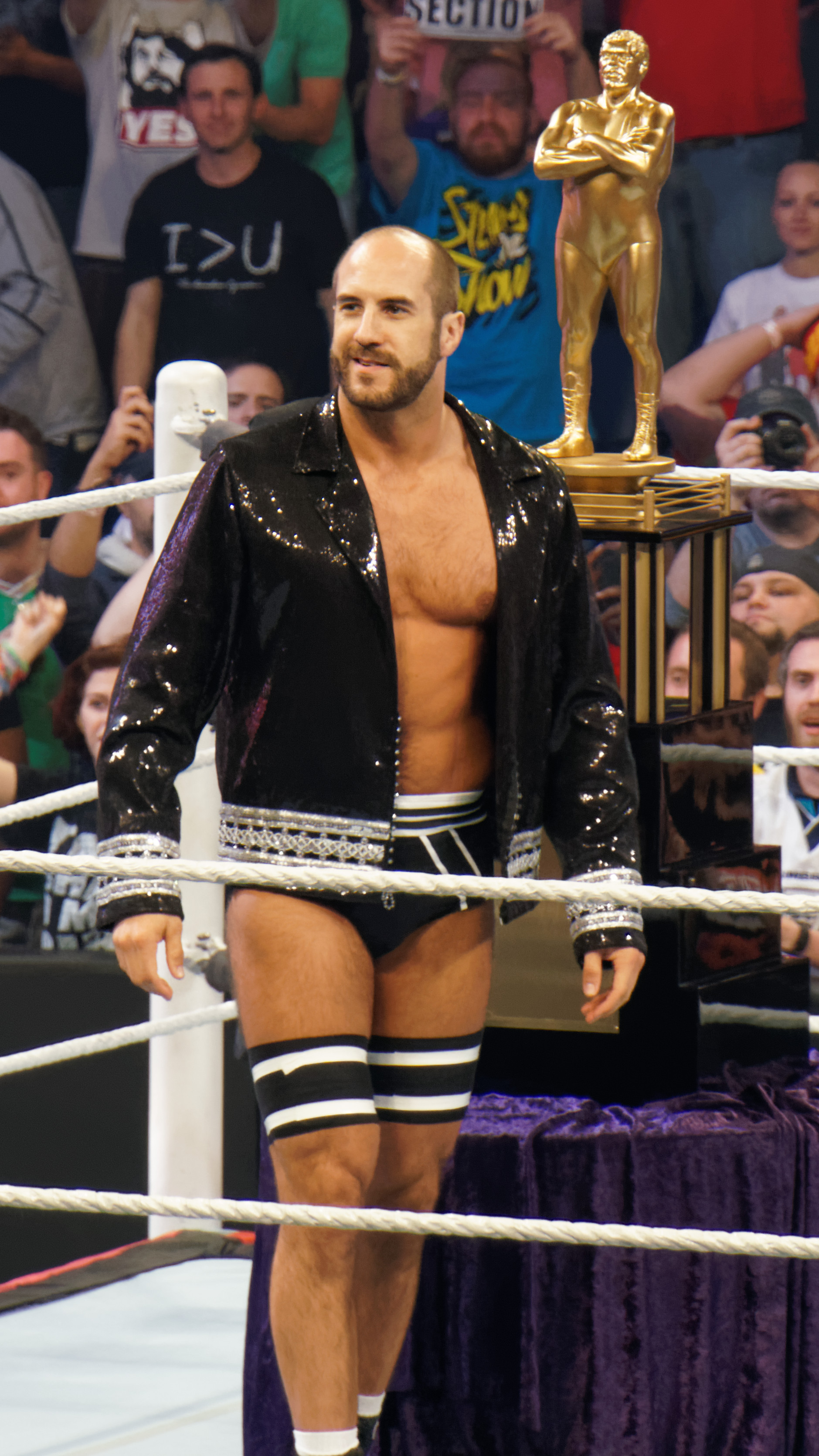
Cesaro, the winner of the inaugural André the Giant Memorial Battle Royal at WrestleMania XXX

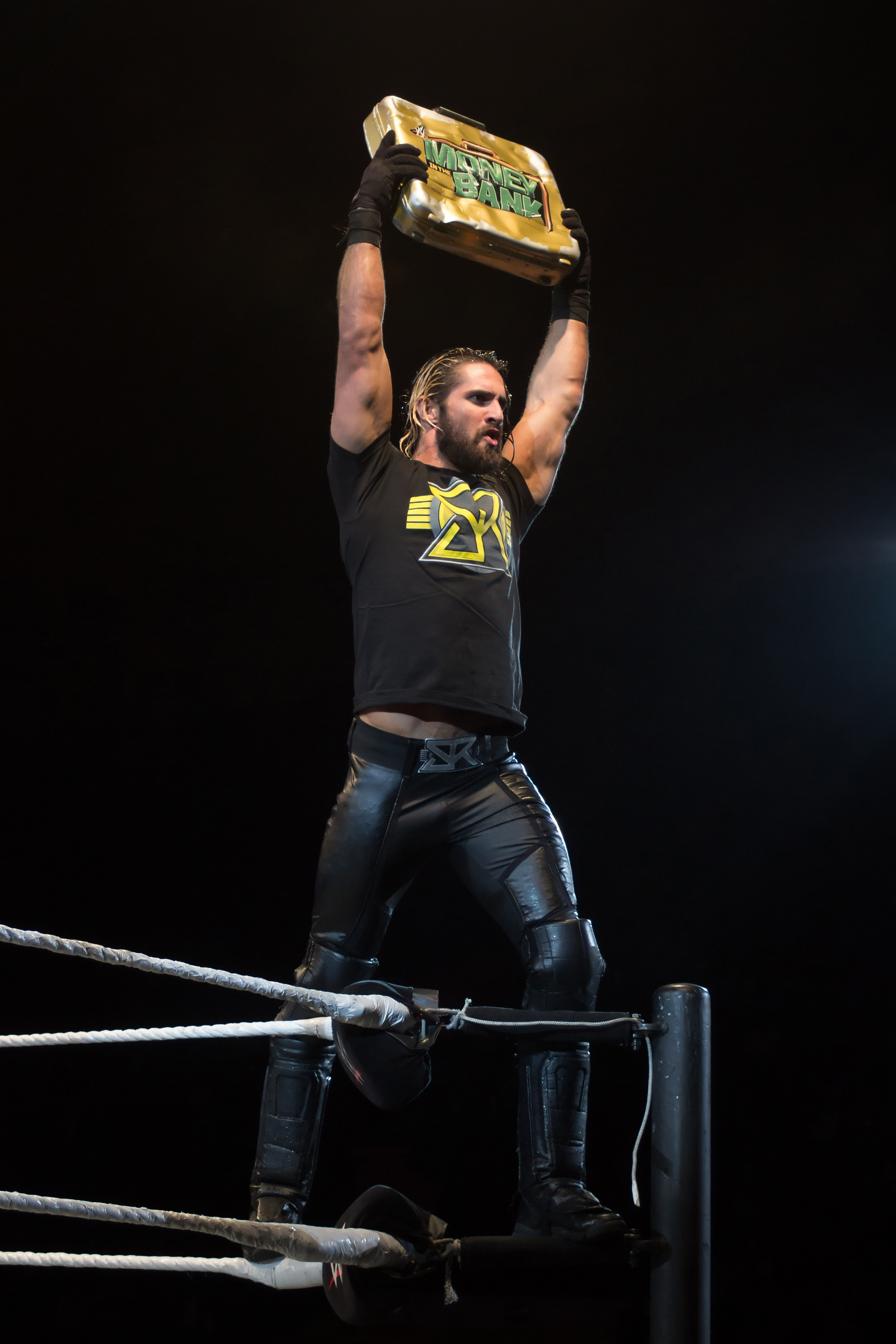
Seth Rollins, holding the 2014 Money in the Bank briefcase

=== AAA ===
Accomplishment	Winner	Date won	Notes
Rey de Reyes	La Parka	March 16	
Copa Triplemanía	El Hijo del Perro Aguayo	August 17	Defeated Cibernético, Dr. Wagner Jr. and Myzteziz to win.
Copa Antonio Peña	Myzteziz	October 12	Defeated La Parka, Blue Demon, Jr., Australian Suicide, El Zorro, Pentagón, Jr., Fénix, and Daga to win.

=== JWP ===
Accomplishment	Winner	Date won	Notes
Tag League the Best 2014	Rabbit Miu and Tsukushi Haruka	March 16	

=== Total Nonstop Action Wrestling ===
Accomplishment	Winner	Date won	Notes
Joker's Wild	Ethan Carter III	February 2	
World Cup	Team Young (Eric Young, Bully Ray, Eddie Edwards, Gunner, ODB)	April 12	
Knockouts Knockdown	Madison Rayne	May 10	
TNA X Division Championship Tournament	Samoa Joe	August 7	
Gold Rush Tournament	Austin Aries	September 24	
TNA World Tag Team Championship #1 Contender Tournament	The Hardys (Matt and Jeff Hardy)	October 15	
British Boot Camp season 2	Mark Andrews	December 7	

=== WWE ===
Accomplishment	Winner	Date won	Notes
Royal Rumble	Batista	January 26	Last eliminated Roman Reigns to win a WWE World Heavyweight Championship match at WrestleMania XXX, but was unsuccessful in the triple threat match against champion Randy Orton and Daniel Bryan, who won.
André the Giant Memorial Battle Royal	Cesaro	April 6	Last eliminated Big Show in the inaugural match to win the André the Giant Memorial Trophy.
WWE Intercontinental Championship #1 Contender's Tournament	Bad News Barrett	April 28	Defeated Rob Van Dam in the tournament final to win an Intercontinental Championship match at Extreme Rules, where Barrett defeated Big E to win the title.
Money in the Bank ladder match	Seth Rollins	June 29	Defeated Kofi Kingston, Dolph Ziggler, Dean Ambrose, Rob Van Dam, and Jack Swagger to win a WWE World Heavyweight Championship match contract, which he cashed in at WrestleMania 31 the following year to win the title; during the main event match in which Brock Lesnar defended the title against Roman Reigns, Rollins cashed in during the match, converting the singles match into a triple threat match in which Rollins pinned Reigns to win Lesnar's title.
NXT Women's Championship Tournament	Charlotte	May 29	Defeated Natalya in the tournament final to win the vacant NXT Women's Championship; previous champion Paige was stripped of the title after she had won the WWE Divas Championship and was promoted to the main roster.
NXT Tag Team Championship #1 Contender's Tournament	The Lucha Dragons (Kalisto and Sin Cara)	July 31	Defeated The Vaudevillains (Aiden English and Simon Gotch) in the tournament final to win an NXT Tag Team Championship match at TakeOver: Fatal 4-Way, where The Lucha Dragons defeated The Ascension (Konnor and Viktor) to win the title.

== Title changes ==
=== AAA ===
AAA Mega Championship
Incoming champion – El Texano, Jr.
Date	Winner	Event/Show	Note(s)
December 7	El Patron Alberto	Guerra de Titanes	

AAA Fusion Championship
Incoming champion – Fenix
Date	Winner	Event/Show	Note(s)
August 17	El Hijo del Fantasma	Triplemanía XXII	
August 17	Retired	Triplemanía XXII	After El Hijo del Fantasma defeated Fenix to unify the AAA Fusion Championship with the AAA Cruiserweight Championship, the AAA Fusion Championship was retired and the AAA Cruiserweight Championship became the AAA World Cruiserweight Championship.

AAA Latin American Championship
Incoming champion – Blue Demon Jr.
Date	Winner	Event/Show	Note(s)
March 16	Vacated	Rey de Reyes	
March 16	Chessman	Rey de Reyes	

AAA World Mini-Estrella Championship
Incoming champion – Dinastía
No title changes

AAA World Cruiserweight Championship
Incoming champion – Daga
Date	Winner	Event/Show	Note(s)
August 17	El Hijo del Fantasma	Triplemanía XXII	

AAA Reina de Reinas Championship
Incoming champion – Faby Apache
Date	Winner	Event/Show	Note(s)
August 17	Taya	Triplemanía XXII	

AAA World Tag Team Championship
Incoming champions – Los Güeros del Cielo (Angélico and Jack Evans (2))
Date	Winner	Event/Show	Note(s)
December 7	Los Perros del Mal (Joe Líder and Pentagón Jr.)	Guerra de Titanes	

AAA World Mixed Tag Team Championship
Incoming champions – Drago and Faby Apache
Date	Winner	Event/Show	Note(s)
April 19	La Sociedad (Pentagón Jr. and Sexy Star)	AAA Television Taping	

AAA World Trios Championship
Incoming champions – Los Psycho Circus (Monster Clown, Murder Clown and Psycho Clown)
No title changes

=== NJPW ===
IWGP Heavyweight Championship
Incoming champion – Kazuchika Okada
Date	Winner	Event/Show	Note(s)
May 3	A.J. Styles	Wrestling Dontaku	
October 13	Hiroshi Tanahashi	King of Pro-Wrestling	

IWGP Intercontinental Championship
Incoming champion – Shinsuke Nakamura
Date	Winner	Event/Show	Note(s)
January 4	Hiroshi Tanahashi	Wrestle Kingdom 8	
April 6	Shinsuke Nakamura	Invasion Attack	
June 21	Bad Luck Fale	Dominion 6.21	
September 21	Shinsuke Nakamura	Destruction in Kobe	

IWGP Tag Team Championship
Incoming champions – K.E.S. (Davey Boy Smith Jr. and Lance Archer)
Date	Winner	Event/Show	Note(s)
January 4	Bullet Club (Doc Gallows and Karl Anderson)	Wrestle Kingdom 8	

IWGP Junior Heavyweight Championship
Incoming champion – Prince Devitt
Date	Winner	Event/Show	Note(s)
January 4	Kota Ibushi	Wrestle Kingdom 8	
July 4	Kushida	Kizuna Road	
September 21	Ryusuke Taguchi	Destruction in Kobe	

IWGP Junior Heavyweight Tag Team Championship
Incoming champions – The Young Bucks (Matt Jackson and Nick Jackson)
Date	Winner	Event/Show	Note(s)
June 21	Time Splitters (Alex Shelley and Kushida)	Dominion 6.21	
November 8	reDRagon (Bobby Fish and Kyle O'Reilly)	Power Struggle	

NEVER Openweight Championship
Incoming champion – Tetsuya Naito
Date	Winner	Event/Show	Note(s)
February 11	Tomohiro Ishii	The New Beginning in Osaka	
June 29	Yujiro Takahashi	Kizuna Road	
October 13	Tomohiro Ishii	King of Pro-Wrestling	

=== ROH ===
ROH World Championship
Incoming champion – Adam Cole
Date	Winner	Event/Show	Note(s)
June 22	Michael Elgin	Best in the World	
September 6	Jay Briscoe	All Star Extravaganza 6	

ROH World Television Championship
Incoming champion – Tommaso Ciampa
Date	Winner	Event/Show	Note(s)
April 4	Jay Lethal	Supercard of Honor VIII	

ROH World Tag Team Championship
Incoming champion(s) – reDRagon (Bobby Fish and Kyle O'Reilly)
Date	Winner	Event/Show	Note(s)
March 8	The Young Bucks (Matt and Nick Jackson)	Raising the Bar: Night 2	
May 17	reDRagon (Bobby Fish and Kyle O'Reilly)	War of the Worlds	

=== The Crash Lucha Libre ===
The Crash Cruiserweight Championship
Incoming champion – Fénix
Date	Winner	Event/Show	Note(s)
February 1	Ángel Metálico	The Crash show	This was a four-way Ladder match, also involving Daga and Star Boy.

=== TNA ===
TNA World Heavyweight Championship
Incoming champion – Magnus
Date	Winner	Event/Show	Note(s)
April 10	Eric Young	Impact Wrestling	If Magnus had been counted out or disqualified, he would have lost the title. If anyone had interfered in the match, they would have been fired
June 19	Lashley	Impact Wrestling	If anyone besides MVP or Kenny King had interfered, they would have been fired
September 18 (aired October 29)	Bobby Roode	Impact Wrestling	Kurt Angle was the special guest referee

TNA X Division Championship
Incoming champion – Chris Sabin
Date	Winner	Event/Show	Note(s)
January 16	Austin Aries	Genesis	
March 2	Sanada	Kaisen: Outbreak	
June 20	Austin Aries	Impact Wrestling	
June 24	Vacated	Impact Wrestling	
June 26	Samoa Joe	Impact Wrestling	
September 19	Vacated	Impact Wrestling	
September 19	Low Ki	Impact Wrestling	

TNA World Tag Team Championship
Incoming champions – The BroMans (Robbie E and Jessie Godderz)
Date	Winner	Event/Show	Note(s)
February 23	The Wolves (Davey Richards and Eddie Edwards)	Impact Wrestling	
March 2	The BroMans (Robbie E and Jessie Godderz)	Kaisen: Outbreak	
April 27	The Wolves (Davey Richards and Eddie Edwards)	Sacrifice	
September 19	The Revolution (Abyss and James Storm)	Impact Wrestling	

TNA Knockouts Championship
Incoming champion – Gail Kim
Date	Winner	Event/Show	Note(s)
January 16	Madison Rayne	Impact Wrestling	
April 27	Angelina Love	Sacrifice	
June 20	Gail Kim	No Surrender	
September 16	Havok	Impact Wrestling	
September 19	Taryn Terrell	Impact Wrestling	

TNA Television Championship
Incoming champion – Abyss
Date	Winner	Event/Show	Note(s)
July 3	Deactivated	N/A	

=== WWE ===
WWE World Heavyweight Championship
Incoming champion – Randy Orton
Date	Winner	Event/Show	Note(s)
April 6	Daniel Bryan	WrestleMania XXX	Triple threat match, also involving Batista, who Bryan made submit to win.
June 9	Vacated	Monday Night Raw	Daniel Bryan was stripped of the title due to a neck injury.
June 29	John Cena	Money in the Bank	Eight-way ladder match for the vacant title, also involving Alberto Del Rio, Bray Wyatt, Cesaro, Kane, Randy Orton, Roman Reigns, and Sheamus.
August 17	Brock Lesnar	SummerSlam	

WWE Intercontinental Championship
Incoming champion – Big E Langston
Date	Winner	Event/Show	Note(s)
May 4	Bad News Barrett	Extreme Rules	
June 30	Vacated	Monday Night Raw	Vacated due to shoulder injury.
July 20	The Miz	Battleground	19-man battle royal. The Miz lastly eliminated Dolph Ziggler to win the vacant title.
August 17	Dolph Ziggler	SummerSlam	
September 21	The Miz	Night of Champions	
September 22	Dolph Ziggler	Monday Night Raw	
November 17	Luke Harper	Monday Night Raw	
December 14	Dolph Ziggler	TLC: Tables, Ladders & Chairs	Ladder match

WWE United States Championship
Incoming champion – Dean Ambrose
Date	Winner	Event/Show	Note(s)
May 5	Sheamus	Monday Night Raw	20-man battle royal. Sheamus lastly eliminated Dean Ambrose to win.
November 3	Rusev	Raw Backstage Pass	

WWE Divas Championship
Incoming champion – AJ Lee
Date	Winner	Event/Show	Note(s)
April 7	Paige	Monday Night Raw	
June 30	AJ Lee	Monday Night Raw	
August 17	Paige	SummerSlam	
September 21	AJ Lee	Night of Champions	Triple threat match, also involving Nikki Bella.
November 23	Nikki Bella	Survivor Series	

WWE Tag Team Championship
Incoming champions – Cody Rhodes and Goldust
Date	Winner	Event/Show	Note(s)
January 26	The New Age Outlaws (Road Dogg and Billy Gunn)	Royal Rumble; Kickoff	
March 3	The Usos (Jey and Jimmy Uso)	Monday Night Raw	
September 21	Gold and Stardust (Goldust and Stardust)	Night of Champions	Gold and Stardust were formerly known as Cody Rhodes and Goldust.
November 23	The Miz and Damien Mizdow	Survivor Series	Fatal four-way tag team match, also involving Los Matadores and The Usos.
December 29	The Usos (Jey and Jimmy Uso)	Monday Night Raw	

==== NXT ====
NXT Championship
Incoming champion – Bo Dallas
Date	Winner	Event/Show	Note(s)
February 27	Adrian Neville	Arrival	Ladder match
December 11	Sami Zayn	TakeOver: R Evolution	Title vs. career match. Had Zayn lost, he would have voluntarily quit NXT.

NXT Women's Championship
Incoming champion – Paige
Date	Winner	Event/Show	Note(s)
April 24	Vacated	NXT	NXT General Manager John "Bradshaw" Layfield stripped Paige of the title after she won the Divas Championship and was promoted to the main roster.
May 29	Charlotte	TakeOver	Defeated Natalya in a tournament final for the vacant title.

NXT Tag Team Championship
Incoming champions – The Ascension (Konnor and Viktor)
Date	Winner	Event/Show	Note(s)
September 11	The Lucha Dragons (Kalisto and Sin Cara)	TakeOver: Fatal 4-Way	

== Awards and honors ==
=== AAA Hall of Fame ===
Inductee
El Brazo
Rayo de Jalisco Sr.

=== Pro Wrestling Illustrated ===
Category	Winner
Wrestler of the Year	Brock Lesnar
Tag Team of the Year	The Usos (Jimmy and Jey Uso)
Match of the Year	John Cena vs. Bray Wyatt (Payback)
Feud of the Year	Seth Rollins vs. Dean Ambrose
Most Popular Wrestler of the Year	Dean Ambrose
Most Hated Wrestler of the Year	Triple H and Stephanie McMahon
Comeback of the Year	Sting
Most Improved Wrestler of the Year	Rusev
Inspirational Wrestler of the Year	Daniel Bryan
Rookie of the Year	Charlotte
Woman of the Year	AJ Lee
Stanley Weston Award (Lifetime Achievement)	Dory Funk Jr.

=== TNA Hall of Fame ===
Inductee
Team 3D

=== Wrestling Observer Newsletter ===
==== Wrestling Observer Newsletter Hall of Fame ====
Inductee
The Rock 'n' Roll Express (Ricky Morton and Robert Gibson)
Ray Fabiani

==== Wrestling Observer Newsletter awards ====
Category	Winner
Wrestler of the Year	Shinsuke Nakamura
Most Outstanding	A.J. Styles
Tag Team of the Year	The Young Bucks (Matt and Nick Jackson)
Most Improved	Rusev
Best on Interviews	Paul Heyman

=== WWE ===
==== WWE Hall of Fame ====
Category	Inductee	Inducted by
Individual	The Ultimate Warrior	Linda McMahon
Individual	Jake Roberts	Diamond Dallas Page
Individual	Lita	Trish Stratus
Individual	Paul Bearer	Kane
Individual	Carlos Colón Sr.	Carlito, Eddie, and Orlando Colón
Individual	Scott Hall	Kevin Nash
Celebrity	Mr. T	Gene Okerlund

==== Slammy Awards ====
Poll	Winner
Fan Participation Award	"You Sold Out"
Double-Cross of the Year	Seth Rollins betrays The Shield and joins The Authority on Raw (June 2)
Animal of the Year	The Bunny
Best Actor	The Rock
Tweet It! Best Twitter Handle or Social Champion	@HEELZiggler
Rivalry of the Year	Daniel Bryan vs. The Authority
Raw Guest Star of the Year	Hugh Jackman
Best Couple of the Year	Daniel Bryan & Brie Bella
Faction of the Year	The Shield (Dean Ambrose, Seth Rollins, & Roman Reigns)
NXT Superstar of the Year	Sami Zayn
Anti-Gravity Moment of the Year	Seth Rollins dives off the balcony at Payback
"Tell Me You Didn't Just Say That" Insult of the Year	The Rock insults Rusev and Lana on Raw (October 6)
WWE Tag Team of the Year	The Usos (Jimmy & Jey Uso)
Breakout Star of the Year	Dean Ambrose
Hashtag of the Year	#RKOOuttaNowhere (Vines)
"This is Awesome" Moment of the Year	Sting debuts to help Team Cena defeat Team Authority at Survivor Series
Surprise Return of the Year	Ultimate Warrior returns to the WWE at the 2014 Hall of Fame induction ceremony, WrestleMania XXX and Raw (April 7)
The OMG Shocking Moment of the Year	Brock Lesnar defeats The Undertaker at WrestleMania XXX, ending The Streak
WWE Diva of the Year	AJ Lee
LOL Moment of the Year	Damien Mizdow as The Miz's stunt double
Match of the Year	Team Cena (John Cena, Dolph Ziggler, Big Show, Erick Rowan, & Ryback) vs. Team Authority (Seth Rollins, Kane, Luke Harper, Rusev, & Mark Henry) in a 5-on-5 Traditional Survivor Series elimination tag team match at Survivor Series
Extreme Moment of the Year	Chris Jericho hits a cross-body on Bray Wyatt from the top of a steel cage on Raw (September 8)
Superstar of the Year	Roman Reigns

== Debuts ==
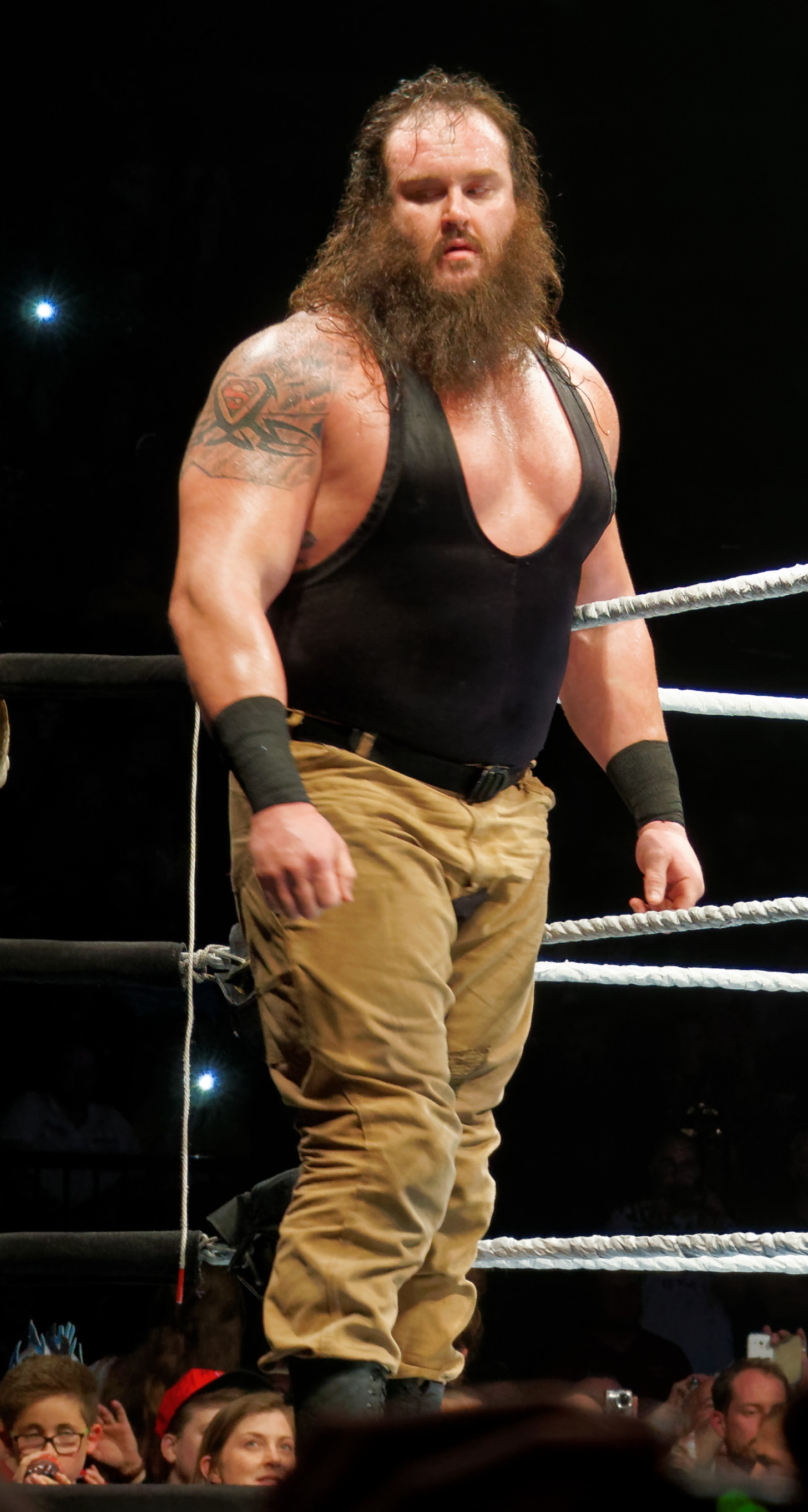
Braun Strowman

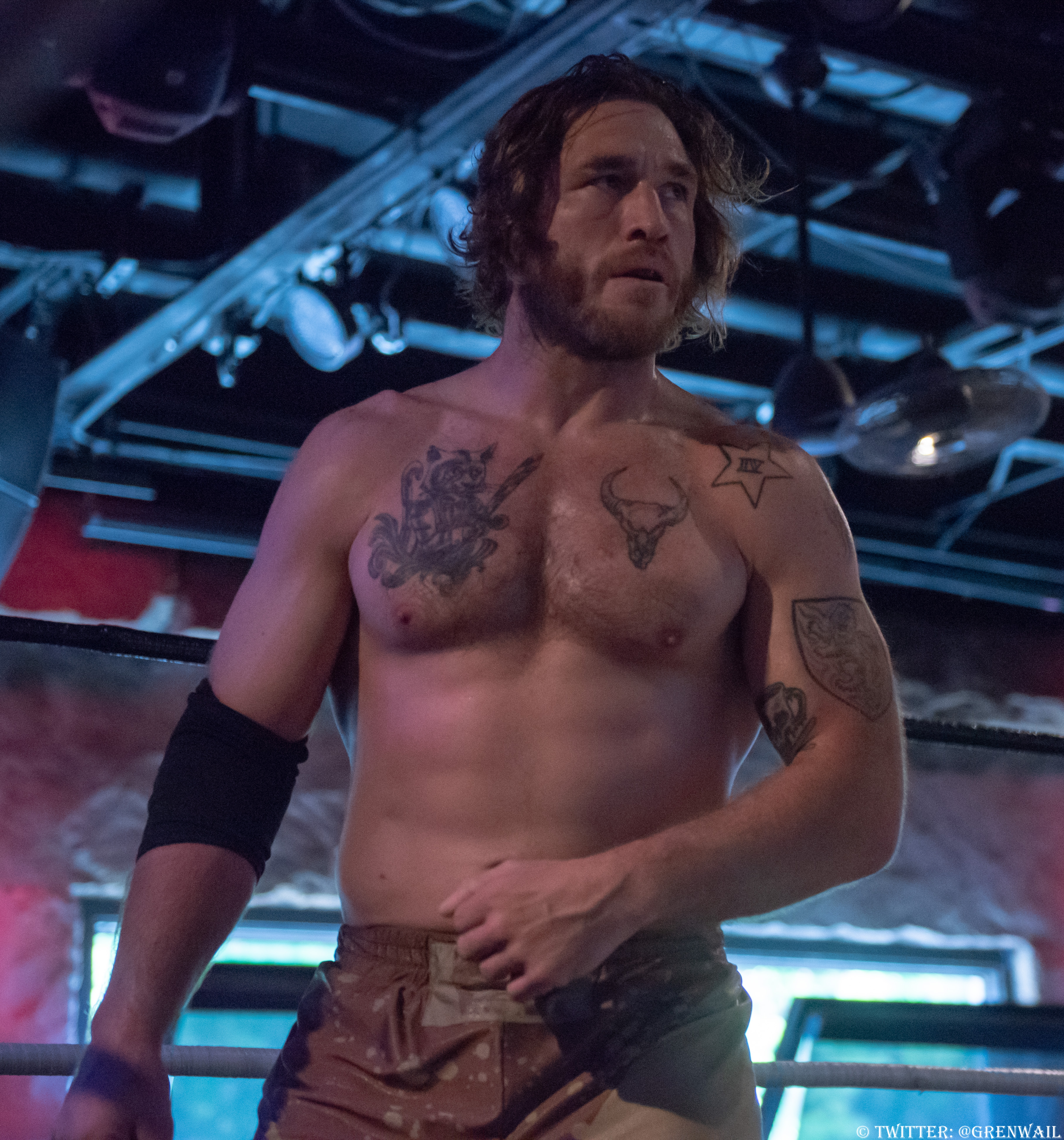
Tom Lawlor

- Uncertain debut date

- Lacey Evans

- January 1 – Dragon lee
- January 2 – Odinson
- January 5 – El Desperado
- January 12 – Yuna Manase
- January 18 – Maggot
- January 28 – Rika Tatsumi
- January 29 – Kotaro Yoshino
- April 12 – Carmelo Hayes
- April 18 – Mandy Leon
- April 20 – Yua Hayashi, Kyle Fletcher and Shotzi
- April 29 – Shunma Katsumata
- May 3 – Nightshade
- May 17 – Tom Lawlor
- May 31 – Chelsea Green/Laurel Van Ness
- June 13
  - Aigle Blanc
  - Tessa Blanchard
- June 21 – Jimmy Lloyd
- July 6 – Hazuki
- July 12 – Kevin Ku
- July 26 – Hyan
- August 6
  - Kota Sekifuda
  - Toshiyuki Sakuda
- September 5 – Chad Gable
- September 18 – Dana Brooke
- October 3 – Velveteen Dream
- October 18
  - Kota Umeda
  - Kouki Iwasaki
- October 29 – Hiroe Nagahama
- November 24 – Michiko Miyagi
- November 28 – Dai Suzuki
- November 29
  - Kazusada Higuchi
  - Ryota Nakatsu
- December 13 – Charli Evans
- December 14 – Joji Otani
- December 17 – Zachary Wentz
- December 19 – Braun Strowman

== Retirements ==
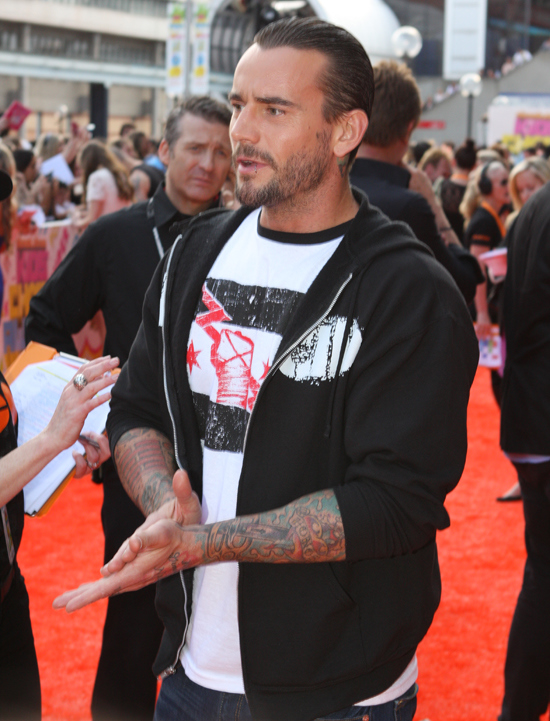
CM Punk

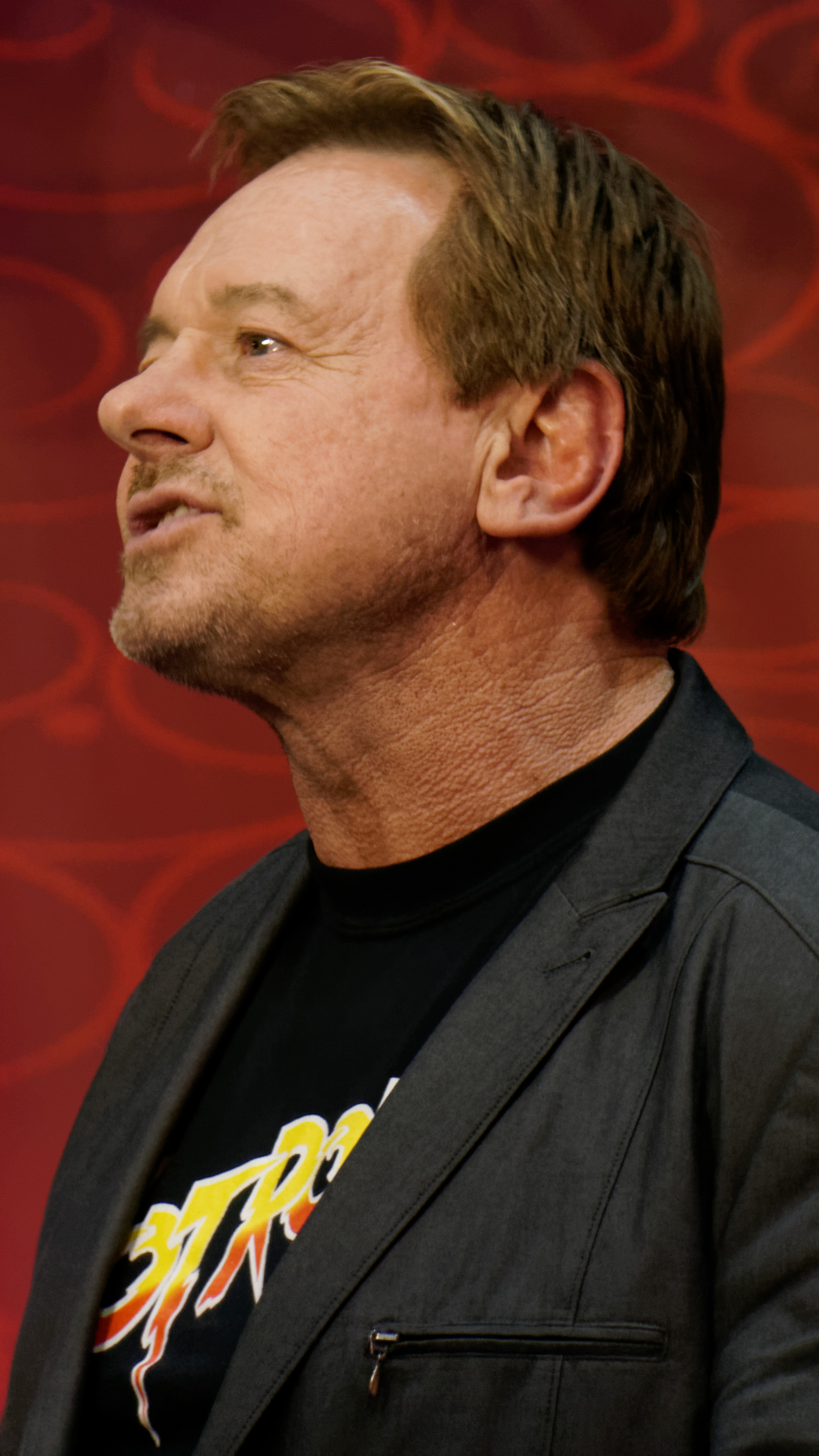
Roddy Piper

- Kaitlyn (August 29, 2010 – January 8, 2014) (first retirement, returned in 2018 on Mae Young Classic)
- Jillian Hall (1998 – January 21, 2014)
- Bonnie Maxon (2000 – January 24, 2014)
- CM Punk (1999–January 2014; returned in 2021)
- Kensuke Sasaki (February 16, 1986 – February 13, 2014)
- El Dandy (1981–2014)
- Axl Rotten (1987–2014)
- Chuck Palumbo (1998–2014)
- Sgt. Slaughter (1972-March 29, 2014)
- Beulah McGillicutty (1995–2014)
- Christian Cage (1995–2014) (first retirement, returned to WWE in June 2020)
- Drake Wuertz (August 31, 2001 – April 27, 2014)
- Sarah Bäckman (2012–2014)
- Jose Gonzalez (1966–2014)
- Adrian Street (1957 – June 14, 2014)
- Natsuki Taiyo (January 3, 2004 – June 1, 2014)
- Batista (October 30, 1999 – June 2, 2014) (first retirement, briefly returned in 2019)
- Aksana (September 2009 – June 10, 2014)
- Vickie Guerrero (July 14, 2005 – June 23, 2014)
- Petey Williams (January 23, 2002 – July 5, 2014)
- Santino Marella (August 17, 2003 – July 6, 2014)
- Matt Bloom (1997 – August 7, 2014) (moved to a trainer)
- Shinya Ishikawa (March 11, 2008 – August 13, 2014)
- Sachie Abe (1996 – August 14, 2014)
- Ronnie Garvin (1962-September 20, 2014)
- El Sicodélico (1968-November 16, 2014)
- Bull Buchanan (1995 – November 22, 2014)
- Corey Graves (March 22, 2000 – December 11, 2014) (moved to color commentator)
- Adam Pearce (May 16, 1996 – December 21, 2014)
- Miho Wakizawa (July 28, 1996 – December 23, 2014)

== Deaths ==
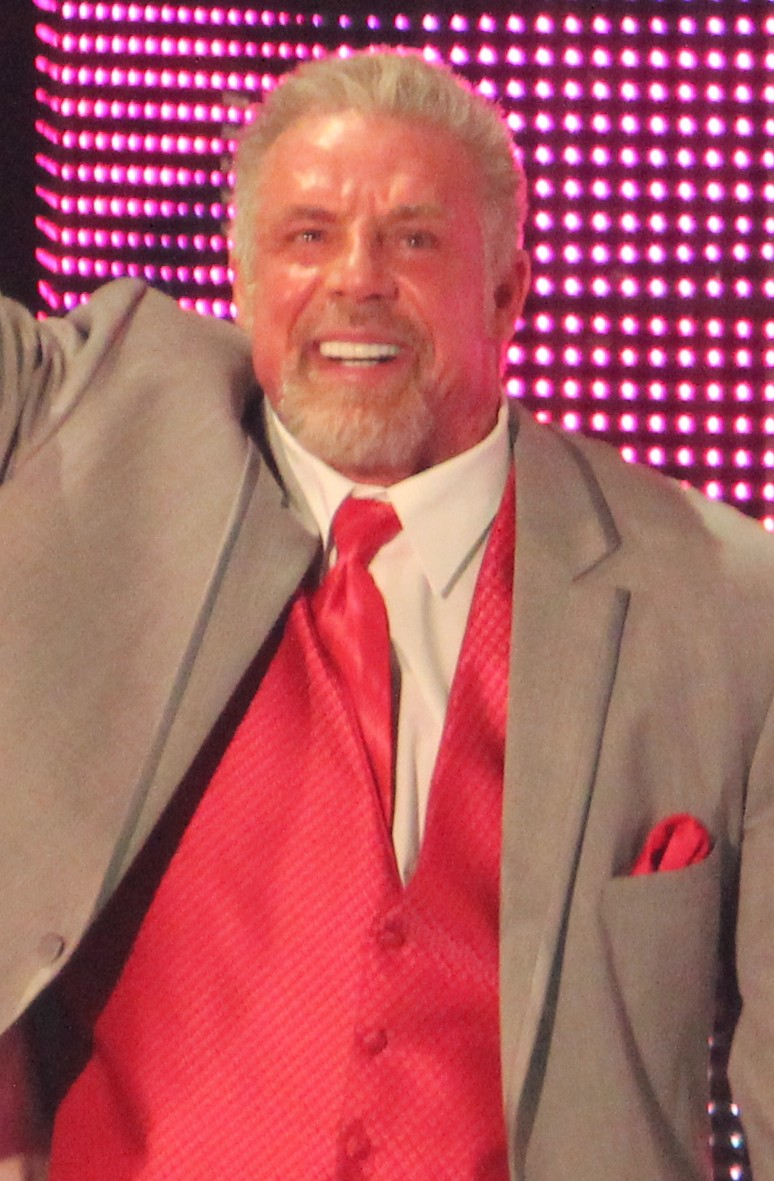
The Ultimate Warrior

- January 6 – Don Chuy, 72
- January 14 – Mae Young, 90
- January 20 – George Scott, 84
- February 18 – Viscera, 43
- March 5:
  - Billy Robinson, 75
  - Jerry Kozak, 79
- March 15 – Lorenzo Parente, 78
- March 17 – Al Oeming, 88
- April 8 – The Ultimate Warrior, 54
- April 25 – Connor Michalek, 8
- April 27 – Lee Marshall, 64
- May 11 - Mark Frear, 44
- July 2 or 3 - Dave Legeno, 50
- August 6 – Ken Lucas, 72
- August 7 - Harold Poole, 70
- August 21 – Maximum Capacity, 46
- September 8 – Sean O'Haire, 43
- September 20 - Ricki Starr, 83
- September 23 – Don Manoukian, 80
- October 12 – Cowboy Bob Kelly, 78
- October 20 – Ox Baker, 80
- October 21 – Johnny Lee Clary, 55
- October 28 – Koichiro Kimura, 44
- October 30 – Bob Geigel, 90
- December 6 – Jimmy Del Ray, 52

== See also ==
- List of NJPW pay-per-view events
- List of ROH pay-per-view events
- List of TNA pay-per-view events
- List of WWE Network events
- List of WWE pay-per-view events
