= TNA Sacrifice (2014) =

2014 Total Nonstop Action Wrestling pay-per-view event

Sacrifice (2014)
- Promotional poster featuring Willow
- Promotion: Total Nonstop Action Wrestling
- Date: April 27, 2014
- City: Orlando, Florida
- Venue: Impact Zone
- Attendance: 800

Pay-per-view chronology
← Previous; Lockdown	Next → Slammiversary XII

Sacrifice chronology
← Previous; 2012	Next → 2016

The 2014 Sacrifice was a professional wrestling pay-per-view (PPV) event that was produced by Total Nonstop Action Wrestling (TNA). It took place on April 27, 2014 at the Impact Zone in Orlando, Florida. It was the ninth event under the Sacrifice chronology and the second event in the TNA 2014 pay-per-view schedule.

Eight matches were contested at the event. In the main event, Eric Young defeated Magnus to retain the TNA World Heavyweight Championship. Other prominent matches included Gunner defeating James Storm in an "I Quit" match, concluding a storyline revolving around Storm's jealousy towards Gunner and attacking his father. In the penultimate match, Bobby Roode defeated Bully Ray in a Tables match. On the undercard, The Wolves (Davey Richards and Eddie Edwards) defeated The BroMans (DJZ, Jessie Godderz and Robbie E) in a 3-on-2 Handicap match to win the TNA World Tag Team Championship, Mr. Anderson defeated Samuel Shaw in a Committed match, Sanada defeated Tigre Uno in the final of their best of three series to retain the TNA X Division Championship, and Angelina Love defeated Madison Rayne to win the TNA Knockouts Championship.

In October 2017, with the launch of the Global Wrestling Network, the event became available to stream on demand. It would later be available on Impact Plus in May 2019.

== Storylines ==
The event featured professional wrestling matches that involved different wrestlers from pre-existing scripted feuds and storylines. Wrestlers portray villains, heroes, or less distinguishable characters in the scripted events that build tension and culminate in a wrestling match or series of matches.

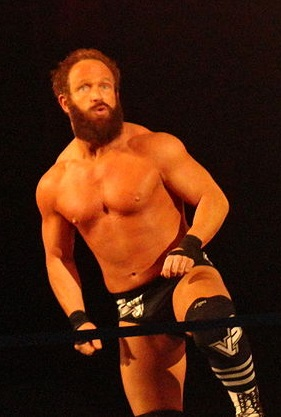
Eric Young walked into Sacrifice as TNA World Heavyweight Champion.

On the April 3 episode of Impact Wrestling, Magnus successfully defended the TNA World Heavyweight Championship in a fatal-four way bout against Samoa Joe, Eric Young and Abyss. Five days later, TNA Director of Wrestling Operations MVP announced a 10-man gauntlet match that took place on the April 10 episode of Impact Wrestling, where the winner gets a TNA World Heavyweight title shot at Sacrifice. The match was won by Young, who requested to have his shot that same night, and went on to beat Magnus for the title. Magnus would invoke his rematch clause against Young for the title at Sacrifice.

At Lockdown on March 9, Dixie Carter introduced Bully Ray as the special guest referee towards the end of the Lethal Lockdown match. During the bout, he slammed Team Dixie's captain Bobby Roode, allowing Team MVP to win. Afterwards, he powerbombed Roode through a table he introduced during the match. On the March 13 episode of Impact Wrestling, Bully explained he didn't want to wind up working for Roode, who would have been another Dixie Carter had he won. The following week, Bully was supposed to have a meeting with Carter but Roode attacked him from behind and beat him down. On the March 27 episode of Impact Wrestling, both men engaged in a brawl where both tried to put each other through a table. The following week, Roode and Ethan Carter III were victorious against Willow and Bully, after putting the latter through a table. Afterwards, Roode and EC3 put him through another two tables. On the April 17 episode of Impact Wrestling, after both men failed in winning a 10-man gauntlet match for a shot at the TNA World Heavyweight Championship, Dixie made her return and berated Bully for screwing her team over. Bully and Roode are set to face each other in a tables match at Sacrifice.

On the March 6 episode of Impact Wrestling, Ethan Carter III took out Kurt Angle by severely damaging his knees, preventing him from competing at Lockdown. The following week, Jeff Hardy's alter ego Willow, seeking revenge on Rockstar Spud and EC3 after costing him the world title at Final Resolution, made his debut against Spud and got himself disqualified, later beating him with an umbrella, stomped his leg wrapped in a chair, and jumped off a ladder to splash him. On the March 20 episode of Impact Wrestling, Bobby Lashley and EC3 had a rematch that ended in a no contest after interference from Willow, attacking the latter and doing the same onto him. The following week, EC3 and Spud went to the woods looking for Willow, only for him to ambush them. On the April 10 episode of Impact Wrestling, Spud distracted Willow during the 10-man gauntlet match, allowing EC3 to eliminate him. Willow challenged them in a handicap match the following week, which he won. After the match, Angle made his return, vowing revenge. On the April 24 episode of Impact Wrestling, after Kurt defeated Spud in a match, EC3 attacked Angle but Willow made the save.

Angelina Love made her return to TNA on the March 13 episode of Impact Wrestling, calling out Velvet Sky for wanting to reunite The Beautiful People. Sky would later accept Love's offer the following week, while Knockouts Champion Madison Rayne declined due to Love's attitude towards her. Later in the show, Love attacked Rayne after the two hugged, establishing herself as a heel in the process. On the March 27 episode of Impact Wrestling, Love defeated Rayne in her return match due to interference from Sky, officially reuniting the original incarnation of the stable. The Beautiful People made their in-ring return the following week, defeating Rayne and Brittany after pinning the latter following the Makeover. On the April 10 episode, Love defeated ODB, Gail Kim and Brittany in a four-way match to become the number one contender to the Knockouts title, facing Rayne for the belt at Sacrifice.

At Lockdown, Gunner defeated James Storm in a steel cage Last Man Standing match. On the March 20 episode of Impact Wrestling, after Storm berated Gunner's father, Gunner attacked Storm, but he managed to handcuff him to the middle rope and threatened his father at ringside. Storm walked away, but returned to smash a beer bottle over the head of Gunner's father. The following week, both men fought in a no disqualification, no countout match where Gunner was victorious. On the April 10 episode of Impact Wrestling, both men failed in winning a 10-man gauntlet match for a shot at the TNA World Heavyweight Championship. The following week, Bobby Roode issued an open challenge for a tables match which was answered by Gunner, but Roode got the win with help from Storm. Afterwards, Storm and Roode beat down Gunner until Bully Ray made the save. Storm and Gunner challenged each other in an "I Quit" match at Sacrifice.

Fresh off his victory at Lockdown, after escaping the cage following the use of Christy Hemme as a distraction by pulling her through the camera cut-out of the steel cage, Samuel Shaw lost a street fight rematch against Mr. Anderson the following week, bringing a mannequin dressed as Hemme to the ring. On the April 3 episode of Impact Wrestling, Shaw defeated Anderson in a Straitjacket match after rendering him unconscious following two kata gatame attempts. The following week, Hemme and Anderson attempted to have Shaw committed, but he escaped. On the April 24 episode of Impact Wrestling, Anderson visits Shaw's family home and meets his mother named "Christy", who informs him that he still lives with her in the basement. After looking at Shaw's childhood bedroom, he arrives and brawls with Anderson as the cameraman escapes, coming across Shaw's mom complaining about the noise as Shaw appears and hugs his mother before the cameraman leaves.

New TNA acquisitions Tigre Uno and Sanada were put against each other in a best of three series for Sanada's X Division Championship. Sanada won the first match on the April 10 episode of Impact Wrestling, and on the following week Uno won the second match. At Sacrifice, the rubber match of the series was set, with the X Division title on the line.

On February 23, at a TNA house show in Morgantown, West Virginia, The Wolves (Davey Richards and Eddie Edwards) defeated The BroMans (Robbie E and Jessie Godderz) for the TNA World Tag Team Championship, only to lose them the following week back to the BroMans during Wrestle-1's Kaisen: Outbreak event on March 2. Since then, the Wolves have had numerous rematches for the titles on Impact Wrestling, with the BroMans either using excuses to avoid defending the belts, having the third member of the team DJZ fill in for defenses, or by getting blatantly disqualified. At Sacrifice, all three BroMans will defend the titles against the Wolves in a three-on-two handicap match.

== Event ==
Other on-screen personnel
Commentators	Mike Tenay
Commentators	Taz
Ring announcers	Christy Hemme
Ring announcers	Jeremy Borash (Main event)
Referees	Brian Hebner
Referees	Brian Stiffler
Referees	Scott Wheeler
Interviewer	Jeremy Borash

=== Preliminary matches ===
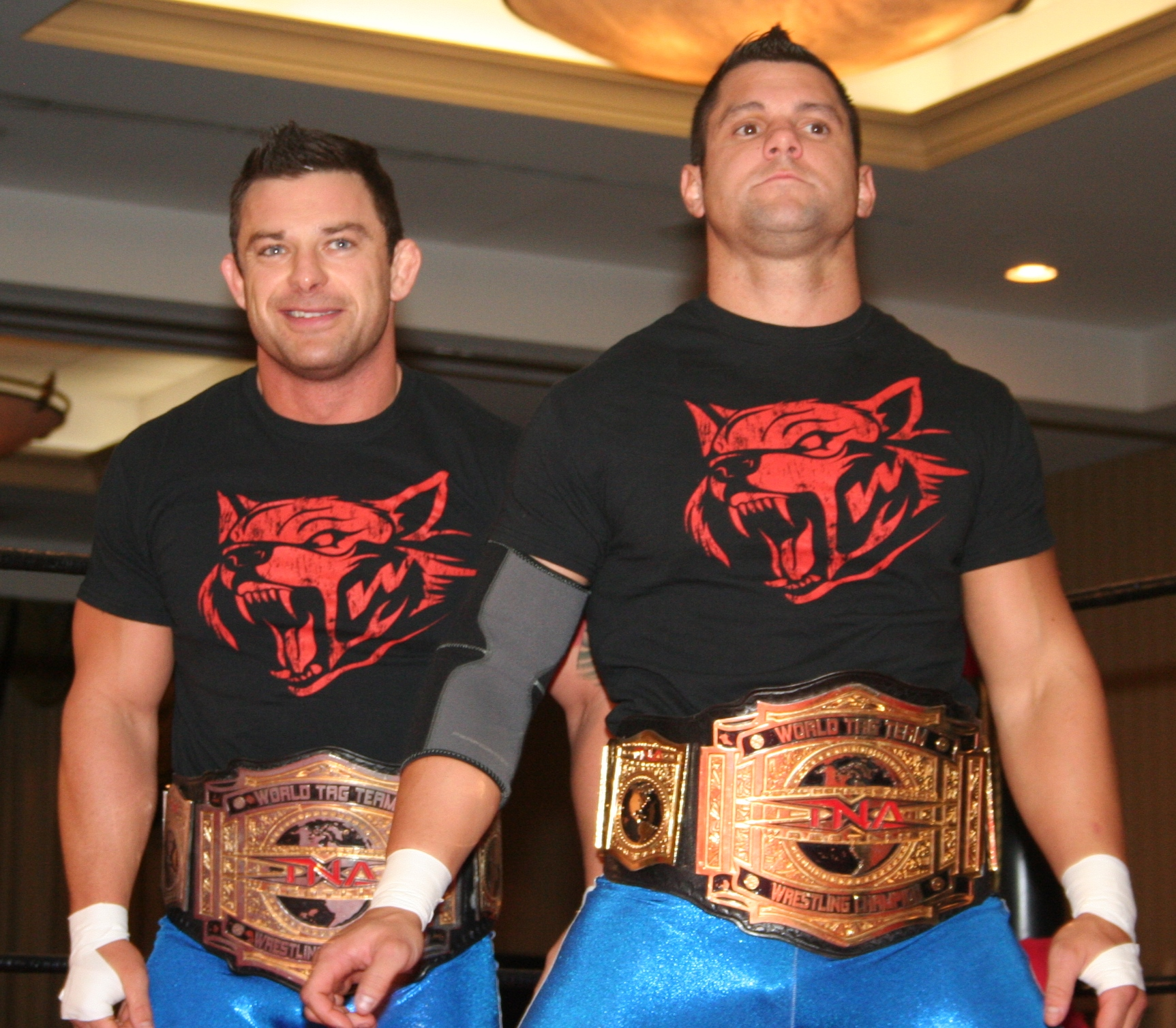
The Wolves (Davey Richards and Eddie Edwards) became TNA World Tag Team Champions at Sacrifice.

The opening match of the event was The Wolves (Davey Richards and Eddie Edwards) versus The BroMans (DJZ, Jessie Godderz and Robbie E) in a three-on-two handicap match for the TNA World Tag Team Championship. Before the match began, Edwards cut a promo on how The BroMans always manage to keep their titles by disqualification, but said tonight was going to be different. He gave Christy Hemme a note that read, by order of MVP, the match will now fall under No DQ rules. The Wolves start the match by sending DJZ to the floor, as well as Robbie and Jessie with stereo hurricanranas. They dump them over the top to the floor, toss DJZ onto them and hit all three BroMans with suicide dives at ringside. The BroMans get the advantage after DJZ hits Edwards with a laptop and Jessie drops Richards on the barricade, continuing their assault on the former in the ring. Edwards gives Jessie a back suplex and attempts to tag in Richards, but DJZ pulls him from the ring apron, and The BroMans regain control by triple teaming the former on the outside. After hitting Robbie and Jessie with a double hurricanrana and a kick to DJZ's head, Edwards tags in Richards who gives all three of them kicks and clotheslines, and goes up top to hit a double missile dropkick on Jessie and DJZ. After DJZ hits Jessie with the laptop by accident and gets taken out himself, The Wolves hit Robbie with a powerbomb-double knee backbreaker combination and deliver double stomps from the top onto Jessie, pinning him to win the tag titles for the second time.

Next, a Committed match was contested between Mr. Anderson and Samuel Shaw, where the objective is to incapacitate your opponent and put him in the padded wagon. After taking turns getting in and out of the ring, Shaw grabs Hemme and shoves her into Anderson, who brushes her aside and attacks Shaw on the outside. Anderson brings Shaw back into the ring to give him a back body drop and clothesline him to the floor, only for Shaw to hit Anderson on the ring apron. Shaw misses an attack and hits the outside, leaving him open to ringside attacks by Anderson, who then gets thrown to the steel steps by Shaw. After applying a modified triangle choke on Anderson, he goes after Hemme in the ring who slaps him, allowing Anderson to hit Shaw with a series of clotheslines and a swinging neckbreaker. On the outside, Anderson slams Shaw on the barricade, and delivers a rolling senton splash to him on the ramp. Anderson uses a steel chair to hit Shaw, throws him into a barricade, and they go to the back to have Jeremy Borash interview them, with Anderson mimicking Shaw's voice. After slamming Shaw on a cart and pushing it towards some production boxes backstage, Anderson checks on the padded wagon but gets attacked from behind by Shaw. Hemme appears and knees Shaw in the groin, leaving him open for a "Mic Check" by Anderson, who then throws him into the wagon and closes the doors to win the match.

The third match involved the team of Kurt Angle and Willow against the team of Ethan Carter III and Rockstar Spud. EC3 tags in Spud to avoid Angle, who threatens to send him back to England if he doesn't tag out. EC3 is tagged back in but exits the ring, leaving Angle to drop to his knees and give EC3 a chance, who falls for it and gets trapped in an ankle lock. EC3 immediately tags Spud to escape but the latter joins him on the outside, leaving them open to an attack by Willow from up top. Angle goes after EC3 and hits an overhead belly-to-belly suplex, but gets thrown to steel steps afterwards. Willow confronts Spud in the ring, gets double attacked by him and EC3, but fights back with a "Whisper in the Wind" onto both of them. Willow attempts the "Twist of Fate" on Spud, but EC3 clotheslines him and tags back in to continue the beat down. Angle gets back in the ring and delivers three German suplexes on EC3 and applies the "Ankle Lock", but gets jumped by Spud who he takes out with an overhead belly-to-belly and applies the lock on him as well. EC3 attacks Angle with a chop block but then gets hit by Willow, who uses Spud to hit "Poetry in Motion" and throw him out of the ring. Willow and Angle hit Spud with the "Twist of Fate" and "Angle Slam", before finishing him with a "Swanton Bomb" to win the match.

The fourth match saw Sanada against Tigre Uno in the last of their best of three series for the X Division Championship. After going back-and-forth with counters onto each other, Sanada hits Uno with a hurricanrana. Uno attempts to suplex Sanada into the ring, but gets countered into an abdominal stretch, gets cradle rolled all over the ring, and kicks out at two. Uno hits Sanada with a tilt-a-whirl arm drag that transitions into a cover, but only gets two, leading him to kick Sanada's head for another two count. Sanada escapes the armbar submission by Uno, and applies a dragon sleeper on him which he escapes, but manages to hit a dropkick as he jumps off the top rope. Uno escapes a Tiger suplex attempt by Sanada, takes him off the apron with a springboard dropkick, and hits a twisting flip dive on the outside. Back in the ring, Sanada lands some rights onto Uno who answers with an enzuigiri, but counters a split-legged moonsault by lifting his knees. After hitting two springboard chops onto Uno, Sanada attempts a third one but misses, and gets caught in a release German suplex to the corner, but manages to kick out at two. Uno gets tripped up on the top rope by Sanada who hits a hurricanrana, followed by a Tiger suplex that only gets him a two count. Sanada misses the moonsault but lands on his feet, and attempts another Tiger suplex on Uno who counters it into a roll up for two. Uno hits Sanada with a high cradle into a DDT, but misses the "Sabertooth Splash", allowing Sanada to hit the moonsault and pin him to retain the title. The two shake hands after the match.

Next was an "I Quit" match between Gunner and James Storm. The two trade right hands to each other, Gunner landing a jumping clothesline and some more rights, but Storm fights back with a clothesline that sends Gunner to the outside. After smacking Storm's head on the steps, Gunner jumps off of them to deliver a clothesline, throws him in the ring and fills it with weapons. Storm catches Gunner in the ropes and hits him with a hangman's cutter, the latter refusing to quit. Storm attempts to make Gunner submit by choking him near the ropes, and hitting him with steel chairs and a cookie sheet, but he remains defiant. Gunner comes back with a high knee to Storm and the two exchange trash can lid shots, the former taking Storm out with a trash can before him hitting a diving headbutt, but he refuses to quit. Storm avoids Gunner's charge and hits the ring post, and knocks him out with a kick to the head and a hangman's DDT to the steps. Back in the ring, Storm brings a beer bottle and hits Gunner over the head, busting him open. Gunner refuses to quit after Storm applies a Boston crab and repeated whips to the back with the referee's belt, gets knocked out with the "Last Call", and says "never" to the referee. Gunner fights back after being smashed into the turnbuckles, hitting Storm with the "Hangar 18" three times, and giving him a superplex on the guard railing. Storm quits after Gunner drives a glass shard into his head.

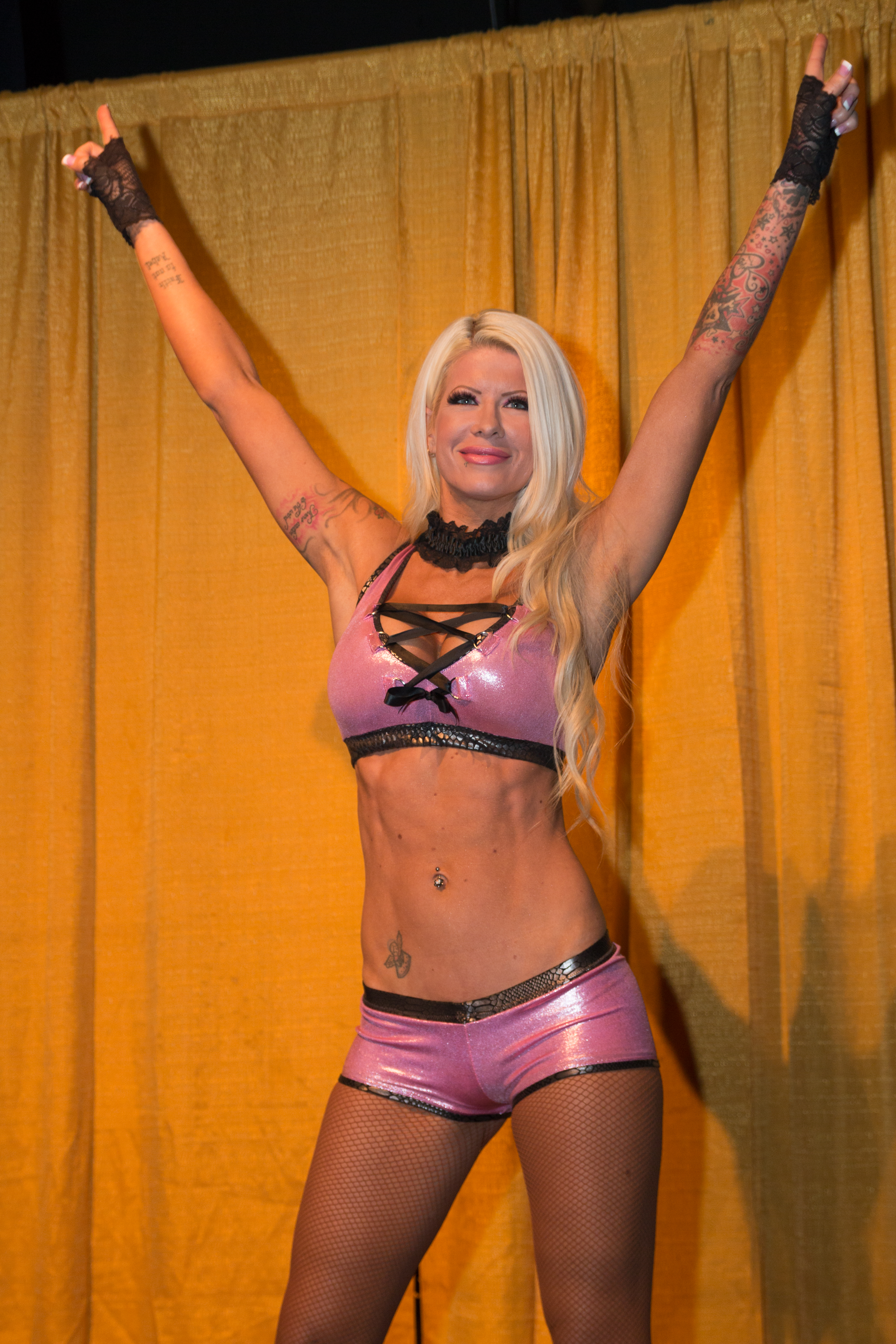
Angelina Love won the TNA Knockouts Championship for a then-record sixth time.

The sixth match saw Madison Rayne defend the Knockouts Championship against Angelina Love (with Velvet Sky). Rayne gets the early advantage with a shoulder block and some arm drags that forces Love to exit the ring. Love gets a side headlock and shoulder block on Rayne, but gets tripped up and leaves the ring, only to get hit by a baseball slide immediately afterwards. Rayne hits the apron after a blocked kick attempt, and Love distracts the referee for Sky to drag her back into the ring, but only gets a two count. Love delivers rights to Rayne and turns the referee's attention to her as Sky chokes Rayne in the ropes, but then gets back elbowed and put into a sunset flip that she kicks out of at two. Love regains control with a clothesline and hits a dropkick on Rayne that sends her to the outside, distracting the referee again to allow Sky to get some stomps before sending her back in the ring, but only gets another two count. Rayne escapes Love's leg-assisted full nelson and hits multiple clotheslines and an enzuigiri, before trapping her in the "Scissor Stomp". Love rolls out of the ring with Sky attempting to help her, but both of them get hit by Rayne with a dive off the apron. After delivering the "Rayne Drop", Rayne charges at Love but hits the ring post, leaving her open for the "Botox Injection" that she kicks out of at two. Love misses the top-rope crossbody and gets hit with a spear, but Sky distracts the referee by shaking her ass and pushing him aside to blind Rayne with hairspray, allowing Love to roll her up and win the title for the sixth time.

The seventh and final match on the undercard saw Bobby Roode take on Bully Ray in a tables match. Ray gets the early advantage with a back body drop, some clotheslines and a side slam, setting up a table at ringside afterwards. Roode beats on Ray but gets thrown into the ring post, the latter setting up a second table before being clotheslined. Back in the ring, Roode sets up a table in the corner and escapes a powerslam attempt by Ray, hitting a dropkick and clothesline to the opposite corner. Roode hits a neckbreaker and resets the table on the mat, he and Ray counter each other's suplex attempts to the table, with Roode getting slammed away from it. Ray attempts an uranage and two powerbombs on Roode, gets the third one through the table, but the referee is knocked out during that sequence. Ray brings another table into the ring, gets hit with a spinebuster by Roode, but catches him with the "Bully Cutter" as he jumps from the middle rope. Ray places Roode over the two tables outside the ring, climbs up top to splash on him, but gets pushed by someone and goes through the tables. After the bell rings, the person is revealed to be Dixie Carter in disguise, who tells Ray to never double cross her again.

=== Main event ===
In the main event, Eric Young defended the TNA World Heavyweight Championship against Magnus. The two lock up and go into the corner, Young avoids Magnus' attacks and walks over his back. They trade side headlocks with one another, Magnus escaping Young's with a back suplex for two. Young sends Magnus to the outside, the latter turns to the ramp to avoid a suicide dive, but gets taken out with a slingshot cross body. Magnus catches Young jumping from the apron with a powerslam, but only gets a two count. Young gives Magnus a northern lights suplex for two, gets taken out himself with a clothesline and kicks out, but gets a knee into the gut. Magnus applies a camel clutch onto Young, who crotches him by lifting his knees, and both men hit double cross bodies and clotheslines on each other. Both men stand up and trade blows with each other, Young takes out Magnus with a flying forearm and clothesline, looks for the piledriver but the latter escapes and gets hit with a belly-to-belly suplex instead. Magnus avoids a moonsault and slams Young, hits him with a flying elbow drop, but only gets a two count. Young catches Magnus with a wheelbarrow into a neckbreaker, hits a top-rope elbow of his own, but Magnus kicks out at two. Young attempts the piledriver but gets caught in the "King's Lynn Cloverleaf", managing to reach the ropes and apply a sharpshooter on Magnus, who also gets to the ropes to break the hold. Magnus catches Young on the top-rope and hits him with the Michinoku Driver, but gets a two count instead. The referee catches Magnus bringing a crowbar into the ring, who then attempts to low blow Young but gets hit with the piledriver, kicking out at two. Magnus attempts his own piledriver but gets slingshot into the turnbuckle, allowing Young to hit a second piledriver and flying elbow, pinning him to retain his title.

== Reception ==
Sacrifice was met with mixed to positive reviews. Nolan Howell of Slam! Wrestling rated the event a 2.25 out of 5 stars. His star ratings for each match are as follows: 2.5 for the BroMans-Wolves, 0.75 for Anderson-Shaw, 2 for Spud-EC3 and Angle-Willow, 3.5 for Sanada-Uno, 3 for Storm-Gunner, 1.5 for Love-Rayne, 0 for Roode-Ray and lastly 3.25 for the main event.

Larry Csonka of 411Mania rated the matches out of five stars in his report of the show. The highest-rated bout was the main event receiving 3 3/4 stars with Csonka writing: "How absolutely refreshing, a one on one world title match that is filled with good pro wrestling and no bullshit." He gave the TNA World Tag Team Championship match 3 1/4 stars, calling it a "Good and fast paced opener and the title change came at the right time." He gave the Willow-Angle versus EC3-Spud tag team bout 2 stars. The X Division Championship match received 2 1/2 stars with Csonka calling it "a bit sloppy and disconnected at times." The I Quit match garnered 3 1/2 stars with Csonka giving credit to both wrestlers' continued improvement but felt it lacked the crowd reaction from their Lockdown match. Csonka commended both performers in the Tables match but only gave it 2 1/2 stars, criticizing the finish for taking away their hard work. The lowest-rated match on the card were the Committed and Knockout Championship matches, each rated 1 1/2 stars.

Brian Mazique of Bleacher Report gave the show an overall B− grade. He gave the TNA World Heavyweight Championship match an A− grade, praising both wrestlers for their performances, but couldn't remove the similarities that Young's storyline has with Daniel Bryan's. Mazique clarified: "It wasn't a bad main event, if you can get beyond the less-than-original packaging of the victor." Both the X Division Championship and I Quit bouts received an A grade with Mazique writing that the former had "awesomely executed sequences" and the latter resembled "an old-school ECW match." He gave the Tables bout a B grade, feeling disappointed with the finish to a "pretty solid match" and the continued direction of the angle moving forward. Mazique gave both the Committed and Willow-Angle versus EC3-Spud tag team matches a C grade, saying they had little crowd interest during their respective bouts. The lowest-rated match on the card was the Knockouts Championship bout getting a C− grade with Mazique commenting that "this was like a WWE Divas match." He concluded that: "This was a decent show that hardcore TNA fans likely had a love-hate relationship with. There were elements that remind you of what you love about the promotion, and some that likely cause frustration."

Former WWE commentator Jim Ross was critical of the crowd being "embarrassingly quiet" and giving "little to no motivation" towards the performers during the event. He commented about the same crowd that also attend the Impact tapings, saying if their not reacting on the TV show as well as on pay-per-view, then it makes the show "sound uninspired and not 'must see' TV."

== Aftermath ==
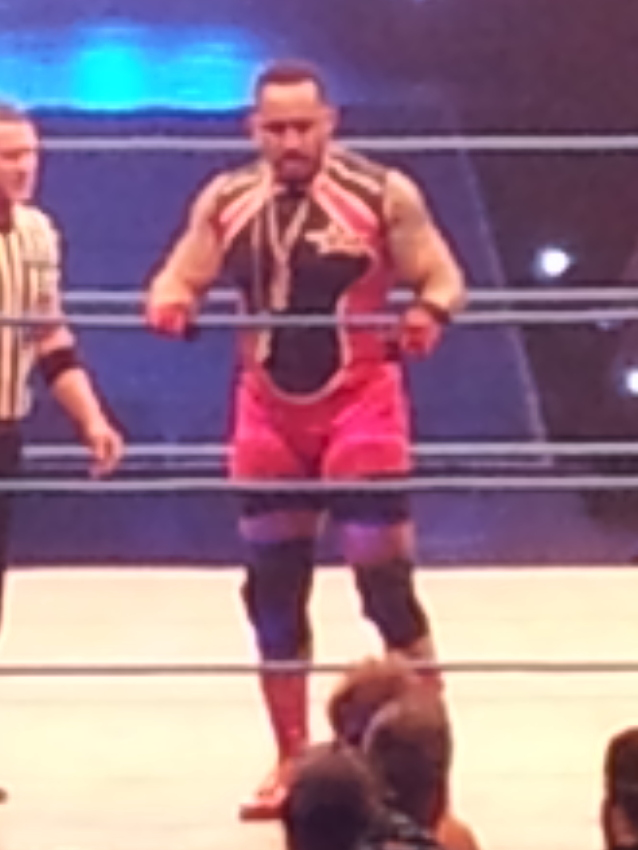
MVP challenged Eric Young for the TNA World Heavyweight Championship at Slammiversary XII.

On the May 1 episode of Impact Wrestling, MVP conducted a #1 Contenders Tournament to determine who will challenge Eric Young for his TNA World Heavyweight Championship, later in the show. Bobby Roode got a bye to the finals, and Gunner won his match against Mr. Anderson after interference from James Storm. In the finals, Roode defeated Gunner to become the #1 contender to Young's world title. In the main event, Young beat Roode after hitting a flying elbow drop to retain his title. The following week, Young and Roode agreed to have a rematch against each other for the title but MVP cancelled it, and informed Young that he will announce his next opponent for Slammiversary later in the show. MVP met with Young in the ring, punched him in the face and beat him down, saying he will see him at the pay-per-view.

Angelina Love went on to feud with Gail Kim, attacking each other on multiple occasions. On the June 12 episode of Impact Wrestling, Kim defeated Brittany and Madison Rayne to become the number one contender for Love's championship, setting up a title match at Slammiversary.

On the May 1 episode of Impact Wrestling, James Storm attempted to cost Gunner a TNA World Title shot during his match against Mr. Anderson, but ended up hitting the latter instead. Later that night, Anderson confronted Storm after his match against Willow, hitting the former with a "Mic Check" as he charged at him. The two would meet in a match on the May 15 episode of Impact Wrestling, with Storm getting the victory after spitting beer into Anderson's face and hitting the "Last Call". The following week, Anderson and Storm meet at a bar for a drinking contest, with the former acting drunk by only consuming fake beer. On the June 5 episode of Impact Wrestling, Anderson mocks him by wearing a cowboy outfit and acting drunk, leading Storm to knock Anderson out and challenge him at Slammiversary.

Samuel Shaw would not be seen until the May 15 episode of Impact Wrestling, where he was visited by Gunner at the psychiatric facility. Gunner spent weeks trying to help Shaw by telling a story about a Marine friend he knew that was also committed, played Go Fish and looked at his drawings. On the June 26 episode of Impact Wrestling, Gunner was able to release Shaw from the facility under his supervision.

== Results ==
No.	Results	Stipulations	Times
1	The Wolves (Davey Richards and Eddie Edwards) defeated The BroMans (DJZ, Jessie Godderz and Robbie E) (c)	Handicap match for the TNA World Tag Team Championship	10:14
2	Mr. Anderson (with Christy Hemme) defeated Samuel Shaw	Committed match	10:30
3	Kurt Angle and Willow defeated Ethan Carter III and Rockstar Spud	Tag team match	09:04
4	Sanada (c) defeated Tigre Uno	Singles match for the TNA X Division Championship (Note: Final in the best of three series.)	09:29
5	Gunner defeated James Storm	"I Quit" match	18:50
6	Angelina Love (with Velvet Sky) defeated Madison Rayne (c)	Singles match for the TNA Knockouts Championship	08:08
7	Bobby Roode defeated Bully Ray	Tables match	13:42
8	Eric Young (c) defeated Magnus	Singles match for the TNA World Heavyweight Championship	15:50
(c) / – the champion(s) heading into the match

== See also ==
- 2014 in professional wrestling
