= Bound for Glory (2014) =

2014 Total Nonstop Action Wrestling pay-per-view event

Bound for Glory (2014) バウンド・フォー・グローリー 2014 (Japanese)
- Promotional Poster
- Promotions: Total Nonstop Action Wrestling; Wrestle-1
- Date: October 12, 2014
- City: Tokyo, Japan
- Venue: Korakuen Hall
- Attendance: 1,500
- Tagline: TNA invades the Land of the Rising Sun

Pay-per-view chronology
← Previous; Slammiversary XII	Next → Slammiversary

TNA Bound for Glory chronology
← Previous; 2013	Next → 2015

The 2014 Bound for Glory (バウンド・フォー・グローリー 2014 (Baundo fō gurōrī 2014)) was a professional wrestling pay-per-view (PPV) event produced by Total Nonstop Action Wrestling (TNA), in collaboration with Japanese promotion Wrestle-1 (W-1). It took place on October 12, 2014 at the Korakuen Hall in Tokyo, Japan. It was the tenth pay-per-view under the Bound for Glory chronology, the second TNA/W-1 joint event held in Japan in 2014 (following Kaisen: Outbreak), and the fourth and last event in the 2014 TNA PPV schedule.

It was the first Bound for Glory to not feature either the NWA World Heavyweight Championship or the TNA World Heavyweight Championship in the main event. Due to the time difference between the United States and Japan, the PPV aired on tape delay. Also Taz and Mike Tenay were not there live, and instead did commentary from TNA headquarters in Nashville, Tennessee. A traditional four-sided ring was used for the event, as opposed to the six-sided ring TNA predominantly uses. This was the first Bound for Glory event at which no championships changed hands - both titles that were defended at the event were retained.

Eight matches took place at the event. The main event featured The Great Muta and Tajiri defeating James Storm and The Great Sanada.

In October 2017, with the launch of the Global Wrestling Network, the event became available to stream on demand.

== Production ==
Other on-screen personnel
Commentator	Mike Tenay
Commentator	Taz
Ring announcers	Christy Hemme
Ring announcers	Jeremy Borash (Main Event)
Referee	Earl Hebner
Referee	Brian Hebner
Referee	Brian Stiffler

=== Background ===
On June 25 before TNA Impact Wrestling tapings in New York City, TNA President Dixie Carter along with Wrestle-1 founder/owner and Japanese wrestling legend The Great Muta held a press conference at the Manhattan Center to announce that the annual Bound for Glory pay-per-view would take place in Tokyo, Japan at Korakuen Hall.

=== Storylines ===
Bound for Glory featured professional wrestling matches that involved different wrestlers from pre-existing scripted feuds and storylines. Wrestlers portrayed villains, heroes, or less distinguishable characters in the scripted events that built tension and culminated in a wrestling match or series of matches.

Wrestlers competing for TNA were: Samoa Joe, Team 3D (Bully Ray and Devon), MVP, James Storm, The Great Sanada, Ethan Carter III, Low Ki, Abyss, Manik, Tommy Dreamer, Havok and Velvet Sky. Originally, Davey Richards and Eddie Edwards were also announced for the event, but they were later replaced by Team 3D.

Wrestlers competing for W-1 were: Tajiri, Kaz Hayashi, Ryota Hama, Kazma Sakamoto, Minoru Tanaka, Andy Wu, El Hijo del Pantera, Yusuke Kodama, The Great Muta and Jiro Kuroshio.

In June 2014, Storm would begin a program where he would confront Sanada backstage, berating his mentor The Great Muta, while slapping him in the face as a way to break him down, multiple weeks in a row. On the July 24th, 2014 edition of Impact, Storm would confront The Great Muta, calling him a fraud, and proclaim himself to be "The Legend" (which in the following weeks replaced his longtime nickname of "The Cowboy"). After spitting beer in Muta's face, Sanada would run Storm out of the ring, before attacking Muta himself with a steel chair, and bowing to Storm, revealing an unknown alliance between them. The following week Storm would proclaim himself as Sanada's new mentor, and master. In the following weeks, TNA would air vignettes of Storm having a cult like hold over Sanada, portraying Storm having him tied up, breaking him down physically and mentally, and proclaiming that "The Revolution Is Coming". On the August 27 Impact Wrestling, Sanada accompanied by Storm debuted the new ring name "The Great Sanada" and a look inspired by The Great Muta, before defeating Austin Aries with help from Storm.

TNA announced that Samoa Joe and Havok would be defending their X Division and Knockouts Championships at the event. However, due to already taped episodes of Impact Wrestling set to air after the event, neither Joe or Havok were the actual champions at the time of Bound for Glory.

== Results ==
No.	Results	Stipulations	Times
1	Minoru Tanaka defeated Manik by submission	Singles match	09:53
2	Ethan Carter III defeated Ryota Hama	Singles match	05:50
3	MVP defeated Kazma Sakamoto	Singles match	08:07
4	Samoa Joe (c) defeated Kaz Hayashi and Low Ki by submission	Three-Way Dance for the TNA X Division Championship	10:32
5	Novus (Jiro Kuroshio and Yusuke Kodama) defeated Andy Wu and El Hijo del Pantera	Tag team match	09:15
6	Team 3D (Bully Ray and Devon) defeated Abyss and Tommy Dreamer	Hardcore match	12:53
7	Havok (c) defeated Velvet Sky by submission	Singles match for the TNA Knockouts Championship	06:00
8	The Great Muta and Tajiri defeated The Revolution (The Great Sanada and James Storm)	Tag team match	14:00
(c) / – the champion(s) heading into the match

== See also ==
- 2014 in professional wrestling
