= Slammiversary XII =

2014 Total Nonstop Action Wrestling pay-per-view event

- Promotional poster featuring Eric Young
- Promotion: Total Nonstop Action Wrestling
- Date: June 15, 2014
- City: Arlington, Texas
- Venue: College Park Center
- Attendance: 3,500
- Tagline: "A Dream Twelve Years In The Making"

Pay-per-view chronology
← Previous; Sacrifice	Next → Bound for Glory

Slammiversary chronology
← Previous; XI	Next → 2015

Slammiversary XII was a professional wrestling pay-per-view (PPV) event produced by the Total Nonstop Action Wrestling (TNA) promotion. It took place on June 15, 2014 at the College Park Center in Arlington, Texas and was the 12th anniversary celebration for TNA, the tenth event in the Slammiversary chronology, and the third event in the 2014 TNA PPV schedule.

Nine professional wrestling matches were featured on the card. The main event consisted of Eric Young defeating Bobby Lashley and Austin Aries to retain the TNA World Heavyweight Championship after both men won their respective matches to qualify for the main event due to MVP being injured and in no condition to compete. The second main event saw Ethan Carter III overcoming Bully Ray in a Texas Death match. The event also featured an appearance from The Von Erichs and an appearance from some of the NFL's Dallas Cowboys. Kurt Angle made his return to announce the next TNA Hall Of Fame inductee.

In October 2017, with the launch of the Global Wrestling Network, the event became available to stream on demand. It would later be available on Impact Plus in May 2019.

== Storylines ==
Other on-screen personnel
Commentators	Mike Tenay
Commentators	Taz
Ring announcers	Christy Hemme
Ring announcers	Jeremy Borash
Referees	Earl Hebner
Referees	Brian Hebner
Referees	Brian Stiffler
Interviewer	Jeremy Borash

Slammiversary featured professional wrestling matches between competitors involved in ongoing scripted feuds and storylines. Wrestlers portrayed heroes, villains, or ambiguous characters in these narratives, which built tension and ultimately culminated in one or more matches.

On April 27, 2014, at Sacrifice, Dixie Carter cost Bully Ray a tables match against Bobby Roode, when Carter (disguised as a production worker) pushed Bully off the top rope and through a table. On the May 1 episode of Impact Wrestling, Bully was seeking revenge against Dixie and vowed to put her through a table, but MVP ordered Bully to let her go and banned both Dixie and Bully from the building. Over the following weeks, Bully Ray invaded TNA Headquarters and Dixie Carter's home. On the May 22 episode of Impact Wrestling, Dixie and Ethan Carter III came out to confront MVP and his alliance for their actions. But, when Bully interrupted the confrontation, he was ultimately laid out by MVP's alliance and put through a table by EC3, setting up a match between Bully and EC3 at the PPV.

On the May 1 episode of Impact Wrestling, after just barely escaping a brawl with Abyss, Magnus was found packing his bags in the back and preparing to leave the arena. Bram — an old friend of Magnus — arrived and decided to help him rediscover the violent and vicious ways of his youth. The following week, Willow defeated Magnus by disqualification when Bram attacked Willow, and beat him around ringside and handcuffed him to the ropes. Bram then beat Willow with a piece of the turnbuckle. On the June 5 episode of Impact Wrestling, Willow defeated Bram by disqualification when Magnus attacked Willow with a pry bar, setting up a match between Magnus and Willow at the pay-per-view.

On the May 1 episode of Impact Wrestling, Mr. Anderson attacked James Storm after Storm lost to Willow - this was retaliation for Storm costing Anderson a World title opportunity earlier in the night when Storm tried to attack Anderson's opponent Gunner and inadvertently hit Anderson. On May 22, Mr. Anderson challenged Storm to a drinking contest (drinking non-alcoholic beer, while Storm was drinking regular beer), then went on to attack him outside the bar. On the June 5 episode of Impact Wrestling, Anderson impersonated Storm, with Storm's retro entrance music, then attacked him after he refused to grant him a match. After Anderson lost the brawl, the match was set Slammiversary.

On the May 8 episode of Impact Wrestling, TNA World Heavyweight Champion Eric Young and Bobby Roode agreed to have a rematch, but TNA Director of Operations MVP declined the match and promised Young that he would reveal his opponent at June's Slammiversary event. MVP revealed himself as the opponent, which was shown when he attacked the champion. The following week, Young challenged MVP for a match, which he agreed, but was disqualified when Kenny King attacked Young. Bobby Lashley pretended to help Young but he speared him . On the May 22 episode of Impact Wrestling, MVP, King, and Lashley explained their actions - MVP wanted the world title, which would give him complete power in TNA. The new group began targeting wrestlers including Young, Austin Aries, and The Wolves. The following week, MVP and his associates beat up Bully Ray, but the Wolves, Aries and Young made the save, which set a six-man tag that was won by Team MVP. Later on the show, MVP booked Bully against Young with EC3 as the special referee, which ended in a no contest when Bully kicked him in the face. MVP, Lashley and King beat them down until Samoa Joe returned and made the save. On the June 5 episode of Impact Wrestling, Bully, Young, Aries and Joe defeated MVP, Lashley, King and EC3 in an eight-man tag team First Blood match. As Aries and Joe had been among MVP's harshest critics, they were put in matches against MVP associates King and Lashley respectively in singles matches at the PPV. MVP was later injured and not able to compete at the PPV. TNA announced on their website Friday before the PPV, that the match will now be a three-way cage match for the title, with the winners of Samoa Joe vs. Lashley and Austin Aries vs. Kenny King qualifying for the match. According to PWInsider, the original plans were to crown MVP as champion.

On May 29, TNA announced on their website that Texas wrestling legend Kevin Von Erich would accompany his two sons Marshall and Ross for their first ever nationally televised match at the pay-per-view.

On June 8, TNA announced on their website that they will reveal their third inductee into the TNA Hall of Fame and Kurt Angle will make the announcement. The inductees were later revealed to be Team 3D (Devon and Bully Ray)

On June 11, TNA announced on their website that Slammiversary opening match will be a six-man Ladder match for the TNA X Division Championship. The participants are X Division Champion Sanada, Manik, Tigre Uno, Crazzy Steve, and TNA World Tag Team Champions Eddie Edwards and Davey Richards.

On the June 12 episode of Impact Wrestling, Gail Kim defeated Madison Rayne and Brittany to become the new #1 contender, setting up a match between her and Angelina Love at Slammiversary for the TNA Knockouts Championship.

== Results ==
No.	Results	Stipulations	Times
1	Sanada (c) defeated Manik, Tigre Uno, Davey Richards, Eddie Edwards and Crazzy Steve (with Knux, Rebel and The Freak)	Ladder match for the TNA X Division Championship	09:41
2	Lashley defeated Samoa Joe	Singles match to qualify for TNA World Heavyweight Championship match later in the night	08:54
3	Magnus (with Bram) defeated Willow (with Abyss)	Singles match	10:01
4	Austin Aries defeated Kenny King	Singles match to qualify for TNA World Heavyweight Championship match later in the night	10:01
5	The Von Erichs (Marshall and Ross Von Erich) (with Kevin Von Erich) defeated The BroMans (Jessie Godderz and DJ Z) by disqualification	Tag team match	05:13
6	Angelina Love (c) (with Velvet Sky) defeated Gail Kim	Singles match for the TNA Knockouts Championship	06:43
7	Ethan Carter III (with Rockstar Spud and Dixie Carter) defeated Bully Ray	Texas Death match	17:12
8	Mr. Anderson defeated James Storm	Singles match	05:30
9	Eric Young (c) defeated Lashley and Austin Aries	Steel Cage match for the TNA World Heavyweight Championship	12:11
(c) / – the champion(s) heading into the match

== See also ==
- 2014 in professional wrestling
