= NTV G+ =

- Type: Cable television network
- Country: Japan
- Headquarters: Minato, Tokyo

Programming
- Language: Japanese
- Picture format: HDTV 1080i

Ownership
- Owner: CS Nippon Corporation

History
- Launched: 1 March 2002; 24 years ago

Links
- Website: www.gtasu.com (in Japanese)

NTV G+ (日テレジータス, Nittere Jītasu) is a Japanese sports channel owned by CS Nippon, a subsidiary of Nippon Television Holdings. The channel airs Yomiuri Giants baseball, martial arts, soccer, racing and other sports. As of February 2022, the channel was available in 7.5 million households.

== History and overview ==
The channel started broadcasting on March 1, 2002 on cable television, initially under the name G+ SPORTS & NEWS. Since the beginning, the channel televised all Yomiuri Giants games including pre- and post-game programs (Play Ball and Shiai Shuryo) By December 2006, the channel was carrying games in their entirety, unlike terrestrial television. G+ also implied the downfall of baseball on terrestrial outlets, after Fuji TV announced in July 2006 that it would stop airing Yomiuri Giants road games.

From April 1, 2022, new subscribers of SKY PerfecTV! who would watch the channel, had to do it by subscribing CS Nippon's three-channel bundle (NTV G+, NTV News24 and NTV Plus).
