= Maximum Capacity =

American professional wrestler (1968–2014)

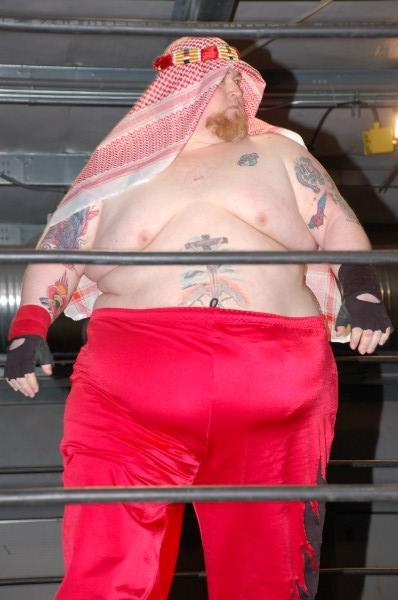

Personal information
- Born: Michael Stanco; August 2, 1968 Newark, New Jersey, United States
- Died: August 21, 2014 (aged 46) Sunrise, Florida U.S.

Professional wrestling career
- Ring name(s): Maximum Capacity; Max Capacity; Monster MAX; Cobra; The World's Largest Athlete
- Billed height: 6 ft 1 in (1.85 m)
- Billed weight: 650 lb (290 kg)
- Billed from: Dania Beach, Florida
- Trained by: Rusty Brooks; Billy Fives; Flex Magnum
- Debut: September 2000
- Retired: January 28, 2012

Michael Stanco (August 2, 1968 – August 21, 2014) was an American professional wrestler, better known by his ring name Maximum Capacity, and is billed in many independent promotions as the "World's Largest Athlete".

== Wrestling career ==
Born in Newark, New Jersey, Stanco trained at the School Of Hard Knocks under former WWF preliminary wrestler Rusty Brooks. Billy Fives also played a large role in training Max. He taught him many of grappling and submission moves that Fives was famous for in Japan. Stanco worked as a bodyguard and bouncer at several South Florida's nightclubs, leaving after a dangerous bar incident to take up wrestling.

Capacity began working for Future of Wrestling in January 2001. He quickly became their number one heel. During his time in FOW, Max faced the likes of Jerry "The King" Lawler, Barry Horowitz and Hacksaw Jim Duggan. Max was defeated for the FOW Hardcore Title by Horowitz in 2002.

Max worked against Chris Raaber for the EWA World Heavyweight Championship in Leoben, Austria in November 2003.

After taking 2½ years off due to injuries, Capacity returned to the ring for Pro Wrestling ZERO1-MAX in Japan in October 2006. He did a 10 match tour throughout Japan. During this tour he faced the likes of Masato Tanaka, Shinjiro Otani and Takao Omori.

After his return to the United States, Max began working for D1PW in Davie, Florida. D1PW has thus since begun an invasion angle with a North Carolina–based company called WCEW. Maximum Capacity defeated Tommy Vandal on July 21, 2007, for their Extreme Title.

Max just completed another overseas tour. Wrestling in Tuggen, Switzerland on May 23, 2009, vs Jamie Gardner for the WWPW Heavyweight title.

Max was diagnosed with Colorectal Cancer on December 29, 2011, and was forced to retire against his wishes. He worked his final retirement match for Frank Goodman's PWX promotion at PWX-A Wrestling Odyssey in Orlando, FL on January 28, 2012. Although he fought hard to battle his illness and make one final return to the ring, his cancer continued to worsen, making any return impossible.

== TV and movie career ==
Maximum Capacity was featured on an episode of The Jerry Springer Show in 2001 called "3 Pigs and A Trailer". Max has also appeared on numerous TV wrestling shows throughout Europe, Asia and America. Max has also appeared on German TV station RTL, when they did a featured story on him in 2003 when he wrestled in Austria.

Max made his feature film debut in 2009's Death Print.

Max was involved in the Celebrity Boxing 25 show at the Hard Rock Casino Passions nightclub where Jose Canseco sent his brother Ozzie instead. Max wrestled the opening match vs. Jordan Rayner on March 26, 2011.

== Death ==
After a nearly 3-year battle with colorectal cancer, Max was admitted to the hospital on August 19, 2014, and succumbed to his illness on August 21, 2014, in Sunrise, Florida.

== Championships and accomplishments ==
- Future of Wrestling

- FOW Hardcore Championship (1 time)

- World Class Extreme Wrestling

- WCEW Extreme Championship (1 time)

== See also ==
- List of premature professional wrestling deaths
