= Kaisen: Outbreak =

2014 professional wrestling event

- Promotional poster featuring all Wrestle-1 affiliated workers
- Promotion(s): Total Nonstop Action Wrestling; Wrestle-1
- Date: March 2, 2014
- City: Sumida, Tokyo, Japan
- Venue: Ryōgoku Kokugikan
- Attendance: 5,800

Pay-per-view chronology
← Previous; First	Next → Shōgeki: Impact

Kaisen: Outbreak (開戦～Outbreak～) was a professional wrestling event produced by the Wrestle-1 promotion (W-1), that took place on March 2, 2014, at Ryōgoku Kokugikan in Tokyo, Japan. For the event – W-1's first at Ryōgoku Kokugikan – the promotion collaborated with American promotion Total Nonstop Action Wrestling (TNA), the first of two W-1/TNA joint events in 2014 (along with Bound for Glory).

The event was split into two parts; part one included four matches featuring exclusively Japanese wrestlers, and part two featured eight matches involving wrestlers from TNA. All in all, 14 wrestlers from TNA took part in the event, which featured three title matches, contested for the TNA World Heavyweight, TNA X Division and TNA World Tag Team Championships.

The event saw two titles change hands; in the first The BroMans (Jessie Godderz and Robbie E) captured the TNA World Tag Team Championship in a three-way match involving the defending champions The Wolves (Davey Richards and Eddie Edwards) and W-1's Team 246 (Kaz Hayashi and Shuji Kondo). In the second W-1's Seiya Sanada captured the TNA X Division Championship from Austin Aries. The main event saw Magnus successfully defend the TNA World Heavyweight Championship against W-1's Kai.

The event aired live in Japan on the NTV G+ channel. TNA would later in the year air the second half of the event as a One Night Only pay-per-view titled Global Impact Japan.

== Background ==
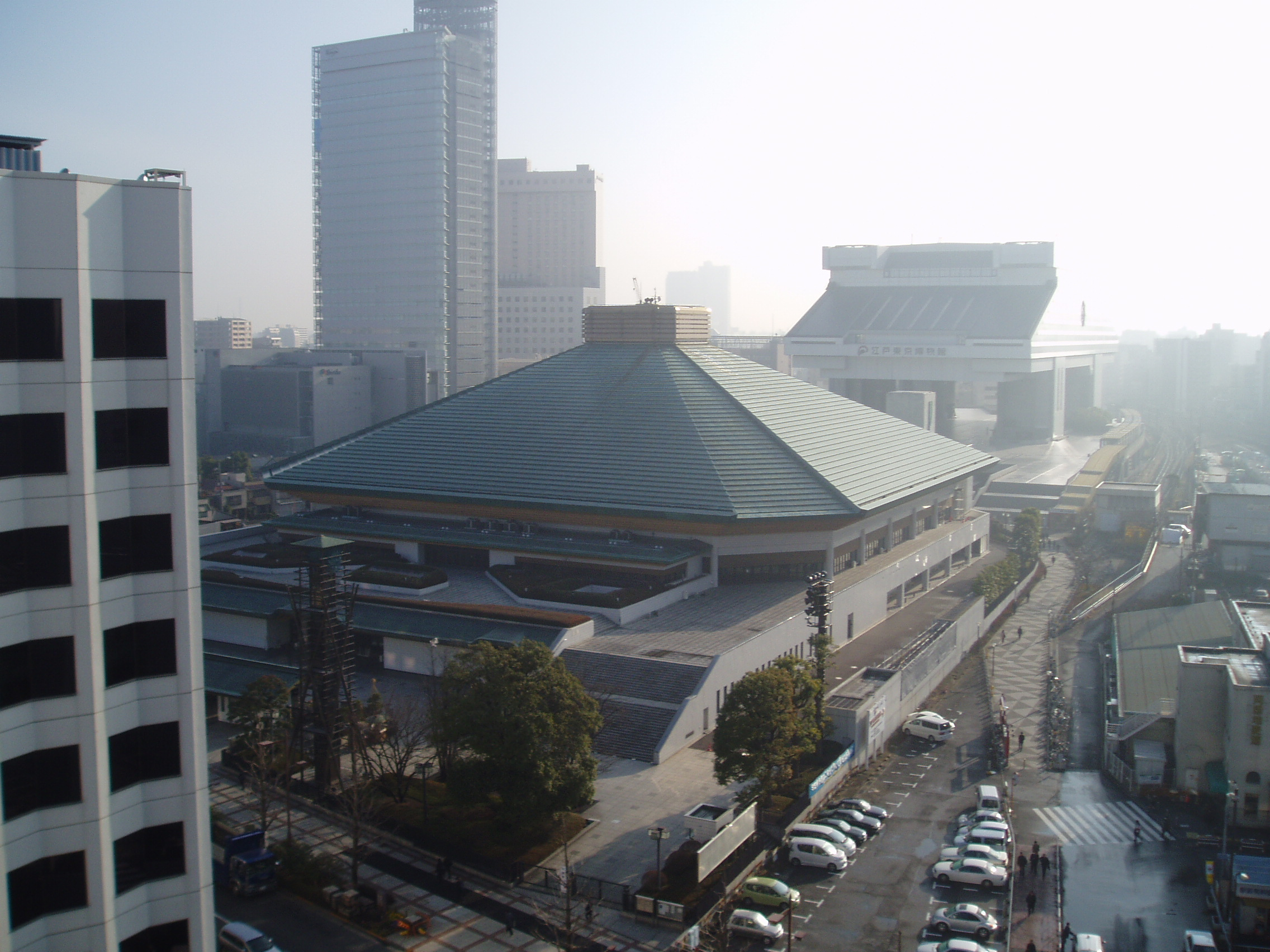
Tokyo's Ryōgoku Kokugikan, where the event was held

Kaisen: Outbreak featured twelve professional wrestling matches involving different wrestlers from pre-existing scripted feuds, plots, and storylines that played out on Wrestle-1's house shows, as well as several cross-promotional matches with American promotion Total Nonstop Action Wrestling (TNA). Wrestlers portray villains or heroes as they follow a series of events that build tension, and culminate in a wrestling match or series of matches. All storyline developments for Kaisen: Outbreak took place at events held by Wrestle-1.

After founding Wrestle-1 in July 2013, Keiji Mutoh quickly established a working relationship with TNA, visiting Jeff Jarrett at the promotion's offices in Nashville, Tennessee before the end of the month. Jarrett ended up working a Wrestle-1 event on October 6, which was followed by A.J. Styles coming in to defend the TNA World Heavyweight Championship on November 16, and Jay Bradley and Rob Terry working a tour with the promotion starting November 16. While Bradley left Wrestle-1 to return to TNA following December 1, which was shortly afterwards followed by the American promotion releasing him from his contract, Terry remained with Wrestle-1 for the next few months. Following Jarrett's departure from TNA, the relationship was handled by Bob Ryder and John Gaburick on the Americans' side.

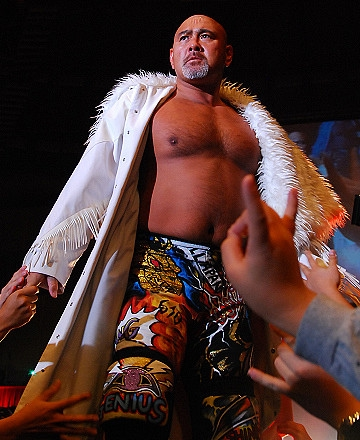
Wrestle-1 founder, owner, and wrestler Keiji Mutoh

On November 16, 2013, Wrestle-1 announced its first ever event at Tokyo's Ryōgoku Kokugikan, to be held on March 2, 2014. On January 30, 2014, the promotion announced that the event would feature a "Wrestle-1 vs. TNA" theme with eleven wrestlers coming in to represent the American promotion. The event would be broadcast live in Japan on the NTV G+ channel and later by TNA on pay-per-view as part of its One Night Only series. The following day Wrestle-1 added that the event, titled Kaisen: Outbreak ("Kaisen" being Japanese for "outbreak of war"), would feature matches for the TNA World Heavyweight, TNA X Division and TNA World Tag Team Championships. It was however noted by American reporters that the original list of TNA wrestlers announced for the event did not include the reigning TNA World Tag Team Champions, The BroMans (Jessie Godderz and Robbie E). This was later changed by Wrestle-1, who began advertising the two for the event. It was also reported that Jeff Jarrett was originally booked for Kaisen: Outbreak and even though he would have wrestled in a match not involving TNA wrestlers, his booking was canceled by Wrestle-1 following pressure from TNA. As part of the relationship between Wrestle-1 and TNA, Mutoh, using his Great Muta persona, and his protégé Seiya Sanada were announced for TNA's March 9 Lockdown event.

On January 31, 2014, Wrestle-1's on-screen matchmaker Manabu Soya announced matches to determine the challengers for each TNA title. Soya first announced a battle royal to determine the X Division Championship challenger and then a single tag team match to determine the TNA World Tag Team Championship challenger. Finally, Soya announced that Yasufumi Nakanoue, Masakatsu Funaki, Minoru Tanaka and Seiya Sanada would enter a four-man tournament to determine the number one contender to the TNA World Heavyweight Championship. This was part of a storyline, where Soya was favoring his old tag team partner Seiya Sanada, while making disparaging comments about Kai, who had been battling Sanada for the role of Wrestle-1's "ace" or top wrestler. Kai instantly confronted Soya on being left out of the tournament, which led to Sanada announcing that since he had already unsuccessfully challenged A.J. Styles for the TNA World Heavyweight Championship during his Wrestle-1 visit, he instead wanted to go for the TNA X Division Championship and offered his spot in the four-man tournament to Kai, which was finally accepted by Soya. Meanwhile, Team 246 (Kaz Hayashi and Shuji Kondo) nominated themselves as one of the teams to battle for the shot at the TNA World Tag Team Championship, but were interrupted by the villainous Desperado stable, who made their own nomination. This led to Soya announcing a match between Team 246 and any two members of Desperado, where the winning team would get the title shot on March 2.

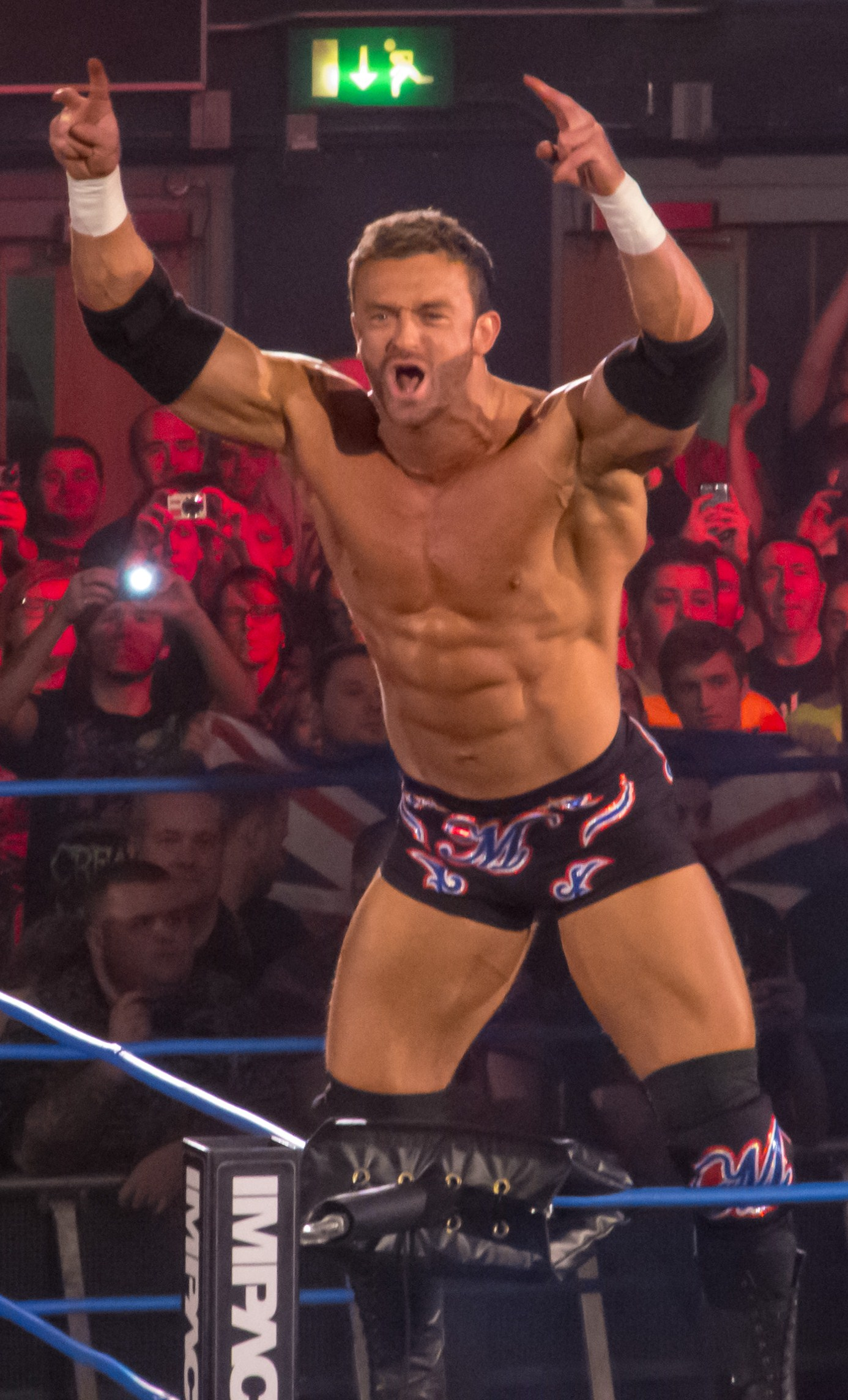
Magnus, the reigning TNA World Heavyweight Champion heading into Kaisen: Outbreak

All of the decision matches took place at Wrestle-1's February 15 event. First up was the match to determine the challenger for the TNA World Tag Team Championship, which was won by Team 246, who defeated Desperado representatives Kazma Sakamoto and Masayuki Kono. Next up was a twenty-man "extreme" battle royal for the shot at the TNA X Division Championship, held by Austin Aries. Seiya Sanada ended up winning the match by scoring the last elimination over Yoshihiro Takayama, following help from Manabu Soya, who returned from a shoulder injury to take part in the match. The first round of the tournament to determine the TNA World Heavyweight Championship challenger saw Masakatsu Funaki defeat Yasufumi Nakanoue and Kai end his recent losing streak and pick up his first win in 2014 by defeating Minoru Tanaka, in the process avenging a loss suffered the previous month. The finals of the tournament saw Kai avenge another loss by defeating Funaki to earn his shot at the title, held by Magnus. On February 23, at a TNA house show in Morgantown, West Virginia, The Wolves (Davey Richards and Eddie Edwards) captured the TNA World Tag Team Championship from The BroMans, changing Team 246's opponents for Kaisen: Outbreak. The Wolves had been advertised as taking part in Kaisen: Outbreak from the start, while The BroMans had not been.

On February 20, Wrestle-1 announced the first non-title matches for Kaisen: Outbreak, which would see Masakatsu Funaki face Bobby Roode and the Junior Stars (Koji Kanemoto and Minoru Tanaka) face Bad Influence (Christopher Daniels and Kazarian). Five days later matches, where TNA wrestler Abyss would face freelancer Yoshihiro Takayama and an all-TNA women's match, where Gail Kim would face Madison Rayne, were also announced for the event. The women's match continued a trend, where Wrestle-1, though not having any female wrestlers under contract, had held one women's match per event, using wrestlers from various joshi promotions. Also announced was the first match to not involve any TNA wrestlers as Yasufumi Nakanoue was announced as taking on New Japan Pro-Wrestling (NJPW) representative and reigning NWA World Heavyweight Champion Satoshi Kojima. The following day it was clarified that Kaisen: Outbreak would be split into two parts with the first involving only Japanese wrestlers and the second involving the TNA wrestlers. The match between Nakanoue and Kojima was the only one announced for the first half beforehand. Meanwhile, the TNA half of the card was completed with the addition of a six-man tag team match, where Keiji Mutoh, Rob Terry, who had remained with Wrestle-1 since the past November, and a mystery partner were set to take on TNA wrestler Samoa Joe and Desperado representatives Masayuki Kono and René Duprée. Mutoh promised to retire from professional wrestling if he was defeated in the match. At a press conference held the day before the event, former TNA World Tag Team Champions, The Bromans, barged in to demand their rematch for the title. This was accepted by Mutoh, who agreed to change the TNA World Tag Team Championship match into a three-way match.

Days before the event, the advance ticket sales were described as "very poor" with heavy papering expected from Wrestle-1's side.

== Event ==
=== Part 1 ===
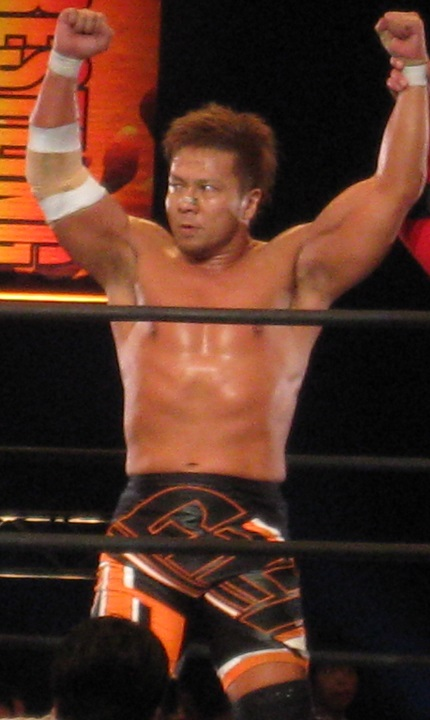
Satoshi Kojima, who made his second Wrestle-1 appearance during part one of Kaisen: Outbreak

Kaisen: Outbreak opened with the half containing matches with only Japanese wrestlers. The opening match was a six-man tag team match, where the "Japanese Million Dollar Man" Kazushi Miyamoto teamed with Tokyo Gurentai representatives Mazada and Nosawa Rongai to take on Andy Wu, Daiki Inaba and Hiroshi Yamato, who were accompanied by Pan'nyan, a man in a panda/cat hybrid costume. The storyline rivalry between Tokyo Gurentai and Wrestle-1's rookies, led by Yamato, had been going on since the promotion's first event. In late 2013, Yamato had tried to switch sides in the rivalry and join Tokyo Gurentai, but after being turned down, he returned to leading the Wrestle-1 rookies on January 31, 2014. Towards the end of the match, Yamato was in control of the match against Miyamoto, when Inaba surprised his partner by blind tagging himself into the match. Miyamoto then hit Inaba with a lariat and pinned him for the win with the Million Dollar Driver.

The second match of the event was a short comedy match between Ryota Hama and freelancer Kikutaro, which Hama won with the Hamaketsu. Post-match, Kikutaro showed respect to Hama, but the two were interrupted and insulted by Desperado representatives Kazma Sakamoto and Ryoji Sai.

In the third match, Sakamoto and Sai took on Manabu Soya and Seiki Yoshioka in a tag team match. Towards the end of the match, Yoshioka dove out of the ring onto Sai, while Soya hit Sakamoto with the Wild Bomber and then pinned him for the win.

The fourth and final match of part one saw Yasufumi Nakanoue take on NJPW's Satoshi Kojima, who entered the arena carrying his NWA World Heavyweight Championship belt. In the finish of the match, Nakanoue removed his elbow pad and was setting up his elbow strike finishing move, but was surprised by Kojima hitting him with his own finishing move, the lariat, for the win. Post-match, Kojima shook hands with Nakanoue.

During the intermission, Wrestle-1 announced events for May 4 at the Tokyo Dome City Hall and July 6 back in Ryōgoku Kokugikan. This was followed by Desperado, accompanied by Samoa Joe, coming to the ring. The stable's leader Masayuki Kono downplayed Keiji Mutoh and Rob Terry's mystery partner and promised to retire Mutoh later in the event.

=== Part 2 ===
The second half of the event kicked off with a tag team match, where the Junior Stars (Koji Kanemoto and Minoru Tanaka) took on Bad Influence (Christopher Daniels and Kazarian). Towards the end of the match, the Junior Stars had the match won, when Tanaka hit Daniels with the Fireball Splash, but Kazarian prevented the referee of the match from making a three count. Tanaka then locked Daniels in the Minoru Special, while Kanemoto held Kazarian in an ankle hold. The TNA duo, however, managed to get out of the holds and hit Tanaka with the Bad Elimination for the win.

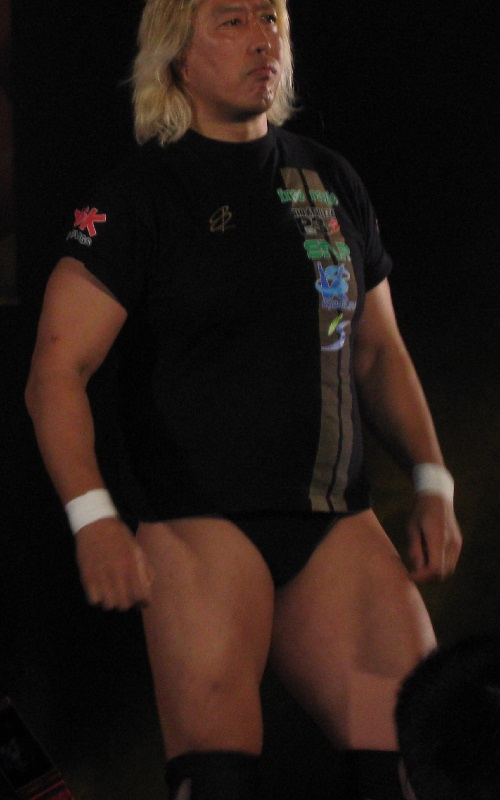
Yoshihiro Takayama, whose match with Abyss ended in a draw

The sixth match of the event was a women's match between Gail Kim and TNA Knockouts Champion Madison Rayne. Kim won the match by pinning Rayne following the Eat Defeat.

The seventh match saw Yoshihiro Takayama take on Abyss in a wild brawl. The storyline before the match was that backstage Mazada and Nosawa Rongai warned Takayama that Abyss was going to be bringing his signature bag of thumbtacks to the ring with him and suggested that he took a weapon of his own or something to cover himself up with him. Takayama, however, refused the suggestion. In the finish of the match, Abyss emptied his bag on the entrance ramp and then body slammed Takayama onto the thumbtacks. Takayama, however, recovered and began exchanging punches with Abyss. Having lost control of the match, the referee decided to disqualify both Abyss and Takayama, ending the match in a draw. Post-match, the two men brawled backstage.

In the eighth match of the event Masakatsu Funaki took on Bobby Roode. Towards the end of the match Funaki got out of Roode's fireman's carry and locked him in an ankle hold, which he had also used earlier in the match, which resulted in Roode submitting and giving Funaki the win. Following the match, Funaki challenged TNA wrestler Kurt Angle, who was not present at the event, to a future match.

The ninth match of the event was a six-man tag team match between the team of Masayuki Kono, René Duprée and Samoa Joe and Keiji Mutoh, Rob Terry and their mystery partner, who was revealed as Mutoh's old tag team partner Taiyō Kea. The match featured constant cheating from Desperado's side, including outside interference from Kazma Sakamoto and Ryoji Sai. In the finish of the match, Joe turned on his own partners, taking a steel chair away from Duprée, while Terry took Sakamoto and Sai out with a double lariat. Kea then hit Duprée with the TKO, which was followed by Mutoh pinning him for the win with the Shining Wizard.

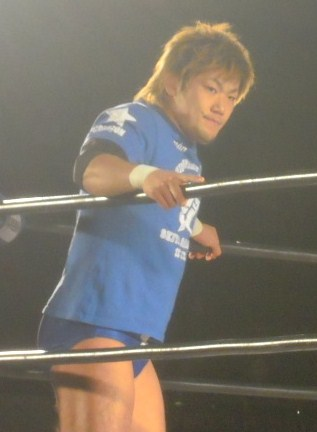
Seiya Sanada, who was crowned the new TNA X Division Champion during the event

The tenth match was the first title match of the event and saw The Wolves (Davey Richards and Eddie Edwards) defend the TNA World Tag Team Championship in a three-way match against previous champions The BroMans (Jessie Godderz and Robbie E) and Team 246 (Kaz Hayashi and Shuji Kondo). Towards the end of the match, The Wolves were in control, hitting Hayashi with a double-team double knee backbreaker and Kondo with the Alarm Clock. However, before The Wolves could pin either one of Team 246 for the win, The BroMans returned to the ring, hit Hayashi with the Bro Down and pinned him to win the match and regain the TNA World Tag Team Championship. In a post-match interview, Team 246 and The Wolves agreed to a rematch in the United States.

In the eleventh match of the event, Austin Aries defended the TNA X Division Championship against Seiya Sanada. In the end, Sanada avoided two of Aries' finishing moves, the Last Chancery and the 450° splash and then hit him with a series of a German suplex, a dragon suplex and a tiger suplex, before climbing to the top rope, hitting a moonsault and pinning Aries to win the match and become the new TNA X Division Champion. Following the match, Aries raised Sanada's hand in the air.

The main event saw Magnus defend the TNA World Heavyweight Championship against Kai. The match ended with a sequence, where the two wrestlers exchanged finishing moves, with Kai surviving the Magnus Driver and the diving elbow drop and Magnus the Kai Clutch. Magnus then hit Kai with a lariat, before dropping him with another Magnus Driver and then pinning with the diving elbow drop to win the match and retain the TNA World Heavyweight Championship.

== Aftermath ==
The day after Kaisen: Outbreak, Wrestle-1 announced that following Lockdown, Seiya Sanada would remain in TNA indefinitely. On March 6, TNA announced that Yasufumi Nakanoue would also be taking part in Lockdown. At the pay-per-view on March 9, The Great Muta, Sanada, working under just his family name, and Nakanoue, working as Yasu, defeated Chris Sabin, Christopher Daniels and Kazarian in a six-man tag team steel cage match with Sanada pinning Daniels following a moonsault. Though now a regular for TNA, Sanada also made special one-night returns to Wrestle-1, successfully defending the X Division Championship against Seiki Yoshioka on March 22 and Christopher Daniels on April 17. Kaisen: Outbreak led to an escalation in the storyline rivalry between Kai and Manabu Soya, who, in light of the results of the last two matches, felt he had been vindicated in his view of Sanada as the Wrestle-1 ace and began taunting Kai as a "fake ace". The rivalry culminated on May 4, when Kai defeated Soya, who, as a result, lost his job as the matchmaker of Wrestle-1. TNA's One Night Only broadcast of the second half of Kaisen: Outbreak was named "Global Impact Japan" with a premiere on July 4. A second W-1/TNA joint event, Bound for Glory, took place on October 12 at Tokyo's Korakuen Hall. The event, produced by TNA, featured eleven wrestlers from Wrestle-1.

== Results ==
No.	Results	Stipulations	Times
1	Kazushi Miyamoto and Tokyo Gurentai (Mazada and Nosawa Rongai) defeated Andy Wu, Daiki Inaba and Hiroshi Yamato (with Pan'nyan)	Six-man tag team match	03:38
2	Ryota Hama defeated Kikutaro	Singles match	02:32
3	Manabu Soya and Seiki Yoshioka defeated Desperado (Kazma Sakamoto and Ryoji Sai)	Tag team match	06:10
4	Satoshi Kojima defeated Yasufumi Nakanoue	Singles match	09:04
5	Bad Influence (Christopher Daniels and Kazarian) defeated Junior Stars (Koji Kanemoto and Minoru Tanaka)	Tag team match	10:43
6	Gail Kim defeated Madison Rayne	Singles match	05:26
7	Abyss vs. Yoshihiro Takayama ended in a draw	Singles match	06:45
8	Masakatsu Funaki defeated Bobby Roode by submission	Singles match	11:27
9	Keiji Mutoh, Rob Terry and Taiyō Kea defeated Desperado (Masayuki Kono and René Duprée) (with Kazma Sakamoto and Ryoji Sai) and Samoa Joe	Six-man tag team match	13:34
10	The BroMans (Jessie Godderz and Robbie E) defeated The Wolves (Davey Richards and Eddie Edwards) (c) and Team 246 (Kaz Hayashi and Shuji Kondo)	Three-way tag team match for the TNA World Tag Team Championship	12:45
11	Seiya Sanada defeated Austin Aries (c)	Singles match for the TNA X Division Championship	17:40
12	Magnus (c) defeated Kai	Singles match for the TNA World Heavyweight Championship	14:37
(c) / – the champion(s) heading into the match
