= The Revolution (TNA) =

Professional wrestling stable

Statistics
- Leader: James Storm
- Members: The Great Sanada; Manik; Abyss; Khoya; Serena Deeb
- Name: The Revolution
- Billed heights: James Storm: 6 ft 0 in (1.83 m); The Great Sanada: 5 ft 11 in (1.80 m); Manik: 5 ft 10 in (1.78 m); Abyss: 6 ft 8 in (2.03 m); Khoya: 6 ft 4 in (1.93 m); Serena Deeb: 5 ft 4 in (1.63 m)
- Combined billed weight: 1,342 lb (609 kg)
- Debut: July 24, 2014
- Disbanded: September 23, 2015
- Years active: 2014–2015

The Revolution was a villainous stable in Total Nonstop Action Wrestling (TNA), consisting of members James Storm, Abyss, The Great Sanada, Khoya, Manik and Serena Deeb.

== History ==
=== Total Nonstop Action Wrestling (2014–2015) ===
==== Formation ====
In June 2014, James Storm would begin a program where he would confront and verbally run down Sanada. Following Sanada's loss of the TNA X Division Championship to Austin Aries, Storm would confront Sanada backstage, berating Sanada's mentor The Great Muta, while slapping him in the face as a way to break Sanada down. On the July 24 episode of Impact Wrestling, Storm would confront The Great Muta, calling him a fraud, and proclaim himself to be "the Legend." After spitting beer in Muta's face, Sanada would run Storm out of the ring, before attacking Muta himself with a steel chair and bowing to Storm, revealing an unknown alliance between them.

The following week on Impact Wrestling, Storm would proclaim himself as Sanada's new mentor and master. Over the following weeks, TNA would air vignettes of Storm having a cult-like hold over Sanada, portraying Storm having him tied up, break Sanada down physically and mentally, and proclaim that "The Revolution is coming." On the August 27 episode of Impact Wrestling, Sanada accompanied by Storm debuted the new ring name The Great Sanada (debuting a look inspired by The Great Muta) before defeating Austin Aries with help from Storm.

On the September 3 episode of Impact Wrestling, Storm and Sanada abducted former X Division Champion Manik following his loss in a six-man #1 contenders match for the X Division Championship. On the following episode of Impact Wrestling, Storm was shown initiating Manik, much like he did Sanada into his new faction. On the September 17 episode of Impact Wrestling, Storm and Sanada attacked X Division Champion Samoa Joe, and were joined by Manik, now sporting an all new look, joining Storm's group. On the October 8 episode of Impact Wrestling, it was announced that Storm and Sanada would battle The Great Muta and Tajiri in the main event of Bound for Glory. This marked Storm's first appearance in the Bound for Glory main event, as well as the first time in the company's history that the main event was not contested for the TNA World Heavyweight Championship. At Bound for Glory on October 12, Storm and Sanada were defeated by The Great Muta and Tajiri. After the match, Manik joined in attacking Muta until Team 3D made the save.

==== TNA World Tag Team Champions and various feuds ====
Following Bound for Glory, the stable, now known as "The Revolution", began to recruit members of the TNA roster, beginning with one half of the TNA World Tag Team Champions Davey Richards. After teasing tension between Richards and his partner Eddie Edwards, The Revolution demanded Richards' decision on the November 12 episode of Impact Wrestling. When Richards turned down the Revolution's offer to join, they attacked Richards and Edwards, leaving them vulnerable for Storm to bring out his Feast or Fired briefcase, guaranteeing him a TNA World Tag Team Championship opportunity.

Storm revealed Abyss as his partner, and the newest pledge to The Revolution. They defeated The Wolves for the TNA World Tag Team Championships, making Storm a record six-time champion. After the match, Manik attempted to introduce Mahabali Shera to James Storm before Storm demanded Manik to send Shera away. Shera was later seen in a vignette towards the end of 2014 beginning his initiation into The Revolution. On the January 7, 2015 episode of Impact Wrestling, Shera was officially brought into The Revolution and given the new name "Khoya."

On the January 30 episode of Impact Wrestling, The Revolution lost the championship against The Wolves. Storm began a secondary angle on the April 3 episode of Impact Wrestling, when he seemingly broke character and confronted Bram when he attempted to attack Mickie James with a steel chair during Bram's match against Magnus. Magnus and James confronted Storm after the match, to which Storm replied he was merely looking out for an old friend, hinting he was still a villain.

On the April 10 episode of Impact Wrestling, Storm dismissed Sanada from The Revolution, stating that Sanada had let him down one too many times. Sanada's departure from TNA was confirmed by the promotion on April 16.

==== Dissolution ====
On the April 24 episode of Impact Wrestling, Storm convinced James to avoid immediate retirement, encouraging the fans to cheer and chant for "one more match," to which Mickie James agreed, to Magnus' dismay. On subsequent episodes, Storm continued to annoy Magnus by constantly fawning over Mickie. Magnus eventually became furious and broke a guitar over Storm's head. On the July 22 episode of Impact Wrestling, Storm revealed the new member of The Revolution, Serena Deeb. The following week on Impact Wrestling, Storm and Serena were defeated by Magnus and James, thus ending the feud. A week later on Impact Wrestling, Storm attacked Khoya after having failed him over and over. During next weeks, Storm, Abyss and Manik would continue to attack Khoya.

On September 23, Abyss and Manik quit The Revolution, effectively disbanding the stable. The following day, James Storm announced his departure from TNA.

=== Independent circuit (2014–2015) ===
On December 13, 2014 at WWL Navidad Corportiva, Abyss and James Storm unsuccessfully challenged Thunder and Lightning for WWL World Tag Team Championship.

== Members ==
Name	Tenure
James Storm (leader)	July 24, 2014 – September 23, 2015
The Great Sanada	July 24, 2014 – April 10, 2015
Manik	September 3, 2014 – September 23, 2015
Abyss	November 12, 2014 – September 23, 2015
Khoya	January 7, 2015 – August 5, 2015
Serena Deeb	July 22, 2015 – July 29, 2015

== Championships and accomplishments ==
- Total Nonstop Action Wrestling
  - TNA World Tag Team Championship (1 time) – Abyss and Storm
  - Global Impact Tournament (2015) – The Great Sanada and Khoya with Team International (Angelina Love, Bram, Drew Galloway, The Great Muta, Magnus, Rockstar Spud, Magnus, Sonjay Dutt and Tigre Uno)
