= Roppongi Vice =

Professional wrestling tag team

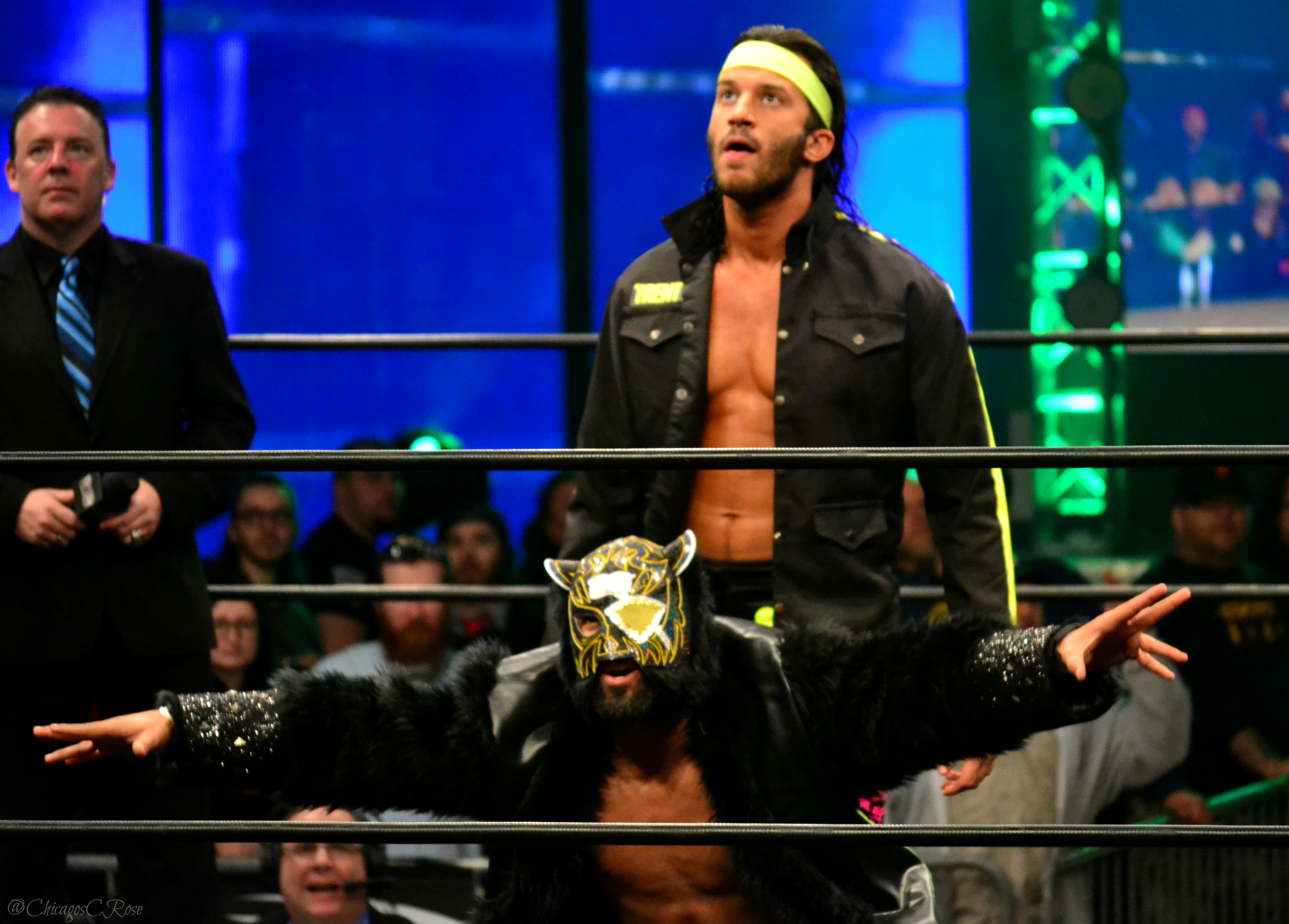
- Roppongi Vice in February 2016

Tag team
- Name(s): Roppongi Vice; RPG Vice
- Members: Trent Beretta/Beretta; Rocky Romero
- Billed heights: Beretta: 6 ft 1 in (1.85 m); Romero: 5 ft 8 in (1.73 m)
- Combined billed weight: 366 lb (166 kg)
- Debut: March 13, 2015
- Years active: 2015–2017; 2022–present

Roppongi Vice (sometimes stylized as RPG Vice) are a professional wrestling tag team consisting of Trent Beretta and Rocky Romero. They are signed to All Elite Wrestling (AEW), where they are a sub-group of the Don Callis Family. They have also performed in Ring of Honor (ROH) and New Japan Pro-Wrestling (NJPW), where they are former four-time IWGP Junior Heavyweight Tag Team Champions.

== History ==
=== Ring of Honor (2015–2017) ===
Following the dissolution of Rocky Romero's previous tag team Forever Hooligans due to the retirement of his partner Alex Koslov, Romero announced during Ring of Honor's 13th Anniversary Show that he would be forming a new tag team known as Roppongi Vice alongside former WWE wrestler Trent Beretta, with the stated goal of challenging the then-current ROH World Tag Team Champions reDRagon for the title. In their debut on the ROH Conquest Tour, Roppongi Vice defeated The Decade on March 13, and the following day won an Instant Reward Proving Ground match against reDRagon, only to lose a subsequent match for the championship. At Global Wars '15, Roppongi Vice competed in a three-way match against The Addiction and The Decade on May 15, and in a six-man tag team match alongside Kazuchika Okada against Bullet Club representatives A.J. Styles and The Young Bucks on May 16, losing both matches. On July 24, Roppongi Vice were defeated by The Briscoes at Death Before Dishonor XIII. On March 14 of ROH TV tapings, they won a seven tag team gauntlet match to determine #1 contender for ROH World Tag Team Championship by defeating The Young Bucks after entering the match as the seventh team.

On March 10 at the 15th Anniversary Show Roppongi Vice was unsuccessful in a Las Vegas Street Fight against The Hardys, due to the involvement of The Young Bucks, for the ROH World Tag Team Championship.

=== New Japan Pro-Wrestling (2015–2017) ===
Roppongi Vice, representing the Chaos stable, made their New Japan Pro-Wrestling (NJPW) debut in late March on the Road to Invasion Attack 2015 tour, facing the Bullet Club in multiple-man tag matches. At Invasion Attack 2015 on April 5, Roppongi Vice defeated The Young Bucks for the IWGP Junior Heavyweight Tag Team Championship, but lost the title in a rematch the following month at Wrestling Dontaku 2015. At Dominion 7.5 in Osaka-jo Hall, Roppongi Vice received another shot at the championship in a three-way match that also included reDRagon, but failed to recapture the title. At Destruction in Kobe, immediately after reDRagon defended their titles, Roppongi would viciously assault them in order to attain a championship match at King of Pro-Wrestling where they would go on to lose by a questionable three-count. During the 2015 Super Jr. Tag Tournament, Vice achieved big wins over the likes of Jyushin Thunder Liger and Tiger Mask as well as the reigning champions; reDRagon. They were defeated in the finals of the tournament on November 7 at Power Struggle by Matt Sydal and Ricochet, but along with The Young Bucks, still challenged for the title after the match.

On April 10, 2016, at Invasion Attack 2016, Roppongi Vice defeated Sydal and Ricochet to win the IWGP Junior Heavyweight Tag Team Championship for the second time. They lost the title back to Sydal and Ricochet on May 3 at Wrestling Dontaku 2016. On October 21, Roppongi Vice entered the 2016 Super Jr. Tag Tournament that began on Road to Power Struggle event. They defeated the representatives of CMLL, Ángel de Oro and Titán, in the first round. After defeating Fuego and Ryusuke Taguchi in the semifinals on October 30, they won the tournament by defeating ACH and Taiji Ishimori in the finals on November 5 at Power Struggle. On January 4, 2017, at Wrestle Kingdom 11 in Tokyo Dome, Roppongi Vice defeated The Young Bucks to win the IWGP Junior Heavyweight Tag Team Championship for the third time. They lost the title to Suzuki-gun (Taichi and Yoshinobu Kanemaru) at NJPW's 45th anniversary show on March 6, before regaining it at Road to Wrestling Dontaku day 3 on April 27. They lost the title to The Young Bucks on June 11 at Dominion 6.11 in Osaka-jo Hall.

On July 2 at G1 Special in USA, Roppongi Vice unsuccessfully challenged The Young Bucks for the title in a rematch. Afterwards, Romero brought up a five-year plan he and Beretta had made three years earlier, which included them winning the IWGP Junior Heavyweight Tag Team Championship and the Super Jr. Tag Tournament, both of which they had already done, as well as Beretta's eventual transition into the heavyweight division. Having failed to regain the IWGP Junior Heavyweight Tag Team Championship, Romero gave Beretta his blessing to move to the heavyweight division, effectively disbanding Roppongi Vice. On August 21, NJPW announced that Roppongi Vice's final match together would take place on September 16 at Destruction in Hiroshima, where they defeated Bullet Club's Chase Owens and Yujiro Takahashi. Both Romero and Beretta remained members of Chaos, with each transitioning into a new role. Beretta moved into the heavyweight division, wrestling in singles competition and as a part of his long-standing tag team Best Friends with Chuckie T, while Romero became a manager for the new junior tag team Roppongi 3K.

=== All Elite Wrestling (2021–present) ===
==== Best Friends (2021–2024) ====
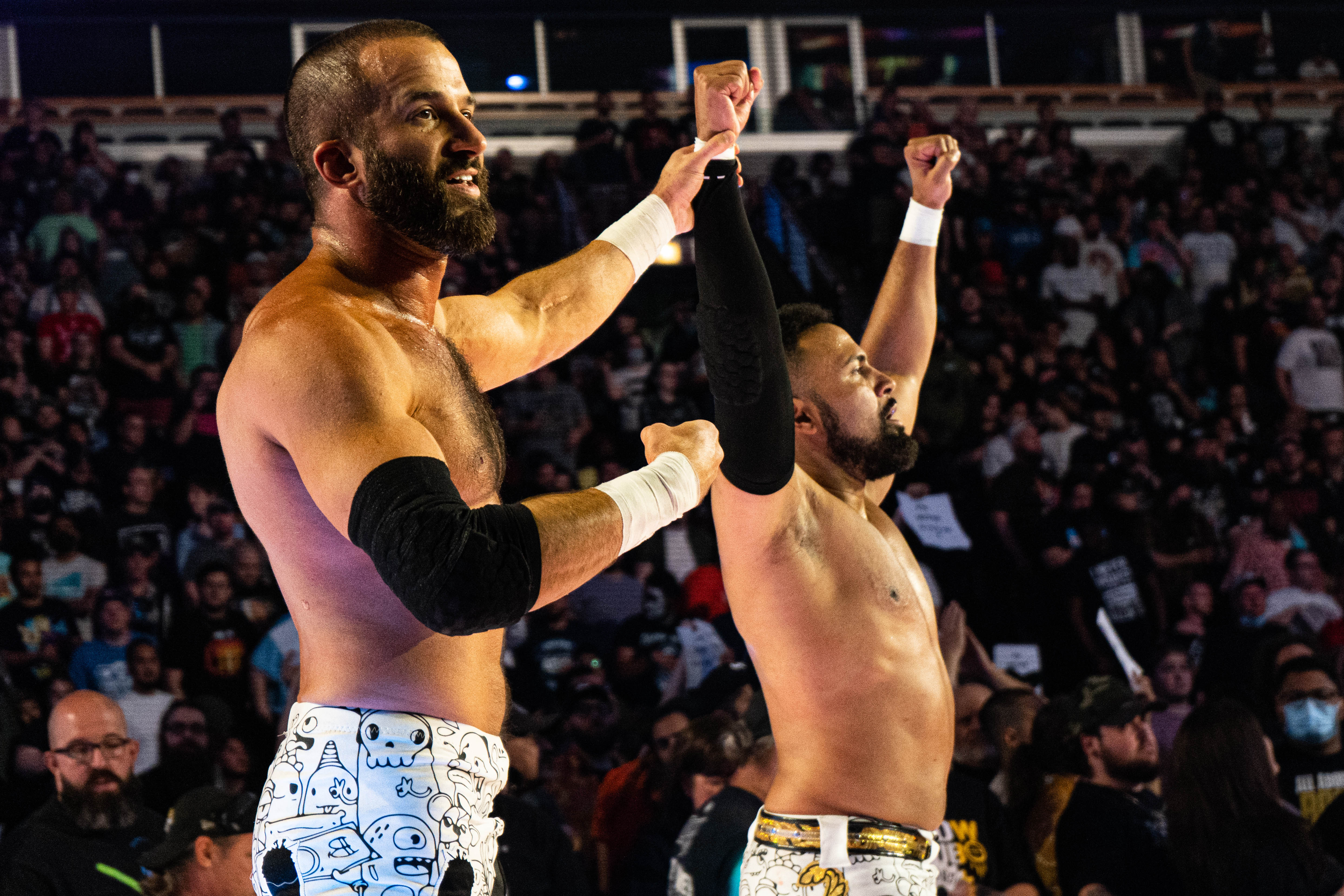
Roppongi Vice at Forbidden Door

On the May 24, 2021, episode of AEW Dark: Elevation, Beretta, along with Chuck Taylor and Orange Cassidy, saved Romero from an attack by Ryan Nemeth, Peter Avalon and Cezar Bononi, briefly reuniting Roppongi Vice as their theme music played and they embraced in the ring. Romero would return to AEW and on the December 8 episode of AEW Dynamite would team with Beretta's current tag team partner, Taylor, in a losing effort against The Young Bucks. After the match, The Young Bucks, along with Adam Cole assaulted the pair. Beretta made a surprise return, having been out following neck surgery, to come to their aid. After fighting off the assailants Romero, Beretta, Taylor, and the rest of the Best Friends stable celebrated in the ring while the Roppongi Vice theme music was played.

Beretta and Romero opened the February 11, 2022, episode of AEW Rampage with a match against the Young Bucks, in a losing effort. They reunited again for the March 28 episode of Elevation in a winning effort against The Factory. They would later appear on the May 18 episode of Dynamite. On the May 25 episode of Dynamite they faced off against FTR for the ROH World Tag Team Championship; however, the match ended in a no contest after a mid-match interruption by United Empire's Jeff Cobb and Great-O-Khan. This led to a triple-threat tag team Winner Takes All match between the three teams being scheduled at Forbidden Door for the ROH World Tag Team Championship, and Cobb and O-Khan's IWGP Tag Team Championship. At the event, the triple-threat tag team match was won by FTR. Since then, Roppongi Vice have been used sporadically on AEW programming in multi-man matches, including on the Zero Hour pre-shows of Full Gear and the following year's Forbidden Door. On the February 7, 2024, episode of Rampage they and Cassidy were defeated by the Undisputed Kingdom (Matt Taven, Mike Bennett and Roderick Strong). April 3, 2024 episode of Dynamite, Berretta attacked Orange Cassidy using the knee strike, thus turning him heel after the duo lost a match to the Young Bucks, leaving the Best Friends and disbanding the team. He would join the Don Callis Family soon after.

==== Don Callis Family (2025–present) ====
On the April 17, 2025 at the Spring BreakThru episode of Collision, Romero turned heel after betraying Tomohiro Ishii in a tag match and participated in attacking Ishii with Beretta and the rest of the Don Callis Family, joining the group and reuniting Roppongi Vice (later renamed to RPG Vice). At All In Zero Hour, RPG Vice teamed with stablemates Hechicero and Lance Archer, losing to "Big Boom!" A.J. and The Conglomeration (Hologram, Kyle O'Reilly, and Tomohiro Ishii) .

== Championships and accomplishments ==
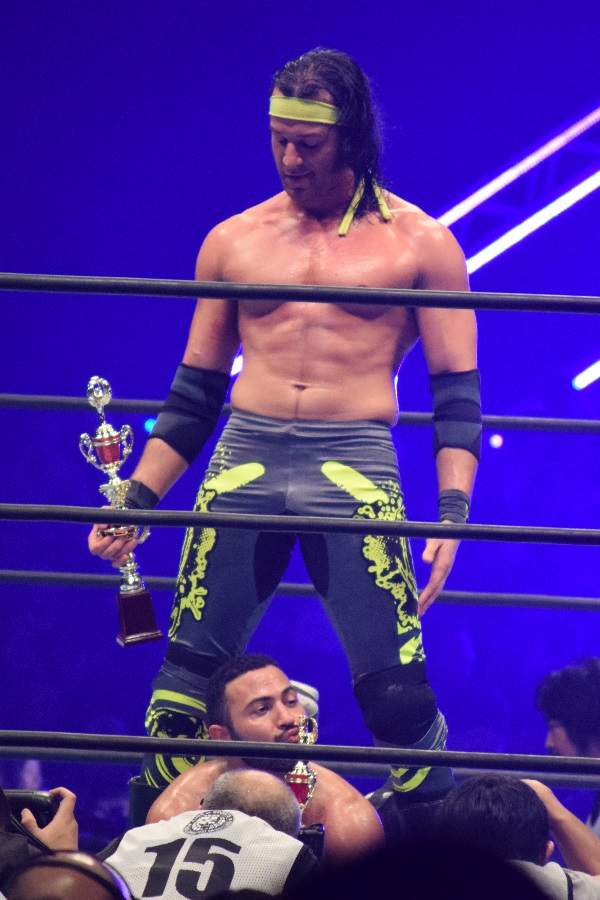
Roppongi Vice after winning the 2016 Super Jr. Tag Tournament

- New Japan Pro-Wrestling
  - IWGP Junior Heavyweight Tag Team Championship (4 times)
  - Super Jr. Tag Tournament (2016)
- Pro Wrestling Illustrated
  - Ranked Beretta No. 91 of the top 500 singles wrestlers in the PWI 500 in 2017
  - Ranked Romero No. 84 of the top 500 singles wrestlers in the PWI 500 in 2017
- WrestleCircus
  - WC Big Top Tag Team Championship (1 time)

== See also ==
- Roppongi 3K
- Best Friends
