= 10th Anniversary Show: Young Wolves Rising =

2012 Ring of Honor pay-per-view event

- Promotional poster featuring Eddie Edwards, Adam Cole, Davey Richards, and Kyle O'Reilly
- Promotion: Ring of Honor
- Date: March 4, 2012
- City: New York City, New York
- Venue: Hammerstein Ballroom
- Attendance: 1,400

Pay-per-view chronology
← Previous; Final Battle	Next → Showdown in the Sun

ROH Anniversary Show chronology
← Previous; 9th Anniversary	Next → 11th Anniversary

10th Anniversary Show: Young Wolves Rising was a professional wrestling pay-per-view (PPV) event produced by the Ring of Honor (ROH) promotion, that took place on March 4, 2012 at the Hammerstein Ballroom in New York City. It was the tenth "ROH Anniversary Show" and the first event in the 2012 ROH PPV schedule.

== Production ==
Other on-screen personnel
Role	Name
Commentators	Kevin Kelly
Commentators	Nigel McGuinness

10th Anniversary Show: Young Wolves Rising featured professional wrestling matches involving different wrestlers from pre-existing scripted feuds, plots, and storylines that played out on Ring of Honor's (ROH) television programs. Wrestlers portrayed villains or heroes as they followed a series of events that built tension and culminated in a wrestling match or series of matches.

== Results ==
No.	Results	Stipulations	Times
1	The All Night Express (Kenny King and Rhett Titus) defeated Wrestling's Greatest Tag Team (Charlie Haas and Shelton Benjamin)	Tag team match	13:29
2	Mike Bennett (with Bob Evans and Maria Kanellis) defeated Homicide	Singles match	10:46
3	The House of Truth (Michael Elgin and Roderick Strong) (with Truth Martini) defeated Amazing Red and T. J. Perkins	Tag team match	11:09
4	Jay Lethal (c) vs. Tommaso Ciampa (with Prince Nana, Ernesto Osiris, Princess Mia and R.D. Evans) ended in a time-limit draw	Singles match for the ROH World Television Championship	15:00
5	The Briscoe Brothers (Jay Briscoe and Mark Briscoe) (c) defeated The Young Bucks (Matt Jackson and Nick Jackson)	Tag team match for the ROH World Tag Team Championship	13:11
6	Kevin Steen defeated Jimmy Jacobs	No Holds Barred match	14:55
7	Adam Cole and Eddie Edwards defeated Team Ambition (Davey Richards and Kyle O'Reilly)	Tag team match	39:34
(c) / – the champion(s) heading into the match

== See also ==
- 2012 in professional wrestling
- List of Ring of Honor pay-per-view events
