= ROH 14th Anniversary Show =

2016 Ring of Honor pay-per-view event

- Official poster featuring Jay Lethal with his manager Truth Martini
- Promotion: Ring of Honor
- Date: February 26–27, 2016
- City: Sunrise Manor, Nevada
- Venue: Sam's Town Live
- Attendance: 800

Pay-per-view chronology
← Previous; Final Battle	Next → Global Wars

ROH Anniversary Show chronology
← Previous; 13th Anniversary	Next → 15th Anniversary

ROH 14th Anniversary was the two-night 14th ROH Anniversary Show professional wrestling pay-per-view (PPV) event produced by the American wrestling promotion Ring of Honor (ROH). It took place on February 26 and 27, 2016 at the Sam's Town Live in the Las Vegas suburb of Sunrise Manor, Nevada. It was the fourteenth event under the ROH Anniversary name. The first night was a pay-per-view broadcast, and the second night was a set of tapings for ROH's flagship TV show Ring of Honor Wrestling.

== Production ==
Other on-screen personnel
Role	Name
Commentators	Kevin Kelly
Commentators	Veda Scott
Commentators	Mr. Wrestling 3
Commentators	Brian Kendrick
Commentators	Nigel McGuinness

=== Storylines ===
ROH 14th Anniversary featured professional wrestling matches that involved wrestlers from pre-existing scripted feuds or storylines that play out on ROH's television program, Ring of Honor Wrestling. Wrestlers portrayed heroes (faces) or villains (heels) as they followed a series of events that built tension and culminated in a wrestling match or series of matches.

On January 26, 2016, ROH Matchmaker Nigel McGuinness announced that Jay Lethal would defend the ROH World Championship against Kyle O'Reilly and Adam Cole in a Triple Threat match in the Anniversary main event.

Through ROH's partnership with New Japan Pro-Wrestling (NJPW), the event also featured wrestlers from the Japanese promotion, including Hiroshi Tanahashi, Kazuchika Okada, Kushida, Tomohiro Ishii and Gedo. Shinsuke Nakamura was also originally announced for the event, but was later pulled from the show due to leaving NJPW. He was replaced by Hirooki Goto and Kenny Omega.

Originally, ROH announced that Roderick Strong would defend the ROH World Television Championship against Bobby Fish at the 14th Anniversary Show. However, on February 19 at the ROH and NJPW co-produced Honor Rising: Japan 2016 event in Tokyo, Japan, Strong lost the title to Tomohiro Ishii. Following this, Ishii was added to the scheduled Strong-Fish match, making it a Triple Threat match for the title. In addition, Hirooki Goto, who was originally scheduled to wrestle Ishii, would instead face Dalton Castle.

== Results ==
=== Night 1 (PPV) ===
No.	Results	Stipulations	Times
1^{D}	Silas Young defeated Cheeseburger, Gedo and Will Ferrara	Four-way match	5:56
2	Tomohiro Ishii (c) defeated Roderick Strong and Bobby Fish	Three-way match for the ROH World Television Championship	8:35
3	B. J. Whitmer defeated Adam Page	Singles match	9:12
4	Hirooki Goto defeated Dalton Castle (with The Boys)	Singles match	9:49
5	Alex Shelley defeated Christopher Daniels (with Frankie Kazarian)	Singles match	9:41
6	Hiroshi Tanahashi and Michael Elgin defeated The Briscoe Brothers (Jay Briscoe and Mark Briscoe)	Tag team match	14:50
7	Kazuchika Okada (with Gedo) defeated Moose (with Stokely Hathaway)	Singles match	10:30
8	The Elite (Kenny Omega and The Young Bucks) (c) defeated Kushida, A. C. H., and Matt Sydal	Six-man tag team match for the NEVER Openweight 6-Man Tag Team Championship	16:57
9	War Machine (Hanson and Raymond Rowe) (c) defeated The All Night Express (Rhett Titus and Kenny King)	No Disqualification tag team match for the ROH World Tag Team Championship	11:20
10	Jay Lethal (c) (with Truth Martini and Taeler Hendrix) defeated Adam Cole and Kyle O'Reilly	Three-way match for the ROH World Championship	13:44
(c) / – the champion(s) heading into the match; D / – this was a dark match

=== Night 2 (TV tapings) ===
No.	Results	Stipulations	Times
1^{D}	Brian Kendrick defeated Will Ferrara	Singles match	5:30
2	Tomohiro Ishii (c) defeated Cedric Alexander	Singles match for the ROH World Television Championship	6:18
3	The Briscoes (Jay Briscoe and Mark Briscoe) defeated Reno Scum (Adam Thornstowe and Luster the Legend)	Tag team match	6:57
4	Hiroshi Tanahashi and Michael Elgin defeated The Young Bucks (Matt Jackson and Nick Jackson)	Tag team match	13:05
5	Roderick Strong defeated Adam Page, Matt Sydal and Moose	Four-way match	10:55
6	Cheeseburger vs. Foxx Vinyer ended a no contest	Singles match	1:22
7	Jay Lethal (c) (with Taeler Hendrix and Truth Martini) defeated Hirooki Goto	Singles match for the ROH World Championship	7:54
8	reDRagon (Kyle O'Reilly and Bobby Fish) defeated Chaos (Kazuchika Okada and Gedo)	Tag team match	9:48
9	Adam Cole defeated Kushida	Singles match	10:31
10	The Motor City Machine Guns (Alex Shelley and Chris Sabin) defeated The Addiction (Christopher Daniels and Frankie Kazarian)	Tag team match	12:48
11	War Machine (Hanson and Raymond Rowe) (c) defeated Roppongi Vice (Baretta and Rocky Romero)	Tag team match for the ROH World Tag Team Championship	10:35
12	Kenny Omega defeated A. C. H.	Singles match	12:42
13	Dalton Castle (with The Boys) defeated Silas Young	Fight Without Honor	14:10
(c) / – the champion(s) heading into the match; D / – this was a dark match

== See also ==
- 2016 in professional wrestling
