= ROH Anniversary Show =

- Promotions: Ring of Honor
- First event: ROH One Year Anniversary Show (2003)

The ROH Anniversary Show was a professional wrestling event, held annually by the Ring of Honor promotion. The event celebrated the anniversary of the promotion's inaugural show The Era of Honor Begins, which was held on February 23, 2002. To coincide with this, the Anniversary Show was normally held in February, though it occasionally fell into March.

Although most years have seen a one-night celebration, the third year saw three events take place over two weekends. The fifth year went further and had five events in ROH's most popular venues, leading up to a sixth and final show in Liverpool, England across three weekends. In recent years, the Anniversary Show had become a two-night event, with a PPV broadcast followed the next day with TV tapings of the flagship Ring of Honor Wrestling program. All previous events were recorded and sold later on DVD.

The 18th Anniversary Show, which was scheduled to take place on March 13, 2020, was cancelled due to the COVID-19 pandemic. Even the 20th Anniversary Show was not held due to ROH on hiatus before its eventual sale to Tony Khan in 2022.

== Dates and venues ==
Event	Date	Venue	City	Main event
ROH One Year Anniversary Show	February 8, 2003	Elks Lodge	Queens, New York	Da Hit Squad (Mafia & Monsta Mack), Divine Storm (Chris Divine & Quiet Storm), The S.A.T. (Jose & Joel Maximo) & Mikey Whipwreck vs. Special K (Angel Dust, Brian XL, Deranged, Dixie, Hydro, Izzy, Jody Fleisch, Slim J, Slugger & Yeyo) in a Handicap Scramble Match
ROH Second Anniversary Show	February 14, 2004	National Guard Armory	Braintree, Massachusetts	AJ Styles vs. CM Punk for the Pure Wrestling Championship
ROH Third Anniversary Celebration	February 19, 2005	Rex Plex	Elizabeth, New Jersey	The Carnage Crew (H. C. Loc & Tony DeVito) vs. Generation Next (Roderick Strong & Jack Evans) vs. The Ring Crew Express (Dunn & Marcos) vs. Special K (Azrieal & Dixie) vs. Special K (Izzy & Deranged) in a Scramble Cage Match
ROH Third Anniversary Celebration	February 25, 2005	Montgomery County Fairgrounds	Dayton, Ohio	AJ Styles vs. Jimmy Rave
ROH Third Anniversary Celebration	February 26, 2005	Frontier Fieldhouse	Chicago Ridge, Illinois	Austin Aries (c) vs. Samoa Joe for the ROH World Championship
ROH Fourth Anniversary Show	February 25, 2006	Inman Sports Club	Edison, New Jersey	Generation Next (Austin Aries & Roderick Strong) (c) vs. AJ Styles & Matt Sydal for the ROH Tag Team Championship
ROH The Fifth Year Festival	February 16, 2007	Manhattan Center	New York City, New York	Homicide (c) vs. Jimmy Rave for the ROH World Championship
ROH The Fifth Year Festival	February 17, 2007	National Guard Armory	Philadelphia, Pennsylvania	Homicide (c) vs. Takeshi Morishima for the ROH World Championship
ROH The Fifth Year Festival	February 23, 2007	Montgomery County Fairgrounds	Dayton, Ohio	Takeshi Morishima (c) vs. B. J. Whitmer for the ROH World Championship
ROH The Fifth Year Festival	February 24, 2007	Windy City Fieldhouse	Chicago, Illinois	Samoa Joe & Homicide vs. Takeshi Morishima & Nigel McGuinness
ROH The Fifth Year Festival	March 3, 2007	Liverpool Olympia	Liverpool, Merseyside	Samoa Joe vs. Nigel McGuinness
ROH The Fifth Year Festival	March 4, 2007	Liverpool Olympia	Liverpool, Merseyside	Samoa Joe vs. Homicide
ROH 6th Anniversary Show	February 23, 2008	Manhattan Center	New York City, New York	Nigel McGuinness (c) vs. Bryan Danielson for the ROH World Championship
ROH 7th Anniversary Show	March 21, 2009	Hammerstein Ballroom	New York City, New York	Nigel McGuinness (c) vs. KENTA for the ROH World Championship
ROH 8th Anniversary Show	February 13, 2010	Manhattan Center	New York City, New York	Austin Aries (c) vs. Tyler Black for the ROH World Championship
ROH 9th Anniversary Show	February 26, 2011	Frontier Fieldhouse	Chicago Ridge, Illinois	The Briscoe Brothers (Jay Briscoe & Mark Briscoe) vs. Wrestling's Greatest Tag Team (Charlie Haas & Shelton Benjamin) for a future match for the ROH World Tag Team Championship
10th Anniversary Show: Young Wolves Rising	March 4, 2012	Hammerstein Ballroom	New York City, New York	Eddie Edwards & Adam Cole vs. Team Ambition (Davey Richards & Kyle O'Reilly)
ROH 11th Anniversary Show	March 2, 2013	Frontier Fieldhouse	Chicago Ridge, Illinois	Kevin Steen (c) vs. Jay Lethal for the ROH World Championship
ROH 12th Anniversary Show	February 21, 2014	Pennsylvania National Guard Armory	Philadelphia, Pennsylvania	Kevin Steen vs. Cliff Compton in an Unsanctioned Philadelphia Street Fight
ROH 13th Anniversary Show	March 1, 2015	The Orleans	Paradise, Nevada	Jay Briscoe (c) vs. Tommaso Ciampa vs. Michael Elgin vs. Hanson in a Four corner survival match for the ROH World Championship
ROH 14th Anniversary Show	February 26, 2016	Roxy's Lounge at Sam's Town	Sunrise Manor, Nevada	Jay Lethal (c) vs. Adam Cole vs. Kyle O'Reilly in a Three Way match for the ROH World Championship
ROH 15th Anniversary Show	March 10, 2017	Roxy's Lounge at Sam's Town	Sunrise Manor, Nevada	Adam Cole (c) vs. Christopher Daniels for the ROH World Championship
ROH 16th Anniversary Show	March 9, 2018	Sam's Town Hotel and Gambling Hall	Sunrise Manor, Nevada	Dalton Castle (c) vs. Jay Lethal for the ROH World Championship
ROH 17th Anniversary Show	March 15, 2019	Sam's Town Hotel and Gambling Hall	Sunrise Manor, Nevada	Villain Enterprises (Brody King and PCO) vs. The Briscoes (Jay Briscoe and Mark Briscoe) (c) Las Vegas Street Fight for the ROH World Tag Team Championship
ROH 19th Anniversary Show	March 26, 2021	UMBC Event Center	Baltimore, Maryland	Rush (c) vs. Jay Lethal for the ROH World Championship
(c) – refers to the champion(s) heading into the match

== See also ==
- ROH Death Before Dishonor
- ROH Final Battle
