= List of ROH World Tag Team Champions =

Listing of professional wrestling champions for the ROH World Tag Team Championship

The ROH World Tag Team Championship is a professional wrestling world tag team championship owned by the Ring of Honor (ROH) promotion; it is contested for in their tag team division. The championship was created and debuted on September 21, 2002, at ROH's Unscripted event. At said event, the championship was represented by a trophy, which was destroyed by American Dragon and Michael Modest after they were defeated by The Prophecy (Christopher Daniels and Donovan Morgan), who had just become the inaugural champions. Daniels and Morgan were awarded physical belts later in 2002. Originally called the ROH Tag Team Championship, the title was renamed to the ROH World Tag Team Championship in July 2006 after the title was defended in Japan for the first time earlier that month, when then-champions, Austin Aries and Roderick Strong, defeated Naruki Doi and Masato Yoshino to retain the championship.

Current champions El Sky Team (Místico and Máscara Dorada).

Title reigns are determined either by professional wrestling matches between different wrestlers involved in pre-existing scripted feuds, plots, and storylines, or by scripted circumstances. Reigns that were won on pay-per-view events aired on tape delay up to weeks or months apart. Reigns that were won at live events were released on DVD. Title changes that occurred on ROH's primary television program, Ring of Honor Wrestling, air up to three to five weeks apart.

The current champions are El Sky Team (Místico and Máscara Dorada), who are in their first reign as a team and individually. They won the title by defeating La Facción Ingobernable (Sammy Guevara and The Beast Mortos) at CMLL Super Viernes on June 26, 2026.

ROH publishes a list of defenses for each champion on their official website, unlike most other professional wrestling promotions. As of November 2026, The Briscoe Brothers' fourth reign and Austin Aries' and Roderick Strong's only reign are tied for most defenses, with 18. The Briscoe Brothers' second, third, and sixth reigns, Dan Maff's and B. J. Whitmer's first reign, The Second City Saints' (CM Punk and Colt Cabana) first reign, The Backseat Boyz (Johnny Kashmere and Trent Acid) only reign and the Forever Hooligans' only reign are all tied for the least defenses, with zero. At 441 days, The Foundation's (Jay Lethal and Jonathan Gresham) first reign is the longest in the title's history. Overall, there have been 72 reigns among 77 different wrestlers and 44 different teams.

== Title history ==
=== Names ===
Name	Years
ROH Tag Team Championship	September 21, 2002 – July 9, 2006
ROH World Tag Team Championship	July 9, 2006 – present

=== Reigns ===
Key
No.	Overall reign number
Reign	Reign number for the specific team—reign numbers for the individuals are in parentheses, if different
Days	Number of days held
<1	Reign lasted less than a day
+	Current reign is changing daily

No.	Champion	Championship change			Reign statistics		Notes	Ref.
No.	Champion	Date	Event	Location	Reign	Days	Notes	Ref.
Ring of Honor (ROH)
1	The Prophecy (Christopher Daniels and Donovan Morgan)	September 21, 2002	Unscripted	Philadelphia, PA	1	175	Defeated Bryan Danielson and Michael Modest in the inaugural ROH tag team championship tournament finals to become the inaugural champions.	
2	A.J. Styles and Amazing Red	March 15, 2003	Expect the Unexpected	Cambridge, MA	1	158	Defeated Christopher Daniels and Xavier, who was filling in for Donovan Morgan.	
—	Vacated	August 20, 2003	—	—	—	—	A.J. Styles and the Amazing Red vacated the championship due to Red suffering an injury.	
3	The Backseat Boyz (Johnny Kashmere and Trent Acid)	September 20, 2003	Glory by Honor II	Philadelphia, PA	1	26	Won the vacant championship in a Gauntlet Match that also involved The Briscoe Brothers (Jay Briscoe and Mark Briscoe), Special K (Hydro and Deranged), The Ring Crew Express (Dunn and Marcos), and Special K (Izzy and Dixie).	
4	Special K (Dixie and Izzy)	October 16, 2003	Tradition Continues	Glen Burnie, MD	1	16		
5	The Briscoe Brothers (Jay Briscoe and Mark Briscoe)	November 1, 2003	Main Event Spectacles	Elizabeth, NJ	1	175		
6	Second City Saints (CM Punk and Colt Cabana)	April 24, 2004	Reborn: Stage Two	Chicago Ridge, IL	1	21		
7	The Prophecy (B. J. Whitmer and Dan Maff)	May 15, 2004	Round Robin Challenge III	Lexington, MA	1	<1		
8	The Briscoe Brothers (Jay Briscoe and Mark Briscoe)	May 15, 2004	Round Robin Challenge III	Lexington, MA	2	<1		
9	Second City Saints (CM Punk and Colt Cabana)	May 15, 2004	Round Robin Challenge III	Lexington, MA	2	84		
10	The Rottweilers (Ricky Reyes and Rocky Romero)	August 7, 2004	Testing the Limit	Philadelphia, PA	1	196		
11	B. J. Whitmer and Dan Maff	February 19, 2005	Third Anniversary Celebration: Part 1	Elizabeth, NJ	2	37		
—	Vacated	March 28, 2005	—	—	—	—	The championship was vacated when Dan Maff left ROH. In kayfabe, ROH stated Maff was forced to retire as the result of an automobile accident.	
12	B. J. Whitmer and Jimmy Jacobs	April 2, 2005	Best of American Super Juniors Tournament	Asbury Park, NJ	1 (3, 1)	98	Defeated Jay Lethal and Samoa Joe to win the vacant championship.	
13	Carnage Crew (H. C. Loc and Tony DeVito)	July 9, 2005	Escape from New York	New York City, NY	1	14		
14	B. J. Whitmer and Jimmy Jacobs	July 23, 2005	The Homecoming	Philadelphia, PA	2 (4, 2)	70		
15	Sal Rinauro and Tony Mamaluke	October 1, 2005	Joe vs. Kobashi	New York City, NY	1	77		
16	Generation Next (Austin Aries and Roderick Strong)	December 17, 2005	Final Battle	Edison, NJ	1	273	The championship was renamed the ROH World Tag Team Championship on July 9, 2006, after Aries and Strong defeated Masato Yoshino and Naruki Doi in Japan.	
17	Kings of Wrestling (Chris Hero and Claudio Castagnoli)	September 16, 2006	Glory by Honor V: Night 2	New York City, NY	1	70		
18	Christopher Daniels and Matt Sydal	November 25, 2006	Dethroned	Edison, NJ	1 (2, 1)	91		
19	The Briscoe Brothers (Jay Briscoe and Mark Briscoe)	February 24, 2007	Fifth Year Festival: Chicago	Chicago, IL	3	7		
20	Naruki Doi and Shingo	March 3, 2007	Fifth Year Festival: Liverpool	Liverpool, England	1	27		
21	The Briscoe Brothers (Jay Briscoe and Mark Briscoe)	March 30, 2007	All-Star Extravaganza III	Detroit, MI	4	275		
22	Age of the Fall (Jimmy Jacobs and Tyler Black)	December 30, 2007	Final Battle	New York City, NY	1 (3, 1)	27		
23	No Remorse Corps (Davey Richards and Rocky Romero)	January 26, 2008	Without Remorse	Chicago Ridge, IL	1 (1, 2)	77		
24	The Briscoe Brothers (Jay Briscoe and Mark Briscoe)	April 12, 2008	Injustice	Edison, NJ	5	29	Austin Aries was a substitute for Mark Briscoe, who had sustained a legitimate injury, during the first and only championship defense.	
—	Vacated	May 11, 2008	A New Level	N/A	—	—	The championship was vacated by The Briscoe Brothers (Jay Briscoe and Mark Briscoe) due to Mark's injury.	
25	Age of the Fall (Jimmy Jacobs and Tyler Black)	June 6, 2008	Up for Grabs	Hartford, CT	2 (4, 2)	105	Defeated El Generico and Kevin Steen in the final of a one-night tournament for the vacant championship.	
26	El Generico and Kevin Steen	September 19, 2008	Driven	Boston, MA	1	203		
27	American Wolves (Davey Richards and Eddie Edwards)	April 10, 2009	Ring of Honor Wrestling	Philadelphia, PA	1 (2, 1)	253	This was a "Tables are Legal" match. This episode aired on tape delay on May 30, 2009.	
28	The Briscoe Brothers (Jay Briscoe and Mark Briscoe)	December 19, 2009	Final Battle	Manhattan, New York City, NY	6	105		
29	Kings of Wrestling (Chris Hero and Claudio Castagnoli)	April 3, 2010	The Big Bang!	Charlotte, NC	2	363		
30	Wrestling's Greatest Tag Team (Charlie Haas and Shelton Benjamin)	April 1, 2011	Honor Takes Center Stage: Chapter 1	Atlanta, GA	1	266		
31	The Briscoe Brothers (Jay Briscoe and Mark Briscoe)	December 23, 2011	Final Battle	Manhattan, New York City, NY	7	141		
32	Wrestling's Greatest Tag Team (Charlie Haas and Shelton Benjamin)	May 12, 2012	Border Wars	Toronto, ON	2	43		
33	The All Night Express (Kenny King and Rhett Titus)	June 24, 2012	Best in the World 2012: Hostage Crisis	New York City, NY	1	16		
—	Vacated	July 10, 2012	—	—	—	—	The championship was officially declared vacant after ROH severed its ties with Kenny King due to a contract dispute.	
34	S.C.U.M. (Jimmy Jacobs and Steve Corino)	September 15, 2012	Death Before Dishonor X: State of Emergency	Chicago Ridge, IL	1 (5, 1)	92	Defeated Charlie Haas and Rhett Titus in a tournament final to win the vacant championship.	
35	The Briscoe Brothers (Jay Briscoe and Mark Briscoe)	December 16, 2012	Final Battle 2012: Doomsday	New York City, NY	8	76	This was a three-way tag team match, also involving Caprice Coleman and Cedric Alexander.	
36	reDRagon (Bobby Fish and Kyle O'Reilly)	March 2, 2013	ROH 11th Anniversary Show	Chicago Ridge, IL	1	147		
37	Forever Hooligans (Alex Koslov and Rocky Romero)	July 27, 2013	Ring of Honor Wrestling	Providence, RI	1 (1, 3)	7	Aired on tape delay on August 3, 2013.	
38	American Wolves (Davey Richards and Eddie Edwards)	August 3, 2013	All-Star Extravaganza V	Toronto, ON	2 (3, 2)	14		
39	reDRagon (Bobby Fish and Kyle O'Reilly)	August 17, 2013	Manhattan Mayhem V	New York City, NY	2	203		
40	The Young Bucks (Matt Jackson and Nick Jackson)	March 8, 2014	Raising the Bar: Night 2	Chicago Ridge, IL	1	70		
41	reDRagon (Bobby Fish and Kyle O'Reilly)	May 17, 2014	War of the Worlds	New York City, NY	3	322		
42	The Addiction (Christopher Daniels and Frankie Kazarian)	April 4, 2015	Ring of Honor Wrestling	San Antonio, TX	1 (3, 1)	167	Aired on tape delay on April 25, 2015.	
43	The Kingdom (Matt Taven and Mike Bennett)	September 18, 2015	All Star Extravaganza VII	San Antonio, TX	1	91	This was a three-way tag team match, also involving The Young Bucks (Matt Jackson and Nick Jackson).	
44	War Machine (Hanson and Raymond Rowe)	December 18, 2015	Final Battle	Philadelphia, PA	1	143		
45	The Addiction (Christopher Daniels and Frankie Kazarian)	May 9, 2016	War of the Worlds	Dearborn, MI	2 (4, 2)	144		
46	The Young Bucks (Matt Jackson and Nick Jackson)	September 30, 2016	All Star Extravaganza VIII	Lowell, MA	2	155	This was a three-way Ladder War, also involving The Motor City Machine Guns (Alex Shelley and Chris Sabin).	
47	The Broken Hardys (Brother Nero and Matt Hardy)	March 4, 2017	Manhattan Mayhem VI	New York City, NY	1	28		
48	The Young Bucks (Matt Jackson and Nick Jackson)	April 1, 2017	Supercard of Honor XI	Lakeland, FL	3	174	This was a ladder match.	
49	Motor City Machine Guns (Alex Shelley and Chris Sabin)	September 22, 2017	Death Before Dishonor XV	Sunrise Manor, NV	1	168		
50	The Briscoe Brothers (Jay Briscoe and Mark Briscoe)	March 9, 2018	ROH 16th Anniversary Show	Sunrise Manor, NV	9	219		
51	SoCal Uncensored (Frankie Kazarian and Scorpio Sky)	October 14, 2018	Glory By Honor XVI: Philadelphia	Philadelphia, PA	1 (3, 1)	61	This was a three-way tag team match, also involving The Young Bucks (Matt Jackson and Nick Jackson). Aired on tape delay on November 16, 2018.	
52	The Briscoe Brothers (Jay Briscoe and Mark Briscoe)	December 14, 2018	Final Battle	New York City, NY	10	91	This was Ladder War IX, also involving The Young Bucks (Matt Jackson and Nick Jackson).	
53	Villain Enterprises (Brody King and PCO)	March 15, 2019	ROH 17th Anniversary Show	Sunrise Manor, NV	1	22	This was a Las Vegas Street Fight.	
54	Guerrillas of Destiny (Tama Tonga and Tanga Loa)	April 6, 2019	G1 Supercard	New York City, NY	1	105	This was a Winner Takes All four-way match, that also involved The Briscoe Brothers (Jay Briscoe and Mark Briscoe) and Los Ingobernables de Japón (Evil and Sanada). The Guerrillas' IWGP Tag Team Championship was also at stake.	
55	The Briscoe Brothers (Jay Briscoe and Mark Briscoe)	July 20, 2019	Manhattan Mayhem	New York City, NY	11	146	This was a New York City Street Fight.	
56	The Foundation (Jay Lethal and Jonathan Gresham)	December 13, 2019	Final Battle	Baltimore, MD	1	N/A	The exact date that The Foundation lost the championship is uncertain.	
57	La Facción Ingobernable (Dragon Lee and Kenny King)	N/A	Ring of Honor Wrestling	Baltimore, MD	1 (1, 2)	N/A	This was a Pure Rules match, which aired on February 27, 2021. The date when the match happened it's unknown, as ROH has held empty arena tapings at the UMBC Event Center since August 2020, after resuming operations following a five-month hiatus due to the COVID-19 pandemic.	
58	The Foundation (Rhett Titus and Tracy Williams)	March 26, 2021	ROH 19th Anniversary Show	Baltimore, MD	1 (2, 1)	107	Defeated La Bestia del Ring and Kenny King, as Bestia was filling in for the injured Dragon Lee.	
59	Violence Unlimited (Chris Dickinson and Homicide)	July 11, 2021	Best in the World	Baltimore, MD	1	N/A	Defeated Jonathan Gresham and Rhett Titus, as Gresham was filling in for the injured Tracy Williams, in a Fight Without Honor match. The exact date that Dickinson and Homicide lost the championship is uncertain.	
60	La Facción Ingobernable (Dragon Lee and Kenny King)	N/A	Ring of Honor Wrestling	Baltimore, MD	2 (2, 3)	N/A	The exact date when the match happened is unknown, therefore. Aired on tape delay on September 11, 2021.	
61	The OGK (Matt Taven and Mike Bennett)	November 14, 2021	Honor for All	Baltimore, MD	2	27	The OGK were previously known as The Kingdom.	
62	The Briscoe Brothers (Jay Briscoe and Mark Briscoe)	December 11, 2021	Final Battle	Baltimore, MD	12	111	During this reign, Tony Khan purchased Ring of Honor.	
63	FTR (Cash Wheeler and Dax Harwood)	April 1, 2022	Supercard of Honor XV	Garland, TX	1	253		
64	The Briscoes (Jay Briscoe and Mark Briscoe)	December 10, 2022	Final Battle	Arlington, TX	13	111	This was a Double Dog Collar match. In previous reigns, they were known as The Briscoe Brothers; On January 17, 2023, Jay Briscoe died from injuries sustained in a car crash.	
—	Vacated	March 31, 2023	Supercard of Honor	Los Angeles, CA	—	—	On the March 10, 2023, edition of AEW Rampage, Mark Briscoe announced he would be vacating the championship due to the death of his brother. The championship was officially vacated at the Supercard of Honor event.	
65	The Lucha Brothers (Penta El Zero Miedo and Rey Fénix)	March 31, 2023	Supercard of Honor	Los Angeles, CA	1	112	Defeated Aussie Open (Kyle Fletcher and Mark Davis), La Facción Ingobernable (Dralístico and Rush), The Kingdom (Matt Taven and Mike Bennett) and Top Flight (Dante Martin and Darius Martin) in a "Reach for the Sky" ladder match, to win the vacant championship.	
66	Aussie Open (Kyle Fletcher and Mark Davis)	July 21, 2023	Death Before Dishonor	Trenton, NJ	1	37	This was a four-way tag team match also involving The Kingdom and Best Friends.	
67	Better Than You Bay Bay (Adam Cole and MJF)	August 27, 2023	All In	London, England	1	123	This was an All Elite Wrestling event. During this reign, Samoa Joe temporarily defended the titles with MJF due to Cole suffering a broken ankle.	
68	The Undisputed Kingdom (Matt Taven and Mike Bennett)	December 27, 2023	Dynamite: New Year's Smash	Orlando, FL	3	234	This was an All Elite Wrestling event. They originally won the titles as The Devil's Masked Men against MJF in a 2-on-1 handicap match, and would later reveal their identities at Worlds End. Previously known as simply The Kingdom, Adam Cole renamed the group the Undisputed Kingdom on the January 3, 2024 episode of Dynamite.	
69	The Sons of Texas (Dustin Rhodes and Sammy Guevara)	August 17, 2024	Collision	Arlington, TX	1	376	This was an All Elite Wrestling event.	
—	Vacated	August 28, 2025	Ring of Honor Wrestling	Cleveland, OH	—	—	The titles were vacated due to Dustin undergoing double knee replacement surgery.	
70	La Facción Ingobernable (Rush and Sammy Guevara)	August 29, 2025	Death Before Dishonor	Philadelphia, PA	1 (1, 2)	91	Defeated The Outrunners (Turbo Floyd and Truth Magnum) to win the vacant titles.	
—	Vacated	November 28, 2025	Ring of Honor Wrestling	—	—	—	The titles were vacated with Rush out due to knee injury.	
71	La Facción Ingobernable (Sammy Guevara and The Beast Mortos)	December 5, 2025	Final Battle	Columbus, OH	1 (3, 1)	203	Defeated Tommy Billington and Adam Priest to win the vacant titles.	
72	El Sky Team (Místico and Máscara Dorada)	June 26, 2026	CMLL Super Viernes	Mexico City, Mexico	1	144+	This was a CMLL event.	

== Combined reigns ==
As of November 17, 2026.

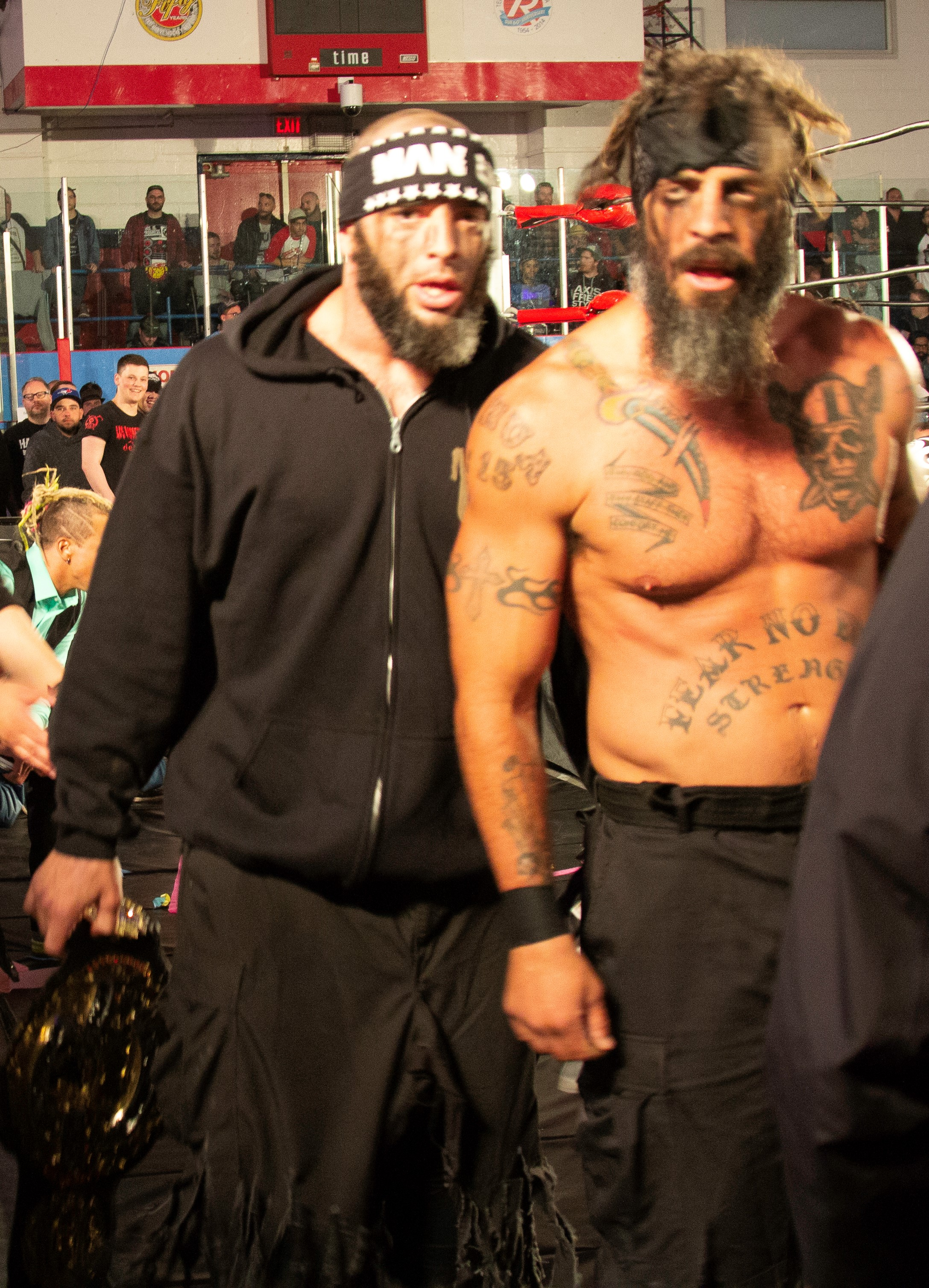
Record-setting 13-time, and having most combined days at 1486 days as champions, The Briscoes.

†	Indicates the current champions
¤	The exact length of at least one title reign is uncertain

=== By team ===
Rank	Team	No. of reigns	Combined days
1	The Briscoe Brothers/The Briscoes (Jay Briscoe and Mark Briscoe)	13	1,486
2	reDRagon (Bobby Fish and Kyle O'Reilly)	3	672
3	The Foundation (Jay Lethal and Jonathan Gresham)	1	¤
4	Kings of Wrestling (Chris Hero and Claudio Castagnoli)	2	433
5	The Young Bucks (Matt Jackson and Nick Jackson)	3	399
6	The Sons of Texas (Dustin Rhodes and Sammy Guevara)	1	376
7	The Kingdom/The OGK (Matt Taven and Mike Bennett)	3	352
8	The Addiction (Christopher Daniels and Frankie Kazarian)	2	311
9	Wrestling's Greatest Tag Team (Charlie Haas and Shelton Benjamin)	2	309
10	Generation Next (Austin Aries and Roderick Strong)	1	273
11	American Wolves (Davey Richards and Eddie Edwards)	2	267
12	FTR (Cash Wheeler and Dax Harwood)	1	253
13	El Generico and Kevin Steen	1	203
13	La Facción Ingobernable (Sammy Guevara and The Beast Mortos)	1	203
15	The Rottweilers (Ricky Reyes and Rocky Romero)	1	196
16	The Prophecy (Christopher Daniels and Donovan Morgan)	1	175
17	B. J. Whitmer and Jimmy Jacobs	2	168
17	Motor City Machine Guns (Alex Shelley and Chris Sabin)	1	168
18	A.J. Styles and The Amazing Red	1	158
19	El Sky Team † (Místico and Máscara Dorada)	1	144+
20	War Machine (Hanson and Raymond Rowe)	1	143
22	Age of the Fall (Jimmy Jacobs and Tyler Black)	2	132
23	Better Than You Bay Bay (Adam Cole and MJF)	1	123
24	The Lucha Brothers (Penta El Zero Miedo and Rey Fénix)	1	112
25	The Foundation (Rhett Titus and Tracy Williams)	1	107
26	Second City Saints (CM Punk and Colt Cabana)	2	105
26	Guerrillas of Destiny (Tama Tonga and Tanga Loa)	1	105
28	La Facción Ingobernable (Dragon Lee and Kenny King)	2	¤
29	S.C.U.M. (Jimmy Jacobs and Steve Corino)	1	92
30	Christopher Daniels and Matt Sydal	1	91
30	La Facción Ingobernable (Rush and Sammy Guevara)	1	91
32	No Remorse Corps (Davey Richards and Rocky Romero)	1	77
32	Sal Rinauro and Tony Mamaluke	1	77
34	SoCal Uncensored (Frankie Kazarian and Scorpio Sky)	1	61
34	Violence Unlimited (Chris Dickinson and Homicide)	1	¤
36	B. J. Whitmer and Dan Maff	2	37
36	Aussie Open (Kyle Fletcher and Mark Davis)	1	37
38	The Broken Hardys (Brother Nero and Matt Hardy)	1	28
39	Naruki Doi and Shingo	1	27
40	The Backseat Boyz (Johnny Kashmere and Trent Acid)	1	26
41	Villain Enterprises (Brody King and PCO)	1	22
42	The All Night Express (Kenny King and Rhett Titus)	1	16
42	Special K (Dixie and Izzy)	1	16
44	Carnage Crew (H. C. Loc and Tony DeVito)	1	14
45	Forever Hooligans (Alex Koslov and Rocky Romero)	1	7

=== By wrestler ===
Rank	Wrestler	No. of reigns	Combined Days
1	Jay Briscoe	13	1,485
1	Mark Briscoe	13	1,485
3	Bobby Fish	3	672
3	Kyle O'Reilly	3	672
5	Sammy Guevara	3	670
6	Christopher Daniels	4	577
7	Jay Lethal	1	¤
7	Jonathan Gresham	1	¤
9	Chris Hero	2	433
9	Claudio Castagnoli	2	433
11	Matt Jackson	3	399
11	Nick Jackson	3	399
13	Jimmy Jacobs	5	392
14	Dustin Rhodes	1	376
15	Frankie Kazarian	3	372
16	Matt Taven	3	352
16	Mike Bennett	3	352
18	Davey Richards	3	344
19	Charlie Haas	2	309
19	Shelton Benjamin	2	309
21	Rocky Romero	3	280
22	Austin Aries	1	273
22	Roderick Strong	1	273
24	Eddie Edwards	2	267
25	Cash Wheeler	1	253
25	Dax Harwood	1	253
27	B. J. Whitmer	4	205
28	The Beast Mortos	1	203
28	El Generico	1	203
28	Kevin Steen	1	203
31	Ricky Reyes	1	196
32	Donovan Morgan	1	175
33	Alex Shelley	1	168
33	Chris Sabin	1	168
35	A.J. Styles	1	158
35	Amazing Red	1	158
37	Místico †	1	144+
37	Máscara Dorada †	1	144+
39	Hanson	1	143
39	Raymond Rowe	1	143
41	Tyler Black	2	132
42	Rhett Titus	2	123
43	Adam Cole	1	123
43	MJF	1	123
45	Penta El Zero Miedo	1	112
45	Rey Fénix	1	112
47	Kenny King	3	¤
48	Tracy Williams	1	107
49	CM Punk	2	105
49	Colt Cabana	2	105
49	Tama Tonga	1	105
49	Tanga Loa	1	105
53	Dragon Lee	2	¤
54	Steve Corino	1	92
55	Matt Sydal	1	91
55	Rush	1	91
57	Sal Rinauro	1	77
57	Tony Mamaluke	1	77
59	Chris Dickinson	1	¤
59	Homicide	1	¤
59	Scorpio Sky	1	61
62	Dan Maff	2	37
62	Kyle Fletcher	1	37
62	Mark Davis	1	37
65	Brother Nero	1	28
65	Matt Hardy	1	28
67	Naruki Doi	1	27
67	Shingo	1	27
69	Johnny Kashmere	1	26
69	Trent Acid	1	26
71	Brody King	1	22
71	PCO	1	22
73	Dixie	1	16
73	Izzy	1	16
75	H. C. Loc	1	14
75	Tony DeVito	1	14
77	Alex Koslov	1	7

== Notes ==
1. This event was a live event that was later released on DVD.
2. Dan Maff's and B. J. Whitmer's first reign was won while they were in the alliance The Prophecy, while their second was won while they were no longer involved.
3. The Kings of Wrestling's (Chris Hero and Claudio Castagnoli) fourth defense is not recognized by ROH because it was defended at a Combat Zone Wrestling event, which was not sanctioned by ROH.
4. This event was a pay-per-view that later aired on tape delay.
5. Each reign is ranked highest to lowest; reigns with the exact number mean they are tied for that certain rank
