= ROH 9th Anniversary Show =

2011 Ring of Honor pay-per-view event

9th Anniversary Show
- Promotional poster featuring (clockwise) Homicide, Roderick Strong, Wrestling's Greatest Tag Team and Briscoe Brothers
- Promotion: Ring of Honor
- Date: February 26, 2011
- City: Chicago, Illinois
- Venue: Frontier Park Field House

Pay-per-view chronology
← Previous; Final Battle 2010	Next → Honor Takes Center Stage

ROH Anniversary Show chronology
← Previous; 8th Anniversary	Next → 10th Anniversary

9th Anniversary Show was the 9th ROH Anniversary Show professional wrestling pay-per-view (PPV) event produced by Ring of Honor (ROH). It took place on February 26, 2011, at the Frontier Park Field House in Chicago. It was the ninth annual event in the Anniversary Show chronology, with the first taking place in 2003. It was the sixth ROH event to be shown on live online pay-per-view.

== Production ==
=== Background ===
In December 2010, ROH announced during Final Battle that their next pay-per-view would be taking place in February and would be live on internet pay-per-view through GoFightLive. It was later finalized that the show would be their ninth anniversary event in Chicago with a triple main event announced at the same time.

=== Storylines ===
Other on-screen personnel
Commentators	Dave Prazak
Commentators	Kevin Kelly

Final Battle featured professional wrestling matches that involved different wrestlers from existing, scripted feuds and storylines. Wrestlers portrayed villains or heroes, or more ambiguous characters in scripted contests that built tension and culminated in a wrestling match on the pay-per-view.

The World Championship rivalry going into the 9th Anniversary Show was between reigning champion Roderick Strong and returning ROH veteran Homicide. At the Glory By Honor IX PPV in September 2010 Roderick Strong won the ROH World Championship from Tyler Black, however while he was celebrating the lights in the building blacked out and when they resumed Homicide returned to ROH after a two-year absence, having a verbal confrontation with Strong. Homicide, who had appeared in ROH regularly from their first event The Era of Honor Begins until April 2007, then went on a two-month winning streak, culminating in a match at December's Final Battle 2010 PPV where he defeated fellow returning ROH legend Christopher Daniels, who was also in the hunt for the World Championship. As a result of this and previous wins, ROH announced on 3 January that Homicide would face the ROH World Champion at the 9th Anniversary Show, with the title being defended twice during January against El Generico and Jay Briscoe and the winner facing Homicide. In the weeks building up to the event, ROH's weekly television show Ring of Honor Wrestling played up the past tension between ROH authority figure Jim Cornette and Homicide during both their previous time in ROH. Cornette tried to Homicide peace, but Homicide maintained his only focus was on winning the championship.

The second rivalry going into the event was also for an ROH championship, specifically the ROH World Tag Team Championship, between reigning champions The Kings of Wrestling and The All Night Express team of Rhett Titus and Kenny King. The match was booked after The All Night Express won a contendership match in November 2010's Fate of An Angel II against Colt Cabana and El Generico. This title defence is the first to come after the Kings of Wrestling achieved the honour of holding the ROH World Tag Team Championship longer than any other team in a single reign, reaching 276 days on 4 January 2011.

The third main event initially announced for the event marked the first match between Wrestling's Greatest Tag Team (Charlie Haas and Shelton Benjamin) and the Briscoe Brothers (Jay Briscoe and Mark Briscoe). The Briscoes have been a mainstay of ROH since the founding of the promotion nine years previously, while Wrestling's Greatest Tag Team achieved success outside of ROH, most notably in World Wrestling Entertainment, and entered ROH the previous September at Glory By Honor IX. This led to an eight-man tag team match on Ring of Honor Wrestling which saw the Briscoes and Wrestling's Greatest Tag Team team together, but end in a no contest after the two teams, despite being on the same side, began to brawl against each other.

A third championship match was added to the card in early February. In December, Christopher Daniels beat ROH World Television Champion Eddie Edwards at the tapings of Ring of Honor Wrestling. Their rematch was subsequently booked for this pay-per-view and owing to Daniels having two victories over Edwards (one in a non-title match) the stipulation was added to make it a Two out of Three Falls match to make a decisive winner.

== Results ==
No.	Results	Stipulations	Times
1	Davey Richards defeated Colt Cabana	Singles match	12:13
2	Mike Bennett (with Bob Evans) defeated Grizzly Redwood, Kyle O'Reilly and Steve Corino	Four-way match	10:51
3	El Generico defeated Michael Elgin (with Truth Martini)	Singles match	10:33
4	Roderick Strong (c) (with Truth Martini) defeated Homicide	No Holds Barred match for the ROH World Championship	14:57
5	Sara Del Rey (with Shane Hagadorn) defeated MsChif	Women of Honor Singles match	03:57
6	The Kings of Wrestling (Chris Hero and Claudio Castagnoli) (c) (with Shane Hagadorn) defeated The All Night Express (Kenny King and Rhett Titus)	Tag team match for the ROH World Tag Team Championship	15:50
7	Christopher Daniels (c) vs. Eddie Edwards ended in a time-limit draw (1–1)	Two out of Three Falls match for the ROH World Television Championship	30:00
8	Wrestling's Greatest Tag Team (Charlie Haas and Shelton Benjamin) defeated The Briscoe Brothers (Jay Briscoe and Mark Briscoe)	Tag team match	22:16
(c) / – the champion(s) heading into the match

== See also ==
- 2011 in professional wrestling
- List of Ring of Honor pay-per-view events
