= ROH 15th Anniversary Show =

2017 Ring of Honor pay-per-view event

- Promotional poster for the first night, featuring Adam Cole and Christopher Daniels
- Promotion: Ring of Honor
- Date: March 10 and 11, 2017
- City: Sunrise Manor, Nevada
- Venue: Sam's Town Live Casino
- Attendance: 900
- Tagline: Winner Takes All

Pay-per-view chronology
← Previous; Final Battle	Next → Supercard of Honor XI

ROH Anniversary Show chronology
← Previous; 14th Anniversary	Next → 16th Anniversary

ROH 15th Anniversary was the two-night 15th ROH Anniversary Show professional wrestling pay-per-view (PPV) event produced by the American wrestling promotion Ring of Honor. It took place on March 10 and 11, 2017, at the Sam's Town Live in the Las Vegas suburb of Sunrise Manor, Nevada. The first night was a pay-per-view broadcast, while the following night was a set of tapings for the ROH flagship program Ring of Honor Wrestling.

== Production ==
Other on-screen personnel
Role	Name
Commentators	Colt Cabana
Commentators	Ian Riccaboni
Commentators	Kevin Kelly

=== Storylines ===
ROH 15th Anniversary features professional wrestling matches that involved wrestlers from pre-existing scripted feuds or storylines that play out on ROH's television program, Ring of Honor Wrestling. Wrestlers portrayed heroes (faces) or villains (heels) as they followed a series of events that built tension and culminated in a wrestling match or series of matches.

== Results ==
=== Night 1 (PPV) ===
No.	Results	Stipulations	Times
1^{D}	Will Ferrara defeated Shaheem Ali	Singles match	—
2	Jay White defeated Kenny King (with Caprice Coleman)	Singles match	09:58
3	Frankie Kazarian defeated Cheeseburger, Chris Sabin, Hangman Page, Punishment Martinez and Silas Young	Six-man mayhem match to determine the number one contender for the ROH World Television Championship	10:16
4	Jay Lethal defeated Bobby Fish	Singles match	15:12
5	The Kingdom (Matt Taven, T. K. O'Ryan and Vinny Marseglia) (c) defeated Dalton Castle and The Boys (Boy 1 and Boy 2)	Six-man tag team match for the ROH World Six-Man Tag Team Championship	07:55
6	Marty Scurll (c) defeated Lio Rush by submission	Singles match for the ROH World Television Championship	18:37
7	The Briscoes (Jay Briscoe and Mark Briscoe) and Bully Ray defeated War Machine (Hanson and Raymond Rowe) and Davey Boy Smith Jr.	Six-man tag team match	11:49
8	The Hardys (Jeff Hardy and Matt Hardy) (c) defeated Roppongi Vice (Beretta and Rocky Romero) and The Young Bucks (Matt Jackson and Nick Jackson)	Las Vegas Street Fight for the ROH World Tag Team Championship	17:17
9	Christopher Daniels defeated Adam Cole (c)	Singles match for the ROH World Championship	21:55
(c) / – the champion(s) heading into the match; D / – this was a dark match

=== Night 2 (TV Tapings) ===
No.	Results	Stipulations
1	Raymond Rowe defeated Davey Boy Smith Jr.	Singles match
2	Marty Scurll (c) defeated Kenny King (with Caprice Coleman)	Singles match for the ROH World Television Championship
3	Punishment Martinez defeated Hanson	Singles match
4	The Briscoes (Jay Briscoe and Mark Briscoe) and Bully Ray defeated The Kingdom (Matt Taven and Vinny Marseglia) and Silas Young (c)	Six-man tag team match for the ROH World Six-Man Tag Team Championship
5	Chris Sabin defeated Caprice Coleman (with Kenny King)	Singles match
6	Roppongi Vice (Beretta and Rocky Romero) defeated Cheeseburger and Will Ferrara	Tag team match
7	Hangman Page, Jay Lethal, Jay White and Silas Young defeated Bobby Fish, Colt Cabana, Hanson and Lio Rush	Eight-man tag team match
8	The Hardys (Jeff Hardy and Matt Hardy) (c) defeated The Briscoes (Jay Briscoe and Mark Briscoe)	Tag team match for the ROH World Tag Team Championship
9	The Addiction (Christopher Daniels and Frankie Kazarian) and Dalton Castle defeated Bullet Club (Adam Cole, Matt Jackson and Nick Jackson)	Six-man tag team match
(c) / – the champion(s) heading into the match

== See also ==
- 2017 in professional wrestling
