= Second City Saints =

Professional wrestling stable

Stable
- Members: CM Punk; Colt Cabana; Ace Steel; Lucy; Traci Brooks
- Hometown: Chicago, Illinois
- Debut: March 22, 2003
- Disbanded: July 29, 2006

The Second City Saints was an American professional wrestling stable in Ring of Honor, consisting of CM Punk, Colt Cabana and Ace Steel, consisting of all three members representing Chicago, Illinois. They were also managed sporadically by Lucy and Traci Brooks.

The group was formed in 2003 and would feud with Raven, The Prophecy and Generation Next before CM Punk left ROH to wrestle in World Wrestling Entertainment in August 2005. Following Punk's departure, Cabana and Steel teamed together one other time as the Second City Saints, when they competed in a losing effort against Jimmy Rave and Sal Rinauro of The Embassy. Second City Saints enjoyed huge championship success in ROH as Punk held the ROH World Championship once and Punk and Cabana won the Tag Team Championship twice.

== History ==
=== Ring of Honor ===
==== Formation (2003) ====
At Expect The Unexpected on March 15, 2003, CM Punk began feuding with the debuting Raven over the former's straight edge lifestyle and the latter's alcohol and drug addiction, leading to Punk defeating Raven in a Raven's Rules match. The following week, at Night of Champions, Punk teamed with his trainer Ace Steel to take on Raven and Colt Cabana, another trainee of Steel and Punk's former tag team partner in the independent circuit. Raven and Cabana won the match but Cabana turned on Raven after the match and joined Punk and Steel to form a stable called The Second City Saints, based on the trio all belonging to Chicago, Illinois. This would plant the seeds of a lengthy violent feud between Punk and Raven throughout the year and the group would get embroiled in the feud.

At Retribution: Round Robin Challenge II, Punk introduced his on-screen girlfriend Lucy Fer as the trio's newest valet. Also, at the event, Steel and Cabana defeated Da Hit Squad in the latter team's last match as a tag team. At Do or Die, Punk and Cabana won a four-way Scramble match. The group's feud with Raven resumed at Night of the Grudges on June 14 when Raven returned to ROH after a three-month absence and teamed with B. J. Whitmer to take on Punk and Cabana in a no disqualification match, which Punk and Cabana won. At Wrestlerave '03, Punk and Cabana defeated the team of Christopher Daniels and Raven. Punk would then defeat Raven in a dog collar match at Death Before Dishonor. At Wrath of the Racket, Steel and Cabana defeated Alex Shelley and Jimmy Jacobs in a tag team match. After the event, Lucy was mysteriously attacked backstage by an unknown assailant while Punk was on a tour to Japan. After Punk's feud with Raven concluded in a steel cage match at The Conclusion, the Second City Saints began feuding with The Prophecy as Punk suspected Prophecy to be Lucy's assailants in order to maintain their spot as ROH's top group. This was in done in actuality to explain Lucy's departure from ROH.

The feud continued the following night at War of the Wire where Prophecy leader Christopher Daniels refused to provide any information on Lucy's disappearance which led to Punk attacking him. At Final Battle, Second City Saints attacked Prophecy and threatened to kill Allison Danger if Punk was not provided any information about Lucy's disappearance. Dan Maff swore on his father's grave that Prophecy was not behind the attack until Daniels revealed that B. J. Whitmer was the assailant which further fueled the feud between the two groups. Later at the event, Punk and Cabana defeated Turmeric Storm (Kazushi Miyamoto and Tomoaki Honma) in a tag team match.

==== Tag Team Champions (2004) ====
At The Battle Lines Are Drawn on January 10, 2004, Traci Brooks joined the Second City Saints as the group's newest valet. Later at the event, the Second City Saints took on The Prophecy's Christopher Daniels, B. J. Whitmer and Dan Maff in a six-man tag team match. After knocking out Whitmer and Maff, the Saints injured Daniels as Steel and Cabana assisted Punk in delivering a Pepsi Plunge to Daniels off the top rope onto a table. With Daniels' absence, the feud continued between Saints and Prophecy as Steel and Cabana took on Whitmer and Maff in a tag team match at At Our Best. The match ended in a no contest after a brawl broke out as Whitmer and Maff hit Steel and Cabana with chairs and severely injured them. The feud continued at Reborn: Stage One, where Cabana lost to Whitmer in singles competition.

At Reborn: Stage Two, Steel lost to Whitmer in a singles match while Punk and Cabana defeated Briscoe Brothers (Jay Briscoe and Mark Briscoe) in the main event to win their first ROH Tag Team Championship. The following month, at Round Robin Challenge III, Second City Saints lost the titles to Maff and Whitmer in the first match of a round-robin series. However, after Briscoes defeated Maff and Whitmer for the titles, Saints defeated Briscoes later that night to win their second Tag Team Championship. All three teams won each match once which resulted in the series ending in a tie. At Generation Next, Saints defeated Prophecy in a no disqualification match to retain the titles. At World Title Classic, Punk challenged Samoa Joe for the ROH World Championship in a match that ended in a sixty-minute time limit draw. Later at the event, Steel and Cabana competed against Prophecy, Briscoe Brothers and Generation Next in an Ultimate Endurance match. Prophecy won the match.

At Survival of the Fittest, Cabana participated in the Survival of the Fittest tournament while Punk single handedly retained the Tag Team Championship against Special K, The Outcast Killaz and Ring Crew Express in a Scramble match. Following the event, Second City Saints continued their feud with The Prophecy as Whitmer and Maff defeated Steel and Cabana in a falls count anywhere match at Reborn: Completion. During the first night of Death Before Dishonor II, Punk and Cabana successfully defended the Tag Team Championship against Briscoe Brothers in a two out of three falls match. On the second night of the event, Cabana unsuccessfully challenged Samoa Joe for the ROH World Championship while Punk and Steel defeated Prophecy in an Unsanctioned Chicago Street Fight. At Testing The Limit, Punk and Cabana lost the titles to Havana Pitbulls.

=== World Wrestling Entertainment (2007–2008) ===
All three teammates were signed to World Wrestling Entertainment (with CM Punk being a member of the ECW brand and Ace Steel and Colt Cabana wrestling in Ohio Valley Wrestling) until February 4, 2008, when Steel was released. Cabana and Punk remained signed and briefly reunited the Saints at the final OVW show promoted under the WWE developmental banner. Punk wrestled for WWE until January 2014, when he left the company and stayed away from professional wrestling for the next 7 years, until August 20, 2021, when he made a return arriving in All Elite Wrestling (AEW). Cabana was previously a member of WWE's Smackdown roster under the name Scotty Goldman, however he was released in 2009 . He and Punk were also seen working out together prior to WrestleMania on a WWE.com feature.

In 2004, Ring of Honor released Chicago's Elite: The Best of the Second City Saints.

At the 2011 Money in the Bank, there was an unofficial reunion of the group. Both Cabana and Steel were sitting front row in support of Punk who was facing John Cena for the WWE Championship in the main event. Cabana and Steel were shown on camera multiple times.

== Championships and accomplishments ==
- Ring of Honor
  - ROH Tag Team Championship (2 times) – CM Punk and Colt Cabana
  - ROH World Championship (1 time) – CM Punk
