= 10th Anniversary Show =

10th Anniversary Show may refer to:

- EMLL 10th Anniversary Show
- 10th Anniversary Show: Young Wolves Rising
