= ReDRagon =

Professional wrestling tag team

reDRagon
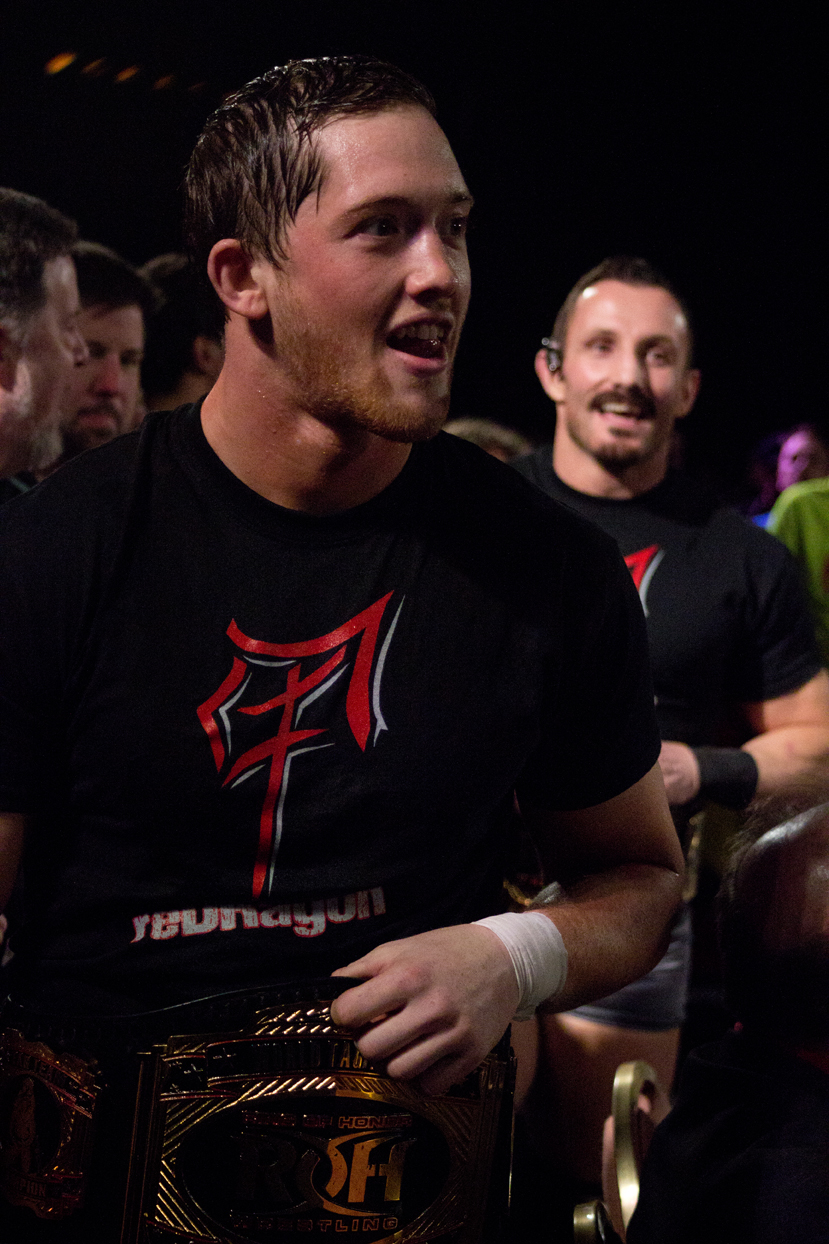
- O'Reilly (front) and Fish (back) as the ROH World Tag Team Champions

Tag team
- Members: Bobby Fish; Kyle O'Reilly
- Name(s): Bobby Fish and Kyle O'Reilly reDRagon; The Undisputed Elite; The Undisputed Era; The Elite
- Billed heights: 5 ft 10 in (1.78 m) – Fish; 6 ft 0 in (1.83 m) – O'Reilly
- Combined billed weight: 397 lb (180 kg); Fish (197 lb), O'Reilly (200 lb)
- Debut: November 3, 2012
- Disbanded: September 1, 2022
- Years active: 2012–2022

reDRagon was a professional wrestling tag team consisting of Bobby Fish and Kyle O'Reilly, formed in 2012, and lasting until September 1, 2022 when Fish quietly left All Elite Wrestling (AEW). They are also known for their work in Ring of Honor (ROH), New Japan Pro-Wrestling (NJPW), and WWE. In WWE, they wrestled together under the name The Undisputed Era, as a stable with Adam Cole; the three formed the stable as The Undisputed Elite after leaving WWE, although Fish and O'Reilly had resumed using the named reDRagon when working as a duo.

Fish and O'Reilly first became known for their work in ROH, where they are three-time ROH World Tag Team Champions and the winners of the 2014 ROH Tag Wars Tournament. In parallel, they appeared in other promotions, including in NJPW, where they are two-time IWGP Junior Heavyweight Tag Team Champions, and the winners of the 2014 Super Jr. Tag Tournament. In WWE, they are two-time NXT Tag Team Champions (with their first reign being shared by Adam Cole and Roderick Strong). The team quietly disbanded on September 1, 2022, when Bobby Fish’s AEW contract wasn’t renewed.

== History ==
=== Ring of Honor (2012–2017) ===
On December 16, 2012, at Final Battle 2012: Doomsday, Kyle O'Reilly and Bobby Fish (known as reDRagon) faced the reformed American Wolves (Davey Richards and Eddie Edwards) in a losing effort. At the following iPPV, 11th Anniversary Show on March 2, 2013, O'Reilly and Fish defeated the Briscoe Brothers (Jay and Mark Briscoe) for the ROH World Tag Team Championship. In the same month, they successfully defended the championship against Alabama Attitude (Corey Hollis and Mike Posey) before retaining it at Best in the World in June in a three-way match against the C & C Wrestle Factory (Caprice Coleman and Cedric Alexander) and S.C.U.M. (Cliff Compton and Rhett Titus). They lost the title to the Forever Hooligans (Alex Koslov and Rocky Romero) on July 27 but regained the title from the American Wolves on August 17. Over the next several months, reDRagon successfully defended the championship against teams including the C & C Wrestle Factory, the Forever Hooligans, and Jay Lethal and Michael Elgin. They retained the championship against Outlaw, Inc. (Homicide and Eddie Kingston) at Final Battle in December and Adrenaline Rush (A. C. H. and TaDarius Thomas) at the 12th Anniversary Show in February 2014. On March 8, 2014, reDRagon lost the title to The Young Bucks (Matt and Nick Jackson). ReDRagon regained the ROH World Tag Team Championship from The Young Bucks on May 17 at the ROH and New Japan Pro-Wrestling (NJPW) co-promoted pay-per-view War of the Worlds. They successfully defended the championship against The Briscoe Brothers on June 7. On June 22, at Best in the World, reDRagon defeated The Addiction (Christopher Daniels and Frankie Kazarian) to retain the ROH World Tag Team Championship.

On November 23, 2014, reDRagon defeated A. C. H. and Matt Sydal, The Addiction and The Briscoes to retain the ROH World Tag Team Championship and win the Tag Wars tournament. Their victory was followed by successful title defenses against the Time Splitters (Alex Shelley and Kushida) at the Final Battle and The Young Bucks at ROH's 13th Anniversary Show in March 2015. At Supercard of Honor IX, they retained the championship against The Kingdom (Matt Taven and Michael Bennett). Fish and O'Reilly lost the tag team title to The Addiction at the Ring of Honor Wrestling tapings on April 4. After losing the tag titles, both men moved into singles feuds with O'Reilly feuding with former Future Shock partner Adam Cole while Fish attempted to capture the ROH World Television Championship. At Final Battle, O'Reilly lost to Cole while Fish lost to Roderick Strong, failing to capture the ROH Television Title. At the 14th Anniversary Show, both men competed in triple threat matches for championships, Fish facing Strong and Tomohiro Ishii for the ROH TV title, while O'Reilly faced Jay Lethal and Adam Cole for the ROH World Championship; however, both Fish and O'Reilly failed to capture the titles.

At Global Wars, O'Reilly lost to the IWGP Heavyweight Champion Tetsuya Naito while Fish captured the ROH TV Title by beating Ishii.

=== Independent circuit (2014–2017) ===
On May 30, 2014, reDRagon unsuccessfully challenged Team Single (Rampage Brown & T-Bone) for the PCW Tag Team Championships. The following night reDRagon defeated Legion Of Boom (Chris Masters & Dave Rayne), and later that night defeated Project Lucha (El Ligero & Martin Kirby). On August 30, 2014, reDRagon made their Pro Wrestling Guerrilla debut, defeating Biff Busick and Drew Gulak. On October 12, 2014, reDRagon were defeated by Moose and Uhaa Nation via disqualification at HRW Here Comes The Pain. On December 28, 2014, reDRagon defeated The Colony (Fire Ant and Silver Ant) to win the HRW Tag Team Championships.

=== New Japan Pro-Wrestling (2014–2016) ===
Through ROH's relationship with NJPW, reDRagon made an appearance for the Japanese promotion on August 10, unsuccessfully challenging Time Splitters for the IWGP Junior Heavyweight Tag Team Championship. reDRagon returned to NJPW on October 25 to take part in the 2014 Super Jr. Tag Tournament. On November 3, reDRagon defeated The Young Bucks in the finals to win the tournament. Five days later at Power Struggle, reDRagon defeated Time Splitters in a rematch to become the new IWGP Junior Heavyweight Tag Team Champions. They made their first successful title defense on January 4, 2015, at Wrestle Kingdom 9 in Tokyo Dome, in a four-way match against Forever Hooligans, Time Splitters and The Young Bucks. On February 11 at The New Beginning in Osaka, reDRagon lost the title to The Young Bucks in a three-way match, also involving Time Splitters. reDRagon returned to NJPW on May 3 at Wrestling Dontaku 2015, where they unsuccessfully challenged for the IWGP Junior Heavyweight Tag Team Championship in a three-way match with Roppongi Vice (Beretta and Rocky Romero) and The Young Bucks. Another three-way title match took place on July 5 at Dominion 7.5 in Osaka-jo Hall and saw The Young Bucks retain their title. On August 16, reDRagon defeated The Young Bucks to win the IWGP Junior Heavyweight Tag Team Championship for the second time. They lost the title back to The Young Bucks in a four-way match on January 4, 2016, at Wrestle Kingdom 10 in Tokyo Dome.

=== WWE (2017–2021) ===
On the July 12, 2017, episode of NXT, Fish made his NXT debut, losing to Aleister Black. On the August 2 NXT, O'Reilly made his NXT debut, also losing to Black. At NXT TakeOver: Brooklyn III on August 19, Fish and O'Reilly debuted as a team, attacking the newly crowned NXT Tag Team Champions, Sanity (Alexander Wolfe and Eric Young), as well as their opponents for the night, The Authors of Pain (Akam and Rezar). Later that night, the two aligned themselves with Adam Cole and attacked newly crowned NXT Champion Drew McIntyre. The following month, the trio of Cole, Fish and O'Reilly was officially dubbed "The Undisputed Era", with Fish and O'Reilly now dropping the "reDRagon" name.

At NXT TakeOver: WarGames, the Undisputed Era defeated Sanity and The Authors of Pain and Roderick Strong in a WarGames match, the first of its kind in 20 years. On the December 20 episode of NXT, (taped on November 29), Fish and O'Reilly defeated Sanity (Eric Young and Killian Dain) to capture the NXT Tag Team Championship, marking their first title win in WWE. The following week, the Undisputed Era cost Aleister Black a number one contender's fatal-four way match for the NXT Championship, thus beginning a feud with Black. On January 10, 2018, episode of NXT, Fish and O'Reilly were scheduled to defend their titles against Sanity in a rematch, but assaulted them along with Cole backstage, rendering them unable to compete. Later that night, they were forced to defend their championships against Black and Roderick Strong by NXT general manager William Regal, and successfully retained their titles after Cole interfered and distracted Black. After the match, they attacked Black. At NXT TakeOver: Philadelphia, The Undisputed Era defeated The Authors of Pain to retain the titles. On March 4, Fish suffered a torn ACL and torn MCL in his left knee at an NXT live event, forcing him to vacate his half of the NXT Tag Team Championship. He later underwent surgery and was out of action for six months. Cole replaced Fish following his injury and the Undisputed Era's reign continued due to the Freebird Rule.

O'Reilly and Cole successfully defended the NXT Tag Team Championships at NXT TakeOver: New Orleans against the Authors of Pain and Roderick Strong and Pete Dunne. At the end of the match, Strong turned on his partner Dunne, and joined The Undisputed Era, turning heel (for the first time in WWE) in the process. The next morning at WrestleMania Axxess, Strong teamed with O'Reilly to defend the NXT Tag Team Championships, making him a champion via the Freebird Rule. O'Reilly and Strong later lost their titles to Moustache Mountain (Tyler Bate and Trent Seven). On August 6, 2021, Bobby Fish was released from the WWE but signed with All Elite Wrestling and Kyle O'Reilly departed on December 10, 2021, when his contract expired.

=== All Elite Wrestling (2021–2022) ===
At the Holiday Bash edition of AEW Dynamite on December 22, 2021, O'Reilly debuted for the promotion as a "surprise" that Cole and Fish had teased the prior week, assisting Cole in defeating Orange Cassidy, and reuniting reDRagon as a sub-group of The Elite. On the following Dynamite on December 29, reDragon made their AEW in-ring debut in a trios match with Cole against the Best Friends. On the February 23, 2022, episode of Dynamite, reDRagon won a 10-team battle royal to become the number one contenders for the AEW Tag Team Championship at AEW Revolution. ReDRagon went on to lose the match. At the same event, which was held on March 6, 2022, reDRagon unsuccessfully assisted Adam Cole in his AEW World Championship match against defending champion Adam Page. On August 31 it was reported that Bobby Fish’s contract with AEW expired and left the promotion, thus disbanding the team for the first time.

== Championships and accomplishments ==
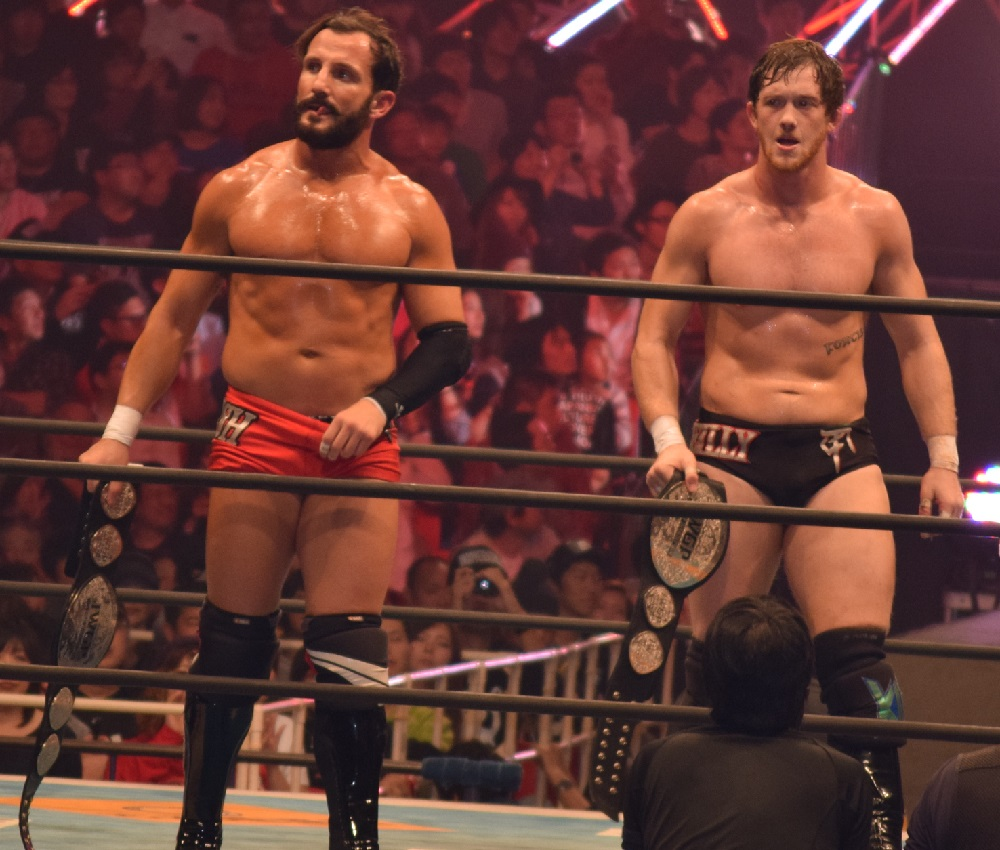
reDRagon are two-time IWGP Junior Heavyweight Tag Team Champions.

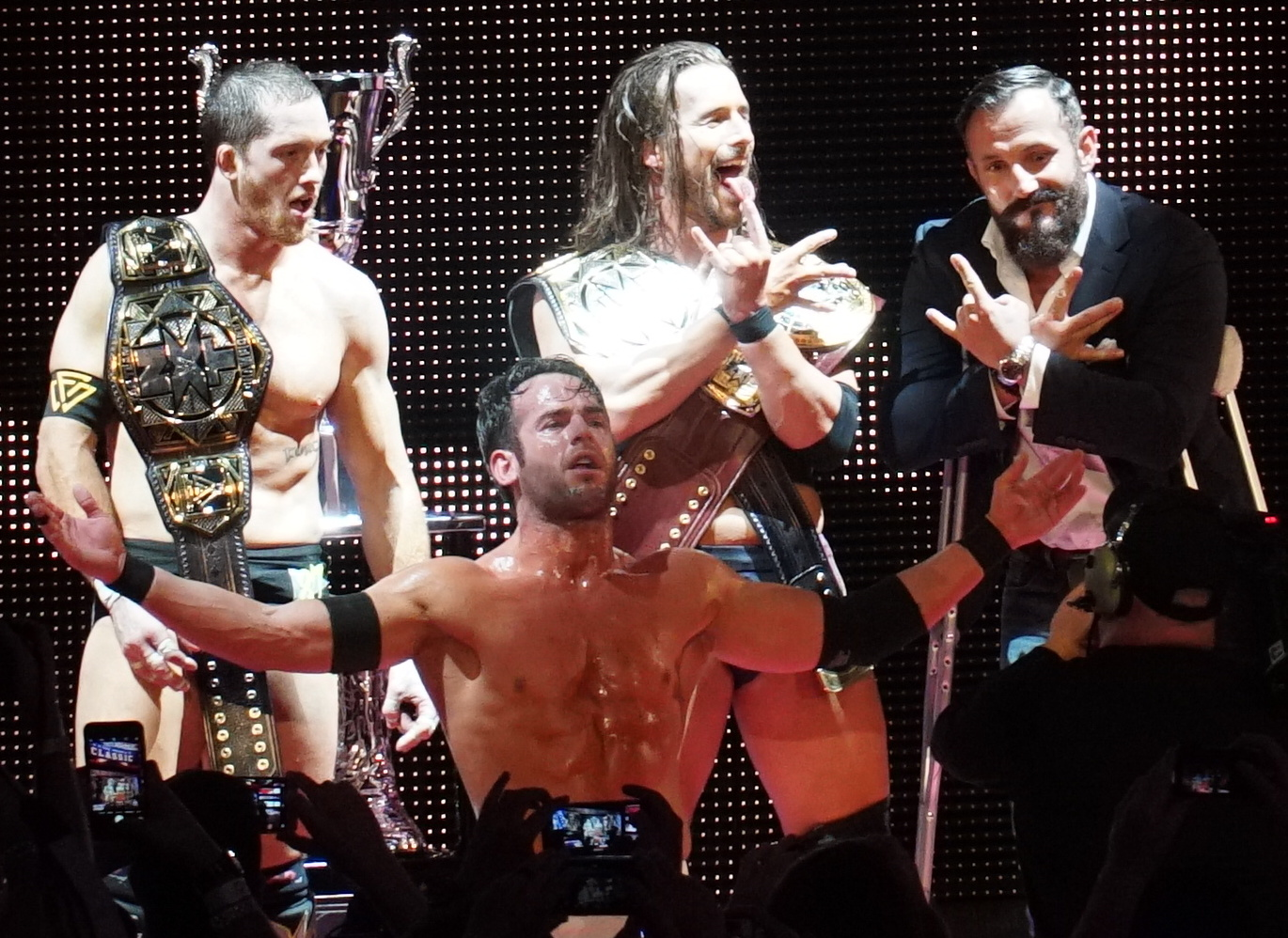
As members of The Undisputed Era, O'Reilly (left) and Fish (right) are two-time NXT Tag Team Champions as a duo.

- All Elite Wrestling
  - Casino Battle Royale (2022 - Men's) – O'Reilly
- High Risk Wrestling
  - HRW Tag Team Championship (1 time)
- New Japan Pro-Wrestling
  - IWGP Junior Heavyweight Tag Team Championship (2 times)
  - Super Jr. Tag Tournament (2014)
- Pro Wrestling Guerrilla
  - PWG World Championship (1 time) – O'Reilly
- Pro Wrestling Illustrated
  - Tag Team of the Year (2019)
  - PWI ranked Fish No. 26 of the top 500 singles wrestlers in the PWI 500 in 2016
  - PWI ranked O'Reilly No. 32 of the top 500 singles wrestlers in the PWI 500 in 2016
- Ring of Honor
  - ROH World Championship (1 time) – O'Reilly
  - ROH World Tag Team Championship (3 times)
  - ROH World Television Championship (1 time) – Fish
  - Tag Wars Tournament (2014)
  - Survival of the Fittest (2016) – Fish
- WWE
  - NXT Tag Team Championship (2 times) – with Adam Cole and Roderick Strong (1)^{1}
  - NXT Year-End Award (1 time)
    - Tag Team of the Year (2019)

^{1}On their first reign, Fish and O'Reilly won the title as a duo, with Cole and Strong later being recognized as co-champions under the Freebird Rule.
