= ROH 16th Anniversary Show =

2018 Ring of Honor pay-per-view

- Official event poster featuring Dalton Castle
- Promotion: Ring of Honor
- Date: March 9, 2018 (PPV); March 10, 2018 (TV tapings)
- City: Sunrise Manor, Nevada
- Venue: Sam's Town Hotel and Gambling Hall

Pay-per-view chronology
← Previous; Final Battle	Next → Supercard of Honor XII

ROH Anniversary Show chronology
← Previous; 15th Anniversary	Next → 17th Anniversary

ROH 16th Anniversary was a two-night professional wrestling event produced by American promotion Ring of Honor (ROH), which took place Friday, March 9 and Saturday March 10, 2018, at the Sam's Town Hotel and Gambling Hall in the Las Vegas suburb of Sunrise Manor, Nevada. Friday's show was a pay-per-view broadcast, while Saturday's was a set of tapings for ROH's flagship program Ring of Honor Wrestling.

== Production ==
Other on-screen personnel
Role	Name
Commentators	Colt Cabana
Commentators	Ian Riccaboni
Commentators	Deonna Purrazzo
Commentators	Mandy Leon

=== Storylines ===
This professional wrestling event featured professional wrestling matches, which involve different wrestlers from pre-existing scripted feuds, plots, and storylines. Wrestlers portray villains or heroes as they follow a series of events that build tension and culminate in a wrestling match or series of matches.

== Results ==
=== Night 1 (PPV) ===
No.	Results	Stipulations	Times
1^{P}	Sumie Sakai defeated Hana Kimura (with Kagetsu)	First round match in the Women of Honor Championship Tournament	8:01
2^{P}	Tenille Dashwood defeated Brandi Rhodes	Quarter-final match in the Women of Honor Championship Tournament	7:31
3	Hiromu Takahashi defeated Flip Gordon	Singles match	12:21
4	Marty Scurll defeated Punishment Martinez	Singles match for a future ROH World Championship match	10:43
5	Kenny King (c) defeated Silas Young	Singles match for the ROH World Television Championship	14:39
6	SoCal Uncensored (Christopher Daniels, Frankie Kazarian and Scorpio Sky) defeated The Hung Bucks (Adam Page, Matt Jackson and Nick Jackson) (c)	Las Vegas Street Fight for the ROH World Six-Man Tag Team Championship	18:50
7	Cody defeated Matt Taven	Singles match	14:14
8	The Briscoes (Jay Briscoe and Mark Briscoe) defeated The Motor City Machine Guns (Alex Shelley and Chris Sabin) (c)	Tag team match for the ROH World Tag Team Championship	13:41
9	Dalton Castle (c) defeated Jay Lethal	Singles match for the ROH World Championship	26:04
(c) / – the champion(s) heading into the match; P / – the match was broadcast on the pre-show

=== Night 2 (TV Tapings) ===
No.	Results	Stipulations
1^{D}	Manny Lemons defeated Shane Alden	Singles match
2	Kelly Klein defeated Mandy Leon	Quarter-final match in the Women of Honor Championship Tournament
3	Bullet Club (Marty Scurll and Adam Page) defeated The Boys	Tag team match
4	Flip Gordon defeated Scorpio Sky	Singles match
5	Sumie Sakai defeated Kagetsu	Quarter-final match in the Women of Honor Championship Tournament
6	The Briscoes (Jay Briscoe and Mark Briscoe) defeated Dalton Castle and Kenny King	Tag team match
7	Cheeseburger vs. Kikutaro ended in a no contest	Singles match
8	Mayu Iwatani defeated Deonna Purrazzo	Quarter-final match in the Women of Honor Championship Tournament
9	Punishment Martinez defeated Shane Taylor	Singles match
10	Jay Lethal defeated Caprice Coleman	Singles match
11	Matt Taven defeated Christopher Daniels and Cody	Three-way match
12	Hiromu Takahashi defeated Frankie Kazarian	Singles match
13	The Young Bucks (Matt Jackson and Nick Jackson) defeated Coast 2 Coast (LSG and Shaheem Ali), Beer City Bruiser and Brian Milonas, The Dawgs (Rhett Titus and Will Ferrara), Motor City Machine Guns (Alex Shelley and Chris Sabin) and The Kingdom (T. K. O'Ryan and Vinny Marseglia)	Tag team gauntlet match
D / – this was a dark match

== See also ==
- 2018 in professional wrestling
- List of Ring of Honor pay-per-view events
