= ROH 11th Anniversary Show =

2013 Ring of Honor pay-per-view event

11th Anniversary Show
- Promotion: Ring of Honor
- Date: March 2, 2013
- City: Chicago Ridge, Illinois
- Venue: Frontier Fieldhouse
- Attendance: 700

Pay-per-view chronology
← Previous; Final Battle	Next → Supercard of Honor VII

ROH Anniversary Show chronology
← Previous; 10th Anniversary	Next → 12th Anniversary

11th Anniversary Show was the 11th ROH Anniversary Show professional wrestling Internet pay-per-view (iPPV) event produced by Ring of Honor (ROH). It took place on March 2, 2013, at the Frontier Fieldhouse in Chicago Ridge, Illinois.

== Production ==
Other on-screen personnel
Role	Name
Commentators	Kevin Kelly
Commentators	Caleb Seltzer
Commentators	Matt Hardy

=== Storylines ===
The 11th Anniversary Show featured professional wrestling matches, which involved different wrestlers from pre-existing scripted feuds, plots, and storylines that played out on ROH's television programs. Wrestlers portrayed villains or heroes as they followed a series of events that built tension and culminated in a wrestling match or series of matches.

== Results ==
No.	Results	Stipulations	Times
1^{D}	Grizzly Redwood defeated Darren Dean	Singles match	—
2	A. C. H. defeated Q. T. Marshall (with R.D. Evans), Adam Page, Silas Young, Mike Sydal and TaDarius Thomas	Six-man mayhem match	7:03
3	S.C.U.M. (Jimmy Jacobs and Steve Corino) defeated Caprice Coleman and Cedric Alexander	Tag team match	8:33
4	B. J. Whitmer defeated Charlie Haas	No Holds Barred match	12:03
5	The American Wolves (Davey Richards and Eddie Edwards) defeated The Forever Hooligans (Alex Koslov and Rocky Romero)	Tag team match	15:40
6	Michael Elgin defeated Roderick Strong	Two out of three falls match; Truth Martini was banned from ringside	17:38
7	Matt Taven (with Truth Martini) defeated Adam Cole (c)	Singles match for the ROH World Television Championship	13:35
8	reDRagon (Bobby Fish and Kyle O'Reilly) defeated The Briscoe Brothers (Jay Briscoe and Mark Briscoe) (c)	Tag team match for the ROH World Tag Team Championship	15:14
9	Kevin Steen (c) defeated Jay Lethal	Singles match for the ROH World Championship	20:50
(c) / – the champion(s) heading into the match; D / – this was a dark match
