= All Night Express =

Professional wrestling tag team

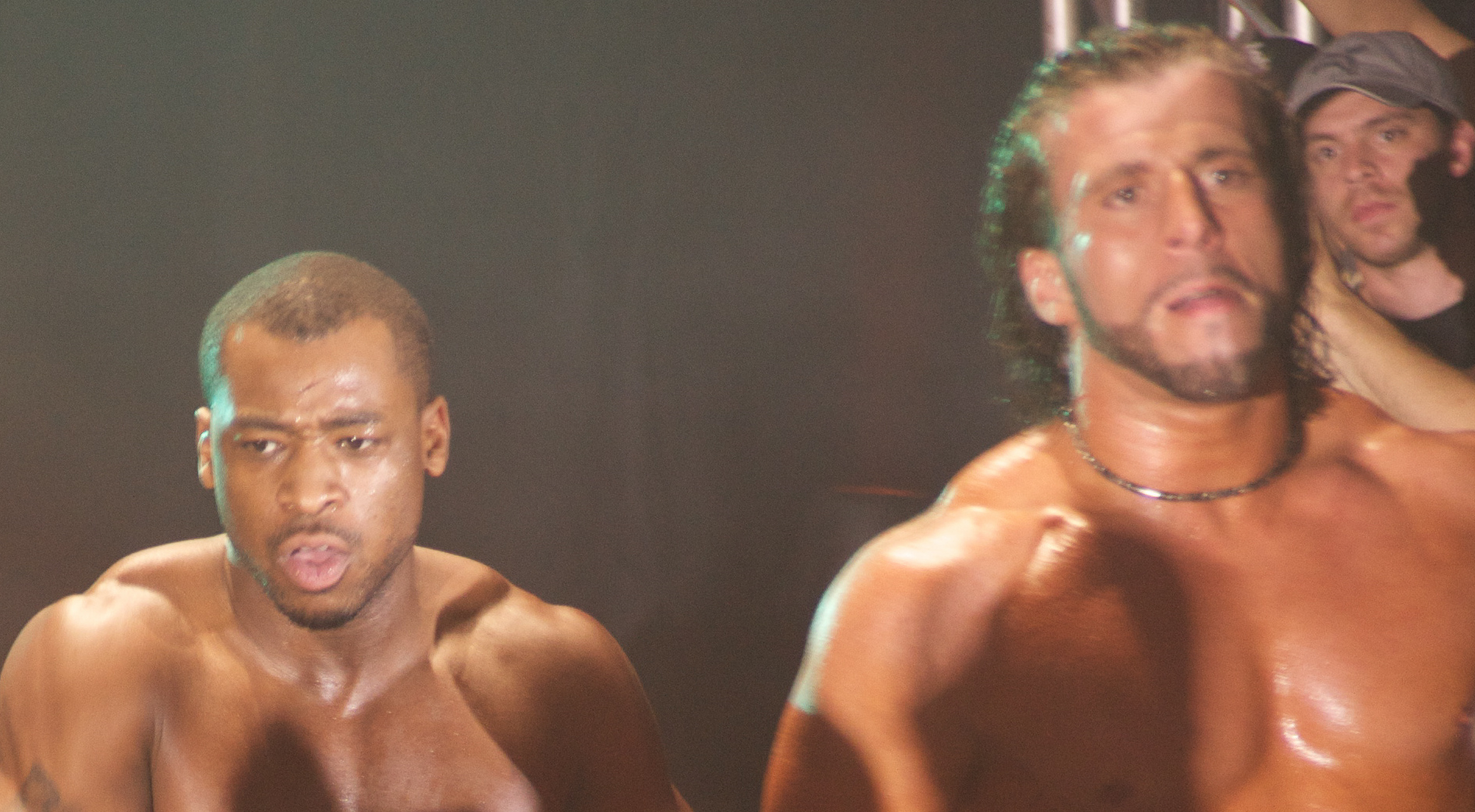
- King (left) and Titus (right)

Tag team
- Members: Rhett Titus; Kenny King
- Name(s): The All Night Express; Rhett Titus & Kenny King
- Debut: January 13, 2009
- Disbanded: June 23, 2017
- Years active: 2009–2012; 2015–2017

The All Night Express (usually abbreviated ANX) was a professional wrestling tag team that primarily performed in Ring of Honor. The tag team consisted of Rhett Titus and Kenny King, who are former one-time ROH World Tag Team Champions.

== History ==
On January 13, 2009 at The French Connection show, Kenny King tagged with Kenny Omega to face The Briscoe Brothers, but abandoned Omega halfway during the match, when Rhett Titus came to ringside. Titus and King left together, showing a new alliance between them. Over the next few months, Titus and King competed both in singles and tag team competition, and unsuccessfully challenged Kevin Steen and El Generico for the ROH World Tag Team Championship at Insanity Unleashed. At Steel City Clash, Titus and King revealed their alliance with Austin Aries, when they attacked Aries' former allies, Erick Stevens and Matt Cross, with Aries becoming a mentor to Titus and King.

The team garnered a second shot at the ROH World Tag Championship on ROH's television program, Ring of Honor Wrestling, and picked up a series of wins during the Double Feature II tour of Canada, and at the Never Say Die and Validation shows.

At the Ring of Honor Wrestling tapings on August 15, 2009, King beat Jerry Lynn. After the match, Titus and King attacked Lynn, and performed a spike piledriver on Lynn, removing Lynn from active competition. He and Titus defeated The Young Bucks at Clash Of The Contenders.

On December 18 at Final Battle 2010 the All Night Express defeated Adam Cole and Kyle O'Reilly, announcing their intention of becoming ROH World Tag Team Champions in 2011. On February 26, 2011, at 9th Anniversary Show, Titus and King failed in their first attempt to win the ROH World Tag Team Championship, when they were defeated by The Kings of Wrestling (Chris Hero and Claudio Castagnoli). During the program with the Kings of Wrestling, Titus and King showed signs of a face turn and finalized their turn on March 19 at Manhattan Mayhem IV, after defeating the Briscoe Brothers. However, in a bloody rematch at the second show of Honor Takes Center Stage, The Briscoe Brothers won. On September 17 at Death Before Dishonor IX, the All Night Express defeated the Briscoe Brothers in a ladder match to become the number one contenders to the ROH World Tag Team Championship. On June 24 at Best in the World 2012: Hostage Crisis, Titus and King defeated Wrestling's Greatest Tag Team (Charlie Haas and Shelton Benjamin) to win the ROH World Tag Team Championship for the first time. After making an appearance for TNA, ROH severed its ties with King on July 5 and five days later officially stripped him and Titus of the ROH World Tag Team Championship. Titus would remain in ROH during this time, adopting a masked comedy persona The Romantic Touch.

King made a surprise return to ROH on September 18, 2015, at All Star Extravaganza VII, reuniting with Titus in a tag team match, where they defeated the Briscoe Brothers. At ROH 14th Anniversary Show All Night Express was defeated by War Machine (Hanson and Raymond Rowe) in a No Disqualification tag team match for the ROH World Tag Team Championship.

In 2016, they formed "The Cabinet" with Caprice Coleman and vowed to "make wrestling great again". On ROH TV The Cabinet defeated Jason Kincaid, Leon St. Giovanni and Shaheem Ali in the first round of the ROH World Six-Man Tag Team Championship. They was defeated by A. C. H., Jay White and Kushida in the second round. The Cabinet was originally portrayed as something not be taken seriously, but in late 2016, the trio turned serious and renamed themselves "The Rebellion", eventually also adding Shane Taylor as a member. The Rebellion remained together until June 2017, when they were defeated by Search and Destroy in a match, where the losing team had to disband.

Following the dissolution of the Rebellion, Titus formed a new tag team named "The Dawgs" with Will Ferrara, while King went solo, winning the ROH World Television Championship.

== Championships and accomplishments ==
- Ring of Honor
  - ROH World Tag Team Championship (1 time)
