= ROH 13th Anniversary Show =

2015 Ring of Honorpay-per-view event

13th Anniversary Show
- Official promotional poster for the ROH 13th Anniversary PPV.
- Promotion: Ring of Honor
- Date: March 1, 2015
- City: Paradise, Nevada
- Venue: The Orleans
- Attendance: 1,000+
- Tagline: "Winner Takes All"

Pay-per-view chronology
← Previous; Final Battle	Next → Supercard of Honor IX

ROH Anniversary Show chronology
← Previous; 12th Anniversary	Next → 14th Anniversary

13th Anniversary Show was the 13th ROH Anniversary Show professional wrestling pay-per-view event produced by Ring of Honor (ROH), which took place on March 1, 2015 at The Orleans, a hotel and casino in the Las Vegas-area community of Paradise, Nevada. This event was the third live pay-per-view for ROH.

== Production ==
Other on-screen personnel
Role:	Name:
Commentators	Kevin Kelly
Commentators	Steve Corino
Commentators	Jimmy Jacobs
Commentators	Rocky Romero
Commentators	Nigel McGuinness

=== Storylines ===
This professional wrestling event featured nine professional wrestling matches, which involved different wrestlers from pre-existing scripted feuds, plots, and storylines that played out on ROH's television programs. Wrestlers portrayed villains or heroes as they followed a series of events that built tension and culminated in a wrestling match or series of matches.

The card also featured wrestlers from ROH's international partner New Japan Pro-Wrestling, with which they have a talent exchange agreement.

Former ROH wrestler and ROH World Champion Samoa Joe made his return to the promotion during the pay-per-view event.

Ray Rowe returned from his injury doing a run-in during the main event.

== Results ==
No.	Results	Stipulations	Times
1^{D}	The Decade (Adam Page and Jimmy Jacobs) defeated Reno Scum (Adam Thornstowe and Luster The Legend).	Tag team match	06:35
2	Matt Sydal defeated Cedric Alexander	Singles match	09:38
3	Moose (with Stokely Hathaway and Veda Scott) defeated Mark Briscoe	Singles match	05:15
4	The Kingdom (Michael Bennett and Matt Taven) defeated Karl Anderson and Doc Gallows and The Addiction (Christopher Daniels and Frankie Kazarian) (Note: Doc Gallows was scheduled to wrestle as Anderson's tag team partner, but could not make the event due to travel issues.)	Three-way tag team match	11:58
5	Roderick Strong defeated B. J. Whitmer (with Adam Page and Jimmy Jacobs)	Singles match	10:57
6	ODB (with Mark Briscoe) defeated Maria Kanellis (with Michael Bennett)	Women of Honor Singles match	05:20
7	A.J. Styles defeated A. C. H.	Singles match	15:30
8	reDRagon (Bobby Fish and Kyle O'Reilly) (c) (with Shayna Baszler) defeated The Young Bucks (Matt Jackson and Nick Jackson)	Tag team match for the ROH World Tag Team Championship	15:40
9	Jay Lethal (c) (with Truth Martini and J. Diesel) defeated Alberto El Patrón	Singles match for the ROH World Television Championship	12:33
10	Jay Briscoe (c) defeated Hanson, Michael Elgin and Tommaso Ciampa	Four corner survival match for the ROH World Championship	16:21
(c) / – the champion(s) heading into the match; D / – this was a dark match
