= World's Greatest Tag Team =

Professional wrestling tag team

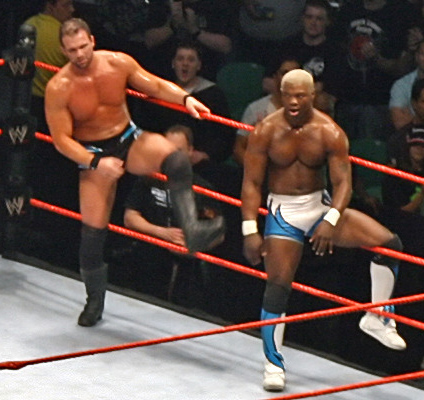
- Charlie Haas (left) and Shelton Benjamin (right) in 2007

Tag team
- Members: Shelton Benjamin; Charlie Haas
- Name(s): Team Angle; The Best Damn Tag Team Period; The World's Greatest Tag Team; Charlie Haas and Shelton Benjamin; Wrestling's Greatest Tag Team
- Billed heights: 6 ft 2 in (1.88 m) each
- Combined billed weight: 497 lb (225 kg)
- Hometown: Kurt Angle (Pittsburgh, Pennsylvania); Shelton Benjamin (Minneapolis, Minnesota); Charlie Haas (Dallas, Texas); Paul Heyman (Scarsdale, New York)
- Former members: Jackie Gayda (Valet); Paul Heyman (Manager); Kurt Angle (Leader)
- Debut: October 22, 2002
- Disbanded: June 12, 2003
- Years active: 2002–2004; 2006–2007; 2009; 2010–2013; 2014–2015
- Trained by: Ohio Valley Wrestling

The World's Greatest Tag Team was an American professional wrestling tag team, which also used the name Wrestling's Greatest Tag Team. The team consisted of Charlie Haas and Shelton Benjamin. Originally formed in World Wrestling Entertainment (WWE), they started out captained by Kurt Angle, during which time they were known as Team Angle. They also wrestled for several other independent promotions.

Haas and Benjamin made their debut on the SmackDown! brand in December 2002, and won the WWE Tag Team Championship in February 2003. After losing the championship in May, Haas and Benjamin were fired from Team Angle, and changed their name to The Best Damn Tag Team Period, before settling on The World's Greatest Tag Team. They won the championship back in July, and their second reign lasted for two months. They continued to compete on SmackDown!, until March 2004, when Benjamin was moved to the Raw brand as part of the Draft Lottery.

The team reformed in December 2006 on the Raw brand, and competed against numerous teams, although they were unsuccessful in winning the World Tag Team Championship. The team was split again in November 2007, when Benjamin moved to the ECW brand, but later reformed briefly back on SmackDown in May 2009. In 2010, the team reformed on the independent circuit, and began competing regularly for Ring of Honor (ROH), where they are former two-time ROH World Tag Team Champions.

== History ==
=== World Wrestling Entertainment ===
==== Initial run (2002–2004) ====
They formed on October 22, 2002 in a dark match on WWE Velocity as they lost to Bill DeMott and Val Venis. For a couple of months they worked their way up by competing in house shows. The tag team made their television debut on the December 26, 2002 edition of WWE's SmackDown!. Paul Heyman introduced Benjamin and Haas under the name Team Angle as a "gift" to his top client Kurt Angle. Team Angle quickly involved themselves in a rivalry with Chris Benoit and Edge, defeating them on January 30, 2003 to become the number one contenders for the WWE Tag Team Championship.

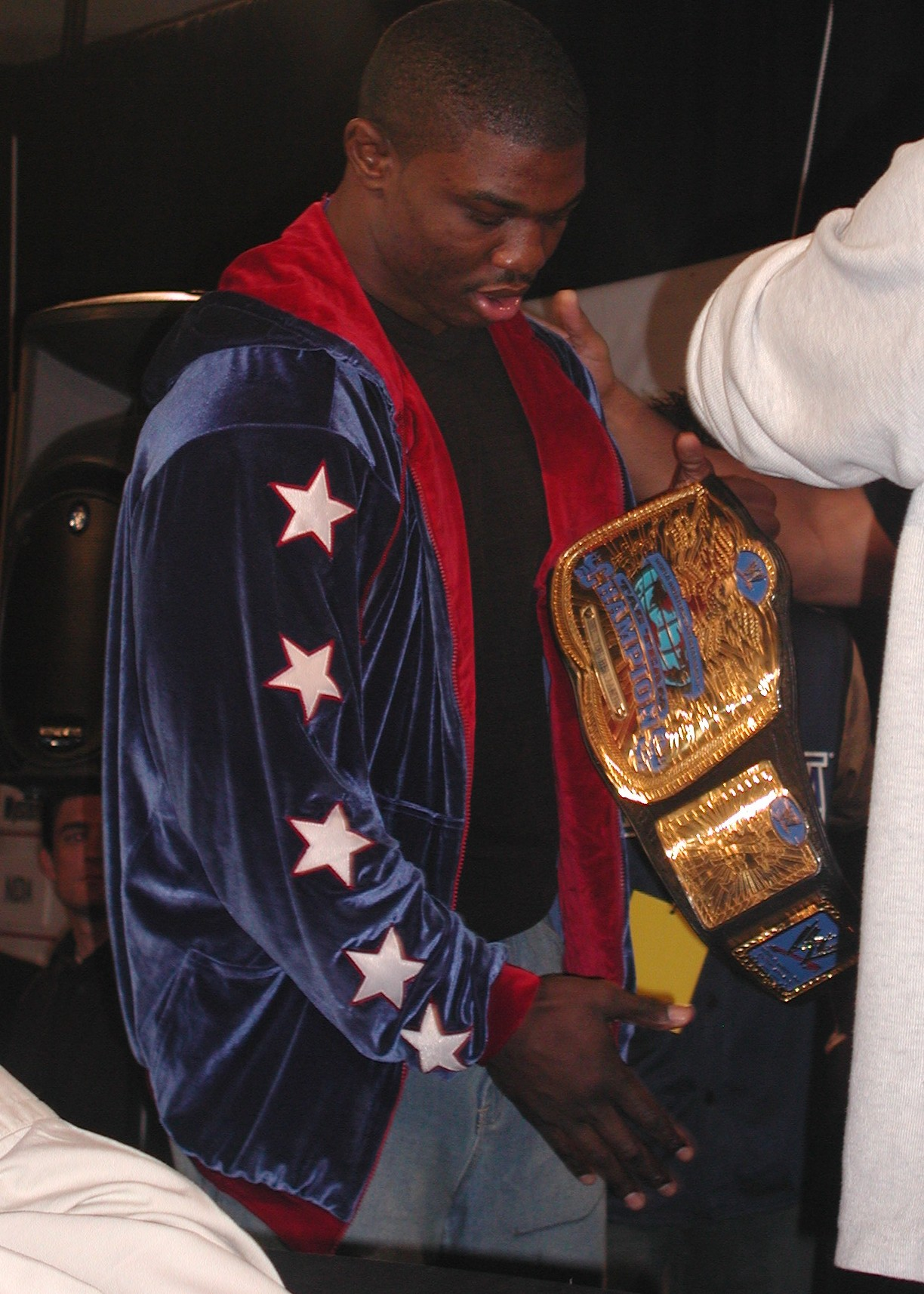
Benjamin as WWE Tag Team Champion in 2003

The following week, on February 6, they won the WWE Tag Team Championship by defeating Los Guerreros. They continued their rivalry with Benoit, facing him and Brock Lesnar at No Way Out in a handicap match, where they teamed with their mentor Angle in a losing effort. After a successful title defense at WrestleMania XIX against Los Guerreros and the team of Chris Benoit and Rhyno, Team Angle lost the championship to Eddie Guerrero and his new partner Tajiri at Judgment Day on May 18 in a ladder match. Shortly afterwards, on June 12, Angle confronted Benjamin and Haas about the losing streak they had been in for a couple of weeks, and, after they blamed him for losing the Tag Team Championship and began to question his leadership, he fired them both from Team Angle. For a few weeks they wrestled against Angle, both in singles matches and in tag team matches.

Soon after the breakup, Benjamin and Haas referred to themselves as The Best Damn Tag Team Period and then The Self-Proclaimed World's Greatest Tag Team, or The World's Greatest Tag Team for short. They went on to recapture the WWE Tag Team Championship from Eddie Guerrero and Tajiri on July 3. Following their win, they competed against the teams of Rey Mysterio and Billy Kidman and the APA, before losing the championship to the reformed Los Guerreros team two months later on September 18. After their loss The World's Greatest Tag Team continued competing against Los Guerreros in an attempt to regain the championship, but were unsuccessful.

In early 2004, The World's Greatest Tag Team began a rivalry with The APA, and beat them at the No Way Out pay-per-view. Following their loss, The World's Greatest Tag Team mocked The APA, leading to The APA attacking them. Both the team of Scotty 2 Hotty and Rikishi and the Basham Brothers also got involved in the brawl, leading to a fatal four-way match at WrestleMania XX for the WWE Tag Team Championship. At WrestleMania, Scotty 2 Hotty and Rikishi retained the championship.

==== Split (2004–2006) ====
The group stayed together until March 22, 2004 when, during the Draft Lottery, Benjamin was drafted to the Raw brand, breaking up The World's Greatest Tag Team. On the Raw brand Benjamin was quickly added to the WWE Intercontinental Championship picture, first challenging for it at Bad Blood in June 2004 against Randy Orton. He eventually won the championship at Taboo Tuesday in October by defeating Chris Jericho, and held the championship for approximately eight months, eventually losing it to Carlito in June 2005. He held the championship twice more during 2006.

After Benjamin's draft, Haas gained Miss Jackie as a valet and teamed with Rico to win the WWE Tag Team Championship on April 22, 2004. After a brief spell in singles competition, Haas joined forces with Hardcore Holly briefly, before being released from WWE in July 2005. Haas wrestled in the independent circuit for nearly a year, wrestling in Jersey All Pro Wrestling and other independent promotions and as well as New Wrestling Entertainment in Italy before returning to WWE on the Raw brand in April 2006.

==== Reformation on Raw (2006–2008) ====
On April 17, 2006, Haas returned to WWE as part of the Raw brand, defeating his former tag team partner, Benjamin, the very same night. On the December 4 episode of Raw, after Benjamin pinned Super Crazy, Haas entered the ring, berated Crazy, and celebrated with a bewildered Benjamin. The next week, Benjamin announced The World's Greatest Tag Team was officially back in a segment with Cryme Tyme. They defeated The Highlanders in a match later that same night. They then started a scripted rivalry with Cryme Tyme, but were largely unsuccessful, including a tag team turmoil match at New Year's Revolution. They finally pinned Cryme Tyme, however, ending their undefeated streak, on the January 29, 2007 episode of Raw.

On April 2, The World's Greatest Tag Team was unsuccessful in defeating the team of Ric Flair and Carlito, but defeated them in a rematch on April 16 when Haas distracted Carlito, allowing Benjamin to gain the win. They won again two weeks later when Carlito turned on Flair, attacking him and allowing The World's Greatest Tag Team to win via countout. They then challenged the Hardy Boyz for the World Tag Team Championship at One Night Stand in a ladder match, but were unsuccessful.

Following this, The World's Greatest Tag Team began a rivalry with Paul London and Brian Kendrick after losing to the duo in their debut match on Raw. A few weeks later, London defeated Benjamin in a singles match, however, on the July 23 episode of Raw, The World's Greatest Tag Team got a tag team win over London and Kendrick to end the rivalry. For this match they were announced as The (Self-Proclaimed) World's Greatest Tag Team, having been previously using simply The World's Greatest Tag Team since their reformation.

Following this, Benjamin and Haas competed against the teams of Hardcore Holly and Cody Rhodes and Super Crazy and Jim Duggan until November, when the team was disbanded due to Benjamin joining the ECW roster. Benjamin was drafted to the SmackDown brand as part of the 2008 Supplemental Draft.

==== Sporadic reformations and aftermath (2009) ====
On April 15, 2009, Haas was drafted to the SmackDown brand as part of the 2009 Supplemental Draft. On the May 8, 2009 episode of SmackDown, Benjamin accompanied Haas to the ring for his match against John Morrison, hinting at a possible reunion. The following week on the May 15 episode of SmackDown, Benjamin and Haas unofficially reunited and competed against John Morrison and CM Punk in a losing effort. At Judgment Day, Haas escorted Benjamin to the ring for his match against Morrison. On June 29, Benjamin was traded back to the ECW brand. On February 28, 2010, WWE announced that Haas had been released from his contract, and two months later, on April 22, WWE announced that Benjamin had also been released, but returned, sans Haas, in 2017.

=== Ring of Honor (2010–2013) ===
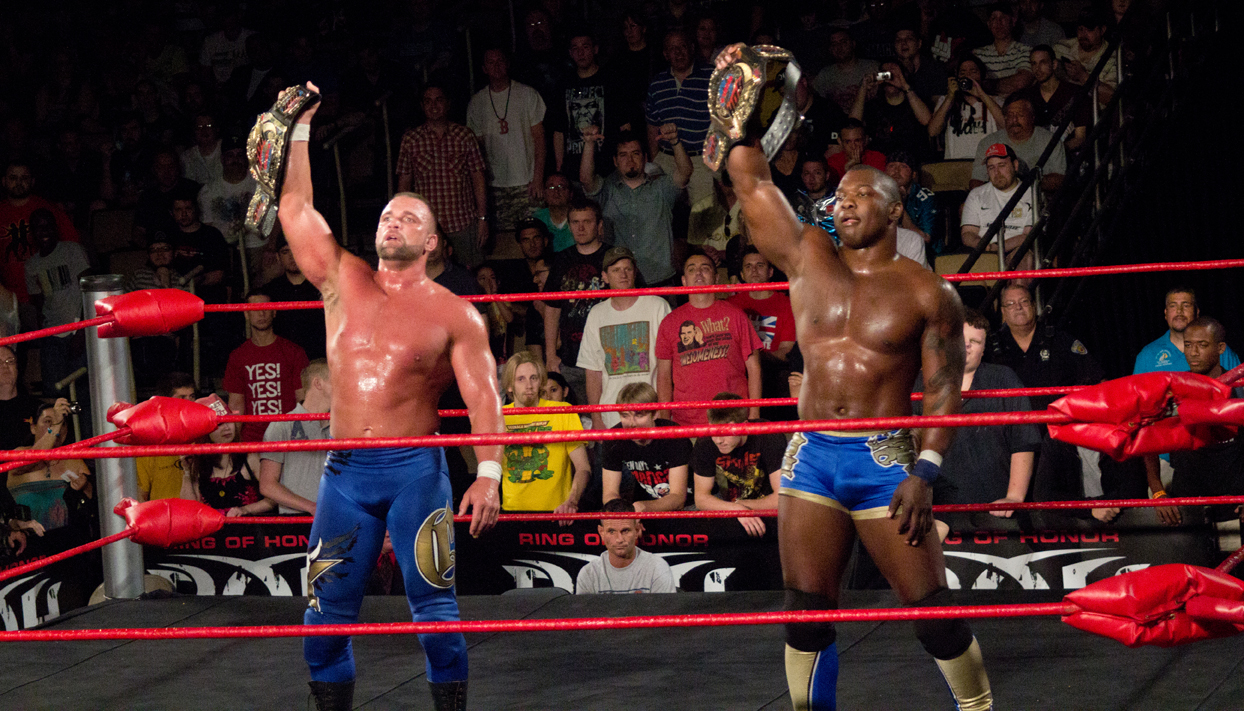
Charlie Haas (left) and Shelton Benjamin (right) as the ROH World Tag Team Champions in March 2012

On August 2, 2010, Ring of Honor announced that Haas and Benjamin would reform as a tag team, at Glory By Honor IX on September 11, 2010, to wrestle the ROH World Tag Team Champions Kings of Wrestling (Chris Hero and Claudio Castagnoli). The duo later stated that they would collectively be known as Wrestling's Greatest Tag Team. At Glory By Honor IX Haas and Benjamin were defeated by Hero and Castagnoli in a non–title match. On December 8, 2010, Haas and Benjamin returned to Ohio Valley Wrestling, more than seven years after their previous match for the promotion. In their return match they defeated The Elite (Adam Revolver and Ted McNaler). The following day they took part in their first Ring of Honor Wrestling tapings, defeating the Bravado Brothers (Harlem and Lance). The following day, at the second set of television tapings, Haas and Benjamin defeated the All Night Express of Kenny King and Rhett Titus, before participating in an eight-man tag team match, in which Haas and Benjmain teamed with the Briscoe Brothers against the Kings of Wrestling and the All-Night Xpress. The match ended in a no contest. On December 18 at the Final Battle 2010 pay-per-view, Haas and Benjamin announced that in 2011 they would be wrestling regularly for Ring of Honor. At the following pay-per-view, 9th Anniversary Show, on February 26, 2011, Haas and Benjamin defeated the Briscoe Brothers in the main event of the evening to earn another shot at the Kings of Wrestling and the ROH World Tag Team Championship.

On April 1, at Honor Takes Center Stage Night One, Haas and Benjamin defeated the Kings of Wrestling to win the ROH World Tag Team Championship. On June 26 at Best in the World 2011, Haas and Benjamin successfully defended the ROH World Tag Team Championship in a four-way match against the Briscoe Brothers, the Kings of Wrestling and the All Night Express. On December 23, Haas and Benjamin lost the ROH World Tag Team Championship to the Briscoe Brothers at the Final Battle 2011 pay-per-view, turning heel during the match. On May 12, 2012 at Border Wars, Hass and Benjamin regained the ROH World Tag Team Championship from the Briscoe Brothers. On June 24 at Best in the World 2012, Haas and Benjamin lost the title to Kenny King and Rhett Titus.

Shortly after their loss, Benjamin was suspended in storyline, to explain his absence while wrestling in Japan. Benjamin returned at the Death Before Dishonor X pay-per-view, accompanying Haas and Rhett Titus in a tag team championship match. Following Death Before Dishonor, Haas and Benjamin would continue to feud with Titus and his new tag team partner B. J. Whitmer defeating them at Glory By Honor XI. They defeated them again in a street fight at Final Battle. Benjamin was released from ROH in December 2012. He made one more appearance for ROH on February 2, 2013, when Haas turned on him during an ROH World Tag Team Championship match against the Briscoe Brothers.

=== Independent circuit (2014-2015) ===
On November 15, 2014, Jersey All Pro Wrestling's 18th Anniversary Show, Benjamin, Haas, and Angle (collectively known as Team Angle) reunited again. Haas and Benjamin defeated Chris Sabin and Teddy Hart in the main event of the show. On November 21, 2015 they won the Danny Davis Invitational Tag Team Tournament for Ohio Valley Wrestling defeating The Wild Boyz (Bud Dwight and Eddie Diamond).

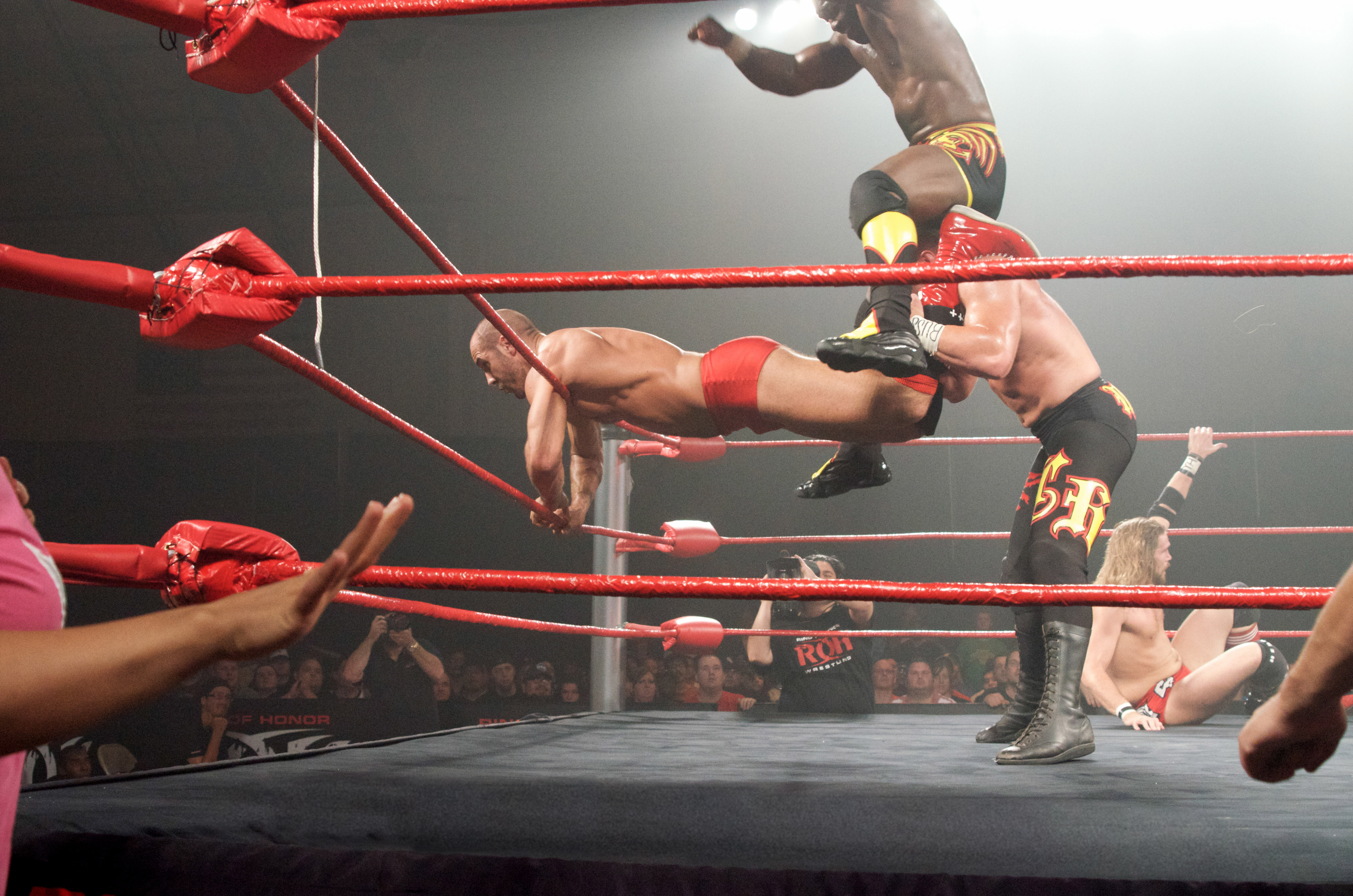
Haas and Benjamin performing the Broken Arrow on Claudio Castagnoli

== Championships and accomplishments ==
- Ohio Valley Wrestling
  - Danny Davis Invitational Tag Team Tournament (2015) – Haas and Benjamin
- Pro Wrestling Illustrated
  - PWI Tag Team of the Year (2003)
- Ring of Honor
  - ROH World Tag Team Championship (2 times) – Haas and Benjamin
- World Wrestling Entertainment
  - WWE Championship (1 time) – Angle
  - WWE Tag Team Championship (2 times) – Haas and Benjamin
