= ROH World Tag Team Championship =

Men's professional wrestling championship

- The original belt design used from years 2005–2009 and 2022–2023.

Details
- Promotion: Ring of Honor
- Date established: September 21, 2002
- Current champions: El Sky Team (Místico and Máscara Dorada)
- Date won: June 26, 2026

Other names
- ROH Tag Team Championship (2002–2006); ROH World Tag Team Championship (2006–present)
Statistics
- First champions: The Prophecy (Christopher Daniels and Donovan Morgan)
- Most reigns: The Briscoe Brothers (Jay Briscoe and Mark Briscoe) (13 reigns)
- Longest reign: The Sons of Texas (Dustin Rhodes and Sammy Guevara) (377 days)
- Shortest reign: The Prophecy (Dan Maff and B. J. Whitmer) and The Briscoe Brothers (Jay Briscoe and Mark Briscoe) (<1 day)
- Oldest champion: Dustin Rhodes (55 years, 122 days)
- Youngest champion: Mark Briscoe (18 years, 287 days)
- Heaviest champion: War Machine (Hanson and Ray Rowe) (550 lb (250 kg))
- Lightest champion: Special K (Izzy and Dixie) (340 lb (150 kg))

The ROH World Tag Team Championship is a men's professional wrestling world tag team championship created and promoted by the American promotion Ring of Honor (ROH). Establish on September 21, 2002, it is the company's traditional tag team title, contested between teams of two wrestlers, and the inaugural champions were The Prophecy (Christopher Daniels and Donovan Morgan). In addition to being in ROH, the championship is also occasionally defended on All Elite Wrestling's (AEW) programs, as AEW and ROH are both owned by Tony Khan. The current champions are El Sky Team (Místico and Máscara Dorada), who are in their first reign as a team and individually. They won the title by defeating La Facción Ingobernable (Sammy Guevara and The Beast Mortos) at CMLL Super Viernes on June 26, 2026.

== History ==
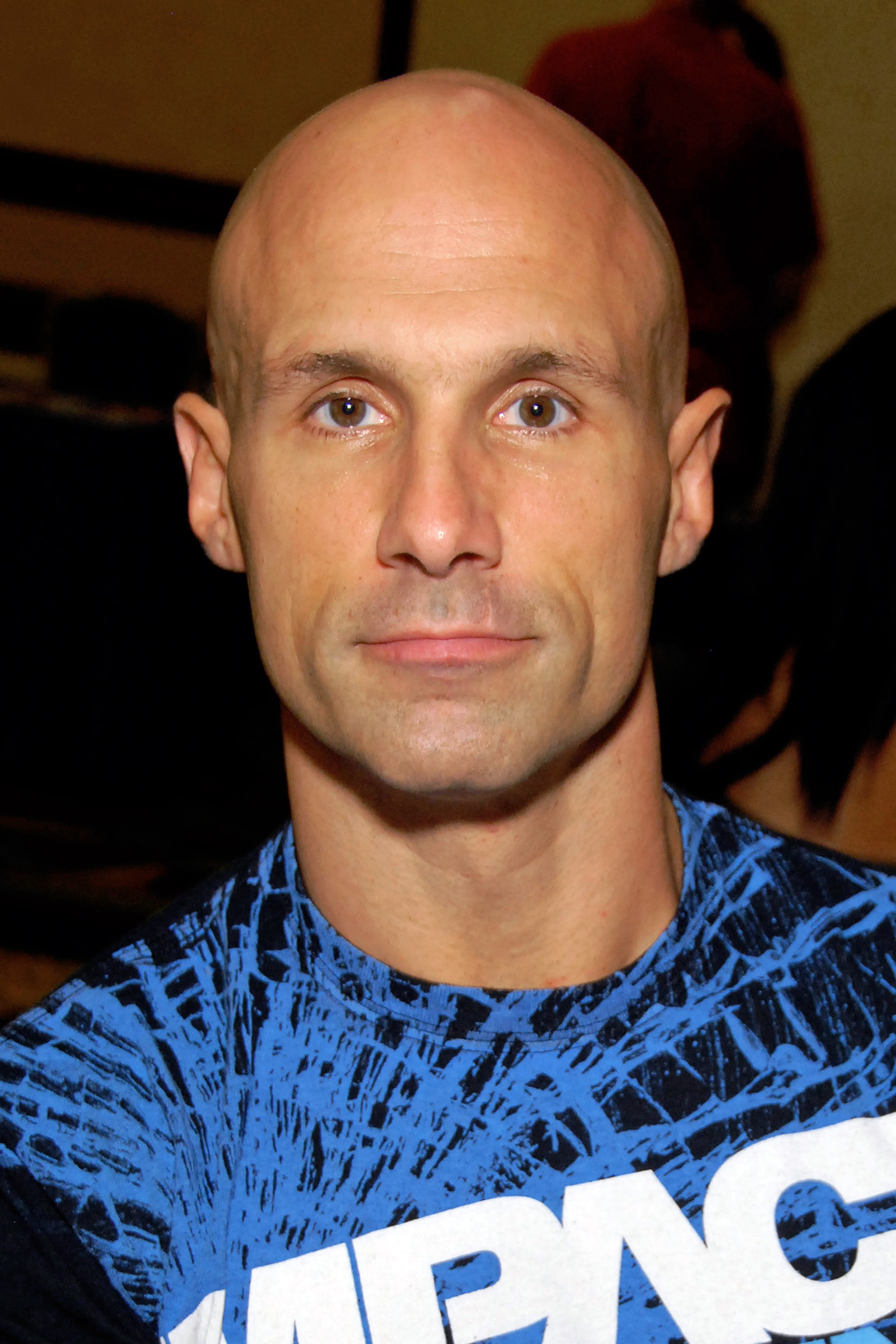
One-half of the inaugural ROH Tag Team champions Christopher Daniels.

The ROH Tag Team Championship was introduced at Unscripted on September 21, 2002, where ROH held a tournament to crown the first champions. At the time, ROH did not have title belts, and instead presented Christopher Daniels and Donovan Morgan (The Prophecy), the winners of the tournament, with a trophy.

The title became the ROH World Tag Team Championship after then champions Austin Aries and Roderick Strong defeated Naruki Doi and Masato Yoshino on July 9, 2006, while on a tour in Japan with Dragon Gate and Pro Wrestling Noah. Since then, the title has also been defended in the United Kingdom.

On December 10, 2022 at Final Battle The Briscoe Brothers became record setting 13-time champions. During their reign, one-half of The Briscoe Brothers Jay Briscoe died in a car accident on January 17, 2023. His brother Mark Briscoe kept the title until it was vacated at Supercard of Honor on March 21, 2023.

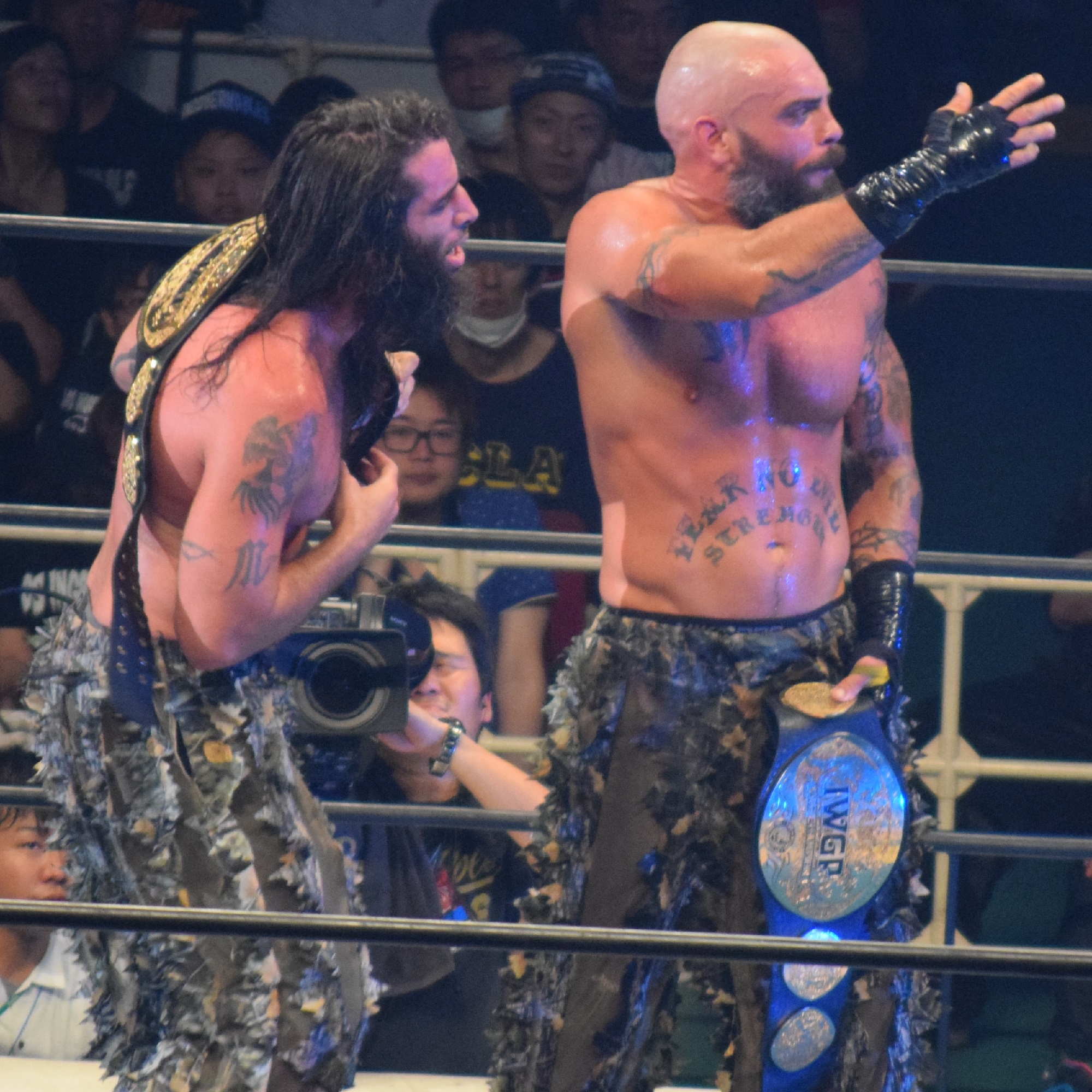
Record-setting 13 time champions The Briscoe Brothers (The late Jay Briscoe (right) and Mark Briscoe (left)).

== Inaugural championship tournament (2002) ==
=== Tournament bracket ===
Quarterfinals; ROH Wrestling tapings
The Prophecy (Christopher Daniels and Donovan Morgan)	7:21
The S.A.T. (Joel Maximo and Jose Maximo)	Pin
The Full Blooded Italians aka The F.B.I. (James Maritato and Tony Mamaluke)	Pin
Dick Togo and Ikuto Hidaka	9:42
Divine Storm (Chris Divine and Quiet Storm)	Pin
American Dragon and Michael Modest	6:23
Da Hit Squad (Mafia and Monsta Mack) ^{1}	DNP
The Natural Born Sinners (Boogalou and Homicide) ^{1}	DNP

Semifinals; ROH Wrestling tapings
The Prophecy (Christopher Daniels and Donovan Morgan)	14:24
Dick Togo and Ikuto Hidaka	Pin
American Dragon and Michael Modest	Bye

Final; ROH Wrestling tapings
The Prophecy (Christopher Daniels and Donovan Morgan)	14:42
American Dragon and Michael Modest	Pin

1 Neither team was able to compete after being attacked by The Carnage Crew before the start of their scheduled match.

== Belt designs ==
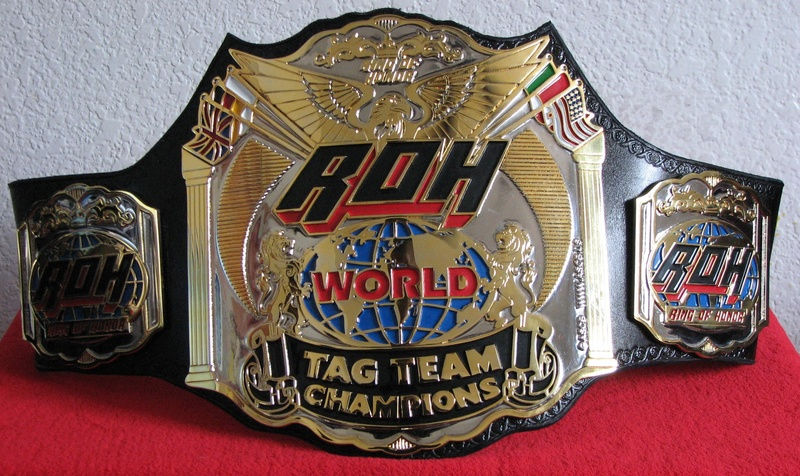
ROH World Tag Team Championship belts (left to right): third design (2005–2009, 2022–2023) and fourth design (2010–2012).

Since originating in 2002, the title belts were introduced in 2003 and redesigned in 2005, 2010, 2012, 2018, and 2023. On March 31, 2023, the sixth belt design debuted at Supercard of Honor.

The sixth design of the ROH World Tag Team Championship from years 2018 to 2022 is sort of like a circle like repetitive round crown on all five plates of the belt that is gold with red and silver diamonds all around the center and side plates (two side plates per side equaling to four side plates total) with also gold wording in the middle with black outlining on them and on the side of the belts plates that say ROH Tag Team but in the main middle center plate separating it from the sides has the extra words World and champions in the middle.

== Reigns ==
Current champions El Sky Team (Místico and Máscara Dorada).

Overall, there have been 72 reigns among 77 different wrestlers and 44 different teams. The inaugural champions were The Prophecy (Christopher Daniels and Donovan Morgan), who defeated American Dragon and Michael Modest on September 21, 2002, to become the champions. The team of Jay Lethal and Jonathan Gresham have the longest reign as champions with their first reign lasting 441 days. The Briscoes (Jay Briscoe and Mark Briscoe) hold the record for the most reigns with 13 (both as a team and individually).

The current champions are El Sky Team (Místico and Máscara Dorada), who are in their first reign as a team and individually. They won the title by defeating La Facción Ingobernable (Sammy Guevara and The Beast Mortos) at CMLL Super Viernes on June 26, 2026.
