= Final Battle (2022) =

2022 Ring of Honor pay-per-view

- Promotional poster featuring Samoa Joe
- Promotion: Ring of Honor
- Date: December 10, 2022
- City: Arlington, Texas
- Venue: College Park Center
- Attendance: 2,700

Event chronology
← Previous; Death Before Dishonor	Next → Supercard of Honor

Final Battle chronology
← Previous; 2021	Next → 2023

The 2022 Final Battle was a professional wrestling pay-per-view event produced by American promotion Ring of Honor (ROH). It was the 21st Final Battle event and took place on December 10, 2022 at the College Park Center in Arlington, Texas. It was ROH's second live event under the full ownership of All Elite Wrestling (AEW) president Tony Khan.

Twelve matches were contested at the event, including four on the pre-show. Claudio Castagnoli defeated Chris Jericho by submission to win the ROH World Championship in the main event. In other prominent matches, The Briscoes (Jay Briscoe and Mark Briscoe) defeated FTR (Cash Wheeler and Dax Harwood) by referee stoppage in a Double Dog Collar match to win the ROH World Tag Team Championship in what was Jay's final match in ROH, Wheeler Yuta defeated Daniel Garcia in a Pure Wrestling Rules match to win the ROH Pure Championship, and Athena defeated Mercedes Martinez to win the ROH Women's World Championship.

The event received positive reviews with the Double Dog Collar Match earning critical acclaim. Dave Meltzer of the Wrestling Observer Newsletter gave the Double Dog Collar Match a 5.5-star rating. The match also finished first in the Voices of Wrestling Match of the Year poll for 2022.

== Production ==
=== Background ===
Final Battle is a professional wrestling event produced by Ring of Honor. First held in 2002, it is traditionally ROH's last show in the calendar year. It is widely regarded as Ring of Honor's premiere flagship event, similar to WWE's WrestleMania.

On October 18, 2022, ROH announced that Final Battle would be held at the College Park Center in Arlington, Texas on December 10. The event will be held on the same day as WWE's NXT Deadline and UFC 282.

=== Storylines ===
The event featured several professional wrestling matches, which involved different wrestlers from pre-existing scripted feuds, plots, and storylines. Wrestlers portray villains or heroes as they follow a series of events that build tension and culminate in a wrestling match or series of matches. ROH's weekly series, Ring of Honor Wrestling, was on hiatus prior to its acquisition by All Elite Wrestling (AEW) president Tony Khan. As a result, storylines were instead produced on AEW's weekly television programs, Dynamite and Rampage; their supplementary online streaming shows, Dark and Elevation; as well as promotional videos on AEW's YouTube channel.

At AEW Grand Slam, Chris Jericho defeated Claudio Castagnoli to win the ROH World Championship after delivering a low blow to Castagnoli. This would be Jericho's eight overall world championship in professional wrestling, hence his new moniker, "The Ocho," briefly leaving his "The Wizard" moniker. Since precuring the title, Jericho vowed to destroy everything related to Ring of Honor before rebuilding it in his image, dubbing it "Ring of Jericho." Additionally, Jericho would successfully defend the title against former Ring of Honor champions - including Bandido, Bryan Danielson, Dalton Castle, and Colt Cabana - though usually by utilizing some form of cheating. At Full Gear, Jericho would retain the title against Castagnoli, Danielson, and Sammy Guevara, pinning Castagnoli after a Judas Effect. On the November 25 episode of AEW Rampage, Castagnoli confronted the Jericho Appreciation Society, who were cutting a promo in the ring, and challenged Jericho to a rematch. Jericho initially refused, but after some convincing by JAS member Matt Menard, Jericho changed his mind and accepted the challenge for Final Battle on the condition that if Castagnoli loses the match, he would be forced to join the JAS.

At Death Before Dishonor, Wheeler Yuta of the Blackpool Combat Club successfully defended the ROH Pure Championship against Daniel Garcia of the Jericho Appreciation Society. Several weeks later on AEW Dynamite - held in Garcia's hometown of Buffalo, New York - Garcia defeated Yuta in a rematch to win the title. On the November 30 episode of Dynamite, during a sit-down interview with members of the BCC and JAS, Yuta challenged Garcia to a third match at Final Battle, which Garcia accepted.

On the November 18 edition of Rampage, Athena, who recently began having a new vicious streak, defeated Madison Rayne. Afterwards, as had now been commonplace for Athena, she continued attacking Rayne after the bout, even knocking down referee Aubrey Edwards when she tried to intervene. Athena would later be confronted by ROH Women's World Champion Mercedes Martinez, making her first televised appearance since Death Before Dishonor after suffering an injury. As a result of her attacking Edwards, Athena was suspended for a week. The following Friday on Rampage, Athena called out Martinez to put her championship on the line against her. On December 1, ROH announced that Martinez and Athena will wrestle for the title at Final Battle.

On the December 2 edition of Rampage, Keith Lee was set for a backstage interview before being confronted by former tag team partner Shane Taylor. Taylor would comment about how "the business between you [Lee] and I [Taylor] is far from over," while asking about what it was with Lee leaving "family." He would reference how he left former partner JD Griffey in the Texas independent scene, how he left Taylor in ROH when he signed with Evolve, and recently abandoning Swerve Strickland during the AEW World Tag Team Championship match at Full Gear. Taylor would later throw out a challenge to Lee for Final Battle, with he and Griffey facing Swerve In Our Glory. Strickland would then appear behind Lee as Taylor left, with a hesitant Lee asking if he can still trust Strickland.

At Supercard of Honor XV, FTR (Cash Wheeler and Dax Harwood) defeated The Briscoes (Jay Briscoe and Mark Briscoe) to capture the ROH World Tag Team Championship. Three months later at Death Before Dishonor, a rematch between the two teams took place, this time a two-out-of-three falls match. There, FTR defeated The Briscoes 2-1 to retain the titles. On the December 7 episode of Dynamite, FTR failed to win the AEW World Tag Team Championship when they were confronted by The Gunns (Austin Gunn and Colten Gunn), who appeared on the titantron. The Gunns would reveal a Christmas card signed in blood by The Briscoes, challenging them to one more match at Final Battle. As an added twist, The Gunns would later pull dog collars out of stockings, making the match a Double Dog Collar Match.

== Event ==
Other on-screen personnel
Role:	Name:
Commentators	Ian Riccaboni
Commentators	Caprice Coleman
Ring announcer	Bobby Cruise
Backstage interviewer	Lexy Nair

=== Pre-show ===
There were four matches on the pre-show. In the opener, Máscara Dorada faced Jeff Cobb. In the end, as Dorada was looking for a springboard move, Cobb countered it into the Tour of the Islands for the win.

Next, Parker and Menard took on the Shinobi Shadow Squad. The former won after performing a double spike DDT on Eli Isom for the win. Next, Willow Nightingale faced Trish Adora. In the end, Nightingale struck with a Pounce and the Doctor Bomb for the victory.

In the pre-show main event, The Kingdom (with Maria Kanellis-Bennett) faced Top Flight. In the closing stages, Darius Martin delivered a suicide dives to Mike Bennett and Matt Taven delivered a trust fall to Dante Martin. Dante and Darius then hit the Nosedive/Powerbomb combination on Bennett for the win.

=== Preliminary matches ===
The opening contest on the main card was a tag team match between Blake Christian and AR Fox; and La Facción Ingobernable (with José the Assistant). In the closing stages, Dralístico delivered a springboard star press, which took out everyone. Christian then delivered a flipping DDT, and a 450° splash from Fox unto Dralístico, which gave them the victory. After the match, Rush and Dralístico attacked Christian and Fox.

Next, Mercedes Martinez defended the ROH Women's World Championship against Athena. In the closing stages, Athena delivered a codebreaker, but Martinez touched the ropes. Athena then removed the turnbuckle pad and dropkicked Martinez into the exposed turnbuckle, then hit The Eclipse for the ROH Women's title.

In the next match, Swerve In Our Glory took on Shane Taylor Promotions. In the end, due to miscommunication, Swerve Strickland left his partner Keith Lee, allowing Shane Taylor and JD Griffey to beat up Lee. As Griffey wanted to hit Lee, he unintentionally took out Taylor, allowing Lee to deliver the Spirit Bomb for the win. Next, The Embassy (with Prince Nana) faced Dalton Castle and The Boys for the ROH World Six-Man Tag Team Championship. The former won after Brian Cage delivered a pop-up powerbomb, to become the new champions.

The next match was a Pure Wrestling Rules match for the ROH Pure Championship, contested between defending champion Daniel Garcia and Wheeler Yuta. In the end, as Garcia was looking for a piledriver, Yuta escaped and locked in the arms of Garcia, giving way to a series of elbows to knock out Garcia, making Yuta the new champion.

Next, FTR faced The Briscoes for the ROH World Tag Team Championship in a Double Dog Collar match. All teams started brawling at ringside. Mark Briscoe hit the Froggy Bow on Cash Wheeler for a two-count. As Wheeler was looking for a suplex onto a stack of chairs, Mark reversed it and suplexed Wheeler into the chairs. Dax Harwood then wrapped a chain around his hand and started punching Jay Briscoe. As Harwood was punching Jay, Jay pulled referee Mike Posey in front of him, which caused severe blood loss to Posey. As Jay was looking for the Jay Driller onto the chair, Wheeler delivered a low blow and delivered a piledriver to Jay onto the chairs. As Harwood as looking for a top rope piledriver, Jay blocked it and delivered a low blow to Harwood with the chain and hit a superplex onto the chairs. Jay then trapped Harwood in a chain-assisted crossface. As Wheeler wanted to enter the ring, Mark blocked him with the chain around Wheeler. With nowhere to go, Harwood tapped out, giving The Briscoes their record-setting 13th ROH World Tag Team Championship. After the match, both teams shook hands, as a sign of respect.

In the penultimate match, Samoa Joe defended the ROH World Television Championship against Juice Robinson. Joe won after countering Robinson's top rope attempt and hitting the Muscle Buster

=== Main event ===
The main event was for the ROH World Championship contested between Claudio Castagnoli and defending champion Chris Jericho, with the stipulation being that if Castagnoli loses, he must join the Jericho Appreciation Society. Jericho refused the Code of Honor to start the match. Jericho went for the Judas Effect, but Castagnoli countered it into the Neutralizer for a near fall. As Castagnoli was looking for the Ricola Bomb from the top rope, Jericho countered it into a hurricarana. Castagnoli hit an uppercut, but Jericho responded with a corner lariat. Jericho hit an uppercut, but Castagnoli started hitting multiple uppercuts. As he was going for a springboard uppercut, Jericho looked for a codebreaker, but Castagnoli countered it into a Big Swing attempt, but Jericho escaped. Jericho performed the Walls of Jericho, but Castagnoli reached the ropes. As Jericho was complaining to the referee, Castagnoli hit an uppercut. This brought out Matt Menard and Angelo Parker. As Parker was distracting the referee, Menard gave Jericho a bat and hit Castagnoli, but Castagnoli again kicked out. Jericho then hit the Codebreaker, and was setting up for the Judas Effect, but Castagnoli countered into the Giant Swing, swinging Jericho 30 times, forcing Jericho to submit, and crowning Castagnoli the new champion.

== Results ==
No.	Results	Stipulations	Times
1^{P}	Jeff Cobb defeated Máscara Dorada by pinfall	Singles match	7:00
2^{P}	The Jericho Appreciation Society (Angelo Parker and Matt Menard) defeated Shinobi Shadow Squad (Cheeseburger and Eli Isom) by pinfall	Tag team match	5:55
3^{P}	Willow Nightingale defeated Trish Adora by pinfall	Singles match	6:00
4^{P}	Top Flight (Dante Martin and Darius Martin) defeated The Kingdom (Matt Taven and Mike Bennett) (with Maria Kanellis-Bennett) by pinfall	Tag team match	11:20
5	Blake Christian and AR Fox defeated La Facción Ingobernable (Rush and Dralístico) (with José the Assistant and Preston Vance) by pinfall	Tag team match	10:35
6	Athena defeated Mercedes Martinez (c) by pinfall	Singles match for the ROH Women's World Championship	13:10
7	Swerve In Our Glory (Swerve Strickland and Keith Lee) defeated Shane Taylor Promotions (Shane Taylor and JD Griffey) by pinfall	Tag team match	13:50
8	The Embassy (Brian Cage and Gates of Agony (Kaun and Toa Liona)) (with Prince Nana) defeated Dalton Castle and The Boys (Brandon Tate and Brent Tate) (c) by pinfall	Six-man tag team match for the ROH World Six-Man Tag Team Championship	10:05
9	Wheeler Yuta defeated Daniel Garcia (c) by referee stoppage	Pure wrestling rules match for the ROH Pure Championship	14:50
10	The Briscoes (Jay Briscoe and Mark Briscoe) defeated FTR (Cash Wheeler and Dax Harwood) (c) by referee stoppage	Double Dog Collar match for the ROH World Tag Team Championship	22:20
11	Samoa Joe (c) defeated Juice Robinson by pinfall	Singles match for the ROH World Television Championship	13:40
12	Claudio Castagnoli defeated Chris Jericho (c) by submission	Singles match for the ROH World Championship; Had Castagnoli lost, he would have had to join the Jericho Appreciation Society.	17:15
(c) / – the champion(s) heading into the match; P / – the match was broadcast on the pre-show

== See also ==
- 2022 in professional wrestling
- List of Ring of Honor pay-per-view events
