= Double or Nothing (2024) =

All Elite Wrestling pay-per-view event

- Promotional poster featuring various AEW wrestlers
- Promotion: All Elite Wrestling
- Date: May 26, 2024
- City: Paradise, Nevada
- Venue: MGM Grand Garden Arena
- Attendance: 9,099
- Buy rate: 133,000

Pay-per-view chronology
← Previous; Dynasty	Next → Forbidden Door

Double or Nothing chronology
← Previous; 2023	Next → 2025

The 2024 Double or Nothing was a professional wrestling pay-per-view (PPV) event produced by All Elite Wrestling (AEW). It was the sixth annual Double or Nothing event and took place during Memorial Day weekend on May 26, 2024, at the MGM Grand Garden Arena in the Las Vegas suburb of Paradise, Nevada. AEW celebrated its five-year anniversary by returning to the MGM Grand Garden Arena, five years after the inaugural 2019 event was held.

Twelve matches were contested at the event, including two on the "Buy In" pre-show. In the event's final match, which was promoted as part of a triple main event, The Elite (Matthew Jackson, Nicholas Jackson, Kazuchika Okada, and Jack Perry) defeated Team AEW (Bryan Danielson, Darby Allin, Cash Wheeler, and Dax Harwood) in an Anarchy in the Arena match. The second main event, which was the penultimate match, saw Swerve Strickland defeat Christian Cage to retain the AEW World Championship, and in the first main event, Mercedes Moné defeated Willow Nightingale to win the AEW TBS Championship in her AEW in-ring debut. In another prominent match, Adam Copeland defeated Malakai Black by referee stoppage in a Barbed Wire Steel Cage match to retain the AEW TNT Championship. The event also featured the returns of MJF and Juice Robinson, as well as an appearance by Gangrel.

== Production ==
=== Background ===
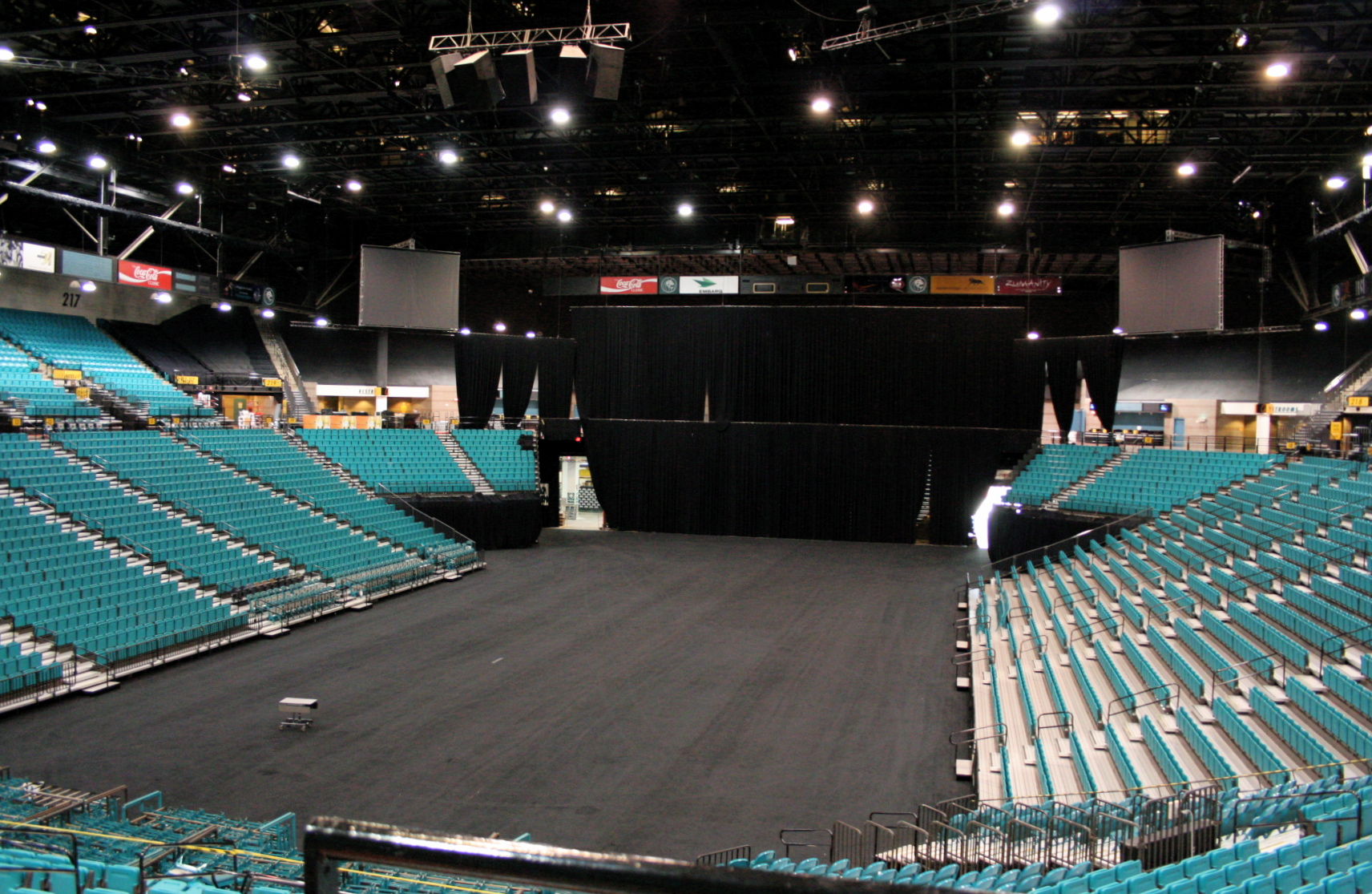
Double or Nothing returns to the MGM Grand Garden Arena in 2024, which is the same venue which hosted the inaugural event in 2019.

Double or Nothing is considered All Elite Wrestling's (AEW) marquee event, having first been held in 2019, which was the promotion's first professional wrestling event and first pay-per-view (PPV) produced. It is held annually in May during Memorial Day weekend and is one of AEW's "Big Four" PPVs, which includes All Out, Full Gear, and Revolution, their four biggest domestic shows produced quarterly. The event's name is a reference to its Las Vegas theme and it is traditionally held in the Las Vegas area in Paradise, Nevada. Exceptions from this norm occurred in 2020 and 2021 due to COVID-19 pandemic restrictions that were in place at the time, but they maintained the Vegas theme.

On March 27, 2024, it was announced that the sixth Double or Nothing event would take place on May 26 at the MGM Grand Garden Arena, marking a return to the venue after five years, which was when the inaugural 2019 event was held there. It was also announced that during Double or Nothing weekend, Saturday Night Collision the night before on May 25 would also be held at the venue.

=== Storylines ===
Double or Nothing featured professional wrestling matches that involve different wrestlers from pre-existing feuds and storylines. Storylines were produced on AEW's weekly television programs, Dynamite, Rampage, and Collision, and the YouTube series Being The Dark Order.

Starting in early 2024, The Young Bucks (Matthew Jackson and Nicholas Jackson) turned heel for the first time since 2022 by embracing their roles as AEW's executive vice presidents. They started abusing their power by (kayfabe) suspending "Hangman" Adam Page and kicking Kenny Omega (who had been inactive due to legitimately suffering from diverticulitis) out of The Elite, while subsequently bringing in New Japan Pro-Wrestling (NJPW) mainstay Kazuchika Okada into AEW and The Elite, which also established Okada as a heel after he attacked Eddie Kingston and won the AEW Continental Championship on the March 20 episode of Dynamite, which is his first championship since moving to the United States. The Bucks later won the vacant AEW World Tag Team Championship at Dynasty against FTR (Cash Wheeler and Dax Harwood) after receiving assistance from a returning Jack Perry, who had been off AEW television and competing in NJPW following his backstage altercation with CM Punk at All In, which led to Perry's suspension (and Punk's firing in which led to the arrival of Adam Copeland in AEW), and Perry officially joined The Elite after assisting them in attacking AEW president and CEO Tony Khan. Omega made an appearance on the May 1 episode of Dynamite to talk about his health and AEW's status, and would later be attacked by The Elite. The following week, Omega (via a pre recorded video from the hospital) used his own EVP power to book an Anarchy in the Arena match with The Elite going up against a "Team AEW" originally comprising FTR, Kingston, and Bryan Danielson. Kingston would be removed from the match after legitimately breaking his leg at NJPW's Resurgence, with his space in the match taken by Darby Allin, who returned from a broken foot on the May 15 episode of Dynamite to assist Team AEW in fending off The Elite.

In the main event at Dynasty, Swerve Strickland defeated Samoa Joe to win the AEW World Championship. After condemning The Elite for their actions against Tony Khan, Swerve found out they had chosen his Double or Nothing opponent to be a returning Christian Cage, whose Patriarchy stable would assault Swerve. During another confrontation with The Patriarchy on the May 8 episode of Dynamite, Swerve's Mogul Embassy stablemates would turn on him as well.

At NJPW Resurgence in 2023, Willow Nightingale defeated Mercedes Moné to become the inaugural NJPW Strong Women's Champion, a match in which Moné suffered a broken ankle. At Dynamite: Big Business on March 13, 2024, Moné made her anticipated AEW debut, and following the show's main event match, helped Willow Nightingale fend off an attack from AEW TBS Champion Julia Hart. On the April 3 episode of Dynamite, Moné declared that she would be challenging whoever was the champion at Double or Nothing, which would also be her AEW debut match. At Dynasty later that month, Nightingale defeated Hart to win the TBS Championship, thus scheduling Nightingale to defend the title against Moné at Double or Nothing.

At NJPW's Windy City Riot, Jon Moxley defeated Tetsuya Naito to win the IWGP World Heavyweight Championship. He then began feuding with The Don Callis Family when Don Callis arranged a title match against Powerhouse Hobbs on the April 24 episode of Dynamite. Moxley won the match and would be called out by Konosuke Takeshita. Takeshita would attack Moxley on the following week's Dynamite, and an eliminator match for a future title shot would be scheduled for Double or Nothing.

At Revolution, Roderick Strong defeated Orange Cassidy to win the AEW International Championship. On the April 24 episode of Dynamite, Will Ospreay won a Casino Gauntlet Match to become the number one contender to the championship at Double or Nothing.

At Dynasty, TNT Champion Adam Copeland (along with Mark Briscoe and Eddie Kingston) lost a Trios match to House of Black after Malakai Black spit black mist into Copeland's face and hit him with the Black Mass for the win. In the weeks following, Copeland defeated Buddy Matthews and Brody King in singles matches in order to challenge Black at Double or Nothing to a Barbed Wire Steel Cage match with the title on the line. On the May 15 episode of Dynamite, House of Black attacked Copeland and stole his wedding ring which belonged to him and his wife, Beth Copeland. In a backstage promo, Black accepted the match, but on the condition that if he won, Copeland would have to bend a knee to the House of Black.

Chris Jericho began feuding with Hook when the latter refused to take on a mentor-student relationship. This led to a match between the two at Dynasty where Jericho won Hook's FTW Championship, turning heel, and adopting a sarcastic advice and guidance offering moniker "The Learning Tree". He took on Big Bill as a "student" when he assisted in Jericho retaining the title in a match against Katsuyori Shibata on the May 1 episode of Dynamite. Hook returned on the May 15 episode of Dynamite to demand a rematch for the title, but Jericho said he would have to earn his way back to contendership. Shibata also wanted another shot at Jericho, so a trios qualifying match was set up for the May 22 episode of Dynamite with qualifying matches on the May 18 episode of Collision. Hook, Shibata, and Bryan Keith won their respective matches against Johnny TV, Rocky Romero, and Boulder, and during the qualifying match itself, Keith tapped out to both Hook and Shibata's submission holds, causing the FTW Championship match to become a three-way match.

Serena Deeb returned to AEW after a fourteen-month hiatus due to seizures and set her sights on winning the AEW Women's World Championship from "Timeless" Toni Storm. She became the number one contender after Storm threw in the towel during Deeb's match with Mariah May on the May 1 episode of Dynamite.

== Event ==
Other on-screen personnel
Role	Name
Commentators	Excalibur (Pre-show and PPV)
Commentators	Tony Schiavone (Pre-show and PPV)
Commentators	Taz (PPV)
Commentators	Nigel McGuinness (PPV)
Commentators	Matt Menard (Pre-show)
Commentators	Don Callis (Ospreay vs. Strong and Cassidy vs. Beretta)
Ring announcers	Justin Roberts (PPV)
Ring announcers	Bobby Cruise (Pre-show)
Referees	Aubrey Edwards
Referees	Bryce Remsburg
Referees	Mike Posey
Referees	Paul Turner
Referees	Rick Knox
Referees	Stephon Smith
Referees	Brandon Martinez
Interviewer	Lexy Nair
Pre-show hosts	Renee Paquette
Pre-show hosts	RJ City
Pre-show hosts	Jeff Jarrett

=== Pre-show ===
In the first match of the pre-show, Deonna Purrazzo faced Thunder Rosa. In the end, as Rosa attempted to lock in a submission, Purrazzo rolled her over and grabbed the ropes for leverage to secure the pinfall.

In the second and final match of the pre-show, The Acclaimed (Max Caster, Anthony Bowens, and Billy Gunn) faced Cage of Agony (Brian Cage, Toa Liona, and Bishop Kaun). Cage tried to introduce a steel chair to the match but had the weapon snatched by Vegas Golden Knights mascot Chance the Gila. Caster hit Cage with a Fameasser and Gunn rolled up Kaun in the confusion.

=== Preliminary matches ===
The actual pay-per-view opened with Roderick Strong (accompanied by The Undisputed Kingdom – Matt Taven and Mike Bennett) defending the AEW International Championship against Will Ospreay. In the opening stages, Ospreay performed a springboard somersault plancha from the barricade to Strong, Taven and Bennett. Strong delivered a backbreaker to Ospreay for a two-count, but Ospreay recovered and delivered a handspring enzeguiri. As Taven and Bennett were distracting the referee, Wardlow attacked Ospreay from behind, but the referee caught Wardlow and ejected him, Taven and Bennett from ringside. Ospreay used the opportunity to perform a Sky Twister Press to The Undisputed Kingdom (Strong, Taven, Bennett and Wardlow) on the outside. Ospreay then performed Cheeky Nandos and a Perfect Plex on Strong for a two-count. Strong delivered a superplex and an inverted End of Heartache to Ospreay for a two-count. Strong attempted a running jumping knee strike, but Ospreay countered it mid-air with a Liger Bomb. As the referee was checking on Strong, Don Callis left the commentary booth, jumped on the apron and told Ospreay to use the Tiger Driver '91. Ospreay attempted the Stormbreaker, but Strong escaped and delivered a Sick Kick and a gutbuster. Strong attempted the End of Heartache again, but Ospreay flipped out, delivered the Hidden Blade and then a Stormbreaker to win the title.

Adam Cole then came out and cut a promo saying that he shouldn’t be out there, he should be hanging out with the rest of the Undisputed Kingdom, instead of being here. Nobody had any idea how much he has been through, and he’s one of the best of the generation. We do have a little devil inside all of us. Cole was impeded with a video of a man's house, including the Dynamite Diamond Ring, MJF's Burberry scarf and a poker chip. The lights then went out and MJF's music hit, marking MJF's first AEW appearance since Worlds End in December 2023. MJF made his way to the ring, low blowed Cole and delivered a brainbuster to him. MJF then said that he gave Cole his trust and he would never do so again. MJF then picked up the devil mask. MJF then said " No one is on the level of the devil. This stupid, goofy, grotesque, mask, and everything else it symbolizes can go straight to hell". MJF then tosses the mask in the crowd. He said that he has been betting on himself since day one, and in regard to his contract status, MJF showed a tattoo on his calf that says “Bet on Yourself” with an AEW casino chip, and then says he isn't leaving AEW.

Next, The Bang Bang Gang (Jay White, Austin Gunn, and Colten Gunn) defended the Unified World Trios Championship (consisting of the AEW and ROH trios titles) against Death Triangle (Pac, Penta El Zero Miedo, and Rey Fenix) (accompanied by Alex Abrahantes). In the opening stages, The Lucha Brothers (Penta and Fénix) performed a tope con gilo/somersault plancha to The Bang Bang Gang. White delivered a DDT to Pac for a two-count. Fénix delivered a superkick to Austin, Penta delivered a backstabber to Colten, Spinning back kick by Penta, superkick by Fenix, and a twisting Death Valley Driver by Penta to White for a two-count. Pac delivered a rebound German suplex and a running Canadian Destroyer to Austin. The Lucha Brothers then delivered the Fear Factor to White, as Fénix delivered a top rope crossbody to The Gunns on the outside. Pac attempted the Black Arrow, but as White was distracting the referee, Juice Robinson made his return for the first time since October 2023, and shoved Pac from the top rope, allowing White to deliver the Bladerunner to Pac and pin him to retain the trios title.

After that, "Timeless" Toni Storm (accompanied by Luther the Butler and Mariah May) defended the AEW Women's World Championship against Serena Deeb. In the opening stages, Storm performed a running hip attack to Deeb, but Deeb responded with a twisting neckbreaker on the floor for a two-count. Deeb then locked in an Octopus Hold on Storm, but Storm reached the ropes. Storm then delivered a backstabber, a DDT and a Perfect Plex to Deeb for a two-count. Deeb then delivered two swinging neckbreakers, a German suplex and a Pepsi Twist to Storm for a two-count. Deeb performed an uppercut and an inside cradle on Storm for a two-count. Deeb locked in a single-leg Boston Crab on Storm, but Storm escaped and delivered the Storm Zero for a two-count. Storm attempted another Storm Zero on the apron, but Deeb reversed and performed a dragon screw leg whip through the ropes there times. Deeb then two Deebtoxes, including one on the apron for a two-count. As Deeb went to the top rope, Storm stopped her, delivered an avalanche piledriver and the Storm Zero, and pinned Deeb to retain her Women's World Championship.

In the fourth match, Orange Cassidy faced Trent Beretta. The license of Where is My Mind? was reacquired by AEW. In the opening stages, Cassidy performed a satellite DDT and an elbow suicida. Beretta delivered two german suplexes and a saito suplex. Beretta then delivered a gotch piledriver on the apron to Cassidy and attempted a piledriver on the steel steps, but Cassidy escaped and delivered Beach Break on the floor and then a Michinoku Driver back in the ring for a two-count. Cassidy attempted a Stundog Millionaire, but Beretta countered it into a half-and-half suplex and then the Dudebuster for a two-count. Beretta attempted another piledriver, but Cassidy reversed it into Beach Break for a two-count. Cassidy attempted the Orange Punch, but Beretta transitioned it into the Gogoplata; Cassidy reversed the Gogoplata into a cradle for the three-count.

Next, Chris Jericho defended the FTW Championship against Hook and Katsuyori Shibata in an FTW Rules match. In the opening stages, Hook delivered a T-Bone suplex to Shibata and a German suplex to Jericho. Jericho delivered a snap suplex to Hook and brought out a bag full of dice and poured it on the ring. Shibata then delivered a brainbuster to Jericho on the dice. Hook and Shibata delivered a double backdrop driver to Jericho. Hook delivered a Northern Lights suplex to Shibata but Shibata responded with a belly-to-belly suplex. Hook and Shibata then took turns beating Jericho with a kendo stick. Shibata delivered a Death Valley Driver to Hook onto Jericho on a table. Shibata locked in an Indian Deathlock on Jericho, but Hook broke up the submission hold. Hook delivered a saito suplex to Shibata, allowing Jericho to deliver the Codebreaker for a two-count. Jericho attempted the Judas Effect, but Hook ducked and locked in RedRum. As Jericho was about the tap out, Big Bill came out and attacked Hook. Big Bill attempted to chokeslam Hook through a table, but Hook countered and delivered a T-bone suplex to Big Bill through the table. Shibata and Hook then locked in a heel hook and the RedRum respectively on Jericho, but a masked man came out and hit both Shibata and Hook with a trash can. The masked man was revealed to be Bryan Keith, allowing Jericho to deliver the Judas Effect to Shibata and pin him to retain the title.

After that, Jon Moxley faced Konosuke Takeshita (accompanied by Don Callis) in a title eliminator match, where if Takeshita won, he would receive a future match for Moxley's IWGP World Heavyweight Championship. In the opening stages, Takeshita delivered a running single-arm DDT and a deadlift brainbuster to Moxley. Moxley performed an Ace Crusher and attempted a triangle choke, but Takeshita escaped and delivered a Last Ride powerbomb for a two-count. Moxley delivered a suicide dive to Takeshita and a lariat in the ring. Takeshita performed an overhook tombstone piledriver followed by a wheelbarrow suplex and then attempted the Powerdrive Knee, but Moxley impeded with the Paradigm Shift. Takeshita delivered a pair of elbow strikes and the Powerdrive Knee for a two-count. Takeshita then delivered a Death Rider for a nearfall. Don Callis told Takeshita to carry a steel chair, but the referee removed it. Callis slid another steel chair back in the ring, but as Takeshita attempted to use it, Moxley delivered a Curb Stomp to him onto the steel chair and then the Death Rider for the win.

Next, Adam Copeland defended the AEW TNT Championship against Malakai Black in a Barbed Wire Steel Cage match. In the opening stages, Copeland delivered a flapjack to Black and powerbombed him into the cage for a two-count. Copeland delivered an impaler DDT to Black and attempted a spear, but Black moved out of the way. Black then sent Copeland into a barbed wire turnbuckle. Black delivered a roundhouse kick and raked a barbed wire bat across the face of Copeland. Black attempted a Con-chair-to with the barbed wire bat, but Copeland moved out of the way and hit Black in the stomach with the barbed wire bat. Black delivered a sunset flip powerbomb to Copeland through a table for a two-count. Black then attempted the Black Mass, but Copeland ducked and delivered a spear for a two-count. Copeland carried the barbed wire bat, hit it on the face of Black and then raked it on Black's head. Copeland delivered a tombstone piledriver to Black and wrapped him in barbed wire on a table. Copeland climbed to the top of the cage and delivered an elbow drop to Black through the table for a two-count. Copeland attempted another Spear, but Black impeded it with a Black Mass for a two-count. As Black was making his way to the floor, Copeland delivered a spear to him. Malakai Black's House of Black stablemates Buddy Matthews and Brody King came out and feigned aligning with Copeland until King delivered a lariat to Copeland. The House of Black continue beating down Copeland, with Matthews and King putting a barbed wire crown of thorns around Copeland's head. The lights then turn red and the debuting Gangrel then came out from inside the ring and spat red mist into both King and Matthews. Gangrel then delivered impaler DDTs to both King and Matthews. Black delivered a Black Mass to Gangrel, but Copeland then delivered a spear to Black and locked in a barbed wire-assisted crossface on Black. Black passed out and the referee called for the bell, thus Copeland retained his TNT Championship. After the match, Copeland and Gangrel, former members of The Brood, made their way to the ramp as Copeland raised his TNT Championship.

The eight match was the first in what AEW promoted as a triple main event, in which Willow Nightingale (accompanied by Stokely Hathaway and Kris Statlander) defended the AEW TBS Championship against Mercedes Moné. In the opening stages, Moné attempted a baseball slide to Nightingale to the outside, but Nightingale caught her and delivered a Doctor Bomb on the apron. Moné delivered a diving meteora to Nightingale for a two-count. Nightingale attempted a bodyslam to Moné, but Moné escaped and delivered a backstabber. Nightingale locked in an ankle lock on Moné, but Moné escaped and went through the ropes and got pounced by Nightingale. Nightingale then delivered a spinebuster for a two-count. Nightingale attempted another Doctor Bomb, but Moné escaped and delivered a knee strike. Nightingale then delivered a deadlift powerbomb and a fisherman suplex to Moné for a two-count. Nightingale delivered a Death Valley Driver to Moné into the turbuckles and attempted a cannonball in the corner, but Moné escaped and delivered a middle-rope meteora for a two-count. Moné delivered another meteora off the apron to Nightingale on the outside and then pushed Statlander. Statlander and Hathaway, who were infuriated with Moné actions, then distract the referee, allowing Nightingale to deliver another Doctor Bomb for a two-count. Moné then delivered the Moné Maker and pinned Nightingale to win the TBS Championship. After the match, Hathaway is shouting at Nightingale and Statlander then shoves Hathaway. As Nightingale and Statlander are making their way up the ramp, Statlander pushed Nightingale to the ground and delivered a discus lariat, thus turning heel for the first time in her AEW career, and Hathaway became Statlander's assistant.

The second match of the triple main event saw Swerve Strickland (accompanied by Prince Nana) defended the AEW World Championship against Christian Cage (accompanied by The Patriarchy – Killswitch, Nick Wayne, and Mother Wayne). In the opening stages, Strickland attempted a suplex, but Christian escaped and delivered a reverse DDT and a frog splash for a two-count. Christian delivered a sunset flip powerbomb and attempted a spear, but Strickland feigned being tired and delivered a powerslam for a two-count. Strickland delivered a neckbreaker and performed a Fosbury Flop to Christian. Mother Wayne then grabbed the AEW World Championship, but Prince Nana seized the title from her. Nick told the referee that Nana was with the title and got ejected from ringside. As Mother Wayne was distracting the referee, Killswitch accidentally headbutted Christian, allowing Strickland to deliver a Swerve Stomp to Killswitch. Strickland attempted the Swerve Stomp to Christian, but Christian moved out the way and delivered a spear to him for a two-count. The referee then ejected The Patriarchy from ringside after seeing that they were trying to interfere again, allowing Strickland to deliver a rolling flatliner to Christian for a two-count and then a Swerve Stomp off the apron. As Christian was taking the referee's attention, Nick Wayne came back out and delivered Wayne's World to Strickland on the outside, allowing Christian to deliver his Killswitch finisher to Strickland back in the ring for a two-count. Nana then came out with a metal pipe to chase out Nick. Christian attempted another Killswitch to Strickland on the announce table, but Strickland escaped and delivered a Swerve Stomp to him onto the announce table. Strickland then attempted the JML Driver back in the ring, but Christian countered it into a victory roll for a two-count. Christian attempted a spear, but Strickland impeded it with a House Call in mid-air. Strickland then delivered another Swerve Stomp and then the House Call for the pin and the win.

=== Main event ===
The final match of the night, and the third in the triple main event, was the Anarchy in the Arena match, which saw The Elite (Kazuchika Okada, Jack Perry and The Young Bucks – Matthew Jackson and Nicholas Jackson) face Team AEW (Bryan Danielson, Darby Allin and FTR – Dax Harwood and Cash Wheeler). As Jack Perry was making his entrance, Danielson and FTR attacked The Elite. Then Darby came out and joined the match while his music continued to play. Then Matthew told production to turn off the music and to play The Young Buck's new theme music which proceeded to play. Shortly after, Danielson told production and told them to play his ROH entrance music. In the opening stages, Darby delivered a Coffin Drop from the balcony onto the crowd. Matthew then told production to stop playing Danielson's music and there was no more music for the rest of the match. Okada then delivered a suicide dive to Danielson, while Darby put Perry's head into an ice bucket. Perry hit Darby with a steel pipe and The Bucks delivered a Shatter Machine to Harwood for a two-count. Back in the parking lot, Perry hit Darby full speed with a school bus. Harwood then delivered a spike piledriver to Matthew on the apron. Wheeler then hit a powerplex on Nicholas for a two-count as Okada broke up the pin. Okada then hit an Air Raid Crash and a diving elbow drop to Harwood for a two-count. Darby made his way to the ring and delivered a Code Red to Okada for a two-count. The Bucks then powerbombed Darby onto a set of chairs and threw him down an elevator. The Bucks then delivered an assisted tombstone piledriver to Danielson onto the poker chips on the set. Harwood delivered a DDT to Matthew on the poker chips and landed a piledriver to Nicholas on the ramp. Okada then set up a table on the entrance way and Nicholas delivered a swanton bomb through the table to Wheeler. Perry then brought out AEW president Tony Khan from backstage. Darby brought a flamethrower and lit Perry legitimately on fire. The Bucks then carried a pair of fire extinguishers and sprayed Perry. The Bucks started beating down Darby and placed him on a garbage can. Nicholas then attempted a 450° splash to Darby onto the garbage can, but Darby moved out of the way. Darby delivered the Coffin Drop to Okada, but The Bucks broke up the pin attempt. Wheeler delivered a brainbuster to Okada, a clothesline to Matthew and, alongside Harwood, a Shatter Machine to Nicholas. Harwood then attempted a piledriver to Nicholas, but Matthew impeded it with an exploding chair on Harwood's head. The Bucks then double superkicked Wheeler, allowing Okada to wear a sleeve full of thumbtacks and hit the Rainmaker lariat on Wheeler. Okada then brought out a box of Reebok shoes with thumbtacks underneath them. The Bucks then lowered a cable from the ceiling with Darby tied in between it. The Bucks then superkicked Darby with the thumbtacked Reebok shoes. Matthew then attempted to superkick Danielson, but Danielson moved out of the way and Matthew accidentally superkicked Nicholas. Danielson then hit a Busaiku Knee on Okada. Danielson delivered a chair assisted Busaiku Knee to Nicholas, but Okada broke up the pin. Okada then hit the Rainmaker lariat to Danielson and The Bucks hit the EVP Trigger on Danielson. As Danielson was getting back to his feet, Perry hit a running knee and pinned Danielson to win the match.

== Reception ==
Wrestling journalist Dave Meltzer of the Wrestling Observer Newsletter, reviewing the buy-in, rated Deonna Purrazzo vs. Thunder Rosa 2.75 (2 3/4) stars and the trios match 3 stars. For the PPV event, he rated the following matches, the International Championship bout 4.75 stars (4 3/4), (the highest on the card), the Unification Trios match 4 stars, the Women’s World Championship bout 3.5 stars (3 1/2), the Orange Cassidy/Beretta match 3.75 stars (3 3/4), the FTW Championship match 2.25 stars (2 1/4) (the lowest on the card), the IWGP Heavyweight Eliminator Match, TNT Championship, and the AEW World Championship match all 4.25 (4 1/4) stars, the TBS Championship and the Anarchy in the Arena match both 4.5 stars (4 1/2) (The first anarchy in the arena match not to be rated at 5 Stars). This was also the first AEW PPV in 2024 to not have a match rated 5 stars or more by Dave Meltzer.

Mike Malkasian of Wrestling Headlines gave the overall show an 8.75/10, saying "AEW delivers on PPV. MJF returning was a hell of a surprise, and that kicked off the show. Ospreay survived a big injury scare and delivered with Roddy, Swerve retained in an excellent match, and Copeland vs. Black is everything I wanted and more. Anarchy in the Arena was just fun. Just an insane, entertaining, car crash main event. Nothing on this show was even close to bad".

Doc-Chris Mueller of Bleacher Report graded the show a B+, saying "AEW Double or Nothing 2024 delivered what might be the widest selection of wrestling styles on one card. Even if you hated some of what we saw on Sunday, chances are good that you probably loved something else from the show. Picking the best performance on the card is nearly impossible because so many bouts worked well in different ways. The only major complaint one could levy is the runtime.

John Canton of TJR Wrestling.net gave the overall show an 8.25/10, saying "This was a great and entertaining show that likely satisfied the AEW fanbase very well. The main event left a lasting impression due to how insane it was with so many big spots, blood and even fire as well. You don’t see many flamethrower spots in pro wrestling, so kudos for the creativity there. With that said, it’s a bit difficult to summarize it all considering this was nearly a five-hour show and I think that's too long, quite frankly. It does hurt the show a bit because the crowd sounded like they were exhausted at times and barely reacting to certain things.

Joe Rivera of USA Today simply said "In all, Double or Nothing was one of AEW's more enigmatic shows in recent memory. There were more downs than ups on the card, but as is the case with some PPVs for the company, the last hour of the show had enough juice to drown out the bad stuff on the card".

== Results ==
No.	Results	Stipulations	Times
1^{P}	Deonna Purrazzo defeated Thunder Rosa by pinfall	Singles match	10:15
2^{P}	The Acclaimed (Max Caster, Anthony Bowens, and Billy Gunn) defeated Cage of Agony (Brian Cage, Toa Liona, and Bishop Kaun) by pinfall	Trios match	11:45
3	Will Ospreay defeated Roderick Strong (c) (with Matt Taven and Mike Bennett) by pinfall	Singles match for the AEW International Championship	17:40
4	The Bang Bang Gang (Jay White, Austin Gunn, and Colten Gunn) (c) defeated Death Triangle (Pac, Penta El Zero Miedo, and Rey Fénix) (with Alex Abrahantes) by pinfall	Trios match for the Unified World Trios Championship	12:20
5	"Timeless" Toni Storm (c) (with Luther and Mariah May) defeated Serena Deeb by pinfall	Singles match for the AEW Women's World Championship	15:00
6	Orange Cassidy defeated Trent Beretta by pinfall	Singles match	13:55
7	Chris Jericho (c) defeated Hook and Katsuyori Shibata by pinfall	Three-way FTW Rules match for the FTW Championship	12:40
8	Jon Moxley defeated Konosuke Takeshita (with Don Callis) by pinfall	IWGP World Heavyweight Championship Eliminator match Had Takeshita won, he would have received a future IWGP World Heavyweight Championship match.	17:20
9	Adam Copeland (c) defeated Malakai Black by technical knockout	Barbed Wire Steel Cage match for the AEW TNT Championship; Had Copeland lost, he would have bent the knee and joined The House of Black.	20:20
10	Mercedes Moné defeated Willow Nightingale (c) (with Stokely Hathaway and Kris Statlander) by pinfall	Singles match for the AEW TBS Championship	18:00
11	Swerve Strickland (c) (with Prince Nana) defeated Christian Cage (with Killswitch, Nick Wayne, and Mother Wayne) by pinfall	Singles match for the AEW World Championship	24:50
12	The Elite (Matthew Jackson, Nicholas Jackson, Kazuchika Okada, and Jack Perry) defeated Team AEW (Bryan Danielson, Darby Allin, Cash Wheeler, and Dax Harwood) by pinfall	Anarchy in the Arena match	29:55
(c) / – the champion(s) heading into the match; P / – the match was broadcast on the pre-show

=== FTW Contender Series ===
Qualifiers (Collision, May 18)
Hook	Sub
Johnny TV	3:25
Katsuyori Shibata	Pin
Rocky Romero	10:00
Bryan Keith	Pin
Boulder	1:40

Eliminator final (Dynamite, May 22)
Hook	Sub
Katsuyori Shibata	Sub
Bryan Keith	6:30
