= Gates of Agony =

Professional wrestling tag team

- Gates of Agony (Toa Liona (right) and Bishop Kaun (left)) at AEW Dynamite in August 2026

Statistics
- Name(s): Gates of Agony; GOA
- Members: Bishop Kaun; Toa Liona
- Debut: April 1, 2022
- Years active: 2022–present

Gates of Agony (GOA) is a professional wrestling tag team consisting of Bishop Kaun and Toa Liona. They are signed to All Elite Wrestling (AEW), where they are members of The Demand stable alongside leader Ricochet.

== History ==
=== All Elite Wrestling / Ring of Honor (2022–present) ===
==== Tully Blanchard Enterprises (2022) ====
At the ROH pay-per-view Supercard of Honor XV in April 2022, Bishop Kaun and Toa Liona teamed for the first time as "Gates of Agony" to defeat Shinobi Shadow Squad (Cheeseburger and Eli Isom). During the event, Gates of Agony were announced as members of Tully Blanchard's new stable, Tully Blanchard Enterprises, along with Brian Cage. Gates of Agony made their tag team debut for ROH's sister promotion, All Elite Wrestling (AEW), on the July 6 episode of AEW Rampage, defeating Jonathan Gresham (the ROH World Champion) and Lee Moriarty when Gresham turned on Moriarty and joined Tully Blanchard Enterprises.

==== The Embassy / Mogul Embassy; Cage of Agony (2022–2024) ====
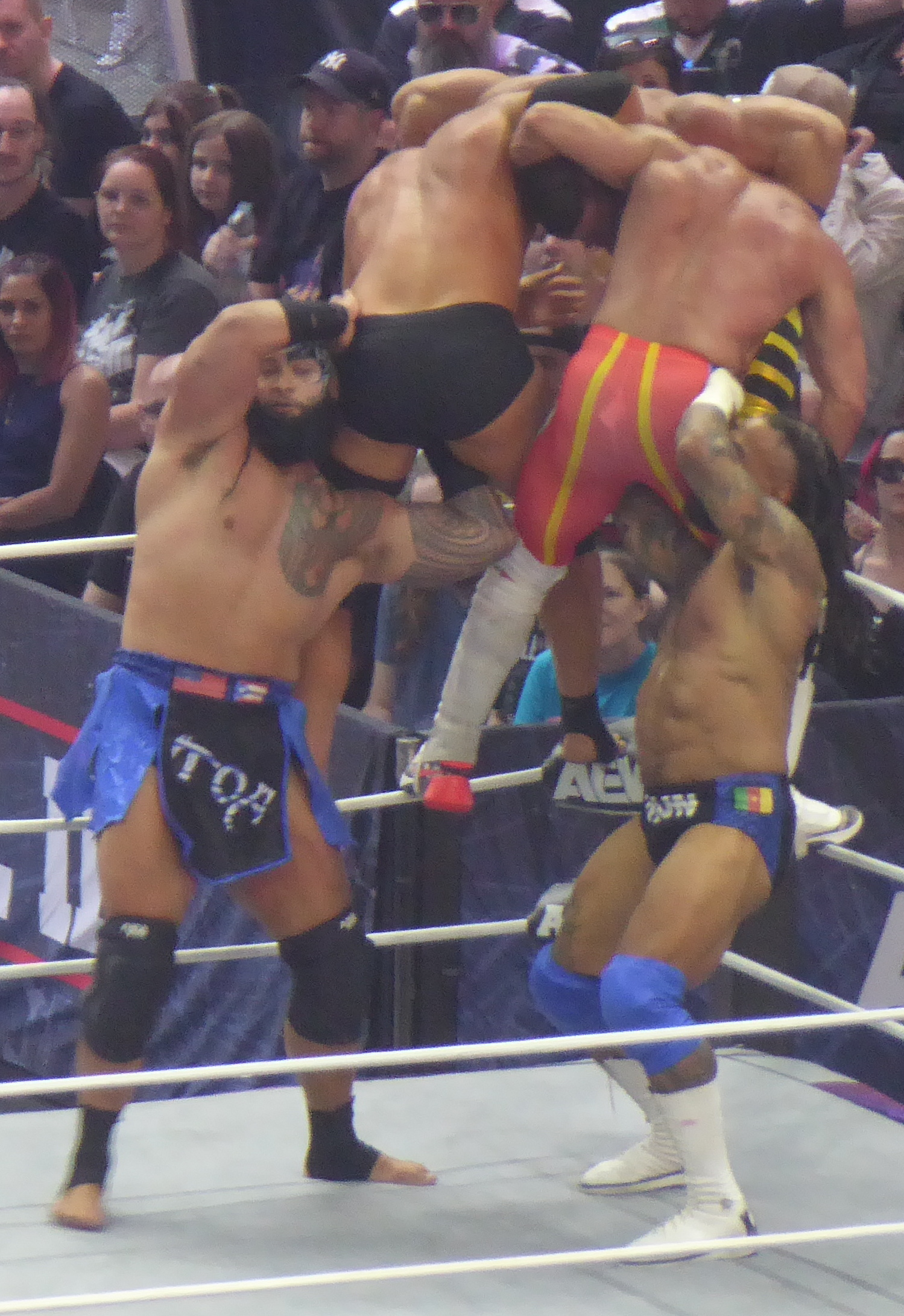
Gates of Agony - Toa Liona (left) and Bishop Kaun (right) - delivering a double powerbomb at All In 2024.

On July 23, 2022, at Death Before Dishonor, Prince Nana was announced as having purchased Tully Blanchard Enterprises and folded it into his long-running stable, the Embassy. At the event, Gates of Agony and Brian Cage wrestled their first match as a unit, defeating Alex Zayne, Blake Christian, and Tony Deppen in a six-man tag team match. Also at the event, Gresham resigned from ROH, leaving Gates of Agony and Cage as the only wrestlers in the Embassy. In October 2022 at Battle of the Belts IV, Gates of Agony unsuccessfully challenged FTR for the ROH World Tag Team Championship.

In December 2022 at Final Battle, Gates of Agony and Cage defeated Dalton Castle and the Boys to win the ROH World Six-Man Tag Team Championship. At Supercard of Honor in March 2023, they successfully defended the Championship against AR Fox, Blake Christian, and Metalik. At Death Before Dishonor in July 2023, they successfully defended the Championship against Leon Ruffin, Master Wato, and Ryusuke Taguchi. In September 2023 at Grand Slam, they lost the titles to The Elite.

In April 2023, the Embassy merged with Swerve Strickland's Mogul Affiliates stable to form a new stable, Mogul Embassy. At Forbidden Door in June 2023, Gates of Agony, Cage, and Strickland defeated Chaos in an eight-man tag team match.

In November 2023 on AEW Dynamite, Gates of Agony and Cage defeated The Elite to regain the ROH World Six-Man Tag Team Championship. At Final Battle in December 2023, they successfully defended the titles against The Mighty Don't Kneel. In January 2024 on AEW Dynamite, Gates of Agony and Cage lost the titles to Bullet Club Gold.

In May 2024, Gates of Agony and Cage attacked Strickland and split from Nana, disbanding Mogul Embassy. Later that month, they dubbed themselves "Cage of Agony". At Double or Nothing in May 2024, Cage of Agony lost to The Acclaimed and Billy Gunn. At All In in August 2024, Cage of Agony and Undisputed Kingdom lost to Dustin Rhodes, Katsuyori Shibata, Marshall Von Erich, Ross Von Erich, and Sammy Guevara in a 10-man tag team match.

==== Tag team; The Demand (2024–present) ====
In October 2024, Brian Cage joined the Don Callis Family, disbanding Cage of Agony and leaving Gates of Agony as a tag team. At Final Battle in December 2024, Gates of Agony defeated LEEJ (E. J. Nduka and Lee Johnson). On April 16 at Dynamite: Spring BreakThru, Gates of Agony unsuccessfully challenged The Hurt Syndicate for the AEW World Tag Team Championship.

In July 2025, Gates of Agony aligned themselves with Ricochet and shortened their name to "GOA". That same month, they entered the AEW World Tag Team Championship eliminator tournament, being eliminated in the first round by Brodido (Bandido and Brody King). In August 2025, at Forbidden Door, GOA and Ricochet defeated JetSpeed and Michael Oku; at the same event, they attacked The Hurt Syndicate, costing them the AEW World Tag Team Championship. Later that month, GOA and Ricochet unsuccessfully challenged The Opps for the AEW World Trios Championship, with Hurt Syndicate member MVP costing them the match. At All Out in September 2025, GOA and Ricochet (now known as "The Demand") defeated The Hurt Syndicate. Later that month, GOA unsuccessfully challenged AEW World Tag Team Champions Brodido on an episode of Dynamite. The Demand continued their feud with the Hurt Syndicate, but were defeated in a rematch at Dynamite: Title Tuesday on October 7 in a street fight and on October 12 at WrestleDream in a tornado trios match.

On the July 29, 2026, episode of Dynamite, The Demand defeated The Conglomeration (Orange Cassidy, Roderick Strong, and Kyle O'Reilly) to win the AEW World Trios Championship. Their reign would only last a week as they would lose the titles to Adam Page and Brodido (Brody King and Bandido) on August 5 at Grand Slam Mexico.

=== New Japan Pro-Wrestling (2023; 2026) ===
In November and December 2023, Gates of Agony wrestled a series of matches in Japan for New Japan Pro-Wrestling (NJPW), competing in the 2023 World Tag League. The duo finished with four points, placing seventh out of eight teams in block 'A', and thus did not qualify for the semi-finals. During their tour with NJPW, they also faced teams such as Bullet Club, Chaos, House of Torture, The Mighty Don't Kneel, and United Empire. On February 27, 2026 at The New Beginning USA, GOA unsuccessfully challenged Knock Out Brothers for the IWGP Tag Team Championship.

== Professional wrestling style and persona ==
Gates of Agony's finishing move is a double crucifix powerbomb known variously as "Fall from Heaven", "Heaven's Gate", or "Open the Gate".

== Championships and accomplishments ==
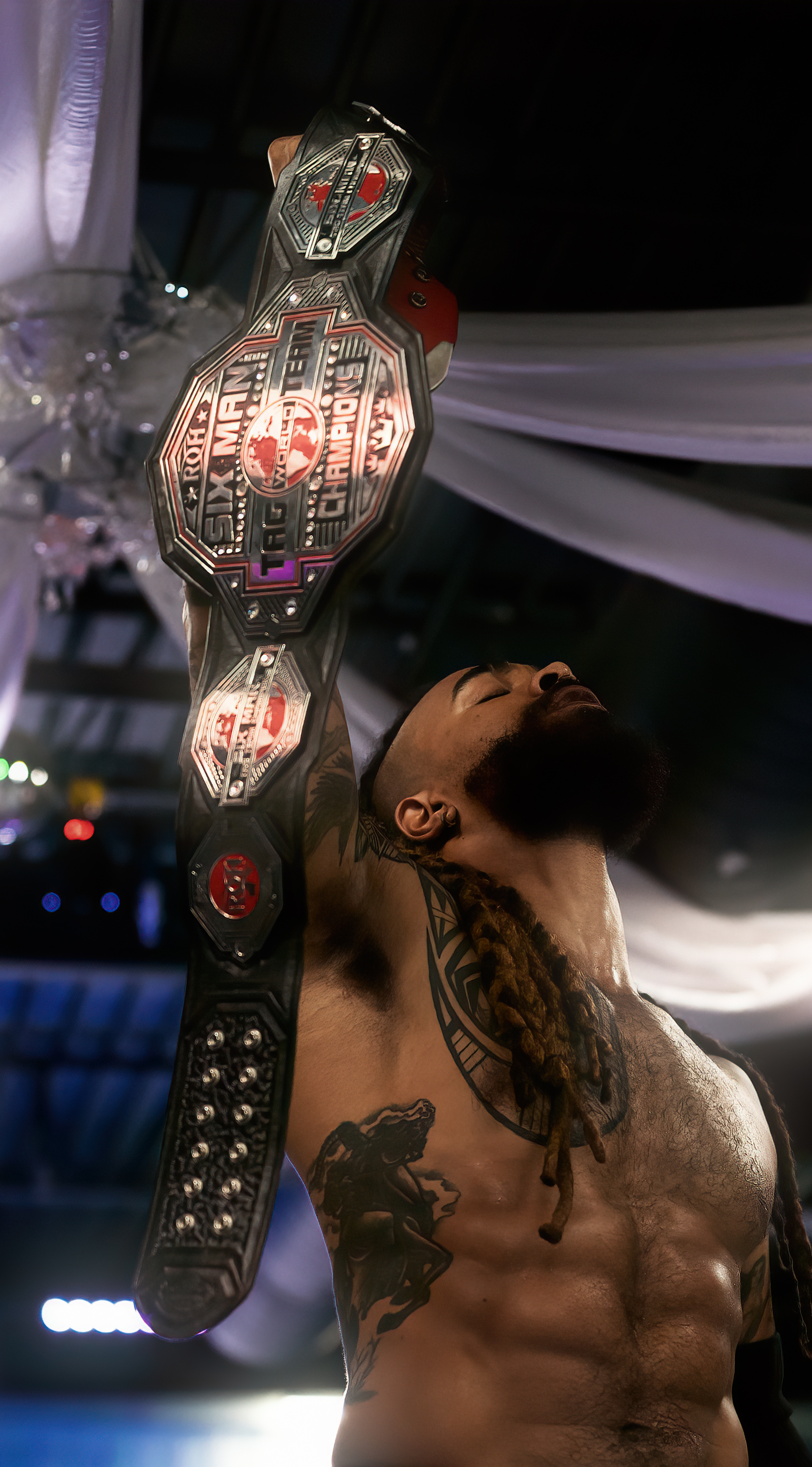
Bishop Kaun as the ROH World Six-Man Tag Team Champion

- All Elite Wrestling
  - AEW World Trios Championship (1 time) – with Ricochet
- Ring of Honor
  - ROH World Six-Man Tag Team Championship (2 times) – with Brian Cage

== See also ==
- The Embassy / Mogul Embassy
