= Supercard of Honor XV =

2022 Ring of Honor professional wrestling event

- Promotional poster featuring Jonathan Gresham and Bandido
- Promotion: Ring of Honor
- Date: April 1, 2022
- City: Garland, Texas
- Venue: Curtis Culwell Center
- Attendance: 2,000

Event chronology
← Previous; Final Battle	Next → Death Before Dishonor

Supercard of Honor chronology
← Previous; XIV (cancelled)	Next → 2023

Supercard of Honor XV was a professional wrestling pay-per-view produced by American promotion Ring of Honor (ROH). It took place on April 1, 2022, at the Curtis Culwell Center in the Dallas suburb of Garland, Texas. It was the fifteenth event in the Supercard of Honor chronology, and the first edition since the G1 Supercard in 2019; 2020's planned Supercard of Honor XIV was canceled due to the COVID-19 pandemic. It was also ROH's first live event after a three-month hiatus following Final Battle in December 2021, as well as the final event under the Sinclair Broadcasting Group's ownership before the completion of the promotion's March 2022 sale to All Elite Wrestling (AEW) president Tony Khan.

Twelve matches were contested at the event, including four on the pre-show. In the main event, Jonathan Gresham defeated Bandido in a Winner Takes All match to become the undisputed ROH World Champion. In other prominent matches, Wheeler Yuta defeated Josh Woods in a Pure Wrestling Rules match to win the ROH Pure Championship, Minoru Suzuki defeated Rhett Titus to win the ROH World Television Championship, FTR (Dax Harwood and Cash Wheeler) defeated The Briscoe Brothers (Jay Briscoe and Mark Briscoe) to win the ROH World Tag Team Championship, and Mercedes Martinez defeated Willow Nightingale by submission to win the interim ROH Women's World Championship. This event marked the ROH returns of The Young Bucks (Matt Jackson and Nick Jackson) and Samoa Joe.

== Production ==
Other on-screen personnel
Role:	Name:
Commentators	Ian Riccaboni
Commentators	Caprice Coleman
Ring announcer	Bobby Cruise
Backstage interviewer	Denise Salcedo
Referees	Stephon Smith
Referees	Paul Turner
Referees	Mike Posey

=== Background ===
On October 27, 2021, ROH announced that they would go on hiatus for the first quarter of 2022 in order to reimagine the company, releasing all their wrestlers and staff from their contracts after their Final Battle event last December; the promotion was expected to resume operations in April 2022. On January 10, 2022, ROH announced their return with Supercard of Honor XV, emanating from the Curtis Culwell Center in Garland, Texas on April 1.

On March 2, 2022, during All Elite Wrestling (AEW)'s live weekly series, AEW Dynamite, owner & executive Tony Khan announced that he had acquired Ring of Honor from the Sinclair Broadcast Group. As a result, Supercard of Honor XV was the first ROH event produced on Khan's watch.

=== Storylines ===
The event featured professional wrestling matches that involved different wrestlers from pre-existing scripted feuds and storylines. Wrestlers portrayed villains, heroes, or less distinguishable characters in scripted events that built tension and culminated in a wrestling match or series of matches.

At Final Battle, Jonathan Gresham defeated Jay Lethal in an ROH World Championship match, where the original ROH World Title belt was at stake. Gresham was originally supposed to wrestle then-champion Bandido for the title, but Bandido had contracted COVID-19 and was pulled from the show. While Gresham would appear in different promotions defending his championship, Bandido would do the same with his. Both men even defended their respective titles on the first show of Gresham's new promotion, TERMINUS. On January 20, it was announced that at Supercard of Honor XV, Bandido and Gresham would face each other in a championship unification match.

At Final Battle, The Briscoe Brothers (Jay Briscoe and Mark Briscoe) defeated The OGK (Matt Taven and Mike Bennett) to win their record twelfth ROH World Tag Team Championship. However, during their celebration, the Briscoes would be confronted by All Elite Wrestling tag team FTR (Dax Harwood and Cash Wheeler), resulting in the two teams getting into a pull-apart brawl. On February 17, it was announced that the Briscoes would defend the ROH World Tag Team Championship at Supercard of Honor, and their opponents were soon confirmed to be FTR on March 18.

On the January 13 episode of Impact Wrestling's weekly television series, Impact!, AAA Reina de Reinas Champion Deonna Purrazzo defeated ROH Women's World Champion Rok-C in a title vs. title match to claim the latter's title. On April 1, Purrazzo would be booked for the Multiverse of Matches at WrestleCon, which was held on the same night as Supercard of Honor XV. As a result, ROH announced that Willow Nightingale and Mercedes Martinez would face off at Supercard of Honor to determine an interim champion, with the winner facing Purrazzo at a later date in a championship unification match.

== Results ==
No.	Results	Stipulations	Times
1^{P}	Colt Cabana defeated Blake Christian by pinfall	Singles match	8:05
2^{P}	AQA defeated Miranda Alize by pinfall	Singles match	8:15
3^{P}	Gates of Agony (Jasper Kaun and Toa Liona) (with Tully Blanchard) defeated the Shinobi Shadow Squad (Cheeseburger and Eli Isom) by pinfall	Tag team match	2:15
4^{P}	Dalton Castle (with The Boys) defeated Joe Hendry by pinfall	Singles match	9:40
5	Swerve Strickland defeated Alex Zayne by pinfall	Singles match	11:40
6	Brian Cage (with Tully Blanchard) defeated Ninja Mack by pinfall	Singles match	2:50
7	Jay Lethal defeated Lee Moriarty (with Matt Sydal) by pinfall	Singles match	14:50
8	Mercedes Martinez defeated Willow Nightingale by submission	Singles match for the interim ROH Women's World Championship	12:45
9	FTR (Dax Harwood and Cash Wheeler) defeated The Briscoe Brothers (Jay Briscoe and Mark Briscoe) (c) by pinfall	Tag team match for the ROH World Tag Team Championship	27:25
10	Minoru Suzuki defeated Rhett Titus (c) by pinfall	Singles match for the ROH World Television Championship	6:00
11	Wheeler Yuta defeated Josh Woods (c) by pinfall	Pure wrestling rules match for the ROH Pure Championship	12:55
12	Jonathan Gresham (c) defeated Bandido (c) (with Chavo Guerrero, Jr.) by pinfall	Winner Takes All match to determine the Undisputed ROH World Champion	24:55
(c) / – the champion(s) heading into the match; P / – the match was broadcast on the pre-show

== See also ==
- 2022 in professional wrestling
- List of Ring of Honor pay-per-view events
