= Death Before Dishonor (2022) =

Ring of Honor pay-per-view event

- Promotional poster featuring various ROH wrestlers
- Promotion: Ring of Honor
- Date: July 23, 2022
- City: Lowell, Massachusetts
- Venue: Tsongas Center
- Attendance: 3,100

Event chronology
← Previous; Supercard of Honor	Next → Final Battle

Death Before Dishonor chronology
← Previous; 2021	Next → 2023

The 2022 Death Before Dishonor was a professional wrestling pay-per-view event produced by American promotion Ring of Honor (ROH). It was the 19th Death Before Dishonor and took place on July 23, 2022, at the Tsongas Center in Lowell, Massachusetts. It was ROH's first live event under the full ownership of All Elite Wrestling (AEW) president Tony Khan.

Eleven matches were contested at the event, including four on the pre-show. In the main event, FTR (Cash Wheeler and Dax Harwood) defeated The Briscoe Brothers (Jay Briscoe and Mark Briscoe) in a two-out-of-three-falls match to retain the ROH World Tag Team Championship. In other prominent matches, Samoa Joe defeated Jay Lethal by submission to retain the ROH World Television Championship, Wheeler Yuta defeated Daniel Garcia in a Pure Wrestling Rules match to retain the ROH Pure Championship, and in the opening bout Claudio Castagnoli defeated Jonathan Gresham to win the ROH World Championship.

== Production ==
Other on-screen personnel
Role:	Name:
Commentators	Ian Riccaboni
Commentators	Caprice Coleman
Commentators	William Regal (ROH World and Pure title matches)
Ring announcer	Bobby Cruise
Backstage interviewer	Lexy Nair
Referees	Stephon Smith
Referees	Paul Turner
Referees	Mike Posey
Pure title match judges	Josh Woods
Pure title match judges	John Walters
Pure title match judges	Ace Steel

=== Background ===
During a post-show media scrum for AEW x NJPW: Forbidden Door on June 26, 2022, All Elite Wrestling (AEW) president Tony Khan, who became the owner of Ring of Honor (ROH), announced that Death Before Dishonor would take place on July 23, 2022, at the Tsongas Center in Lowell, Massachusetts and would air on pay-per-view.

=== Storylines ===
The event featured professional wrestling matches that involved different wrestlers from pre-existing scripted feuds and storylines. Wrestlers portrayed villains, heroes, or less distinguishable characters in scripted events that built tension and culminated in a wrestling match or series of matches. ROH's weekly series, Ring of Honor Wrestling, was on hiatus prior to its acquisition by All Elite Wrestling (AEW) president Tony Khan. As a result, storylines were instead produced on AEW's weekly television programs, Dynamite and Rampage; their supplementary online streaming shows, Dark and Elevation; as well as promotional videos on AEW's YouTube channel.

At Supercard of Honor, Jay Lethal turned heel by delivering a low blow to Lee Moriarty before beating him with a rope-assisted pinfall. He would later attack Moriarty's mentor Matt Sydal, who was in crutches, before being stopped by AEW producer and friend Sonjay Dutt. Later in the night, after Jonathan Gresham defeated Bandido to become the undisputed ROH World Champion, Gresham's former partner Lethal came out and declared he should be Gresham's next challenger. Dutt came out again to restrain Lethal, but would end help him in attacking both Gresham, Bandido, and soon Moriarty. The pair would later be stopped by Lethal's old mentor Samoa Joe, who was making his return to ROH since June 2015. Two weeks later on AEW Dynamite, Joe defeated Minoru Suzuki to win the ROH World Television Championship for the first time. After the match, Lethal and Dutt would arrive to give Joe a "present", which was Lethal giving Joe "the finger" in a cut-out gift box. The two then prepared to attack Joe before they were joined by former NBA player turned pro-wrestler Satnam Singh. In the coming weeks, Lethal, Dutt, and Singh continued to target Joe and his championship. At AEW Double or Nothing, after Joe lost to Adam Cole in the finals of the Men's Owen Hart Foundation Tournament, the trio attacked Joe during a backstage interview and injured his shoulder. Despite this, the three men still called out Joe to defend the title against Lethal. On the July 6 episode of Dynamite, it was announced that Joe would defend the ROH World Television Championship against Lethal at Death Before Dishonor.

In the ongoing feud between the Jericho Appreciation Society and the Blackpool Combat Club, the JAS' 2point0 (Matt Menard and Angelo Parker) and Daniel Garcia attacked ROH Pure Champion Wheeler Yuta after he defended the title against Tony Nese on the June 28 episode of AEW Dark. There, Garcia proclaimed he would strip Yuta of both his honor and title, before holding said title over a fallen Yuta. On the July 6 Dynamite, it was announced that Yuta and Garcia would face off for the Pure Championship at Death Before Dishonor.

At Supercard of Honor, FTR (Cash Wheeler and Dax Harwood) defeated The Briscoe Brothers (Jay Briscoe and Mark Briscoe) to win the ROH World Tag Team Championship. On the July 6 episode of Dynamite, FTR appeared in a backstage segment talking about how many people still don't see them as the best tag team in the world. As such, they challenged The Briscoes, who were now working for Impact Wrestling, to a rematch at Death Before Dishonor. The following day, the Briscoes responded on their Twitter account, going on about how they had been working several shows a day in order to provide for their families, including wrestling at Impact's Multiverse of Matches event before wrestling at Supercard of Honor. Now seeing FTR as the team being overworked, they officially accepted the title match for Death Before Dishonor. On July 15, during a face-to-face meeting between the two teams, a two-out-of-three-falls match stipulation was added to the match.

Since June 16, 2022, ROH Women's World Champion Mercedes Martinez and Serena Deeb began working as a tag team across AEW Dark: Elevation, AEW Dark, and more recently, AEW Rampage. The two would be undefeated, but it was clear from their performances that their matches were about being better than their partner. Deeb would even make it public that she has priorities in taking Martinez's title. On the July 8 episode of Rampage, after Martinez and Deeb won their match, the latter attacked the former before holding the title above her head. On July 12, it was announced that Deeb would challenge Martinez for the ROH Women's World Championship at Death Before Dishonor.

On the July 15 episode of Rampage, during the first week of Fyter Fest; Jonathan Gresham, who recently turned heel and aligned with Tully Blanchard's stable, Tully Blanchard Enterprises (Now renamed The Embassy), defeated Lee Moriarty to retain the ROH World Championship. In a post-match interview, Gresham would claim to be the best professional wrestler in the world, before being confronted by Claudio Castagnoli of the Blackpool Combat Club. As a result, Gresham would face Castagnoli for the title at Death Before Dishonor, marking Castagnoli's first ROH match in over a decade.

== Results ==
No.	Results	Stipulations	Times
1^{P}	Colt Cabana defeated Anthony Henry (with JD Drake) by pinfall	Singles match	10:00
2^{P}	The Trust Busters (Ari Daivari and Slim J) defeated The Shinobi Shadow Squad (Cheeseburger and Eli Isom) by pinfall	Tag team match	5:30
3^{P}	The Embassy (Brian Cage and the Gates of Agony (Jasper Kaun and Toa Liona)) (with Prince Nana) defeated Alex Zayne, Blake Christian, and Tony Deppen by pinfall	Six-man tag team match	11:35
4^{P}	Willow Nightingale defeated Allysin Kay by pinfall	Singles match	7:50
5	Claudio Castagnoli (with William Regal) defeated Jonathan Gresham (c) (with Prince Nana) by pinfall	Singles match for the ROH World Championship	11:30
6	Dalton Castle and The Boys (Brandon Tate and Brent Tate) defeated The Righteous (Vincent, Bateman, and Dutch) (c) (with Vita VonStarr) by pinfall	Six-man tag team match for the ROH World Six-Man Tag Team Championship	9:40
7	Wheeler Yuta (c) (with William Regal) defeated Daniel Garcia by pinfall	Pure wrestling rules match for the ROH Pure Championship	15:55
8	Rush (with José the Assistant) defeated Dragon Lee by pinfall	Singles match	15:50
9	Mercedes Martinez (c) defeated Serena Deeb by submission	Singles match for the ROH Women's World Championship	17:20
10	Samoa Joe (c) defeated Jay Lethal by submission	Singles match for the ROH World Television Championship	12:20
11	FTR (Cash Wheeler and Dax Harwood) (c) defeated The Briscoe Brothers (Jay Briscoe and Mark Briscoe) 2–1	Two-out-of-three-falls match for the ROH World Tag Team Championship	43:25
(c) / – the champion(s) heading into the match; P / – the match was broadcast on the pre-show

== See also ==
- 2022 in professional wrestling
- List of Ring of Honor pay-per-view events
