= Blake Christian =

American professional wrestler (born 1997)

- Christian in June 2024

Personal information
- Born: Christian Hubble; 22 July 1997 (age 29) Friendship, Tennessee, U.S.

Professional wrestling career
- Ring names: Blake Christian; Trey Baxter
- Billed height: 5 ft 10 in (178 cm)
- Billed weight: 174 lb (79 kg)
- Billed from: Jackson, Tennessee
- Trained by: SWAG Wrestling; Trent Ware; WWE Performance Center
- Debut: 2017

Christian Hubble (born July 22, 1997), better known by his ring name Blake Christian, is an American professional wrestler. He is signed to All Elite Wrestling (AEW) and its sister promotion Ring of Honor (ROH), where he is a member of The Lethal Twist and its sub-group The Swirl. He is one-third of the ROH World Six-Man Tag Team Champions with fellow stablemates Jay Lethal and Lee Johnson in their first reign as a team.

== Professional wrestling career ==
=== Independent circuit (2017–2021) ===
Christian began wrestling on the independent circuit in Tennessee in 2017 where he trained at the promotion "SWAG Wrestling". He spent three years with Game Changer Wrestling between 2019 and 2021.

On 19 October 2019, Christian debuted for Impact Wrestling at All Glory, defeating Alex Zayne and Mark Wheeler. On January 9, 2021, he made his pay-per-view debut at Genesis, competing in the 2021 Super X Cup. His final pay-per-view appearance was at No Surrender.

=== New Japan Pro-Wrestling (2020–2021) ===
On the August 14, 2020 episode of Strong, Christian made his New Japan Pro-Wrestling (NJPW) debut, teaming with Misterioso and P. J. Black in a losing effort against A. C. H., Alex Zayne and TJP. Christian then participated the 2021 New Japan Cup USA and was eliminated in the qualifying rounds by Chris Dickinson at Strong Style Evolved.

=== WWE (2021) ===
On February 13, 2021, it was reported WWE had signed Christian to a developmental contract. On June 15, 2021, he debuted on the NXT brand under the ring name Trey Baxter, losing to Kushida for the NXT Cruiserweight Championship. He wrestled a number of matches on NXT and 205 Live, with his final being on 8 October, in a loss to Grayson Waller. He was released on 4 November.

=== Return to the independent circuit (2021–present) ===
After being released from WWE, Christian resumed performing on the independent circuit. On 4 June 2023, Christian defeated Masha Slamovich and Rina Yamashita at Cage Of Survival 2 to win the GCW World Championship, his first ever title and world title of his career. On May 25, 2024, Christian was stripped of the title due to his participation in the Best of the Super Juniors 31 and not being able to defend the title at Cage of Survival 3, ending his reign at 356 days.

=== Return to NJPW (2022–2024, 2026) ===
On the February 17, 2022 episode of Strong, Christian made his return to NJPW, losing to Chris Bey. Christian would continue to make sporadic appearances on the Strong brand of NJPW. At Dominion 6.9 in Osaka-jo Hall, Christian was announced to make his debut in Japan as a participant in the Best of the Super Juniors 31, where he was placed in A-Block. Christian finished the tournament with 10 points and failed to advance to the playoff stage. In October 2026, Christian competed in the Super Junior Tag League as part of B-Block with his tag team partner in "The Swirl" Lee Johnson. The Swirl finished the tournament with eight 8 points but failed to advance to the finals due to losing the tiebreaker to the Ichiban Sweet Boys (Kosei Fujita and Robbie Eagles),

=== All Elite Wrestling / Ring of Honor (2022–present) ===
Christian in August 2026.

On the March 22, 2022 episode of AEW Dark, Christian made his All Elite Wrestling (AEW) debut defeating Rohit Raju. At Death Before Dishonor, Christian made his Ring of Honor debut teaming with Alex Zayne and Tony Deppen in a losing effort to Brian Cage, Bishop Kaun, and Toa Liona of The Embassy. On the September 2 episode of AEW Rampage, Christian fought Rey Fenix in a losing effort. At Final Battle, he teamed with AR Fox defeating Rush and Dralístico. On February 25, Christian faced Zack Sabre Jr. for the NJPW World Television Championship, in a losing effort. For the remainder of 2022 and 2023, Christian would mainly appear on ROH, Dark, and Dark: Elevation.

On December 20 at Final Battle, Christian participated in a Survival of the Fittest for the ROH World Television Championship, where he was the last man eliminated by Komander. In early 2025, Christian formed a tag team with Lee Johnson known as The Swirl. On the January 1, 2026 episode of Ring of Honor Wrestling, Christian and Johnson added Jay Lethal to their alliance with the trio going by the name of "The Lethal Twist". In March 2026, Christian signed an official contract with AEW. At Supercard of Honor on May 15, Christian unsuccessfully challenged Bandido for the ROH World Championship after a year-long feud. On August 21 at Death Before Dishonor, The Lethal Twist defeated Dalton Castle and The Outrunners (Turbo Floyd and Truth Magnum) to win the ROH World Six-Man Tag Team Championship.

== Championships and accomplishments ==
- Game Changer Wrestling
  - GCW World Championship (1 time)
- Pro Wrestling Illustrated
  - Ranked No. 64 of the top 500 singles wrestlers in the PWI 500 in 2024
- Ring of Honor
  - ROH World Six-Man Tag Team Championship (1 time, current) – with Jay Lethal and Lee Johnson
