= Toa Liona =

American professional wrestler (born 1991)

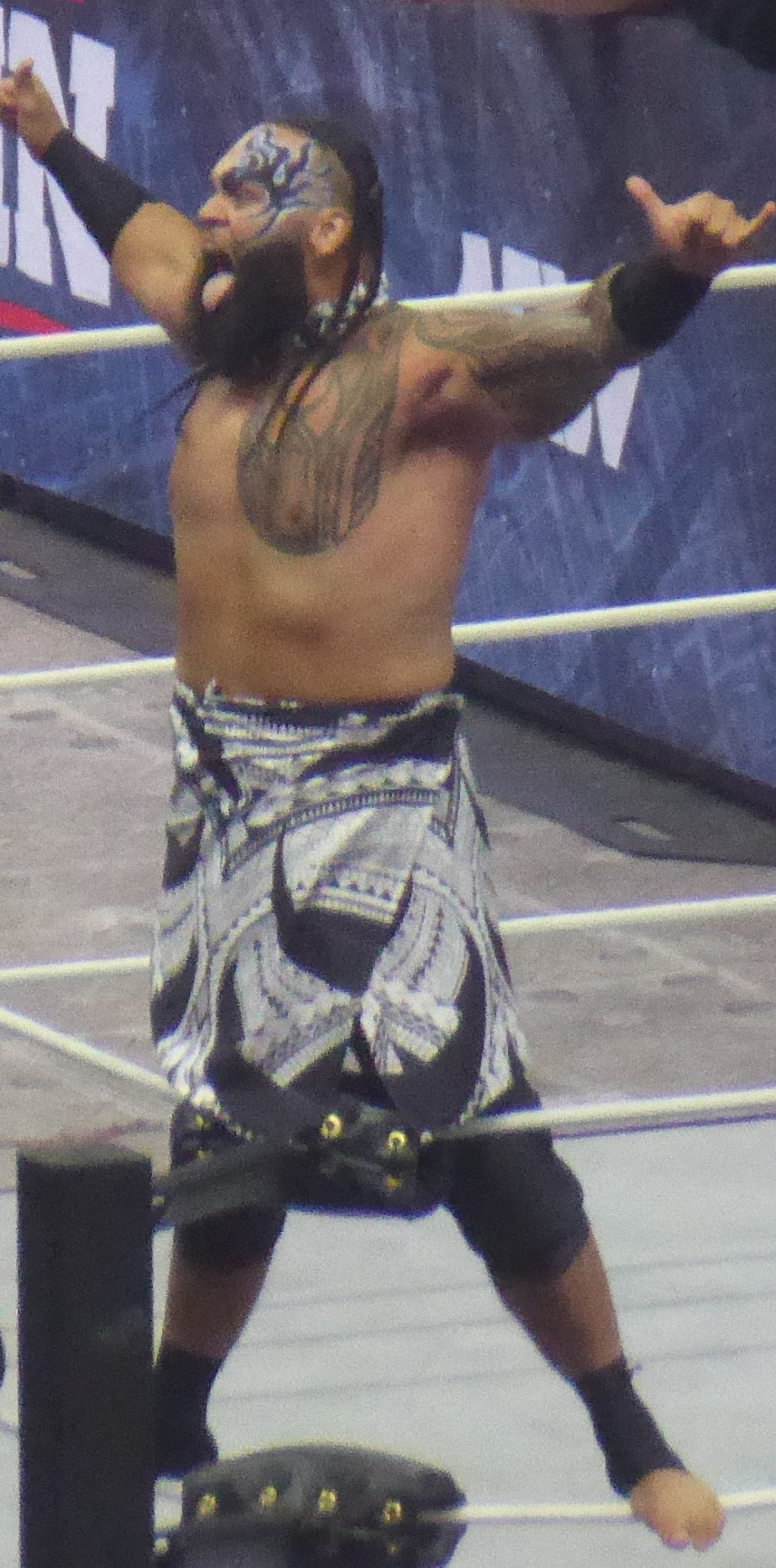
- Toa Liona in August 2024

Personal information
- Born: Bruce Orlando Leaupepe; January 30, 1991 (age 35) San Jose, California, U.S.
- Education: San Diego State University

Professional wrestling career
- Ring name: Toa Liona
- Billed height: 6 ft 4 in (193 cm)
- Billed weight: 301 lb (137 kg)
- Billed from: Samoa
- Trained by: Rikishi
- Debut: 2020

Bruce Orlando Leaupepe (born January 30, 1991) is an American professional wrestler. He is signed to All Elite Wrestling (AEW), where he performs under the ring name Toa Liona. He is one-half of Gates of Agony (GOA) alongside Bishop Kaun as members of The Demand stable. He is a former AEW World Trios Champion (with stablemates Ricochet and Bishop Kaun). He also wrestles for AEW's sister promotion, Ring of Honor (ROH), where he is a former two-time ROH World Six-Man Tag Team Champion.

== Early life ==
Leaupepe was born in San Jose, California. He attended Oak Grove High School, where he played football and basketball. After graduating in 2009, he attended the City College of San Francisco and De Anza College. In 2011, he enrolled in San Diego State University, majoring in criminal justice. He played football for the San Diego State Aztecs until being forced to quit after suffering a popped disc in his lower back. He worked as a personal trainer before deciding to become a professional wrestler.

== Professional wrestling career ==
=== Early career (2020–2021) ===
Liona was trained to wrestle by Rikishi. He began wrestling on the independent circuit in 2020, wrestling primarily for promotions in Los Angeles, California and Las Vegas, Nevada. In early-2021, he formed a tag team with Juicy Finau named "Toko Uso".

=== All Elite Wrestling / Ring of Honor (2021–present) ===
==== Early appearances (2021–2022) ====
On October 23, 2021, Liona made his All Elite Wrestling debut on AEW Dark: Elevation, teaming with Mike Reed in a loss to FTR. On October 24, he appeared on AEW Dark teaming with Bison XL, losing to 2point0.

==== Gates of Agony / GOA (2022–present) ====
Liona (right) with Bishop Kaun in August 2026

On April 1, 2022, Liona was named as one of Tully Blanchard's new clients, teaming with Kaun to form the Gates of Agony. The team defeated Shinobi Shadow Squad (Cheeseburger and Eli Isom) at the event. On May 25, Liona teamed with Juicy Finau in a GCW Tag Team Championship match, losing to BUSSY.

On July 6, Gates of Agony made their AEW Television debut on AEW Rampage, defeating Jonathan Gresham and Lee Moriarty. On July 23, 2022, at Death Before Dishonor, Prince Nana announced he had purchased Tully Blanchard Enterprises and reformed The Embassy, with Cage, Kaun and Liona. They would go on to defeat the team of Alex Zayne, Blake Christian and Tony Deppen during the preshow. At Final Battle, The Embassy defeated Dalton Castle and The Boys, to win the ROH World Six-Man Tag Team Championship.

Gates of Agony suffered a loss to FTR at Battle of the Belts IV when they challenged for the ROH World Tag Team Championship. At Rampage:Grand Slam, The Embassy lost the ROH World Six-Man Tag Team Championships to The Elite members "Hangman" Adam Page and The Young Bucks. On November 1, 2023, on AEW Dynamite, The Embassy regained the titles.

On the May 8, 2024 episode of Dynamite, Cage and the Gates of Agony turned on Swerve Strickland, disbanding the Mogul Embassy in the process. On the May 25 episode of Rampage, Gates of Agony and Cage revealed their new team name to be "Cage of Agony". After Cage left the group, Kaun and Liona were left as a tag team.

In the summer of 2025, Gates of Agony would align themselves with Ricochet and shortened their name to GOA. On August 24 at Forbidden Door, GOA and Ricochet defeated JetSpeed and Michael Oku. Later in the show GOA and Ricochet attacked The Hurt Syndicate (Bobby Lashley and Shelton Benjamin) during their AEW World Tag Team Championship defense, causing them to lose their titles. Later that month, GOA and Ricochet unsuccessfully challenged The Opps for the AEW World Trios Championship after Benjamin and Lashley's stablemate MVP interfered. At All Out on September 20, GOA and Ricochet (now known as "The Demand") defeated The Hurt Syndicate, but were defeated in a rematch at Dynamite: Title Tuesday on October 7 in a Street Fight and on October 12 at WrestleDream in a tornado trios match.

On the July 29, 2026, episode of Dynamite, The Demand defeated The Conglomeration (Orange Cassidy, Roderick Strong, and Kyle O'Reilly) to win the AEW World Trios Championship. Their reign would only last a week as they would lose the titles to Adam Page and Brodido (Brody King and Bandido) on August 5 at Grand Slam Mexico.

=== New Japan Pro-Wrestling (2023; 2026) ===
On November 13, 2023, it was announced that Gates of Agony (Liona and Kaun), would make their New Japan Pro-Wrestling (NJPW) debut, by competing in the 2023 World Tag League. The duo were announced to be competing in the A-Block. On November 29, Gates of Agony would seemingly join House of Torture, but would reveal it to be a trick on the following December 1 show. The duo finished with 4 points and were unable to qualify for the semi-finals. On February 27, 2026 at The New Beginning USA, GOA unsuccessfully challenged Knock Out Brothers for the IWGP Tag Team Championship.

== Personal life ==
Liona is of Samoan and Puerto Rican descent.

== Championships and accomplishments ==
- All Elite Wrestling
  - AEW World Trios Championship (1 time) – with Ricochet and Bishop Kaun
- Future Stars of Wrestling
  - FSW Tag Team Championship (1 time) – with Juicy Finau
- KnokX Pro Entertainment
  - Urban Empire Championship (1 time)
- Ring of Honor
  - ROH World Six-Man Tag Team Championship (2 times) – with Brian Cage and Kaun
