= Forbidden Door (2025) =

All Elite Wrestling and New Japan Pro-Wrestling pay-per-view event

- Promotional poster featuring various AEW and NJPW wrestlers
- Promotion(s): All Elite Wrestling; New Japan Pro-Wrestling
- Date: August 24, 2025
- City: London, England
- Venue: The O2 Arena
- Attendance: 18,992
- Buy rate: 126,000

Event chronology
← Previous; AEW: All In: Texas; NJPW: G1 Climax 35	Next → AEW: All Out; NJPW: Destruction in Kobe

Forbidden Door chronology
← Previous; 2024	Next → 2026

AEW in the United Kingdom chronology
← Previous; All In	Next → All In

The 2025 Forbidden Door, also promoted as Forbidden Door: London, was a professional wrestling pay-per-view (PPV) event and supershow co-produced by American promotion All Elite Wrestling (AEW) and Japan-based New Japan Pro-Wrestling (NJPW). It was the fourth annual Forbidden Door event and took place on August 24, 2025, at The O2 Arena in London, England, during the United Kingdom's August Bank Holiday weekend, which traditionally hosts AEW's All In at London's Wembley Stadium. (Note: Due to Wembley Stadium being booked out during the 2025 August Bank Holiday weekend, the 2025 All In was instead held in July at Globe Life Field in Arlington, Texas, United States, but with the 2026 event returning to its traditional scheduling at Wembley during the August Bank Holiday weekend.)

This was the first Forbidden Door held outside North America and the first to take place in August, after the first three events which took place in June. Forbidden Door featured wrestlers from NJPW's sister promotion World Wonder Ring Stardom, Mexican partner promotion Consejo Mundial de Lucha Libre (CMLL), and British partner promotion Revolution Pro Wrestling (RevPro). The event broke the attendance record for a professional wrestling event at the O2 Arena, with an announced attendance of 18,992.

Thirteen matches took place on the card, including four on the Zero-Hour pre-show. In the main event, Darby Allin, Hiroshi Tanahashi, Will Ospreay, and Golden Lovers (Kenny Omega and Kota Ibushi) defeated Gabe Kidd, Death Riders (Jon Moxley and Claudio Castagnoli), and The Young Bucks (Matt Jackson and Nick Jackson) in a Lights Out Steel Cage match. In other prominent matches, "Hangman" Adam Page defeated MJF to retain the AEW World Championship, Zack Sabre Jr. defeated Nigel McGuiness to retain the IWGP World Heavyweight Championship, "Timeless" Toni Storm defeated Athena to retain the AEW Women's World Championship, and Kazuchika Okada defeated Swerve Strickland to retain the AEW Unified Championship. The event was also notable for the returns of Jamie Hayter and Wardlow.

== Production ==
=== Background ===
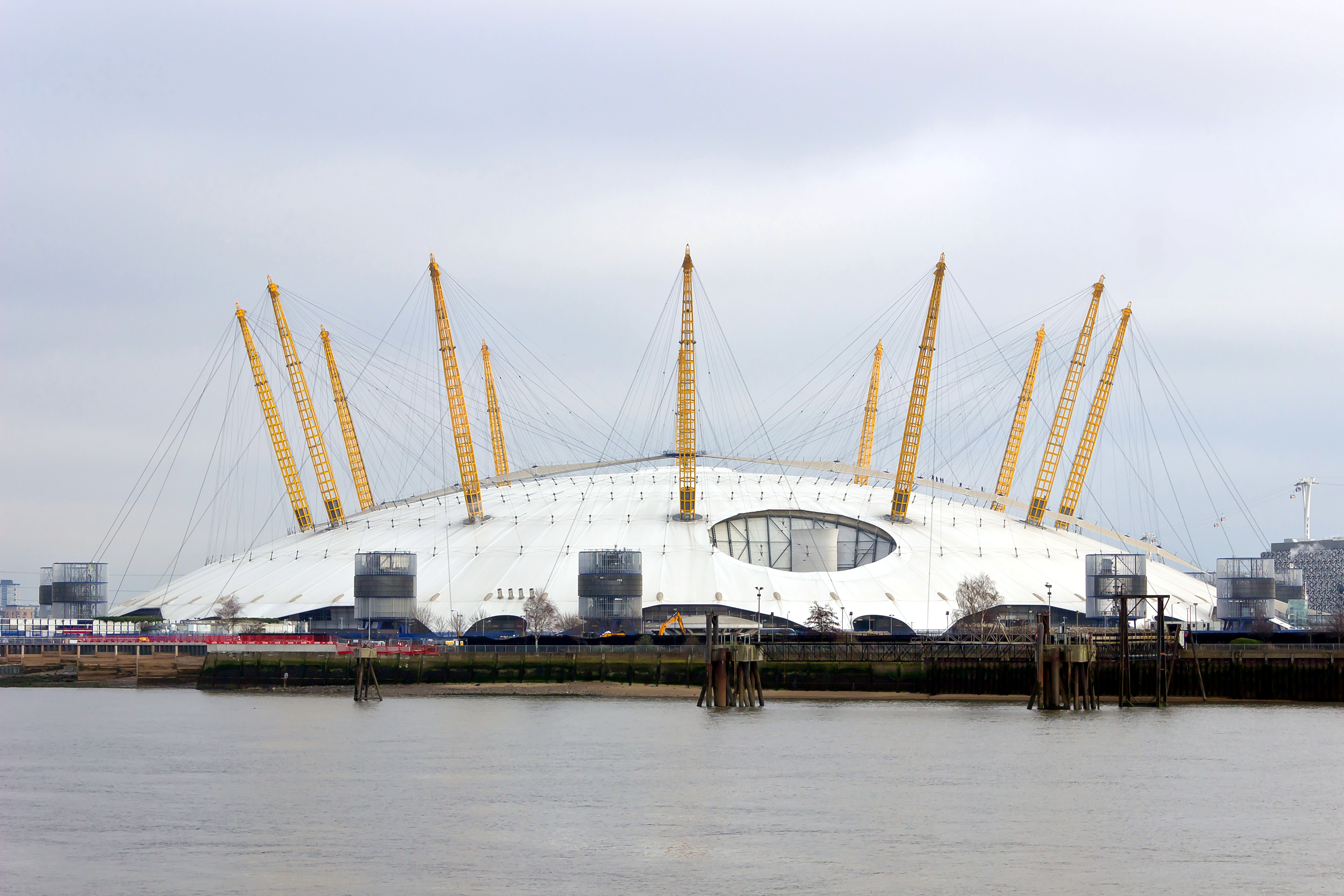
The event was held at The O2 Arena in London, England.

Forbidden Door is an annual professional wrestling pay-per-view (PPV) event co-produced by the American promotion All Elite Wrestling (AEW) and Japan-based New Japan Pro-Wrestling (NJPW). Established in 2022, the event is held during the northern hemisphere summer and features direct competition between wrestlers from the two companies. Wrestlers from NJPW's sister promotion World Wonder Ring Stardom and Mexico's Consejo Mundial de Lucha Libre (CMLL) also became involved beginning with the 2024 event. The event takes its name from the same term often used by AEW when referring to working with other professional wrestling promotions.

In August 2024, advertisements outside Wembley Stadium in London, England were shown days before AEW's All In event, which was held at the venue on August 25, advertising that the 2025 Forbidden Door would emanate from London. During All In's Zero Hour pre-show, the 2025 Forbidden Door was confirmed to be held in London on August 24, 2025. This marked the first Forbidden Door event held outside of North America, and AEW's fifth event overall outside the continent. This also marked the first Forbidden Door held in August, as the prior three events were held in June, with the event in turn held during the United Kingdom's August Bank Holiday weekend, which traditionally hosted AEW's All In at Wembley the prior two years (Wembley was booked in 2025 but with All In returning to the venue during the holiday weekend in 2026). On April 15, 2025, the venue was confirmed as The O2 Arena with tickets going on sale on May 2. In addition, it was announced that a double taping of Dynamite and Collision would take place at the OVO Hydro in Glasgow, Scotland on August 20.

Immediately following the August 23 episode of Collision, TNT and HBO Max simulcast Countdown to Forbidden Door, a special preview of the event. On August 24, the pay-per-view aired at a special start time of 6:00 p.m. British Summer Time (1:00 p.m. Eastern Daylight Time), preceded by the Zero Hour pre-show at 4:30 p.m. BST (11:30 a.m. EDT). Forbidden Door was available on Prime Video in the United States, Canada, and the United Kingdom. It was also offered via traditional cable and satellite providers, as well as PPV.com and YouTube in the United States and Canada. Select international markets could access it through PPV.com, Triller TV, and YouTube. In Australia, the event aired on Main Event. The event was also shown at all Dave & Buster's and Tom’s Watch Bar locations across the United States.

=== Storylines ===
Other on-screen personnel
Role	Name
Commentators	Excalibur (Pre-show and PPV)
Commentators	Tony Schiavone (PPV)
Commentators	Bryan Danielson (PPV)
Commentators	Ian Riccaboni (Pre-show)
Commentators	Walker Stewart (TNT and IWGP Championship Matches)
Commentators	Don Callis (TNT and Unified Championship Matches)
Commentators	Jim Ross (Unified Championship and Lights Out Steel Cage Match)
Japanese commentators	Haruo Murata
Japanese commentators	Miki Motoi
Japanese commentators	El Desperado
Ring announcers	Justin Roberts (PPV)
Ring announcers	Arkady Aura (Pre-show)
Ring announcers	Takuro Shibata (Pre-show and PPV)
Referees	Aubrey Edwards
Referees	Bryce Remsburg
Referees	Mike Posey
Referees	Paul Turner
Referees	Rick Knox
Referees	Stephon Smith
Backstage interviewer	Lexy Nair
Pre-show hosts	Renee Paquette
Pre-show hosts	RJ City
Pre-show hosts	Jeff Jarrett
Pre-show hosts	Madison Rayne

Forbidden Door featured 13 professional wrestling matches that involved different wrestlers from pre-existing scripted feuds and storylines. Storylines were produced on AEW's weekly television programs, Dynamite and Collision, as well as NJPW, Stardom, and CMLL events.

On May 31, it was announced that Hiroshi Tanahashi would wrestle at the event, in what would be his final match in the United Kingdom. On the August 13 episode of Dynamite, Jon Moxley and his Death Riders stablemates (Claudio Castagnoli, Wheeler Yuta, and Marina Shafir) attacked Moxley's opponent after his match, resulting in Darby Allin (the Death Riders' nemesis who had been feuding with the stable since the 2024 WrestleDream) making the save. Allin would be outnumbered before a returning Will Ospreay, who had his own issues with the Death Riders saved him. Ospreay would subsequently issue a challenge for a Lights Out Steel Cage match at Forbidden Door between the Death Riders' team and his team. Later in the show, it was revealed that Tanahashi was added to Ospreay's team. As a result of Tanahashi's inclusion, Moxley would add The Young Bucks (Matt Jackson and Nick Jackson), associates of the Death Riders, to his team. The full lineups would later be revealed, with it being Moxley, Castagnoli, The Young Bucks, and Gabe Kidd, another associate of the Death Riders, against Allin, Ospreay, Tanahashi, and Golden Lovers (Kota Ibushi, and Kenny Omega), with Omega having his own issues with both the Death Riders and The Young Bucks.

During the July 23 episode of Dynamite, it was announced that an eliminator tournament would be held to determine who would challenge The Hurt Syndicate (Bobby Lashley and Shelton Benjamin) for the AEW World Tag Team Championship at Forbidden Door. On the August 20 episode of Dynamite, the tournament final between Brodido (Brody King and Bandido) and FTR (Cash Wheeler and Dax Harwood) ended in a 30-minute time limit draw. Therefore, both teams advance, making it a three-way tag team match at Forbidden Door.

At All In: Texas, Swerve Strickland teamed with Will Ospreay and defeated The Young Bucks (Matthew Jackson and Nicholas Jackson). As a result of the loss, The Young Bucks were stripped of their Executive Vice President titles. Also at All In: Texas, Kazuchika Okada defeated Kenny Omega to win the inaugural AEW Unified Championship. On the July 16 episode of Dynamite, Okada, who was a member of The Elite with The Young Bucks, called out Strickland for causing his stablemates' downfall. On the July 31 episode of Collision, Strickland challenged Okada to a title match at Forbidden Door, which Okada accepted.

At All In: Texas, Athena won the women's Casino Gauntlet match to earn a contract for an AEW Women's World Championship match at any time. On the July 31 episode of Collision, she signed her contract to challenge the champion, "Timeless" Toni Storm, at Forbidden Door. Athena stated that Storm had bad luck in London, including losing the title at All In: London in 2024.

On August 4, AEW announced a four-way qualifying match for the AEW TBS Championship between Alex Windsor, Billie Starkz, Queen Aminata, and Skye Blue for the August 6 episode of Dynamite. Windsor won the match to represent AEW and challenge the champion, Mercedes Moné, at Forbidden Door. The title match would also feature one representative each from Consejo Mundial de Lucha Libre (CMLL) and World Wonder Ring Stardom. On August 13, during CMLL Informa 587, it was announced that Persephone would be the CMLL representative. On August 20, Bozilla announced that she would be the Stardom representative.

During the August 9 episode of Collision, AEW announced a four-way match between Daniel Garcia, Hechicero, Lee Moriarty, and Nigel McGuinness for the August 16 episode of Collision. McGuinness won the "Technical Spectacle" by submission earning the opportunity challenge Zack Sabre Jr. for the IWGP World Heavyweight Championship at Forbidden Door.

On the August 9 episode of Collision, Kyle Fletcher defeated Tomohiro Ishii to retain the AEW TNT Championship. After the match, Fletcher challenged New Japan Pro-Wrestling (NJPW) to send their best to face him at Forbidden Door. On the August 13 episode of Dynamite, NJPW's Hiromu Takahashi made a surprise appearance as the mystery partner for Ishii's team in an eight-man tag team match against Fletcher's team. Takahashi pinned Fletcher's Don Callis Family stablemate Josh Alexander, leading to the official announcement of a title match between Fletcher and Takahashi at Forbidden Door.

At Revolution in March, "Hangman" Adam Page defeated MJF. At All In: Texas, Page won the AEW World Championship, while MJF won the men's Casino Gauntlet match to earn a contract for an AEW World Championship match at any time. On the August 13 episode of Dynamite, Page goaded MJF into executing his championship match for Forbidden Door, and the title match between Page and MJF was made official. On the August 20 episode of Dynamite, MJF, along with Ricochet and Gates of Agony (Bishop Kaun and Toa Liona) kidnapped Mark Briscoe. MJF threatened Page that he would burn Briscoe unless their match stipulated that the title can change hands via countout or disqualification and that MJF's Casino Gauntlet contract would not be used. Page agreed to the stipulations for their match.

After The Patriarchy (Christian Cage and Nick Wayne) lost their AEW World Tag Team Championship match at All In: Texas, Nick turned on Cage, the team leader and his "father", and hit him with the Killswitch. He was then joined by stablemates Kip Sabian and Mother Wayne in the post-match beatdown. With help from FTR (Cash Wheeler and Dax Harwood), they set up Cage for a con-chair-to, but just as Nick was about to hit him, Adam Copeland made a surprise return and rescued his longtime friend-turned-tag team partner-turned-enemy, Cage. After clearing the ring, Copeland told Cage to "go find yourself". Copeland would begin a feud with FTR, who turned on him at Dynasty after they lost their AEW World Trios Championship match. On the August 13 episode of Dynamite, Copeland made his in-ring return facing FTR's manager Stokely, with the stipulation that if FTR interfered in the match, their restraining order against Copeland would be lifted. Copeland won by disqualification after Stokely threw powder in Copeland's face. As FTR and Stokely began a post-match assault soon to be joined by Sabian and Nick, Cage ran down and saved Copeland from the assault before embracing in the ring. Later in the show, it was announced that Copeland and Cage would be teaming up for the first time since 2011 to face Sabian and Nick at Forbidden Door. On the August 20 episode of Dynamite, Nick revealed that he would not be able to compete due to a broken foot. He would be replaced by Killswitch, who made a surprise return after being sidelined since 2024 due to pneumonia in both lungs.

=== Aftermath ===
In the media scrum after that show, AEW president Tony Khan announced that any future matches guaranteed by the Casino Gauntlet contract would require a one week of advance notice.

== Results ==
No.	Results	Stipulations	Times
1^{P}	El Desperado, Yuya Uemura, and Paragon (Roderick Strong and Kyle O'Reilly) defeated CRU (Action Andretti and Lio Rush) and The Don Callis Family (Hechicero and Josh Alexander) (with Lance Archer and Rocky Romero) by pinfall	Eight-man tag team match	12:05
2^{P}	Ricochet and GOA (Bishop Kaun and Toa Liona) defeated Michael Oku and JetSpeed ("Speedball" Mike Bailey and Kevin Knight) (with Amira Blair) by pinfall	Trios match	9:55
3^{P}	Megan Bayne and Triangle of Madness (Julia Hart, Skye Blue, and Thekla) (with Penelope Ford) defeated Harley Cameron, Kris Statlander, Queen Aminata, and Willow Nightingale by pinfall	Eight-woman tag team match	11:15
4^{P}	The Opps (Samoa Joe, Katsuyori Shibata, and Powerhouse Hobbs) (c) defeated Bullet Club War Dogs (Drilla Moloney, Clark Connors, and Robbie X) (with Gedo) by pinfall	Trios match for the AEW World Trios Championship	7:20
5	Adam Copeland and Christian Cage defeated Killswitch and Kip Sabian (with Mother Wayne) by pinfall	Tag team match	13:45
6	Kyle Fletcher (c) (with Don Callis and Lance Archer) defeated Hiromu Takahashi by pinfall	Singles match for the AEW TNT Championship	14:40
7	Mercedes Moné (c) defeated Alex Windsor, Bozilla, and Persephone by pinfall	Four-way match for the AEW TBS Championship	15:30
8	Zack Sabre Jr. (c) defeated Nigel McGuinness (with Daniel Garcia) by pinfall	Singles match for the IWGP World Heavyweight Championship	17:00
9	Brodido (Brody King and Bandido) defeated The Hurt Syndicate (Bobby Lashley and Shelton Benjamin) (c) and FTR (Cash Wheeler and Dax Harwood) (with Stokely) by pinfall	Three-way tag team match for the AEW World Tag Team Championship	15:30
10	Kazuchika Okada (c) (with Don Callis) defeated Swerve Strickland by pinfall	Singles match for the AEW Unified Championship	16:30
11	"Timeless" Toni Storm (c) defeated Athena (with Billie Starkz) by submission	Singles match for the AEW Women's World Championship; This was Athena's Casino Gauntlet championship contract match.	15:15
12	"Hangman" Adam Page (c) defeated MJF by pinfall	Singles match for the AEW World Championship; Had Page been counted out or disqualified, he would have lost the title.	31:40
13	Will Ospreay, Hiroshi Tanahashi, Darby Allin, and Golden☆Lovers (Kenny Omega and Kota Ibushi) defeated Gabe Kidd, Death Riders (Jon Moxley and Claudio Castagnoli), and The Young Bucks (Matt Jackson and Nick Jackson) (with Marina Shafir and Wheeler Yuta) by pinfall	Lights Out Steel Cage match	32:30
(c) / – the champion(s) heading into the match; P / – the match was broadcast on the pre-show

=== AEW World Tag Team Championship Eliminator Tournament ===
Quarterfinals; Dynamite (July 23 and 30, 2025); Collision (July 26 and 31, 2025)
FTR (Cash Wheeler and Dax Harwood)	Pin
JetSpeed (Kevin Knight and "Speedball" Mike Bailey)	17:03
Bang Bang Gang (Austin Gunn and Juice Robinson)	Pin
Big Bill and Bryan Keith	12:25
The Outrunners (Truth Magnum and Turbo Floyd)	14:00
The Young Bucks (Matt Jackson and Nick Jackson)	Pin
Gates of Agony (Bishop Kaun and Toa Liona)	12:31
Brodido (Brody King and Bandido)	Pin

Semifinals; Collision (July 31, 2025); Dynamite (August 6, 2025)
FTR	Pin
Bang Bang Gang	15:14
The Young Bucks	20:54
Brodido	Pin

Final; Dynamite; August 20, 2025
FTR	Draw
Brodido	30:00

== See also ==
- Global Wars UK
- List of All Elite Wrestling pay-per-view events
- List of major NJPW events – List of pay-per-views produced by New Japan Pro-Wrestling
