= Cheeseburger (wrestler) =

American professional wrestler

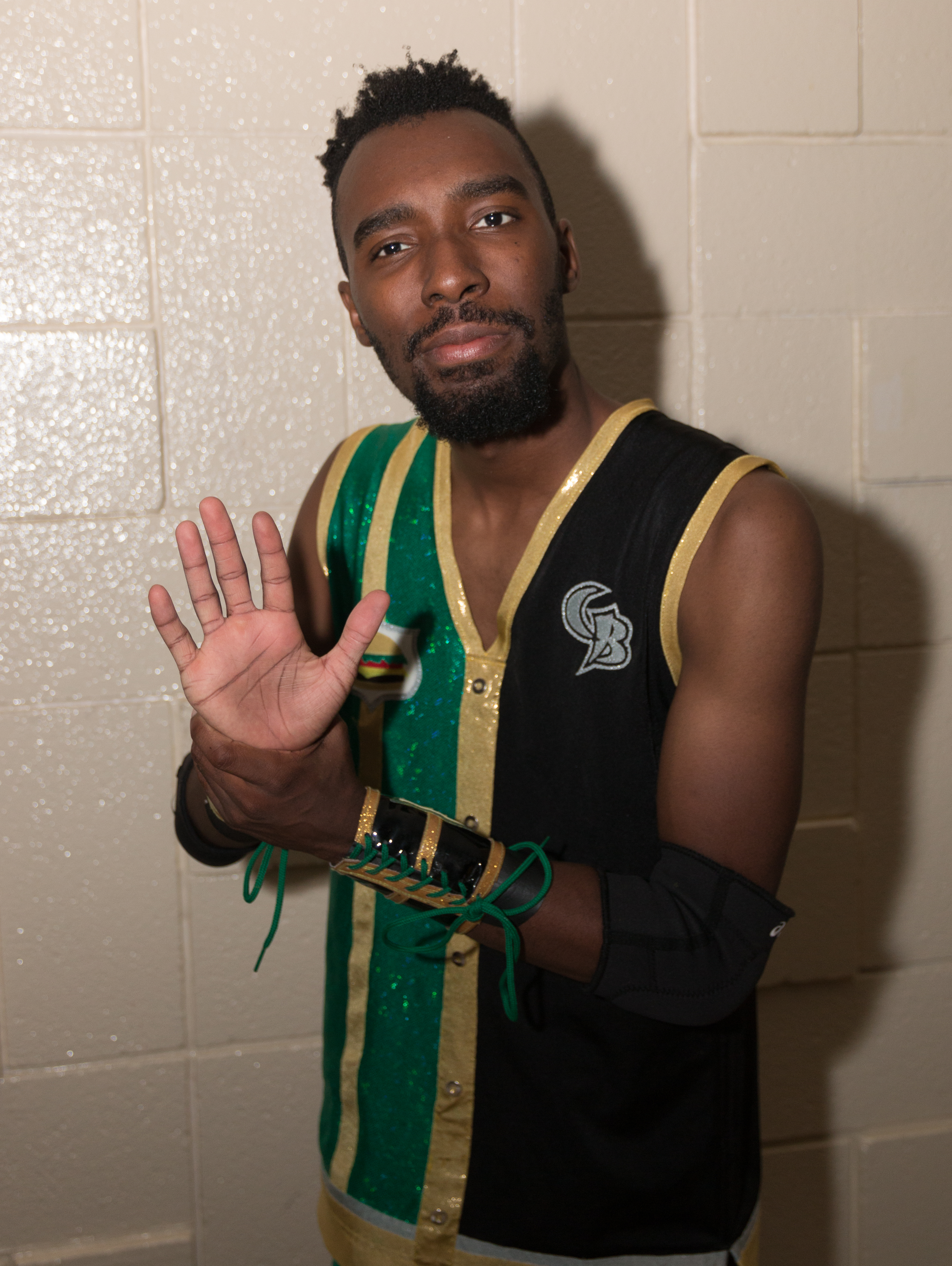
- World Famous CB posing in July 2016

Personal information
- Born: Brandel Littlejohn Trenton, New Jersey, U.S.

Professional wrestling career
- Ring name(s): World Famous CB; Cheeseburger; Leech Landa
- Billed height: 5 ft 8 in (1.73 m)
- Billed weight: 136 lb (62 kg)
- Trained by: Daizee Haze; Delirious; Lance Storm; Les Thatcher; Mike Quackenbush; Tom Prichard
- Debut: April 5, 2012

Brandel Littlejohn, better known by his ring name World Famous CB (formerly Cheeseburger), is an American professional wrestler. He is best known for his appearances with Ring of Honor (ROH). Despite mostly being used as a jobber due to his small stature, he is a perennial fan favorite among ROH fans.

== Early life ==
Littlejohn grew up in Trenton, New Jersey, and attended Trenton Catholic Academy in nearby Hamilton Township, where his interest in sports was limited to some basketball. He studied digital film at Mercer County Community College.

== Professional wrestling career ==
=== Early career (2012–2013) ===
Littlejohn began wrestling with the promotion Beyond Wrestling, where he competed as Leech Landa in a match in Philadelphia in September 2012. In 2013, he appeared in two matches with the promotion Wrestling Is...Respect! in Boonton, New Jersey.

=== Ring of Honor (2013–present) ===
Littlejohn debuted in Ring of Honor on July 11, 2013, at the promotion's A Night of Hoopla event in Chicago. Wrestling as Cheeseburger, he teamed with Roderick Strong to challenge reDRagon (Bobby Fish and Kyle O'Reilly) for the ROH World Tag Team Championship, unsuccessfully. The kayfabe reason for his ring name came from when he was bullied in a segment by Charlie Haas, but it was a name he acquired three years earlier, following a remark from Rhett Titus.

In 2014, Cheeseburger twice unsuccessfully challenged Jay Lethal for the ROH World Television Championship: at the promotion's Second to None event in Baltimore and its Road to Best in the World '14 show in Carbondale, Illinois.

Cheeseburger was a part of a tag team called Brutal Burgers, teaming with "Brutal" Bob Evans. The two wrestlers feuded after the tag team split, culminating in the Final Battle kickoff, where Cheeseburger defeated Evans.

In January 2016, Cheeseburger made another challenge to the World Television Championship, this time falling short against Roderick Strong in Collinsville, Illinois during ROH's Winter Warriors Tour.

During the COVID Pandemic, Littlejohn thought about his career and his character, and seeing the Cheeseburger character as stagnant, so he decided to change his gimmick. The week of Monday, February 1, 2021, Littlejohn announced on Twitter that he would no longer be using the "Cheeseburger" ring-name. It was revealed on ROH TV the following Friday, February 5 that he will now use the ringname "World Famous CB".

During 2022, following Tony Khan's purchase of Ring of Honor, Littlejohn continued to appear at pay-per-view's, including a loss to the Gates of Agony during the Supercard of Honor XV Pre-show, a loss to The Trust Busters during the Death Before Dishonor pre-show, and a loss to Angelo Parker & Matt Menard at Final Battle where he teamed with Eli Isom.

=== New Japan Pro-Wrestling (2016–2018) ===
On January 4, 2016, Cheeseburger made his surprise debut for New Japan Pro-Wrestling (NJPW) by taking part in the New Japan Rumble in the pre-show of Wrestle Kingdom 10 in Tokyo Dome. He was eliminated from the match by Yoshi-Hashi. Cheeseburger formed an on-screen friendship with NJPW wrestler Jushin Liger, which led to him adopting Liger's Shotei palm strike as a finishing move.

Cheeseburger returned to NJPW on January 4, 2017, again taking part in the New Japan Rumble on the pre-show of Wrestle Kingdom 11 in Tokyo Dome. During the match, Cheeseburger scored an elimination over Bone Soldier and lasted until the end of the match, before being the final man eliminated by Michael Elgin. The following day, Cheeseburger teamed up with Hiro Saito, Hiroyoshi Tenzan, Satoshi Kojima and Scott Norton in a ten-man tag team, where they defeated Bullet Club (Bad Luck Fale, Bone Soldier, Kenny Omega, Tama Tonga and Tanga Loa).

At Wrestle Kingdom 12 in Tokyo Dome on January 4, 2018, Cheeseburger once again was the last competitor eliminated from the New Japan Rumble. He was pinned by Masahito Kakihara to end the match. At New Year Dash !! the next night, he teamed with Roppongi 3K in a losing effort against Kenny Omega and The Young Bucks.

== Championships and accomplishments ==
- Beyond Wrestling
  - Feast Championship Wrestling Championship (1 time, inaugural)
- Immortal Championship Wrestling
  - ICW Dippin Donuts 24/7 Championship (1 time)
- Labor of Love
  - Labor of Love Citywide Championship (1 time, inaugural)
  - Labor Of Love Citywide Title Tournament (2023)
- Flying V Fights: Pro Wrestling
  - Technical Difficulties II Tournament (2024)
- Pro Wrestling Illustrated
  - Ranked No. 360 of the top 500 singles wrestlers in the PWI 500 in 2021
- WrestlePro
  - WrestlePro Alaska Last Frontier Championship (1 time, current)
  - WrestlePro Alaska Tag Team Championship (1 time, inaugural) – with LSG
- Other Titles
  - BBW CRAB Heavyweight Championship (1 time)
  - TAW Cruiser Championship (1 time, current)
