= Eli Isom =

American professional wrestler

Personal information
- Born: Rensselaer, Indiana, U.S.

Professional wrestling career
- Ring name: Eli Isom
- Billed height: 5 ft 11 in (180 cm)
- Trained by: ROH Dojo
- Debut: 2017

Eli Isom is an American professional wrestler. currently performs on the independent circuit. He is best known for his time in American promotion Ring of Honor (ROH), where he is a member of the Shinobi Shadow Squad alongside Cheeseburger.

== Early life ==
Eli Isom always loved watching professional wrestling growing up and he loved nothing more than watching it with his mom.

== Professional wrestling career ==
=== Ring of Honor (2017–2022) ===
Isom made his debut on November 12, 2017, losing to Shane Taylor at Ring of Honor.

On December 10, 2022, Isom and Cheeseburger were defeated by Angelo Parker and Matt Menard during the Final Battle pre-show.

=== All Elite Wrestling (2022) ===
On April 27, 2022, Isom made his AEW debut on Dark: Elevation. He made his AEW Dynamite debut on September 28, losing to Ricky Starks.

== Personal life ==
During year 2016 Eli Isom's mom tragically died in a car accident.

== Championships and accomplishments ==
- Pro Wrestling Illustrated
  - Ranked No. 463 of the top 500 singles wrestlers in the PWI 500 in 2021
