= José the Assistant =

American professional wrestler and manager

Personal information
- Born: José Garcia East Los Angeles, California, United States

Professional wrestling career
- Ring name(s): Andy Tovarez; José Vargas; Orion; Principe Orion; José the Assistant
- Billed height: 6 ft 0 in (183 cm)
- Billed weight: 189 lb (86 kg)
- Billed from: Los Angeles, California
- Trained by: Ultimo Guerrero; Super Boy; Chilango; Inoki Dojo; Durango Kid; Kendo Kashin
- Debut: 2007

José García is an American professional wrestler and manager, best known for his time with All Elite Wrestling (AEW), where he performed under the ring name José the Assistant and also managed Andrade El Ídolo and La Facción Ingobernable (Rush, Dralístico and Preston Vance).

== Professional wrestling career ==
José García began wrestling for various independent promotions around California and Mexico, mainly competing under the ring names Orion and Principe Orion. García also made appearances for World Wrestling Entertainment first on August 18, 2011 episode of WWE Superstars, wrestling under the name Jose Vargas in a loss to Brodus Clay. García's next, and last, appearance for WWE was on the August 20, 2012 episode of Raw, where he teamed with Mike Spinner in a losing effort to Ryback.

After a hiatus from in-ring competition that began in September 2018, García began making appearances for All Elite Wrestling (AEW) in 2021 under the name José the Assistant as the manager for La Faccion Ingobernable (Andrade El Idolo, Dralístico, Preston Vance, and Rush). On April 1, 2024, García was released from his AEW contract.
