= Bishop Kaun =

American professional wrestler (born 1990)

Kaun
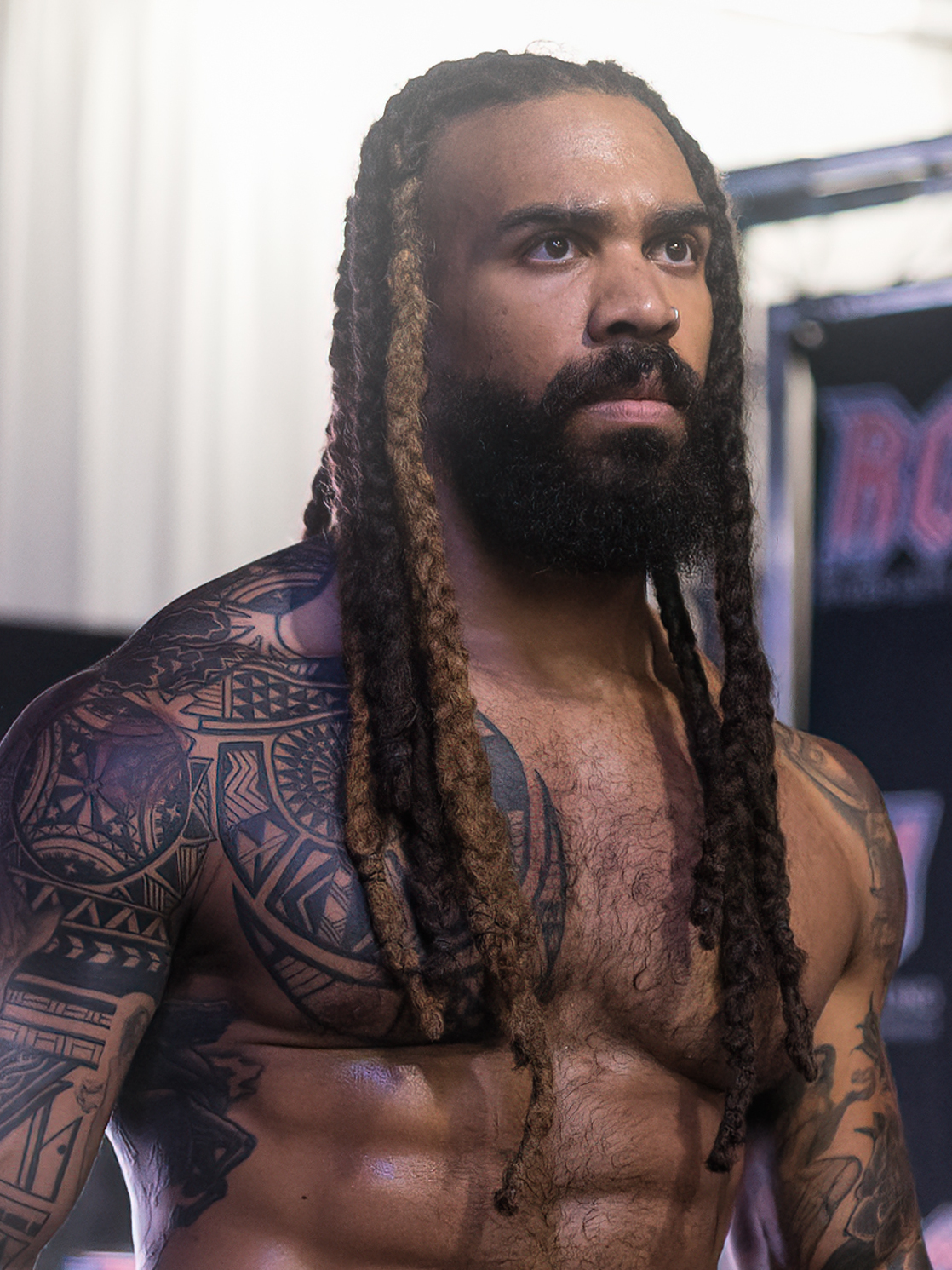
- Kaun in September 2021

Personal information
- Born: Jasper Kange; March 2, 1990 (age 36) Minneapolis, Minnesota, U.S.
- Education: Luther College

Professional wrestling career
- Ring name(s): Bishop Kaun; Bishop Khan; Jasper Kaun; Kaun
- Billed height: 6 ft 0 in (183 cm)
- Billed weight: 237 lb (108 kg)
- Billed from: Minneapolis, Minnesota, U.S.
- Trained by: R.J. Meyer; Joey Mercury
- Debut: 2017

Jasper Kange is an American professional wrestler, better known by the ring name Bishop Kaun or Kaun. He is signed to All Elite Wrestling (AEW) and its sister promotion Ring of Honor (ROH), where he is one-half of Gates of Agony (GOA) alongside Toa Liona as members of The Demand stable. He is a former AEW World Trios Champion (with stablemates Ricochet and Toa Liona).

== Early life ==
Kange attended the University of Minnesota before transferring to Luther College, where he majored in art and played football for the Luther Norse. After graduating, he worked in art and design before deciding to become a professional wrestler after moving to Baltimore.

== Professional wrestling career ==
=== Early career (2017–2018) ===
Kaun was trained at the Maryland Championship Wrestling professional wrestling school, debuting in 2017. He spent the early years of his career primarily wrestling for Maryland Championship Wrestling, where he won the MCW Tag Team Championship with Malcolm Moses.

=== Ring of Honor / All Elite Wrestling (2018–present) ===
==== Shane Taylor Promotions (2018–2021) ====
Kaun debuted in Ring of Honor (ROH) in 2018, teaming with Moses as the Soldiers of Savagery. In 2021, he and Moses formed the stable Shane Taylor Promotions with Shane Taylor. In February 2021, the trio defeated MexiSquad to win the ROH World Six-Man Tag Team Championship. They held the title until Final Battle in December 2021 when they lost to the Righteous.

==== Gates of Agony / GOA (2022–present) ====
Kaun (left) and Toa Liona in August 2026

Following Final Battle, ROH was put on hiatus until April 2022 by new owner Tony Khan. In December 2021, Kaun began also wrestling for ROH's sister promotion All Elite Wrestling. On April 1, 2022, on Supercard of Honor XV, Tully Blanchard announced that Kaun would be part of his Tully Blanchard Enterprises stable, alongside Toa Liona and Brian Cage. The duo of Kaun and Liona were named the "Gates of Agony".

In July 2022 at Death Before Dishonor, Prince Nana announced he had purchased Tully Blanchard Enterprises and reformed The Embassy, with Cage, Kaun and Liona. At Battle of the Belts IV in October 2022, Kaun and Liona unsuccessfully challenged FTR for the ROH World Tag Team Championship. At Final Battle in December 2022, the Gates of Agony defeated Dalton Castle and The Boys to win the ROH World Six-Man Tag Team Championship. At Rampage: Grand Slam in September 2023, the Gates of Agony lost the ROH World Six-Man Tag Team Championship to The Elite. On November 1, 2023 on AEW Dynamite, the Gates of Agony regained the titles from The Elite. On the January 17, 2024 episode of Dynamite, they lost the ROH World Six-Man Tag Team Championship to Bullet Club Gold. On the May 8 episode of Dynamite, Cage and the Gates of Agony turned on Swerve Strickland, disbanding the Mogul Embassy in the process.

On the May 25 episode of Rampage, Gates of Agony and Cage revealed their new team name to be "Cage of Agony". After Cage left the group, Kaun and Liona were left as a tag team. On April 16 at Dynamite: Spring BreakThru, Gates of Agony unsuccessfully challenged The Hurt Syndicate for the AEW World Tag Team Championship. In the summer, Gates of Agony would align themselves with Ricochet and shortened their name to GOA. On August 24 at Forbidden Door, GOA and Ricochet defeated JetSpeed and Michael Oku. Later in the show GOA and Ricochet attacked The Hurt Syndicate (Bobby Lashley and Shelton Benjamin) during their AEW World Tag Team Championship defense, causing them to lose their titles. Later that month, GOA and Ricochet unsuccessfully challenged The Opps for the AEW World Trios Championship after Benjamin and Lashley's stablemate MVP interfered. At All Out on September 20, GOA and Ricochet (now known as "The Demand") defeated The Hurt Syndicate, but were defeated in a rematch at Dynamite: Title Tuesday on October 7 in a Street Fight and on October 12 at WrestleDream in a tornado trios match.

On the July 29, 2026, episode of Dynamite, The Demand defeated The Conglomeration (Orange Cassidy, Roderick Strong, and Kyle O'Reilly) to win the AEW World Trios Championship. Their reign would only last a week as they would lose the titles to Adam Page and Brodido (Brody King and Bandido) on August 5 at Grand Slam Mexico.

=== New Japan Pro-Wrestling (2023; 2026) ===
On November 13, 2023, it was announced that Gates of Agony (Liona and Kaun), would make their New Japan Pro-Wrestling (NJPW) debut, by competing in the 2023 World Tag League. The duo were announced to be competing in the A-Block. On November 29, Gates of Agony would seemingly join House of Torture, but would reveal it to be a trick on the December 1 show. The duo finished with four points and were unable to qualify for the semi-finals. On February 27, 2026 at The New Beginning USA, GOA unsuccessfully challenged Knock Out Brothers for the IWGP Tag Team Championship.

== Personal life ==
Kaun is of Cameroonian descent on his father's side.

== Championships and accomplishments ==
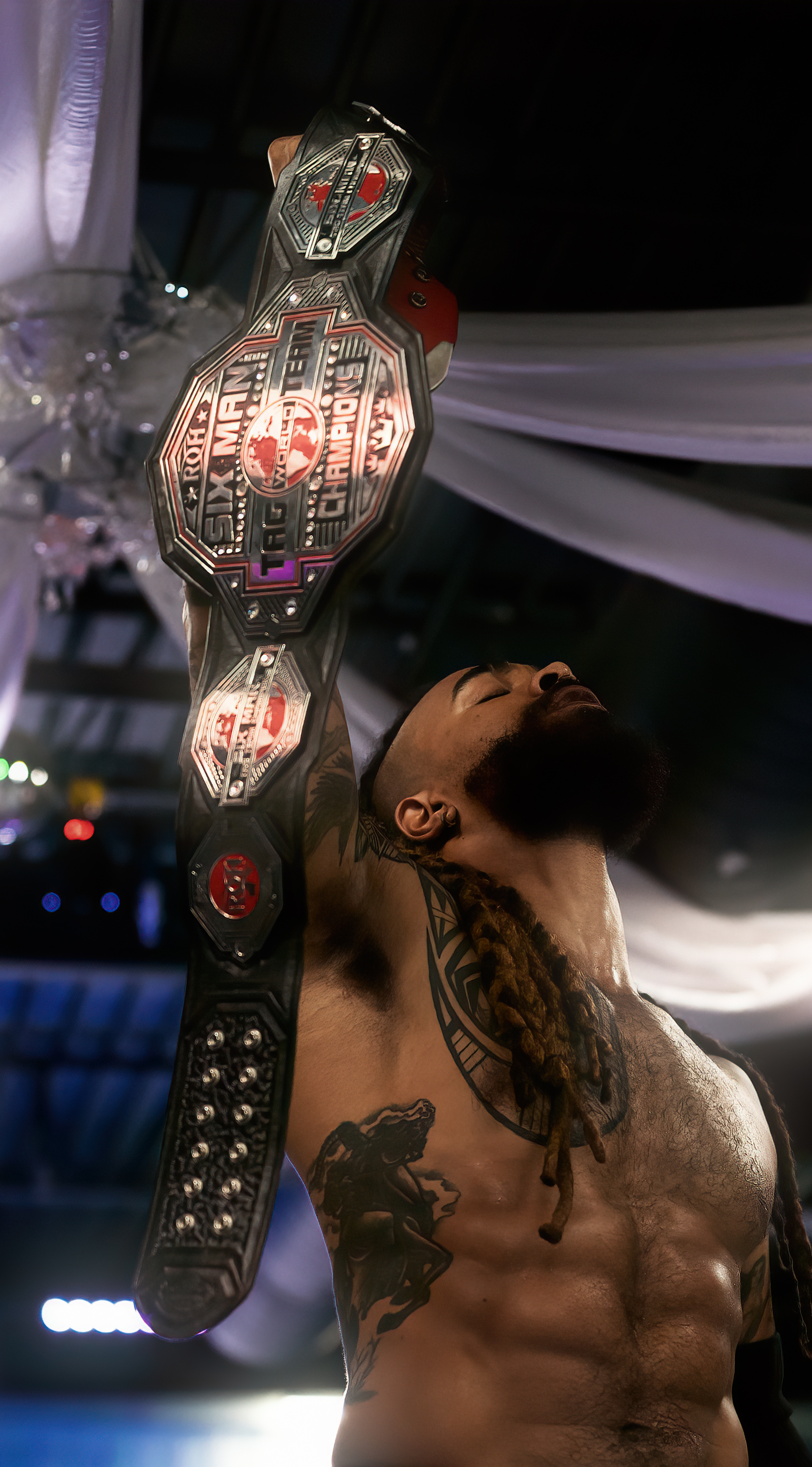
Kaun as the ROH World Six-Man Tag Team Champion in July 2021.

- All Elite Wrestling
  - AEW World Trios Championship (1 time) – with Ricochet and Toa Liona
- ASÉ
  - Pan Afrikan World Diaspora Championship (1 time)
- Galactic Pro Wrestling
  - GPW Heavyweight Championship (1 time)
- Maryland Championship Wrestling
  - MCW Heavyweight Championship (1 time)
  - MCW Tag Team Championship (1 time) – with Malcolm Moses
  - Bruiser Strong Rumble (2024)
- Pro Wrestling Illustrated
  - Ranked No. 399 of the top 500 singles wrestlers in the PWI 500 in 2023
- Puro Pinche Wrestling
  - PPW Heavyweight Championship (1 time)
- Ring of Honor
  - ROH World Six-Man Tag Team Championship (3 times) – with Moses and Shane Taylor (1) and Brian Cage and Toa Liona (2)
- River City Wrestling
  - RCW Championship (1 time)
