= Mogul Embassy =

Professional wrestling stable

Stable
- Leader(s): Prince Nana; Swerve Strickland
- Members: See members
- Name(s): Embassy; Mogul Embassy
- Debut: 2004
- Disbanded: May 8, 2024
- Years active: 2004–2006; 2009–2012; 2014; 2016–2017; 2022–2024

Mogul Embassy, formerly simply the Embassy, was a villainous professional wrestling stable. Formed by Prince Nana in Ring of Honor (ROH) in 2004, in 2022 the Embassy also began appearing with All Elite Wrestling (AEW). In 2023, the Embassy merged with Swerve Strickland's Mogul Affiliates stable to become Mogul Embassy. Mogul Embassy disbanded in May 2024 when its members turned on Strickland, ending the stable's run.

== History ==
=== Ring of Honor (2004–2006, 2009–2012, 2014–2016) ===
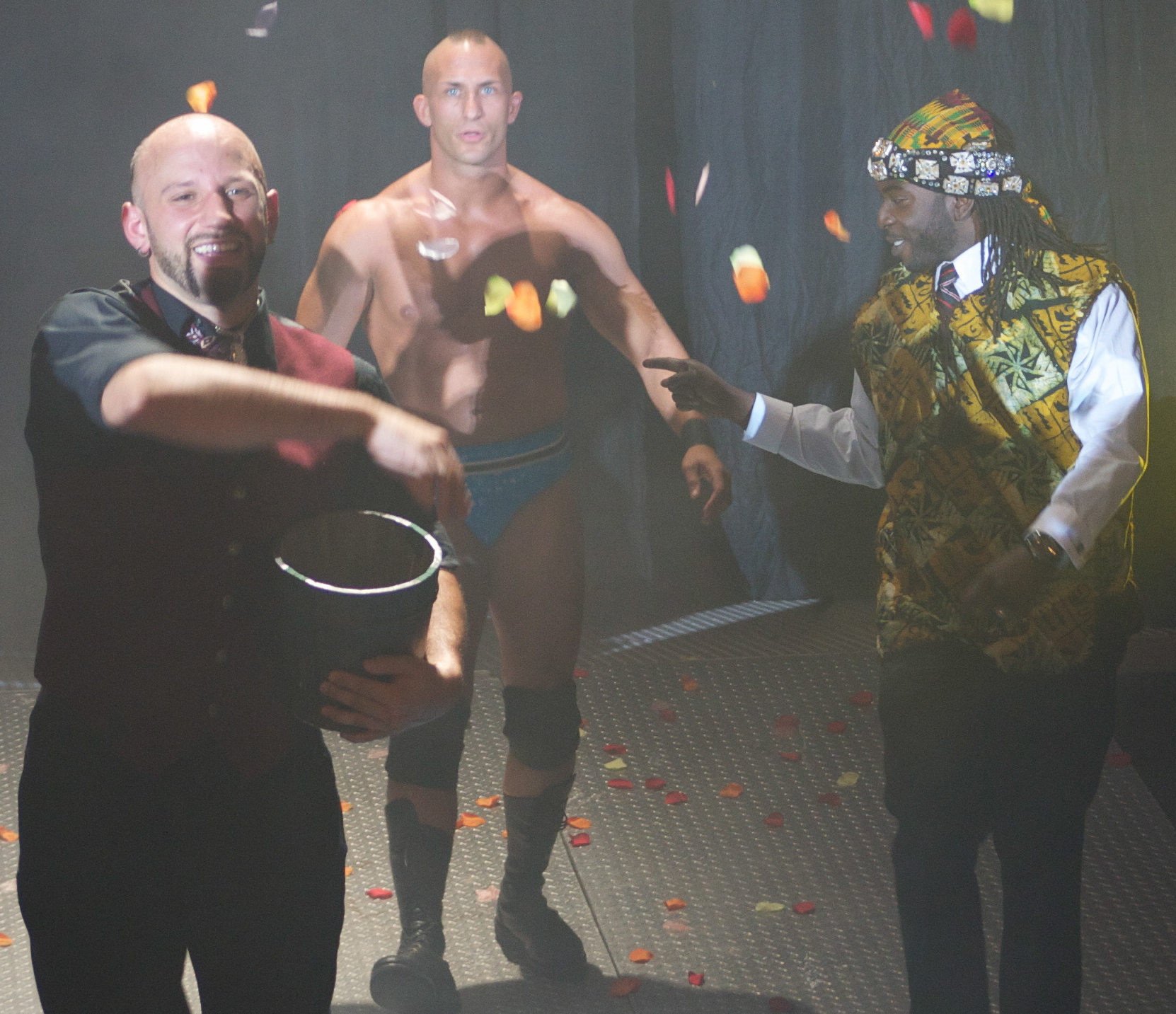
The Embassy - Ernie Osiris, Tommaso Ciampa, and Prince Nana - in Ring of Honor in 2011

The Embassy was formed in Ring of Honor (ROH) in 2004 by Prince Nana, who portrayed a wealthy African prince who used his fortune to employ wrestlers to compete on his behalf. Jimmy Rave became Nana's principal wrestler and was dubbed the "Crown Jewel of the Embassy", with Alex Shelley and Abyss later joining the group.

The Embassy became involved in a prolonged rivalry with Generation Next throughout 2005. The feud included several multi-man matches between the two factions, culminating in a Steel Cage Warfare match in December 2005, where Generation Next defeated The Embassy.

In January 2006, Rave, Shelley and Abyss won the ROH Trios Tournament, defeating Generation Next in the final. The victory earned the three members championship opportunities of their choosing. Rave subsequently challenged Bryan Danielson for the ROH World Championship but was unsuccessful. Later that year, Sal Rinauro joined Rave in The Embassy's tag team division after Shelley departed ROH. Nana announced his departure from ROH in September 2006, effectively ending the original incarnation of The Embassy.

Nana returned to ROH in October 2008, initially portraying himself as a disgraced former prince who had lost his wealth and was seeking employment. After several appearances in which he was removed from the arena by security, Nana revealed in 2009 that he had regained his fortune and had been directing attacks on ROH wrestlers through Bison Smith. On March 20, 2009, Nana officially reformed The Embassy with Smith and Ernie Osiris, with Jimmy Rave returning to the group the following day.

The second incarnation subsequently expanded to include wrestlers such as Claudio Castagnoli, Joey Ryan, Erick Stevens, Shawn Daivari and Necro Butcher. By late 2010, most of these members had departed the group.

In January 2011, Nana introduced another incarnation of The Embassy, consisting of Ernie Osiris, Mia Yim, R.D. Evans and Tommaso Ciampa. Ciampa became Nana's principal wrestler, taking over the role previously occupied by Rave. Ciampa went on to become one of the group's most prominent members, including winning the 2012 ROH March Mayhem Tournament.

The Embassy's final major ROH storyline of this period centered on Ciampa's pursuit of the ROH World Television Championship. After Nana's interference cost Ciampa an opportunity at the championship, Ciampa turned on Nana in June 2012 and left The Embassy, ending the group's latest incarnation.

Nana later formed another version of The Embassy in 2014, this time alongside Moose, Stokely Hathaway and Veda Scott. The group was subsequently disbanded. Nana later managed Donovan Dijak before leaving ROH in 2016.

=== Independent circuit (2019) ===
In 2019, Nana briefly revived The Embassy on the independent circuit with former members Jimmy Rave and Sal Rinauro. The trio competed in Chikara's King of Trios tournament.

=== All Elite Wrestling / Return to ROH (2022–2024) ===
On July 23, 2022, at Death Before Dishonor, Nana returned to ROH and announced that he had purchased Tully Blanchard Enterprises. He subsequently reformed The Embassy with Brian Cage, Jonathan Gresham and Gates of Agony (Bishop Kaun and Toa Liona). Gresham was later removed from the group following his departure from ROH. In December 2022, Cage and Gates of Agony defeated Dalton Castle and The Boys at Final Battle to win the ROH World Six-Man Tag Team Championship. The victory marked the first championship won by an incarnation of The Embassy.

On the April 7, 2023, episode of Rampage, Swerve Strickland joined the faction after he announced he was merging his own faction "Mogul Affiliates" with them. The group was then renamed "Mogul Embassy". On the July 26, 2023 episode of Dynamite, AR Fox joined the faction after helping Strickland defeat Darby Allin, but he was fired from the stable on August 23, 2023. On the Rampage edition of Grand Slam. Mogul Embassy lost the ROH World Six-Man Tag Team Championships to The Elite ("Hangman" Adam Page and The Young Bucks (Matt Jackson and Nick Jackson). On the November 1, 2023, episode of Dynamite, Mogul Embassy defeated The Elite to become the ROH World Six-Man Tag Team Champions for the second time. On November 13, 2023, it was announced that Gates of Agony (Liona and Kaun), would make their New Japan Pro-Wrestling (NJPW) debut, by competing in the 2023 World Tag League. The duo were announced to be competing in the A-Block. On November 29, Gates of Agony would seemingly join House of Torture, but would reveal it to be a trick on the following December 1st show. The duo finished with 4 points and were unable to qualify for the semi-finals.

On the January 17, 2024 episode of Dynamite, Mogul Embassy lost the ROH World Six-Man Tag Team Championships to Bullet Club Gold (Jay White and The Gunns (Austin Gunn and Colten Gunn)). On April 21 at Dynasty, Strickland defeated Samoa Joe to win the AEW World Championship. This victory marked several firsts for the stable, including first singles championship and first PPV main event. Accordingly, in anticipation; before the match, Prince Nana adorned Swerve Strickland with the "Crown Jewel" robes established by his first client Jimmy Rave. On the May 8 episode of Dynamite, Brian Cage, Bishop Kaun, and Toa Liona turned on Strickland, disbanding Mogul Embassy in the process. Afterwards, Nana and Strickland remained aligned without the Mogul Embassy banner, while Cage, Kaun, and Liona subsequently formed a new stable called Cage of Agony.

== Members ==
*	Founding member
I	Leader of the Embassy
II	Leader of Mogul Embassy
M	Manager

=== Former ===
Member		Joined	Left
Abyss		August 11, 2005	January 28, 2006
Alex Shelley		July 23, 2005	June 24, 2006
AR Fox		July 26, 2023	August 23, 2023
Bison Smith		March 20, 2009	July 28, 2011
Bishop Kaun		July 23, 2022	May 8, 2024
Brian Cage		July 23, 2022	May 8, 2024
Claudio Castagnoli		March 10, 2009	October 2010
Daizee Haze		November 5, 2005	September 2006
Diablo Santiago		May 15, 2004	July 8, 2005
Erick Stevens		November 6, 2009	October 2010
Ernesto Osiris		March 10, 2009	July 28, 2011
Fast Eddie Vegas		February 25, 2005	July 23, 2005
Jade Chung		April 2, 2005	October 1, 2005
Jimmy Rave		July 17, 2004; March 21, 2009	October 28, 2006; September 2009
Joey Ryan		May 9, 2009	February 13, 2010
John Walters		December 26, 2004	March 5, 2005
Jonathan Gresham		July 8, 2022	July 23, 2022
Josh Daniels		May 15, 2004	May 22, 2004
Mike Kruel		April 2, 2005	July 23, 2005
Necro Butcher		May 21, 2010	October 2, 2011
Oman Tortuga		May 15, 2004	July 8, 2005
Prince Nana	*I/M	December 27, 2003	May 8, 2024
R.D. Evans		January 22, 2011	July 28, 2011
Rhino		June 13, 2011	April 2012
Sal Rinauro		July 15, 2006	October 28, 2006
Shawn Daivari		March 6, 2010	October 2010
Swerve Strickland	II	April 7, 2023	May 8, 2024
Toa Liona		July 23, 2022	May 8, 2024
Tommaso Ciampa		January 22, 2011	July 28, 2011
Xavier	*	December 27, 2003	April 2004

=== Part-time ===
Member	Tenure
Adam Pearce	February 11, 2006
Angel Williams	November 5, 2004
Barry Ace	May 15, 2004
Conrad Kennedy III	June 24, 2006
Dave Taylor	April 2, 2011
Excess 69	June 16, 2005
Moose	December 7, 2014
Petey Williams	June 18, 2005
Puma	August 20, 2005
Ricky Morton	October 2, 2004
Spanky	August 27, 2005
Ramon	December 7, 2014
Vanessa Harding	February 25, 2005
Veda Scott	December 7, 2014
Weapon of Masked Destruction	December 4, 2004
Weapon of Masked Destruction #2	December 26, 2004
Weapon of Masked Destruction #3	March 5, 2005

== Sub-groups ==
=== Former ===
Affiliate	Members	Tenure	Type	Promotion(s)
Outcast Killaz	Diablo Santiago; Oman Tortuga	2004–2005	Tag team	ROH
Gates of Agony	Bishop Kaun; Toa Liona	2022–2024	Tag team	ROH; AEW; NJPW

== Championships and accomplishments ==
- All Elite Wrestling
  - AEW World Championship (1 time) – Swerve Strickland
- Ring of Honor
  - ROH World Six-Man Tag Team Championship (2 times) – Brian Cage and Gates of Agony (Kaun and Toa Liona)
  - Trios Tournament winner (2006) – Abyss, Alex Shelley, and Jimmy Rave

== See also ==
- Cage of Agony
