= AEW Dark: Elevation =

Professional wrestling streaming television program

- AEW Dark: Elevation logo
- Genre: Professional wrestling
- Created by: Tony Khan
- Starring: AEW roster and independent wrestlers
- Country of origin: United States
- Original language: English
- No. of seasons: 1
- No. of episodes: 112 (list of episodes)

Production
- Camera setup: Multicamera setup
- Running time: 90–120 minutes
- Production company: All Elite Wrestling

Original release
- Network: YouTube
- Release: March 15, 2021 – April 24, 2023

Related
- AEW Dynamite; AEW Collision; AEW Rampage; AEW Battle of the Belts; AEW Dark; Ring of Honor Wrestling

AEW Dark: Elevation, also known as Dark: Elevation or simply Elevation, is an American professional wrestling streaming television program that was produced by the American promotion All Elite Wrestling (AEW), running from March 15, 2021, to April 24, 2023, on AEW's YouTube channel. The program was a spinoff of Dark that featured matches taped before and after the preceding episode of AEW's flagship program, Dynamite, with a focus on up and rising talent on the AEW roster, as well as wrestlers from the independent circuit. Both Dark and Elevation were canceled due to the addition of AEW's television program, Collision.

== History ==
On October 2, 2019, All Elite Wrestling's (AEW) flagship professional wrestling television program, Dynamite, premiered on TNT. During the event, there were four dark matches, two before and two after the live broadcast. A program entitled Dark, which began airing on AEW's YouTube channel on Tuesday, October 8, would showcase these dark matches. Unlike the dark matches of other wrestling promotions, which generally do not affect storylines, the matches featured on Dark were part of AEW's storylines and counted towards the wrestlers' match statistics.

On February 24, 2021, AEW announced that a spinoff of Dark would premiere on Monday, March 15 titled AEW Dark: Elevation. The promotion's third weekly program, it was announced that it would stream on Monday nights at 7pm Eastern Time on AEW's YouTube channel. It was also announced that Elevation would feature the promotion's established and rising stars, as well as top wrestlers from the independent circuit. Like Dark, matches on the new program maintained storyline continuity and match statistics with AEW's other programming. Wrestling veteran Paul Wight, formerly known as the Big Show in WWE, was announced to be doing commentary for Elevation alongside Tony Schiavone after Wight was signed. This was later changed to be Matt Menard. With the premiere of Rampage on August 13, 2021, AEW President and Chief Executive Officer Tony Khan said that Dynamite and Rampage would be AEW's core properties, while their YouTube shows, Dark and Elevation, would be their peripheral properties, essentially their developmental shows.

Elevation aired its last episode on April 24, 2023. Both it and Dark were canceled in preparation for the addition of AEW's television program, Collision, which premiered on TNT in June 2023. This was due to an amended deal with AEW's broadcast partner Warner Bros. Discovery (WBD), in which all of AEW's programs would air exclusively on WBD's channels. It was also reported that Rampage would begin showcasing younger wrestlers, essentially becoming what Dark and Elevation were for the company.

In an interview with Iridian Fierro in July 2025, Khan stated that he was open to bringing back Dark and/or Elevation, but it would have to align with AEW's media strategy and television partnerships. He also said it would have to make sense to bring either back, but the ultimate decision was with WBD.
