= Final Battle 2011 =

Professional wrestling event

- Promotional poster featuring ROH World Champion Davey Richards and challenger Eddie Edwards
- Promotion: Ring of Honor
- Date: December 23, 2011
- City: New York, New York
- Venue: Hammerstein Ballroom
- Attendance: 1,500
- Tagline: There can only be one alpha in the pack.

Pay-per-view chronology
← Previous; Death Before Dishonor IX	Next → 10th Anniversary Show: Young Wolves Rising

Final Battle chronology
← Previous; 2010	Next → 2012

Final Battle 2011 was a professional wrestling pay-per-view (PPV) event produced by Ring of Honor (ROH). It took place on December 23, 2011 at the Manhattan Center in New York City. It was the tenth annual event in the Final Battle chronology, with the first taking place in 2002, but only the third to be broadcast live.

All three Ring of Honor (ROH) championships were contested at the event. The ROH World Championship was defended in a rubber match between champion Davey Richards and former champion Eddie Edwards; Edwards lost their previous match in June 2011 but won their first encounter in March 2010. The ROH World Tag Team Championship was defended by Wrestling's Greatest Tag Team, consisting of Shelton Benjamin and Charlie Haas, against the six-time champions The Briscoe Brothers, Jay and Mark. The final championship match saw Jay Lethal defend his ROH World Television Championship against former champion El Generico and Mike Bennett in an elimination match. Also featured on the card was the wrestling return of Kevin Steen, after a year-long absence from the promotion. Four other matches make up the undercard.

== Production ==
=== Background ===
Final Battle was originally scheduled to take place on December 17, 2011, in the Grand Ballroom of the Manhattan Center in New York City, and tickets went on sale on September 17. The event was later postponed to December 23 and moved to the Hammerstein Ballroom within the Manhattan Center. As with all ROH's pay-per-views since 2009, the broadcast was live and over the internet.

=== Storylines ===
Other on-screen personnel
Commentators	Nigel McGuinness
Commentators	Kevin Kelly

Final Battle featured professional wrestling matches that involved different wrestlers from existing, scripted feuds and storylines. Wrestlers portrayed villains or heroes, or more ambiguous characters in scripted contests that built tension and culminated in a wrestling match on the pay-per-view.

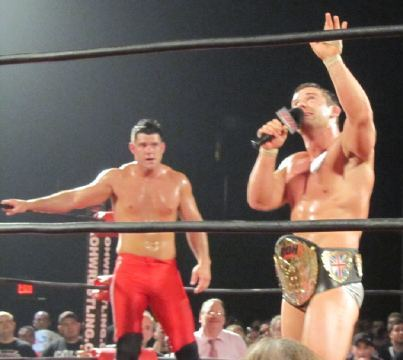
Davey Richards (right) after winning the ROH World Championship from Eddie Edwards; the two competed again for the championship in their third singles match

The main event was for the ROH World Championship and saw Davey Richards defend against his American Wolves tag team partner, Eddie Edwards in their third singles match as opponents. In March 2010, the two met in the final of tournament to crown the inaugural ROH World Television Champion. Edwards won the match, leading to them both seeking more of a singles career and Richards began competing for the World Championship. In November, Edwards won the Survival of the Fittest tournament, which gave him the right to challenge World Champion Roderick Strong, which he successfully did at Manhattan Mayhem IV in March 2011. On the back of a nine match winning streak in singles competition, Richards was announced as the challenger for Edwards' title at the Best in the World 2011 iPPV in June. Richards won the match and became ROH World Champion.

The following month Edwards saved Richards from a handicap beatdown at the hands of the House of Truth, but at the next event in a tag team match between the American Wolves and Richards' training students Adam Cole and Kyle O'Reilly, Edwards continually stomped on the head of O'Reilly after the match had ended because the timekeeper's bell had not been rung. Edwards went on to defeat both House of Truth members and O'Reilly in singles matches over the next few months and on the 29 October episode of Ring of Honor Wrestling was announced as the challenger for the World Championship. Edwards announced that to give him an edge, he had employed a new trainer ahead of the title opportunity. On the 12 November episode of Ring of Honor Wrestling the American Wolves wrestled the House of Truth (Strong and Michael Elgin), during which Edwards helped the team win with a dragon sleeper despite never having used the move before. This is a signature move of Dan Severn who was later revealed as Edwards' new trainer, despite Richards having previously sought his mentorship.

The ROH World Tag Team Championship match saw Wrestling's Greatest Tag Team (Charlie Haas and Shelton Benjamin) defend their championship against the Briscoe Brothers, Jay and Mark. At ROH's June pay-per-view, Best in the World 2011, Wrestling's Greatest Tag Team defended their championship in a four-team elimination match, outlasting all three other teams including the Briscoes. At the end of the match however, the Briscoes returned and assaulted the winners with chairs. On the October 1 episode of Ring of Honor Wrestling, Wrestling's Greatest Tag Team expressed their desire to face the Briscoes for revenge and stated they would put their championship on the line if need be. ROH authority figure Jim Cornette denied them their wish, explaining that he did not want to reward the Briscoes for their recklessness. He did however, give them the chance to earn their contendership in a match against the All-Night Express (Rhett Titus & Kenny King). During the match, Jay Briscoe low-blowed King and pinned him. Cornette overruled the decision, saying that regardless of it being accidental or not, he could not award the team a Tag Team Championship match. He rebooked the match for a fortnight later, which the Briscoes then won.

The final title match of the event was for the ROH World Television Championship. On the October 1 episode of Ring of Honor Wrestling, El Generico defended the championship against Jay Lethal in a match that lasted the 15 minute time limit without a winner. Authority figure Jim Cornette hastily allowed for the rest of television time to be used if both competitors agreed, which led to Lethal becoming the new champion. He made his first defence on the October 22 episode against "The Prodigy" Mike Bennett which also went to a 15-minute time limit draw, though Bennett later claimed he had mounted Lethal and attacked him enough that Lethal had been knocked out and thus should have lost the match even though Lethal then reversed the mount to see out the remaining seconds; in the event, Bennett refused to continue past the time limit and began to proclaim himself the true champion. During Lethal's second defence, against Generico, Bennett came to ring side and during the match started posing with the championship belt. While the referee was distracted, trying to keep Bennett under control, Lethal had made a long pin on Generico that went unnoticed just before the time limit again expired. Amidst a brawl between Lethal and Bennett, Generico dived out of the ring on top of them. A week later, ROH announced an elimination three-way dance between the trio to decide the rightful champion. Bennet petitioned to have the match not officiated by referee Todd Sinclair, who he blamed for not awarding him the victory via referee stoppage during his draw with Lethal.

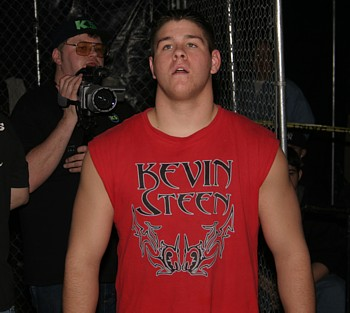
Kevin Steen wrestled his first ROH match in a year, since Final Battle 2010, after a long storyline with Steve Corino

The most featured non-title contest was a grudge match between Kevin Steen and Steve Corino. Two years previously at Final Battle 2009, Steen attacked his tag team partner of two years – El Generico – and became a crazed villainous character. Steve Corino, in Japan at the time, released a YouTube video which revealed himself as the reason for Steen's change in character as he believed Steen could achieve more on his own than with Generico's comedic demeanour. Steen and Generico feuded through all of 2010, leading to a Fight Without Honor at Final Battle 2010 by which point even Corino had become concerned with Steen's mental state and actions. In the match, Steen lost to Generico which meant he was forced to leave Ring of Honor. After this, Corino set about trying to atone for his actions by adopting a character similar to a recovering addict. In the middle of 2011 he announced he would be bringing his sponsor to ROH, who was also a former ROH roster member atoning for their actions. Though most fans expected Steen, at Supercard of Honor VI Corino unveiled Jimmy Jacobs, who led The Age of the Fall to various bloody attacks in 2007 and 2008, as his sponsor.

At the Best In The World 2011 PPV Corino made another speech about reforming and introduced Kevin Steen from the crowd. Steen pretended to also atone before attacking Jacobs and then ROH's on-screen authority figure Jim Cornette. This began a long campaign of Steen trying to find his way back into ROH, appearing again at Death Before Dishonor IX and attempting to piledrive ROH's owner Carey Silkin, before being scripted to hack into the ROH forum a month later, which led to a new website under the Sinclair Broadcast Group's ownership of ROH. After weeks of fans chanting his name on Ring of Honor Wrestling, Steen eventually threatened legal action against Cornette. On the 3 December episode of Ring of Honor Wrestling, Steen met Cornette and Corino in the ring for a verbal confrontation. Cornette acquiesced to a match at Final Battle because of Steen's legal wrangling with the stipulation that if he can beat Steve Corino, he'll be reinstated as a roster member. Steen, meanwhile, demanded Cornette sit at ringside and watch so that he could gloat after his victory.

There were several other matches on the card, including Roderick Strong issuing an invitational challenge to an unnamed opponent. He has vowed to show up the main event, contending he should be competing for the World Championship. Similarly, Tommaso Ciampa of Prince Nana's Embassy faction was scheduled in a match against an unnamed opponent. However, in the December 16 video newswire it was revealed that Ciampa's opponent would be former Embassy member Jimmy Rave. Rave made a speech in the video claiming he was going to use all the knowledge that Prince Nana taught him to end Ciampa's undefeated streak.

== Reception ==
At the event itself, Jim Cornette stated that Final Battle had drawn the largest gate in ROH's history. The event was attended live in the Hammerstein Ballroom by 1,500 people. The show drew an estimated 2,000 buys on internet pay-per-view, a significant jump from the previous pay-per-view, Death By Dishonor IX. The increase was attributed to ROH returning to television in between the two pay-per-views.

== Results ==
No.	Results	Stipulations	Times
1	Michael Elgin (with Truth Martini) defeated T. J. Perkins	Singles match	07:25
2	Tommaso Ciampa (with Prince Nana and The Embassy) defeated Jimmy Rave	Singles match	08:33
3	Jay Lethal (c) defeated El Generico and Mike Bennett (with Bob Evans and Maria Kanellis)	Three-Way Dance for the ROH World Television Championship	18:17
4	Kevin Steen defeated Steve Corino	No Disqualification match with Jimmy Jacobs as the special guest referee; Since Steen won, he rejoined Ring of Honor	23:13
5	The Young Bucks (Matt Jackson and Nick Jackson) defeated Future Shock (Adam Cole and Kyle O'Reilly), Caprice Coleman and Cedric Alexander, The Bravado Brothers (Harlem and Lancelot), and The All Night Express (Rhett Titus and Kenny King)	Tag team gauntlet match for a future ROH World Tag Team Championship match	29:36
6	Roderick Strong (with Truth Martini) defeated Chris Hero	Singles match	16:37
7	The Briscoe Brothers (Jay Briscoe and Mark Briscoe) defeated Wrestling's Greatest Tag Team (Charlie Haas and Shelton Benjamin) (c)	Tag team Match for the ROH World Tag Team Championship	13:24
8	Davey Richards (with Kyle O'Reilly and Tony Kozina) (c) defeated Eddie Edwards (with Dan Severn)	Singles match for the ROH World Championship	41:21
(c) / – the champion(s) heading into the match

== See also ==
- 2011 in professional wrestling
- List of Ring of Honor pay-per-view events
