= Final Battle (2015) =

2015 Ring of Honor pay-per-view event

- Promotional poster featuring various ROH wrestlers
- Promotion: Ring of Honor
- Date: December 18, 2015 (PPV); December 19, 2015 (TV taping)
- City: Philadelphia, Pennsylvania
- Venue: 2300 Arena
- Attendance: Night 1: 1,300; Night 2: 600

Pay-per-view chronology
← Previous; Survival of the Fittest	Next → ROH 14th Anniversary Show

ROH Final Battle chronology
← Previous; 2014	Next → 2016

Final Battle was a two-night professional wrestling pay-per-view (PPV) event produced by the U.S.-based wrestling promotion Ring of Honor (ROH). It took place on December 18 and 19, 2015 at the 2300 Arena in Philadelphia, Pennsylvania. It was the 14th event under the Final Battle chronology. The first night was a pay per view broadcast, and the second night was a set of tapings for ROH's flagship TV show Ring of Honor Wrestling. It was the 2nd major professional wrestling Traditional pay per view to be broadcast live from the 2300 Arena.

In the first night, nine matches took place with one in the pre-show. In the main event, Jay Lethal defeated A.J. Styles to retain the ROH World Championship. In another prominent match of the event, Adam Cole defeated Kyle O'Reilly in a grudge match. Other matches in the undercard, Roderick Strong retained the ROH World Television Championship against Bobby Fish, War Machine defeated The Kingdom to win the ROH World Tag Team Championships, Alex Shelley, Matt Sydal and A. C. H. defeated The KRD (The Addiction (Christopher Daniels and Frankie Kazarian) and Chris Sabin), and Michael Elgin defeated Moose.

== Production ==
=== Storylines ===
Other on-screen personnel
Role	Name
Commentators	Kevin Kelly
Commentators	Mr. Wrestling 3
Commentators	Jerry Lynn
Commentators	Nigel McGuinness

Final Battle featured professional wrestling matches that involved wrestlers from pre-existing scripted feuds or storylines that play out on ROH's television program, Ring of Honor Wrestling. Wrestlers will portray heroes (faces) or villains (heels) as they follow a series of events that build tension and culminate in a wrestling match or series of matches.

On September 18, 2015, at All Star Extravaganza VII A.J. Styles defeated Roderick Strong, Michael Elgin, and Adam Cole to become the number one contender to the ROH World Championship. On November 4, 2015, ROH announced that A.J. Styles would take his championship match at Final Battle 2015 against ROH World Champion Jay Lethal.

In November, Roderick Strong issued an open challenge to the world for his ROH World Television Championship. On November 21, 2015, Bobby Fish answered the challenge, claiming his victory over Roderick Strong in Chicago on September 12, 2015, was enough for him to be number one contender. Roderick Strong accepted the challenge and purposed for it to take place at Final Battle.

On September 18, 2015, at All Star Extravaganza VII The All Night Express would return to defeat The Briscoes in an open challenge. At Glory By Honor XIV The Briscoes would tie it up with a win over King and Titus. On November 27, ROH Matchmaker Nigel McGuiness announced that it would be The Briscoes vs. The All Night Express at Final Battle 2015 for the number one contendership to the ROH World Tag Team Championship. The Young Bucks would interrupt causing Nigel McGuiness to throw them into the mix making it a three-way tag match at Final Battle to face The Kingdom or War Machine at ROH's next pay-per-view event.

At Survival of the Fittest (2015) Michael Elgin won the Survival of the Fittest tournament, earning him an ROH World Championship match. Moose who was also in the Survival of the Fittest tournament was defeated by Michael Elgin in a 3-Way Match between Elgin, Moose, and Adam Cole. Moose would be upset with Elgin causing Moose's manager Stokely Hathaway to issue a challenge to Elgin at Final Battle. Michael Elgin would accept, and Nigel McGuiness would sign for Moose vs. Michael Elgin at Final Battle 2015.

At Best in the World 2015 Dalton Castle defeated Silas Young. At All Star Extravaganza VII Silas Young defeated Dalton Castle earning Dalton Castle's boys. On December 4, it was announced that Dalton Castle would go head to head with Silas Young one more time at the Final Battle pay per view.

== Results ==
=== Night 1 (PPV) ===
No.	Results	Stipulations	Times
1^{D}	The House Of Truth (Donovan Dijak & Joey Daddiego) (with Truth Martini) defeated Local Competitor and Matt Sells	Singles match	—
2^{P}	Cheeseburger defeated Bob Evans (with Tim Hughes)	Singles match	07:28
3	The All Night Express (Rhett Titus and Kenny King) defeated The Briscoe Brothers (Jay Briscoe and Mark Briscoe) and The Young Bucks (Matt Jackson and Nick Jackson)	Three-way tag team match to determine the number one contender for the ROH World Tag Team Championship	09:15
4	Silas Young defeated Dalton Castle	Singles match	10:40
5	Michael Elgin defeated Moose (with Stokely Hathaway)	Singles match	11:47
6	Adam Cole defeated Kyle O'Reilly	Singles match	16:08
7	A. C. H., Alex Shelley and Matt Sydal defeated Chris Sabin and The Addiction (Christopher Daniels and Frankie Kazarian)	Six-man tag team match	15:38
8	Roderick Strong (c) defeated Bobby Fish	Singles match for the ROH World Television Championship	15:17
9	War Machine (Hanson and Raymond Rowe) defeated The Kingdom (Michael Bennett and Matt Taven) (c) (with Maria Kanellis)	Tag team match for the ROH World Tag Team Championship	03:10
10	Jay Lethal (c) (with Truth Martini and Taeler Hendrix) defeated A.J. Styles	Singles match for the ROH World Championship	22:09
(c) / – the champion(s) heading into the match; D / – this was a dark match; P / – the match was broadcast on the pre-show

=== Night 2 (TV Tapings) ===
No.	Results	Stipulations	Times
1	Roderick Strong defeated Stevie Richards	Singles match	10:20
2	Caprice Coleman defeated Will Ferrara	No Disqualification match	5:45
3	Jonathan Gresham defeated Cedric Alexander (with Veda Scott)	Singles match	3:32
4	Michael Elgin defeated Donovan Dijak (with Truth Martini)	Singles match	9:15
5	Mandy Leon and Sumie Sakai defeated Deonna Purrazzo and Hania The Huntress	Tag team match	7:10
6	The All Night Express (Rhett Titus and Kenny King) defeated Roppongi Vice (Baretta and Rocky Romero)	Tag team match	10:50
7	War Machine (Hanson and Raymond Rowe) defeated The House of Truth (Donovan Dijak and Joey Daddiego) (with Truth Martini)	Tag team match	3:32
8	Dalton Castle defeated Jay Briscoe, Matt Sydal and Moose (with Stokely Hathaway)	Four corner survival match	9:25
9	Kelly Klein (with B. J. Whitmer) defeated Taeler Hendrix (with Truth Martini), Veda Scott and Kimber Lee	Four corner survival match	7:28
10	The Addiction (Christopher Daniels and Frankie Kazarian) defeated Alex Shelley and A. C. H.	Tag team match	10:07
11	Mark Briscoe defeated Adam Page (with B. J. Whitmer and Colby Corino)	Singles match	6:33
12	The Young Bucks (Matt Jackson and Nick Jackson) (with A.J. Styles) defeated The Kingdom (Adam Cole and Michael Bennett) (with Maria Kanellis) and reDRagon (Bobby Fish and Kyle O'Reilly)	Three-way Philadelphia Street Fight	15:45

== See also ==
- List of Ring of Honor pay-per-view events
