= Final Battle 2013 =

12th Final Battle professional wrestling event

- Promotion: Ring of Honor
- Date: December 14, 2013
- City: Manhattan, New York
- Venue: Hammerstein Ballroom
- Attendance: 2,100

Event chronology
← Previous; Glory By Honor XII	Next → 12th Anniversary Show

ROH Final Battle chronology
← Previous; 2012	Next → 2014

Final Battle 2013 was the 12th Final Battle professional wrestling event produced by Ring of Honor (ROH), which occurred on December 14, 2013 at the Hammerstein Ballroom in Manhattan, New York.

== Production ==
Other on-screen personnel
Role	Name
Commentators	Kevin Kelly
Commentators	Nigel McGuinness
Commentators	Steve Corino

=== Background ===
Final Battle 2013 featured eight professional wrestling matches, which involved different wrestlers from pre-existing scripted feuds, plots, and storylines that played out on ROH's television programs. Wrestlers portrayed villains or heroes as they followed a series of events that built tension and culminated in a wrestling match or series of matches.

== Results ==
No.	Results	Stipulations	Times
1^{D}	The Brutal Burgers (Bob Evans and Cheeseburger) defeated Team Benchmark (Bill Daly and Will Ferrara)	Tag team match	—
2	Matt Hardy defeated Adam Page	Singles match	7:20
3	Silas Young defeated Mark Briscoe	Strap match	09:15
4	The Young Bucks (Matt Jackson and Nick Jackson) defeated Adrenaline Rush (A. C. H. and TaDarius Thomas)	Tag team match	12:29
5	Kevin Steen defeated Michael Bennett (with Maria Kanellis)	Stretcher match; loser must stop using the piledriver	16:44
6	reDRagon (c) (Bobby Fish and Kyle O'Reilly) defeated Outlaw Inc. (Eddie Kingston and Homicide)	Tag team match for the ROH World Tag Team Championship	15:07
7	Tommaso Ciampa defeated Matt Taven (c) (with Truth Martini and The Hoopla Hotties (Kasey Ray and Scarlett Bordeaux))	Singles match for the ROH World Television Championship	04:22
8	B. J. Whitmer and Eddie Edwards defeated Jay Lethal and Roderick Strong	Tag team match	16:20
9	Adam Cole (c) defeated Michael Elgin and Jay Briscoe	Three-Way match for the ROH World Championship	33:39
(c) / – the champion(s) heading into the match; D / – this was a dark match

== See also ==
- List of Ring of Honor pay-per-view events
