= Final Battle 2012: Doomsday =

Professional wrestling event

- Promotion: Ring of Honor
- Date: December 16, 2012
- City: New York, New York
- Venue: Hammerstein Ballroom
- Attendance: 2,000

Pay-per-view chronology
← Previous; Glory By Honor XI: The Unbreakable Hope	Next → 11th Anniversary Show

Final Battle chronology
← Previous; 2011	Next → 2013

Final Battle 2012: Doomsday was the 11th ROH Final Battle professional wrestling internet pay-per-view (iPPV) event produced by Ring of Honor (ROH). It took place on December 16, 2012 at the Hammerstein Ballroom in New York, New York.

== Production ==
Other on-screen personnel
Role	Name
Commentators	Kevin Kelly
Commentators	Caleb Seltzer
Commentators	Steve Corino

=== Storylines ===
Final Battle 2012: Doomsday featured professional wrestling matches which involved different wrestlers from pre-existing scripted feuds, plots, and storylines that played out on ROH's television programs. Wrestlers portrayed villains or heroes as they followed a series of events that built tension and culminated in a wrestling match or series of matches.

== Results ==
No.	Results	Stipulations	Times
1^{D}	Grizzly Redwood defeated QT Marshall	Singles match	—
2	Roderick Strong defeated Michael Elgin	Singles match	11:29
3	Jay Lethal defeated Rhino	Singles match	09:33
4	R.D. Evans (with Q.T. Marshall) defeated Prince Nana	Singles match	06:37
5	Wrestling's Greatest Tag Team (Shelton Benjamin and Charlie Haas) defeated Rhett Titus and B. J. Whitmer	New York City Street Fight	15:25
6	Mike Bennett (with Bob Evans and Maria Kanellis) defeated Jerry Lynn	Singles match	10:06
7	The American Wolves (Davey Richards and Eddie Edwards) defeated reDRagon (Bobby Fish and Kyle O'Reilly)	Tag Team match	12:29
8	Matt Hardy defeated Adam Cole	Singles match	11:41
9	The Briscoe Brothers (Jay Briscoe and Mark Briscoe) defeated S.C.U.M. (c) (Jimmy Jacobs and Steve Corino) and C&C Wrestle Factory (Caprice Coleman and Cedric Alexander)	Three-Way Tag Team match for the ROH World Tag Team Championship	06:57
10	Kevin Steen (c) defeated El Generico	Ladder War IV for the ROH World Championship	28:01
(c) / – the champion(s) heading into the match; D / – this was a dark match

== See also ==
- List of Ring of Honor pay-per-view events
