= Final Battle (2026) =

2026 Ring of Honor professional wrestling event

- Promotional poster featuring Bandido, El Sky Team (Mistico and Máscara Dorada), Athena, Deonna Purrazzo, and Lee Moriarty
- Promotion: Ring of Honor
- Date: December 4, 2026
- City: San Antonio, Texas
- Venue: Boeing Center at Tech Port

Event chronology
← Previous; Death Before Dishonor	Next → —

Final Battle chronology
← Previous; 2025	Next → —

The 2026 Final Battle is an upcoming professional wrestling pay-per-view and livestreaming event produced by American promotion Ring of Honor (ROH). The event is scheduled to take place on December 4, 2026 at the Boeing Center at Tech Port in San Antonio, Texas.

== Production ==
=== Background ===
Final Battle is a professional wrestling event produced by Ring of Honor. First held in 2002, it is traditionally ROH's last show in the calendar year. It is widely regarded as Ring of Honor's premiere flagship event, similar to WWE's WrestleMania.

On October 16, 2026, Tony Khan announced that the 2026 edition of Final Battle would take place on December 4 at the Boeing Center at Tech Port in San Antonio, Texas.

=== Storylines ===
The event featured professional wrestling matches that involved different wrestlers from pre-existing scripted feuds and storylines. Wrestlers portrayed villains, heroes, or less distinguishable characters in scripted events that build tension and culminated in a wrestling match or series of matches. Storylines were produced on ROH's weekly series ROH Honor Club TV exclusively on their streaming service Honor Club, on television programs of sister promotion All Elite Wrestling including Dynamite and Collision, and via promotional videos on both the ROH and AEW YouTube channels.

On November 6, 2026 it was announced that Athena announced her opponent for Final Battle 2026 for the ROH Women's World Championship who was Hyan. Prior or after on the November 3rd tapings of ROH The Minions (Billie Starkz & Diamante) were defeated by Hyan & Maya World as Athena watched ring side post-match.

== Matches ==
No.	Matches*	Stipulations
1	Athena (c) vs. Hyan	Singles match for the ROH Women’s World Championship
2	Action Andretti (c) vs. Adam Priest vs. ELP	Three-way match for the ROH World Television Championship
3	Bandido (c) vs. Mark Davis vs. 4 TBD	Survival of the Fittest match for the ROH World Championship
4	TBD vs. TBD	Tournament final for the vacant ROH Women's World Television Championship
5	Deonna Purrazzo (c) vs. Emi Sakura	Pure Wrestling Rules match for the ROH Women's Pure Championship
6	El Sky Team (Místico and Máscara Dorada) (c) or The Don Callis Family (Rocky Romero and Volador Jr.) vs. TBA	Tag team match for the ROH World Tag Team Championship
(c) / – the champion(s) heading into the match; *Card subject to change
