= Final Battle (2016) =

2016 Ring of Honor pay-per-view

- Promotional poster featuring Adam Cole
- Promotion: Ring of Honor
- Date: December 2, 2016
- City: New York City, New York
- Venue: Hammerstein Ballroom
- Attendance: 1,800
- Tagline: The End Is Near...

Pay-per-view chronology
← Previous; Survival of the Fittest (2016)	Next → ROH 15th Anniversary Show

Final Battle chronology
← Previous; 2015	Next → 2017

Final Battle (2016) was the 15th Final Battle professional wrestling pay-per-view (PPV) event produced by Ring of Honor (ROH). It took place on December 2, 2016 at the Hammerstein Ballroom in New York City, New York.

== Production ==
=== Storylines ===
Other on-screen personnel
Role	Name
Commentators	Kevin Kelly
Commentators	Steve Corino

Final Battle featured professional wrestling matches, which involved different wrestlers from pre-existing scripted feuds, plots, and storylines that played out on ROH's television programs prior to the show. Wrestlers portrayed villains or heroes as they followed a series of events that built tension and culminated in a wrestling match or series of matches.

== Results ==
No.	Results	Stipulations	Times
1^{P}	Cheeseburger and Will Ferrara defeated The Tempura Boyz (Sho and Yohey)	Tag team match	—
2	The Rebellion (Caprice Coleman, Kenny King and Rhett Titus) defeated Donovan Dijak and The Motor City Machine Guns (Alex Shelley and Chris Sabin)	Six-man tag team match	12:22
3	Silas Young (with Beer City Bruiser) defeated Jushin Thunder Liger	Singles match	11:04
4	Dalton Castle defeated Colt Cabana	Singles match	10:22
5	Cody defeated Jay Lethal	Singles match	13:15
6	The Kingdom (Matt Taven, T. K. O'Ryan and Vinny Marseglia) defeated Kushida, Lio Rush and Jay White	Six-man tag team tournament final to determine the first ROH World Six-Man Tag Team Champions	15:25
7	Marty Scurll (c) defeated Dragon Lee and Will Ospreay	Three-way match for the ROH World Television Championship	10:46
8	The Young Bucks (Matt Jackson and Nick Jackson) (c) defeated The Briscoes (Jay Briscoe and Mark Briscoe)	Tag team match for the ROH World Tag Team Championship	15:37
9	Kyle O'Reilly defeated Adam Cole (c)	No Disqualification match for the ROH World Championship	18:48
(c) / – the champion(s) heading into the match; P / – the match was broadcast on the pre-show

=== Tournament bracket ===
First round All Star Extravaganza VIII; September 30, 2016; ROH Wrestling tapings
A. C. H., Jay White and Kushida	Pin
The Briscoes (Jay Briscoe and Mark Briscoe) and Toru Yano	14:00
The Cabinet (Caprice Coleman, Kenny King and Rhett Titus)	Pin
Jason Kincaid, Leon St. Giovanni and Shaheem Ali	9:31
Bullet Club (Adam Cole, Matt Jackson and Nick Jackson)	Pin
The Kingdom (Matt Taven, T. K. O'Ryan and Vinny Marseglia)	12:02
The Addiction (Christopher Daniels and Frankie Kazarian) and Kamaitachi	Pin
Team CMLL (Hechicero, Okumura and Último Guerrero)	11:12

Semifinals; ROH Wrestling tapings
A. C. H., Jay White and Kushida	Pin
The Cabinet (Caprice Coleman, Kenny King and Rhett Titus)	11:42
The Kingdom (Matt Taven, T. K. O'Ryan and Vinny Marseglia)	Pin
Team CMLL (Hechicero, Okumura and Último Guerrero)	9:34

Final; Final Battle^{1} December 2, 2016
Lio Rush^{1} , Jay White and Kushida	Pin
The Kingdom (Matt Taven, T. K. O'Ryan and Vinny Marseglia)	17:00

1 Lio Rush replaced A. C. H. in the tournament due to A.C.H. departing and being Released from ROH fulfilling his dreams and separate goals by seemingly taking independent bookings, indicating his departure from ROH.

== See also ==
- List of Ring of Honor pay-per-view events
- 2016 in professional wrestling
