= Final Battle 2014 =

Professional wrestling event

- Promotion: Ring of Honor
- Date: December 7, 2014
- City: New York City, New York
- Venue: Terminal 5
- Attendance: 1,000

Pay-per-view chronology
← Previous; All Star Extravaganza VI	Next → 13th Anniversary Show

Final Battle chronology
← Previous; 2013	Next → 2015

Final Battle 2014 was the 13th Final Battle professional wrestling pay-per-view event produced by Ring of Honor (ROH). It took place on December 7, 2014, at Terminal 5 in New York City, New York.

== Production ==
Other on-screen personnel
Role:	Name:
Commentators	Kevin Kelly
Commentators	Steve Corino
Commentators	Nigel McGuinness

=== Storylines ===
Final Battle 2014 featured eight professional wrestling matches, which involved different wrestlers from pre-existing scripted feuds, plots, and storylines that played out on ROH's television programs. Wrestlers portrayed villains or heroes as they followed a series of events that built tension and culminated in a wrestling match or series of matches.

== Results ==
No.	Results	Stipulations	Times
1^{D}	The Brutal Burgers (Bob Evans & Cheeseburger) defeated B. J. Whitmer & Mikey Webb	Tag team match	—
2	Hanson defeated Jimmy Jacobs (with B. J. Whitmer), Mark Briscoe and Caprice Coleman	Four corner survival match	10:44
3	Roderick Strong defeated Adam Page (with B. J. Whitmer and Jimmy Jacobs) via referee stoppage	Singles match	12:06
4	Michael Elgin defeated Tommaso Ciampa	Singles match	13:21
5	A. C. H. and The Young Bucks (Matt Jackson and Nick Jackson) defeated Cedric Alexander and The Addiction (Christopher Daniels and Frankie Kazarian)	Six-man tag team match	12:43
6	Moose (with Prince Nana and Stokely Hathaway) defeated R.D. Evans (with Veda Scott)	Singles match	7:34
7	Jay Lethal (with Truth Martini and J Diesel) (c) defeated Matt Sydal	Singles match for the ROH World Television Championship	15:03
8	reDRagon (Bobby Fish and Kyle O'Reilly) (c) defeated Time Splitters (Alex Shelley and Kushida) via submission	Tag team match for the ROH World Tag Team Championship	18:09
9	Jay Briscoe (c) defeated Adam Cole	Fight Without Honor for the ROH World Championship	21:19
(c) / – the champion(s) heading into the match; D / – this was a dark match

== See also ==
- List of Ring of Honor pay-per-view events
