= Final Battle 2007 =

2007 Ring of Honor event

- Promotion: Ring of Honor
- Date: December 30, 2007
- City: New York, New York
- Venue: Manhattan Center
- Attendance: 1,000

Event chronology
← Previous; Rising Above	Next → ROH 6th Anniversary Show

Final Battle chronology
← Previous; 2006	Next → 2008

Final Battle 2007 was the 6th Final Battle major professional wrestling event produced by Ring of Honor (ROH). It occurred on December 30, 2007, from the Manhattan Center in New York City.

It was the fifth annual event in the Final Battle chronology, with the first in 2002.

== Background ==
Other on-screen personnel
Role	Name
Commentators	Dave Prazak
Commentators	Lenny Leonard

=== Storylines ===
Final Battle featured nine professional wrestling matches involving wrestlers from pre-existing scripted feuds and storylines. Wrestlers were portrayed as either villains or heroes in the scripted events that built tension and culminated in a wrestling match.

One of the show's two main events featured Nigel McGuinness defending the ROH World Championship in a Four Way Fray against Bryan Danielson, Chris Hero and Takeshi Morishima. However, the night before, McGuinness was severely injured in his defense against Austin Aries. During the match, Aries dove from the ring, smashing Nigel's face on the edge of the guard rail, resulting in a concussion, a broken nose and a gash above his eye that needed 15 stitches. As a result, Aries was added to the Four Way Fray, with the winner getting a shot at the ROH World Championship at the Sixth Anniversary Show.

== Results ==
No.	Results	Stipulations	Times
1^{D}	Bobby Dempsey defeated Mitch Franklin	Singles match	—
2	The Vulture Squad (Jigsaw and Ruckus) defeated Bobby Fish and Matt Cross	Tag team match	8:01
3	Larry Sweeney (with Sweet n' Sour Inc.) defeated Claudio Castagnoli	Singles match	2:29
4	Jack Evans (with Julius Smokes) defeated Necro Butcher	No Disqualification match	11:15
5	Naomichi Marufuji defeated Davey Richards	Singles match	15:13
6	The Hangmen 3 (Adam Pearce, B. J. Whitmer and Brent Albright) (with Shane Hagadorn) defeated Delirious, Kevin Steen and El Generico	Six-man tag team "Tables are Legal" match	18:24
7	Rocky Romero defeated Ernie Osiris	Singles match	1:10
8	Erick Stevens defeated Roderick Strong (c)	Singles match for the FIP World Heavyweight Championship	20:51
9	Bryan Danielson defeated Austin Aries, Chris Hero (with Sweet n' Sour Inc.) and Takeshi Morishima	Four Way Fray number 1 contender match for the ROH World Heavyweight Championship in ROH 6th Anniversary Show	20:50
10	The Age of the Fall (Jimmy Jacobs and Tyler Black) defeated The Briscoe Brothers (Jay Briscoe and Mark Briscoe) (c)	Tag team match for the ROH World Tag Team Championship	18:54
(c) / – the champion(s) heading into the match; D / – this was a dark match

== See also ==
- List of Ring of Honor pay-per-view events
