= Bobby Fish =

American professional wrestler (born 1976)

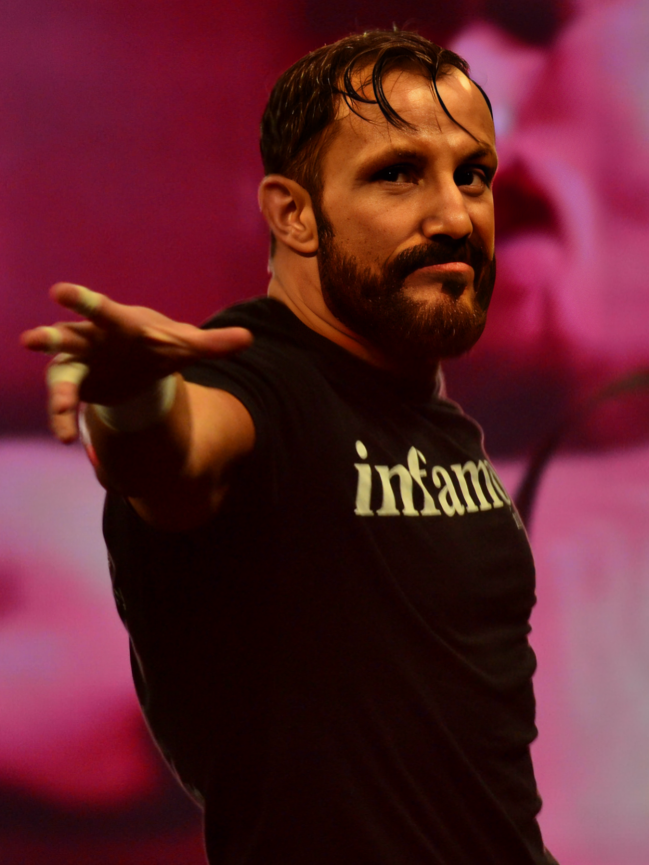
- Fish in 2016

Personal information
- Born: Robert Anthony Fish; October 27, 1976 (age 50) Albany, New York, U.S.
- Education: Siena College
- Spouse: Erin Lane (m. 2022)
- Children: 2

Professional wrestling career
- Ring name(s): Bobby Fish; Madden Fisher; Jerk Jackson
- Billed height: 5 ft 11 in (180 cm)
- Billed weight: 197 lb (89 kg)
- Billed from: Albany, New York; Saratoga Springs, New York
- Trained by: Tony DeVito; Harley Race
- Debut: 2002

Robert Anthony Fish (born October 27, 1976) is an American professional wrestler. He is currently a freelancer on the independent circuit. He is best known for his tenure with WWE, where he performed on the NXT brand and was a member of The Undisputed Era. He is also known for his tenures with All Elite Wrestling (AEW) where he was a member of The The Elite and reDRagon and Major League Wrestling (MLW) where he was a member of The Rogue Horsemen.

In WWE, he is a former two-time NXT Tag Team Champion alongside his tag team partner Kyle O'Reilly. He is also known for his time with All Elite Wrestling (AEW) from 2021 to 2022 and Ring of Honor (ROH) from 2014 to 2017, where he wrestled as one-half of the tag team reDRagon (also with O'Reilly) and held the ROH World Tag Team Championship three times and the ROH World Television Championship once. He made appearances in Japan, both for Pro Wrestling Noah and for New Japan Pro-Wrestling, where he held the IWGP Junior Heavyweight Tag Team Championship twice.

== Early life ==
Robert Anthony Fish was born on October 27, 1976, in Albany, New York, and is the youngest of three children to Richard and Ann Fish. Fish's father worked as a firefighter in Albany, and was a former U.S. Marine. He grew up near Central Avenue. Fish attended Colonie Central High School, where he played as a linebacker for the football team. He then played football at Hudson Valley Community College, before moving to Siena College during his junior year. He graduated in 2000, with a bachelor's degree in English, becoming the first member of his family to graduate from college. He previously worked as a bartender and also returned to his former high school as a substitute teacher, while working independent events on the weekends. In 2012, he was about to take a job at a Target distribution center in Wilton, until Ring of Honor offered him a contract, continuing his wrestling career.

== Professional wrestling career ==
=== Early career (2002–2006) ===
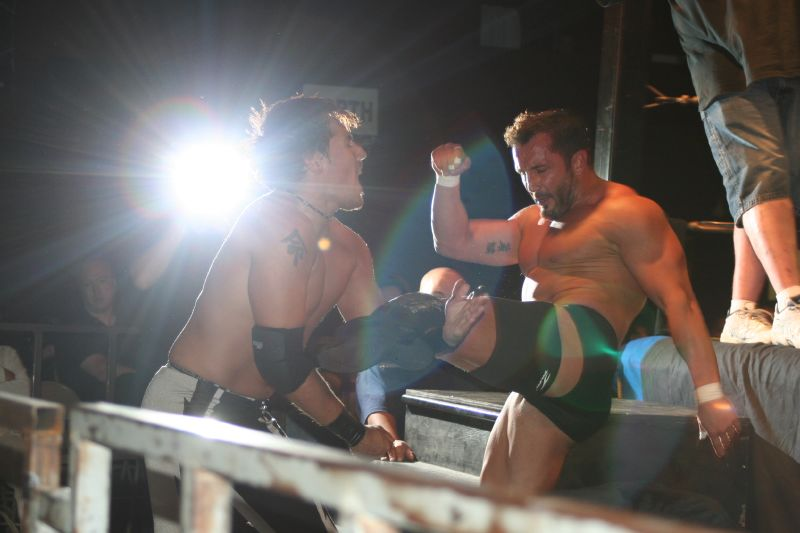
Azrieal (left) getting kicked by Fish during a Velocity Pro Wrestling show in September 2008.

Bobby Fish made his pro wrestling debut in 2002 after training with Tony DeVito and Harley Race. He competed for several years in the Northeast under the names Jerkin Jackson and Madden Fisher before settling on the name he continues to use, Bobby Fish. He made his debut for Ring of Honor on October 2, 2004, where he teamed with Scott Cardinal and lost to the Rebel's Army. He was utilized as a jobber for ROH for the entirety of his early appearances. Fish wrestled for Pro Wrestling Unplugged for the majority of his early career making his debut in February 2005. He formed a partnership with Scott Cardinal, whom he had wrestled many times on the Northeast indie scene. On May 20, he and Cardinal defeated three other teams to win the vacant PWU Tag Team Championship before vacating them in September. In November 2005, he became the inaugural Collision Pro Wrestling Champion.

After returning from his first tour with Noah, Fish returned to the Northeastern independent circuit and continued to compete there when he returned from Noah tours. Fish wrestled for New England Championship Wrestling regularly between his early tours of Noah. In April 2007, he defeated DC Dillinger by disqualification in a match for the NECW Undisputed Triple Crown Championship, but failed to win the title. Fish took part in Iron 8 2007, making it to the finals where he lost to Eddie Edwards. Fish returned to ROH at Reborn Again in a loss to Claudio Castagnoli, teamed with Matt Cross at Final Battle 2007 in a loss against the Vulture Squad (Ruckus and Jigsaw), and appeared in several matches on Ring of Honor Wrestling in 2009.

In 2009, he was announced as one of the participants scheduled to wrestle on the first Evolve Wrestling show. On January 10, 2010, he performed in the opening match at Evolve 1, in which he lost to Kyle O'Reilly via pinfall.

=== Pro Wrestling Noah (2006–2013) ===
Fish first toured Japan in 2006 with Pro Wrestling Noah, making his debut on May 19, 2006, defeating Atsushi Aoki. For a number of years Fish toured with Noah at least once a year, sometimes enjoying several tours a year. In 2010, Fish and Eddie Edwards lost to Ricky Marvin and Taiji Ishimori in the semi-final of the GHC Junior Heavyweight Tag Team Championship tournament. Fish participated in 2011s Global League gaining only four points. In 2012, Fish and Edwards participated in NTV G Cup Junior Heavyweight League, once again gaining four points. From April 17 to 24, 2013, Fish and Edwards took part in the 2013 Global Tag League, where they won one of their four matches, failing to advance from their block.

=== Ring of Honor (2012–2017) ===
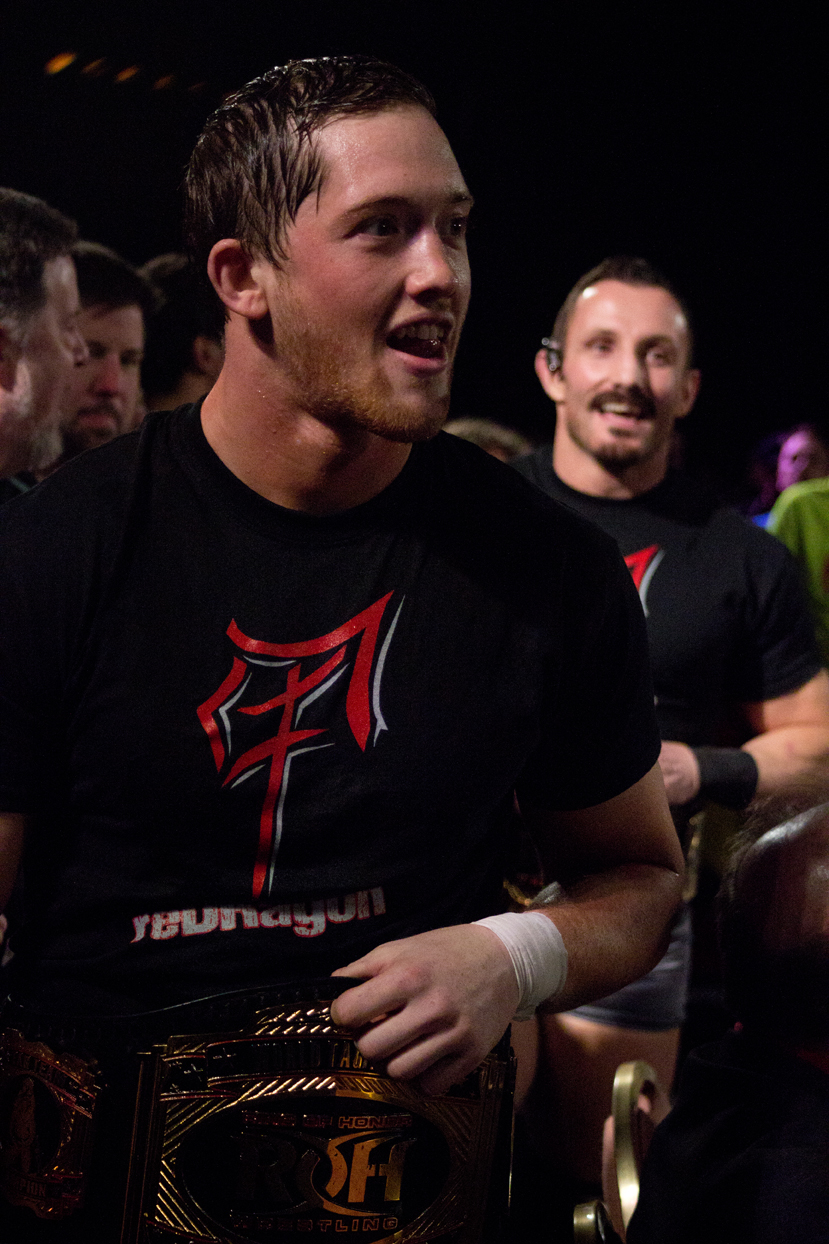
Fish (right) and Kyle O'Reilly appearing in Ring of Honor as the tag team "reDRagon" in April 2013. The duo held the ROH World Tag Team Championship on three occasions from 2013 to 2014.

In 2012, Fish returned to Ring of Honor, where he formed a tag team with Kyle O'Reilly named "reDRagon". On March 2, 2013, reDRagon defeated the Briscoe Brothers for the ROH World Tag Team Championship. They successfully defended the championship against Alabama Attitude (Corey Hollis and Mike Posey) that same month, and retained it at Best in the World 2013 in June in a three-way match against the C & C Wrestle Factory (Caprice Coleman and Cedric Alexander) and S.C.U.M. (Cliff Compton and Rhett Titus). They lost the title to Forever Hooligans (Alex Koslov and Rocky Romero) on July 27. They regained the title from the American Wolves (Davey Richards and Eddie Edwards) on August 17. Throughout the remainder of 2013, reDRagon successfully defended the championship against teams including the C & C Wrestle Factory, the Forever Hooligans, Jay Lethal and Michael Elgin, and Outlaw, Inc. (Homicide and Eddie Kingston). In 2014, they retained the championship against Adrenaline Rush (ACH and TaDarius Thomas) at the 12th Anniversary Show in February, before losing the title on March 8 to The Young Bucks.

Fish and O'Reilly regained the tag team championship from The Young Bucks on May 17, at the ROH and New Japan Pro-Wrestling (NJPW) co-promoted pay-per-view War of the Worlds. They successfully defended the championship against The Briscoe Brothers on June 7 and against Christopher Daniels and Frankie Kazarian at ROH's first live pay-per-view Best in the World 2014 on June 22. On November 23, 2014, reDRagon defeated ACH and Matt Sydal, The Addiction and The Briscoes to retain the ROH World Tag Team Championship and win the Tag Wars tournament. They followed up their victory with successful defenses against the Time Splitters (Alex Shelley and Kushida) at Final Battle 2014, The Young Bucks at the ROH 13th Anniversary Show, and The Kingdom (Michael Bennett and Matt Taven) at Supercard of Honor IX in March 2015. Fish and O'Reilly lost the tag team title to The Addiction (Daniels and Kazarian) at the Ring of Honor Wrestling tapings on April 4.

On May 13, during the second night of War of the Worlds '15, Fish unsuccessfully challenged Jay Briscoe for the ROH World Championship. On December 18, 2015, during Final Battle, Fish unsuccessfully challenged Roderick Strong for the ROH World Television Championship.

On May 8, 2016, at Global Wars, Fish defeated Tomohiro Ishii to become the new ROH World Television Champion. He lost the title to Will Ospreay on November 18. Fish was scheduled to compete in a four-way match for the Television title at Final Battle, against champion Marty Scurll, Will Ospreay, and Dragon Lee, but was forced to pull out due to a family emergency. On January 3, 2017, it was reported that Fish had re-signed with ROH. Fish was unsuccessful in an attempt to win the ROH World Championship from Adam Cole at Manhattan Mayhem VI. In March 2017, Fish announced his departure from Ring of Honor.

=== New Japan Pro-Wrestling (2014–2016) ===
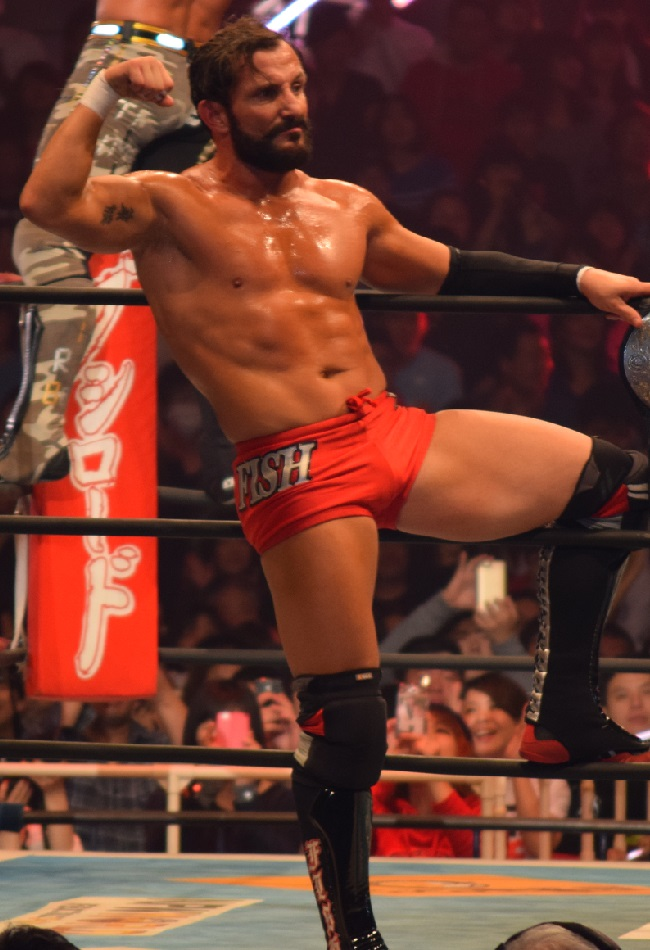
Fish appearing with New Japan Pro-Wrestling in November 2015

Through ROH's relationship with NJPW, reDRagon made an appearance for the Japanese promotion on August 10, 2014, unsuccessfully challenging Time Splitters (Alex Shelley and Kushida) for the IWGP Junior Heavyweight Tag Team Championship. reDRagon returned to NJPW on October 25 to take part in the 2014 Super Jr. Tag Tournament. On November 3, reDRagon defeated The Young Bucks in the finals to win the tournament. Five days later at Power Struggle, reDRagon defeated Time Splitters in a rematch to become the new IWGP Junior Heavyweight Tag Team Champions. They made their first successful title defense on January 4, 2015, at Wrestle Kingdom 9 in Tokyo Dome, in a four-way match against Forever Hooligans, Time Splitters and The Young Bucks. On February 11 at The New Beginning in Osaka, reDRagon lost the title to The Young Bucks in a three-way match, also involving Time Splitters.

reDRagon returned to NJPW on May 3, 2015, at Wrestling Dontaku 2015, where they unsuccessfully challenged for the IWGP Junior Heavyweight Tag Team Championship in a three-way match with Roppongi Vice (Beretta and Rocky Romero) and The Young Bucks. Later that month, Fish entered the 2015 Best of the Super Juniors. He finished second in his block with a record of five wins and two losses, narrowly missing advancement to the finals of the tournament. Following the tournament, reDRagon received a rematch for the IWGP Junior Heavyweight Tag Team Championship in a three-way match, also involving Roppongi Vice, but were again defeated by The Young Bucks on July 5 at Dominion 7.5 in Osaka-jo Hall. On August 16, reDRagon defeated The Young Bucks to win the IWGP Junior Heavyweight Tag Team Championship for the second time. They lost the title back to The Young Bucks in a four-way match on January 4, 2016, at Wrestle Kingdom 10 in Tokyo Dome. On September 17 at Destruction in Tokyo, Fish received his first singles title shot in NJPW, when he unsuccessfully challenged Katsuyori Shibata for the NEVER Openweight Championship.

=== WWE (2017–2021) ===
Fish made his debut in WWE's developmental territory NXT at the June 23, 2017 television tapings, losing to Aleister Black. Triple H confirmed Fish's signing on July 12. At NXT TakeOver: Brooklyn III, Fish, alongside O'Reilly (who had also signed with WWE), attacked SAnitY after they defeated the Authors of Pain to win the NXT Tag Team Championships. Later on in the night, the two assisted the debuting Adam Cole in attacking newly crowned NXT Champion Drew McIntyre, turning Fish heel in the process. The following month, the trio of Fish, Cole and O'Reilly was officially dubbed "The Undisputed Era". The trio faced the teams of Sanity and Authors of Pain and Roderick Strong in a WarGames match at NXT TakeOver: WarGames. During the match, The Undisputed Era emerged victorious. On the December 20 episode of NXT, Fish and O'Reilly defeated Sanity to win the NXT Tag Team Championship. At NXT TakeOver: Philadelphia, Fish and O'Reilly defeated The Authors of Pain to retain the NXT Tag Team Championships. On March 4, Fish suffered a torn ACL and torn MCL in his left knee at an NXT live event. He later underwent surgery and was out of action for six months. During his absence, Fish's role as champion was filled by Cole and later on by Roderick Strong, who joined the stable at NXT TakeOver: New Orleans. After returning on October 17, at NXT TakeOver: WarGames the stable were defeated by the team of Pete Dunne, Ricochet, and War Raiders in a WarGames match.

Fish and O'Reilly regained the titles on the August 16 tapings of NXT. At NXT TakeOver: WarGames, The Undisputed Era were defeated by Team Ciampa in a WarGames match. The next night, at Survivor Series, Fish and O'Reilly faced The New Day and the Viking Raiders in a triple threat tag team match but were defeated as the Viking Raiders won the match. Heading into 2020, Fish and O'Reilly entered the Dusty Rhodes Tag Team Classic and defeated Gallus in the first round, but were defeated by the Grizzled Young Veterans in the second round. The Undisputed Era entered a brief feud with Imperium and it was announced that the two factions would face each other at Worlds Collide. At the event, Imperium defeated The Undisputed Era. At NXT TakeOver: Portland, Fish and O'Reilly dropped the titles to The BroserWeights (Pete Dunne and Matt Riddle) ending their reign at 172 days. Over the summer, The Undisputed Era slowly turned face as they assisted Cole in his feud with Pat McAfee which culminated in a WarGames match at NXT TakeOver: WarGames, where The Undisputed Era defeated Team McAfee. However, during the match, Fish suffered an injury to his triceps, taking him out of action once again. During his absence, The Undisputed Era disbanded following Cole's betrayal of O'Reilly and Strong. While Fish returned on the May 11, 2021 episode of NXT, Fish then made his in-ring return on the May 25 episode, where he faced Dunne in a losing effort. he worked on NXT until his release on August 6.

=== Major League Wrestling (2021) ===
Fish was announced to appear at Major League Wrestling, where he debuted as a participant in the 2021 Opera Cup tournament at Fightland, defeating Lee Moriarty in the quarterfinal before losing to Davey Richards in the semifinal.

=== All Elite Wrestling (2021–2022) ===
Fish made his debut for All Elite Wrestling (AEW) on the October 6, 2021 episode of Dynamite, where he challenged Sammy Guevara for the AEW TNT Championship, but was unsuccessful. After the event, it was announced that he had signed a contract with the company. Fish reunited with his Undisputed Era stablemate Adam Cole as part of The Elite and, in December, with Kyle O'Reilly, who left WWE to work for AEW. On the February 23, 2022 episode of Dynamite, Fish and O'Reilly won a 10-team battle royal to earn a place in the Triple Threat match for the AEW Tag Team Championship at Revolution. At the event, Fish and O'Reilly were unsuccessful, as Jurassic Express retained the championship. On August 31, 2022, Fish's contract with AEW expired and his contract was not renewed, thus making him a free agent.

=== Impact Wrestling (2022) ===
On September 23, 2022, at the Victory Road event, Fish made his debut in Impact Wrestling, where he was confronted by Raj Singh and Shera, and Fish managed to take both men down. Two weeks later, at Bound for Glory, Fish made his Impact in-ring debut by competing in the Call Your Shot Gauntlet match, being eliminated by Steve Maclin. On October 13 episode of Impact!, Fish challenged Josh Alexander for the Impact World Championship, but failed to win the title.

Fish did not appear again for the company before his profile was removed from Impact's official website in late 2022.

=== Return to NJPW (2022–2023) ===
Fish would return on the episode November 20, 2022 of NJPW Strong, defeating Kevin Blackwood. Later in the show, Fish would join Team Filthy by attacking Homicide. Fish quietly departed Team Filthy after being defeated by David Finlay on the Battle in the Valley pre-show.

=== Return to MLW (2024–2026) ===
On February 6, 2024, it was announced that Fish would return to Major League Wrestling on February 29 at Intimidation Games against former MLW World Heavyweight Champion Alex Kane. Fish lost the match, after passing out to the rear-naked choke.

== Professional wrestling persona ==
Sporting an iconic Van Dyke beard, Fish is often seen wearing a custom mouth guard during his matches, usually with a shark-tooth design. Along with tag team partner Kyle O'Reilly, his entrance theme in both ROH and AEW was "Dance Away" by the band Damn Valentines; in NXT, he used the song "Behind Bars" by Auracle.

== Amateur kickboxing career ==
Fish trained with Jerrick Jones at Albany Boxing before his kickboxing debut on January 29, 2010. He had his first fight for the Cage Wars organization at the Washington Avenue Armory in Albany, New York, and defeated Justin Pierpoint by technical knockout in the third round after Pierpoint suffered a broken nose at the end of the second.

== Other media ==
Fish made his video game debut as a playable character in WWE 2K19. He is also a playable character in WWE 2K20.

== Personal life ==
Fish married Erin Lane on July 17, 2022. He has two daughters from a previous relationship.

== Championships and accomplishments ==
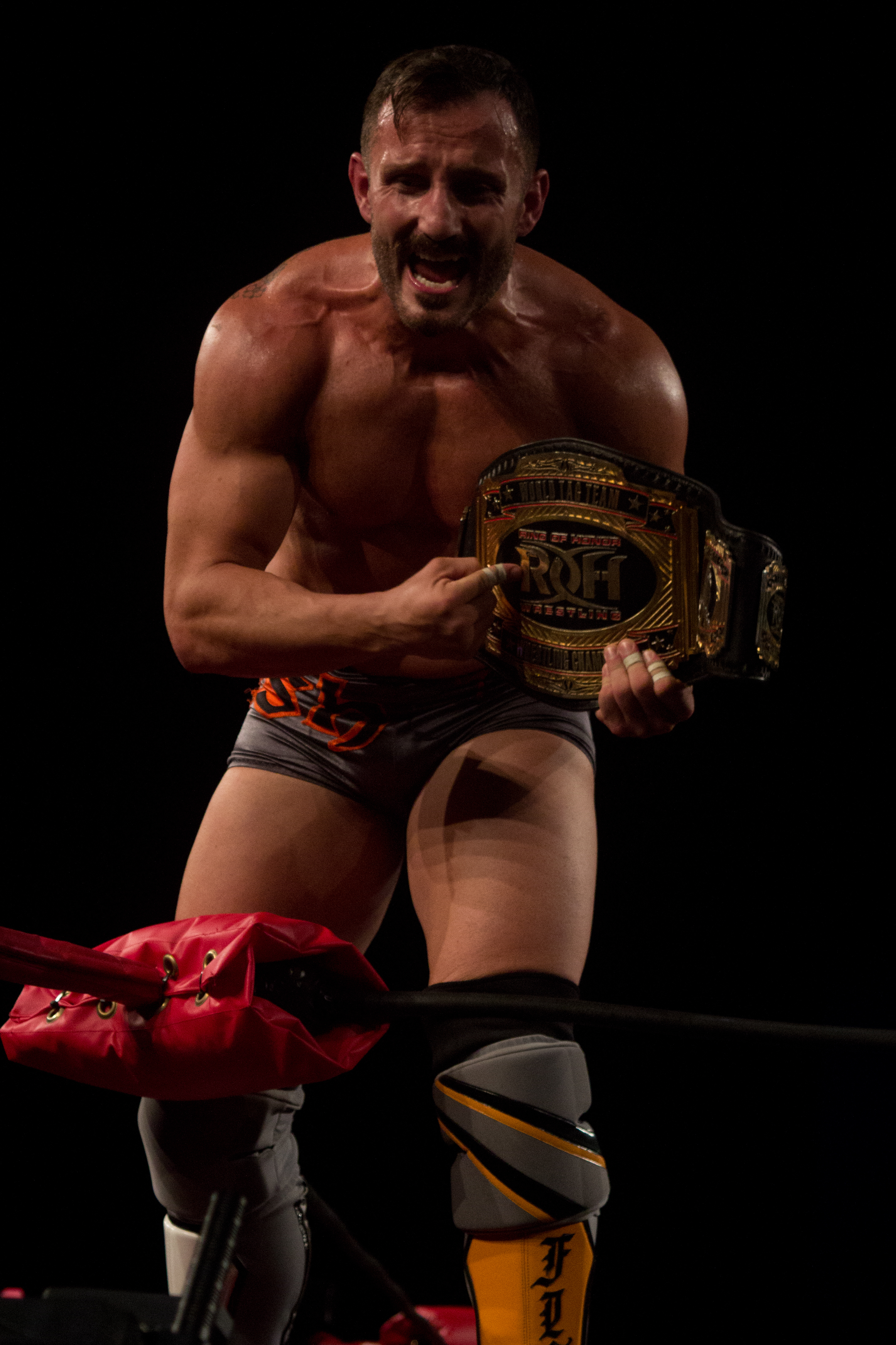
Fish is a three-time ROH World Tag Team Champion.

- Apple City Championship Wrestling
  - ACCW Apple City Championship (1 time)
- Atomic Legacy Wrestling
  - ALW Next Level Championship (1 time)
- High Risk Wrestling
  - HRW Tag Team Championship (1 time) – with Kyle O'Reilly
- New England Championship Wrestling
  - NECW Heavyweight Championship (1 time)
- New Japan Pro-Wrestling
  - IWGP Junior Heavyweight Tag Team Championship (2 times) – with Kyle O'Reilly
  - Super Jr. Tag Tournament (2014) – with Kyle O'Reilly
- Pro Wrestling Illustrated
  - Tag Team of the Year (2019) – with Kyle O'Reilly
  - Ranked No. 26 of the top 500 singles wrestlers in the PWI 500 in 2016
- Pro Wrestling Noah
  - NTV G+ Cup Jr. Heavyweight Tag League Fighting Spirit Award (2012) – with Eddie Edwards
- Pro Wrestling Unscripted
  - PWU Tag Team Championship (1 time) – with Scott Cardinal
- Ring of Honor
  - ROH World Tag Team Championship (3 times) – with Kyle O'Reilly
  - ROH World Television Championship (1 time)
  - ROH World Television Championship #1 Contender Tournament (2015)
  - Tag Wars Tournament (2014) – with Kyle O'Reilly
  - Survival of the Fittest (2016)
- The Establishment Wrestling
  - Florida Grand Prix Showcase (2024)
- Upstate Pro Wrestling
  - UPW Heavyweight Championship (1 time)
  - UPW World Tag Team Championship (1 time) – with Brandon Cutler
- WWE
  - NXT Tag Team Championship (2 times) – with Kyle O'Reilly, Adam Cole and Roderick Strong (1), Kyle O'Reilly (1) (Note: Fish and O'Reilly originally won the title as a duo, but Cole and Strong also became recognized as champions under the Freebird Rule after Fish suffered an injury.)
  - NXT Year-End Award (2 times)
    - Tag Team of the Year (2019) – with Kyle O'Reilly
    - Tag Team of the Year (2020) – with Kyle O'Reilly, Adam Cole and Roderick Strong

== Professional boxing record ==
1 fight	1 win	0 losses
By knockout	1	0

No.	Result	Record	Opponent	Type	Round, time	Date	Location	Notes
1	Win	1–0	Boateng Prempeh	KO	2 (4), 1:02	Nov 13, 2022	Coca-Cola Arena, Dubai, UAE	
