= Final Battle 2009 =

2009 Ring of Honor pay-per-view

- Promotional poster for the event, featuring The American Wolves and the Briscoe Brothers
- Promotion: Ring of Honor
- Date: December 19, 2009
- City: New York, New York
- Venue: Manhattan Center
- Attendance: 1,300

Pay-per-view chronology
← Previous; Take No Prisoners	Next → The Big Bang!

Final Battle chronology
← Previous; 2008	Next → 2010

Final Battle 2009 was a professional wrestling pay-per-view (PPV) event produced by Ring of Honor (ROH), which was only available online via GoFightLive. It took place on December 19, 2009 from the Manhattan Center in New York City. Nine matches were aired live from the show, and a bonus match aired during the intermission.

It was the seventh annual event in the Final Battle chronology, with the first taking place in 2002. It was the first ROH event to be shown as an online pay-per-view, and the first to be aired live.

== Production ==
On November 23, 2009, ROH announced that they had signed a pay-per-view deal with Go Fight Live (GFL) to air live events over the Internet. The first event to be aired as part of this deal was Final Battle 2009.

On December 15, 2009, ROH announced the formation of its video on demand service through GFL to complement the live broadcast of Final Battle 2009. Beginning on December 15, five taped ROH events were broadcast leading up to Final Battle 2009. The events aired were Glory By Honor IV, Death Before Dishonor IV, Final Battle 2006, Glory By Honor V: Night 2, and Glory By Honor VI: Night Two.

Due to a blizzard, Necro Butcher was unable to attend the event, and Teddy Hart and Jack Evans arrived late, forcing their scheduled match to be changed.

=== Storylines ===
Final Battle featured nine professional wrestling matches that involved different wrestlers from pre-existing scripted feuds and storylines. Wrestlers were portrayed as either villains or heroes in the scripted events that built tension and culminated in a wrestling match.

On November 19, 2009, ROH announced that Tyler Black would receive an ROH World Championship match at Final Battle 2009 as a result of winning the Survival of the Fittest tournament.

The feud between the Briscoe Brothers (Jay Briscoe and Mark Briscoe) and The American Wolves of Eddie Edwards and Davey Richards began at Final Battle 2008 in December 2008. At the event, The American Wolves attacked the Briscoe Brothers and injured Mark's knee. As a result of the legitimate injury, Mark was sidelined for several months to recover. Upon his return, the Briscoes won a tag team battle royal on the October 5 episode of Ring of Honor Wrestling to earn a World Tag Team Championship match against The American Wolves. They received the title match on September 19 at Final Countdown Tour: Chicago, but won by disqualification after Richards attacked the referee. As a result, they did not win the championship. At the Ring of Honor Wrestling tapings in early November, the Briscoes became the number one contenders to the World Tag Team Championship by defeating the team of Kevin Steen and El Generico, and the championship match was announced for Final Battle.

On November 10, ROH announced that two Asistencia Asesoría y Administración (AAA) wrestlers, former ROH World Tag Team Champion, Rocky Romero and Alex Koslov, would both be returning to ROH for a series of shows. The following day, they announced that two more AAA wrestlers, former ROH competitors Jack Evans and Teddy Hart, would also be appearing for two shows, including Final Battle 2009. On November 23, ROH announced that the match for the AAA competitors would be a tag team match, with Hart and Koslov wrestling the duo of Evans and Romero.

== Event ==
Other on-screen personnel
Commentators	Dave Prazak
Commentators	Eric Santamaria

Before the event, there was an untelevised match for the live crowd in attendance, in which Andy "Right Leg" Ridge defeated Alex "Sugarfoot" Payne.

=== Preliminary matches ===
The event began with a video promo package of the scripted feud between Austin Aries and Tyler Black, and the three commentators, Dave Prazak, Eric Santamaria, and Larry Sweeney were introduced.

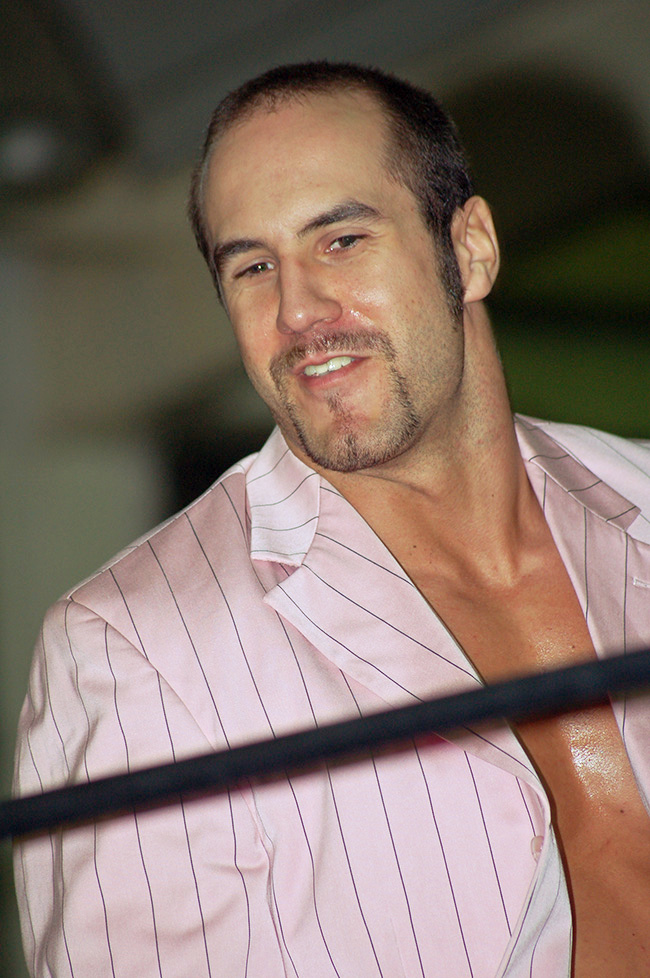
Claudio Castagnoli won a Pick 6 Contenders Series four-corner survival match

The first match that aired was a Pick 6 Contenders Series four-corner survival match, which featured Claudio Castagnoli, Rhett Titus, Kenny Omega, and Colt Cabana. The Pick 6 Contenders Series is a ranking system in ROH, which determines the challengers for the ROH World Championship. Prior to the match both Castagnoli and Omega were in the Pick 6, Castagnoli as number one and Omega as number six. Cabana and Omega worked together throughout the match, teaming up on Castagnoli and Titus, until Omega performed a Ura–nage slam on Cabana. Castagnoli won the match by pinning Titus after a German suplex. Immediately following this match, a video promo of Tyler Black was aired.

The second match was originally scheduled to be Erick Stevens and Bison Smith versus Delirious and Necro Butcher, however, due to the blizzard in the United States, Necro Butcher was unable to be at the show. As a result, Prince Nana, Stevens' and Smith's manager, insulted Butcher prior to the match, before Delirious interrupted. Delirious began the match on his own, but Pelle Primeau came out to help shortly afterwards. Smith press slammed Primeau to the outside, eliminating him from the match, and causing Bobby Dempsey to come to Delirious' aid instead. A notable spot in the match involved Smith performing a backbreaker on Dempsey across Stevens' knee. Stevens and Smith won the match by pinfall, after Smith performed a powerbomb on Dempsey.

The third match that aired was a Fight Without Honor between Eddie Kingston and Chris Hero. The match began with both men brawling, until Hero got the upper hand by using a steel chain on Kingston, making him bleed. In the middle of the match, Hero removed a section of the barricade and placed it in the ring, balancing it on the ring ropes to form a platform. Hero then ganso powerbombed Kingston from the top rope onto the barricade for a near-fall. Kingston took the advantage by using the steel chain, and performed a capture suplex on Sara Del Rey, Hero's manager, when she interfered in the match. Kingston won the match by pinfall after performing Hero's own finishing move, the Rolling Elbow, on Hero while wearing Hero's loaded elbow pad.

The final contest before the intermission was a tag team match in which The Young Bucks (Nick and Matt Jackson) faced Kevin Steen and El Generico. The story of the match saw The Young Bucks attempt to exploit Steen's knee injury. The Young Bucks won the match following a series of superkicks to Steen to pin him. After the match, Steen then thanked several wrestlers in what appeared to be a retirement speech, and embraced Generico, before performing a low blow on him. He then hit Generico with a steel chair, before being stopped by Colt Cabana. During the intermission, a match between CM Punk and Spanky from the Third Anniversary Celebration: Part 1 aired.

The first match after the intermission was a Pick 6 Contenders Series match between Kenny King and Roderick Strong, who was number four in the rankings prior to the match. The match was a back and forth contest, with a notable spot occurring when Strong performed a backbreaker on King on the ring apron. King eventually won the match by utilizing a roll-up while holding onto Strong's ring gear. As a result of the win, King gained the number four ranking in the Pick 6 Contenders Series.

The next match was originally scheduled to be a tag team match between the teams of Rocky Romero and Jack Evans, and Alex Koslov and Teddy Hart, however, due to the blizzard, Evans and Hart were late to the event. As a result, Romero and Koslov competed in singles competition against each other instead, but during the match the fans in attendance chanted "we want Teddy" and "Jack". The ending to the match was botched, as the bell rang before Koslov submitted to Romero's armbar hold, however, Romero was still credited with the submission victory.

=== Main event matches ===
The first championship match of the show followed, as The American Wolves (Davey Richards and Eddie Edwards) defended the ROH World Tag Team Championship against the Briscoe Brothers (Jay and Mark). The Briscoes took the advantage early on, but this ended when Edwards faked an arm injury, based on the broken elbow from which he had just returned, and the Wolves began double-teaming Jay. After about 20 minutes, the Wolves applied simultaneous submission holds, but the Briscoes were able to counter them. The Briscoes won the match by pinfall shortly afterwards by performing a doomsday device on Edwards. This win made the Briscoe Brothers a record six-time tag team champions.

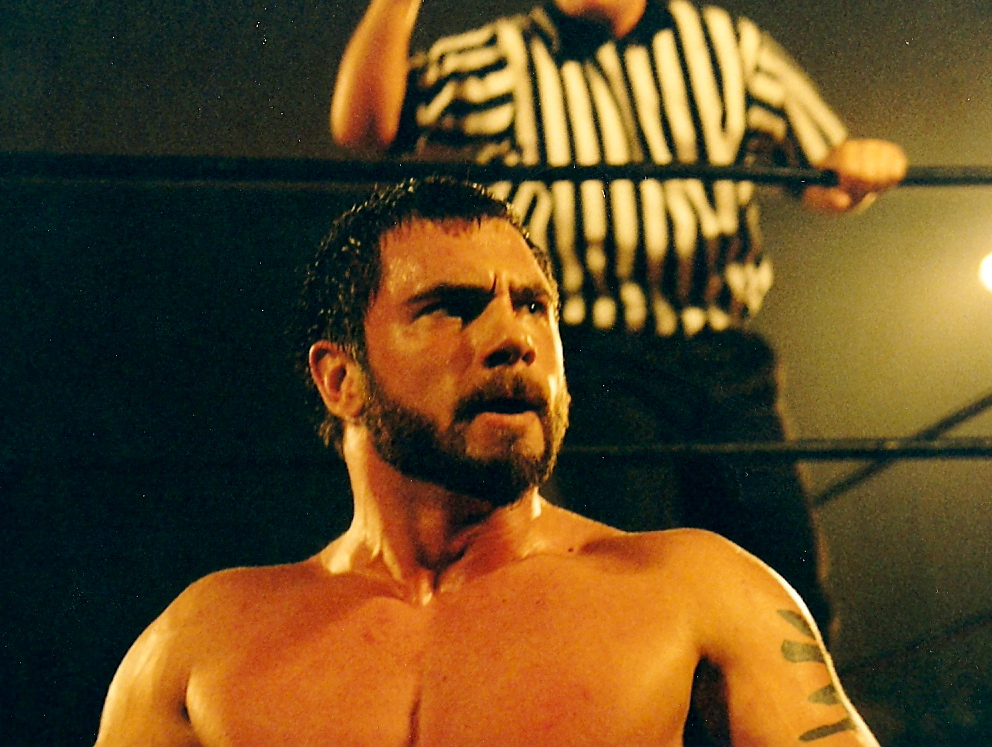
Austin Aries defended the ROH World Championship against Tyler Black

Immediately following the tag team match, Claudio Castagnoli walked down to ringside, and was quickly joined by Chris Hero, who came from the crowd. Castagnoli and Hero attacked the Briscoes and posed with the ROH World Tag Team Championship in an apparent reunion of their former tag team, The Kings of Wrestling. Teddy Hart and Jack Evans, accompanied by Julius Smokes, then made an appearance and, after cutting a promo, they had an impromptu unsanctioned match, with Smokes as the referee. Evans won the match after performing a 630° senton on Hart.

The main event of the show was for the ROH World Championship, between the defending champion, Austin Aries, and the challenger, Tyler Black. The match was based around Aries constantly trying to escape from Black, and lose by countout, which would have meant that Aries retained the championship. When Black refused to let him leave and brought him back to the ring on multiple occasions, Aries attempted to get disqualified by performing a low blow on Black and threatening to hit the referee. The match ended in a 60-minute time-limit draw. Afterwards the two men continued to fight, until they were interrupted by a brawl between the Kings of Wrestling and The Briscoe Brothers, which began in the crowd, and ended in the ring. After Aries, Castagnoli and Hero fled the ringside area, Black and the Briscoes posed in the ring to end the show.

== Reception ==
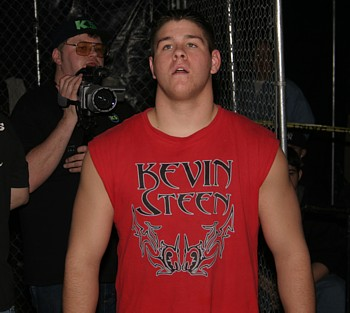
Kevin Steen garnered praise for his match

Overall, the pay-per-view was well received. Writing for the Pro Wrestling Torch, Sean Radican praised the main event between Aries and Black, awarding it four and a half stars out of five. He awarded the ROH World Tag Team Championship match four and a quarter stars out of five, calling it an "awesome match". He also praised the Steen and Generico-Young Bucks match, awarding it four and a half stars as well, and singled out Steen for praise, saying he was "great here selling the story of his knee injury". In his review, Michael Campbell of the Wrestling Observer also praised Steen's contribution to the show, saying he "put in an outstanding shift" and said the match was a "really superb tag" team match. He touted Sweeney's return, saying it gave the show a "real feel-good factor", and praised the "crisp, at times cutting edge duos sequences" on show in the American Wolves-Briscoes match.

Campbell, however, criticized the live crowd at the show, saying it was the "worst NYC crowd" he could remember seeing at an ROH show. Campbell felt the botched ending of the Koslov-Romero match detracted from the event, calling it "ridiculously amateurish". All the reviewers criticized the sound production for the event. Radican claimed it was hard to hear the video packages on the internet feed due to the noise of the live crowd, and also experienced sound difficulties with the intermission match. Campbell agreed, saying the sound for the Black video promo was "abysmal", and remarking that the audio issues made the show seem "very unprofessional". ROH later said that the sound problems were due to GFL's equipment not functioning as it had during run-throughs earlier in the day.

In April 2010, ROH reported that Final Battle 2009 received 1,200 buys and earned US$18,000, not counting live event ticket or merchandise sales. ROH split the revenue with GoFightLive, and so received approximately $9,000. ROH reported that the pay-per-view cost approximately $1,500 to air, and so they earned approximately $7,500 profit for the event.

== Results ==
No.	Results	Stipulations	Times
1^{D}	Andy Ridge defeated Alex Payne	Singles match	02:48
2	Claudio Castagnoli (with Mr. Ernesto Osiris and Prince Nana) defeated Colt Cabana, Kenny Omega and Rhett Titus	Four-Corner Survival match in the Pick 6 Contenders Series	06:10
3	The Embassy (Bison Smith and Erick Stevens) (with Mr. Ernesto Osiris and Prince Nana) defeated Bobby Dempsey and Delirious (with Daizee Haze)	Tag team match	10:12
4	Eddie Kingston defeated Chris Hero (with Sara Del Rey and Shane Hagadorn)	Fight Without Honor	15:00
5	The Young Bucks (Matt Jackson and Nick Jackson) defeated Kevin Steen and El Generico	Tag team match	17:11
6	Kenny King defeated Roderick Strong	Singles match in the Pick 6 Contenders Series	10:33
7	Rocky Romero defeated Alex Koslov by submission	Singles match	11:24
8	The Briscoe Brothers (Jay Briscoe and Mark Briscoe) defeated The American Wolves (Davey Richards and Eddie Edwards) (c) (with Shane Hagadorn)	Tag team match for the ROH World Tag Team Championship	22:50
9	Jack Evans defeated Teddy Hart	Unsanctioned match with Julius Smokes as the special guest referee	05:31
10	Austin Aries (c) vs. Tyler Black ended in a time-limit draw	Singles match for the ROH World Championship	60:00
(c) / – the champion(s) heading into the match; D / – this was a dark match

== See also ==
- 2009 in professional wrestling
- List of Ring of Honor pay-per-view events
