= Final Battle =

- ROH Final Battle logo
- Promotions: Ring of Honor
- First event: 2002

Final Battle is a professional wrestling event, held annually by the Ring of Honor promotion. The event was initially held in 2002.

It is held in December, and is the promotion's last show of the calendar year. The 2009 edition of the show was ROH's first internet pay-per-view, and the first ROH show to be broadcast live. The 2010 edition and the 2011 edition were also broadcast live via the internet. Between 2006 and 2014, every event was held at either the Grand Ballroom or the Hammerstein Ballroom of the Manhattan Center in New York City. Final Battle has since become Ring of Honor's premiere flagship event, similar to WWE's WrestleMania.

== Dates and venues ==
Event	Date	Venue	Location	Main event	Ref.
Final Battle 2002	December 28, 2002	Murphy Recreation Center	Philadelphia, Pennsylvania	Bryan Danielson vs. Low Ki vs. Samoa Joe vs. Steve Corino in a four-way match for the Number One Contender's Trophy	
Final Battle 2003	December 27, 2003	The Prophecy (Christopher Daniels and Dan Maff) vs. The Great Muta and Arashi	Philadelphia, Pennsylvania		
Final Battle 2004	December 26, 2004	Samoa Joe (c) vs. Austin Aries for the ROH World Championship	Philadelphia, Pennsylvania		
Final Battle 2005	December 17, 2005	Inman Sports Center	Edison, New Jersey	Kenta (c) vs. Low Ki for the GHC Junior Heavyweight Championship	
Final Battle 2006	December 23, 2006	Manhattan Center	Manhattan, New York City, New York	Bryan Danielson (c) vs. Homicide for the ROH World Championship	
Final Battle 2007	December 30, 2007	Manhattan Center	Manhattan, New York City, New York	The Briscoe Brothers (Jay Briscoe and Mark Briscoe) (c) vs. The Age of the Fall (Jimmy Jacobs and Tyler Black) for the ROH World Tag Team Championship	
Final Battle 2008	December 27, 2008	Hammerstein Ballroom	Manhattan, New York City, New York	Bryan Danielson vs. Takeshi Morishima in a Fight Without Honor	
Final Battle 2009	December 19, 2009	Manhattan Center	Manhattan, New York City, New York	Austin Aries (c) vs. Tyler Black for the ROH World Championship	
Final Battle 2010	December 18, 2010	Manhattan Center	Manhattan, New York City, New York	El Generico vs. Kevin Steen in an unsanctioned Fight Without Honor for Generico's mask or Steen's ROH career	
Final Battle 2011	December 23, 2011	Hammerstein Ballroom	Manhattan, New York City, New York	Davey Richards (c) vs. Eddie Edwards (with Dan Severn) for the ROH World Championship	
Final Battle 2012: Doomsday	December 16, 2012	Hammerstein Ballroom	Manhattan, New York City, New York	Kevin Steen (c) vs. El Generico in Ladder War IV for the ROH World Championship	
Final Battle 2013	December 14, 2013	Hammerstein Ballroom	Manhattan, New York City, New York	Adam Cole (c) vs. Michael Elgin vs. Jay Briscoe in a Three-way match for the ROH World Championship	
Final Battle 2014	December 7, 2014	Terminal 5	Manhattan, New York City, New York	Jay Briscoe (c) vs. Adam Cole in a Fight Without Honor for the ROH World Championship	
Final Battle (2015)	December 18, 2015	2300 Arena	Philadelphia, Pennsylvania	Jay Lethal (c) vs A.J. Styles for the ROH World Championship	
Final Battle (2016)	December 2, 2016	Hammerstein Ballroom	Manhattan, New York City, New York	Adam Cole (c) vs. Kyle O'Reilly for the ROH World Championship	
Final Battle (2017)	December 15, 2017	Hammerstein Ballroom	Manhattan, New York City, New York	Cody (c) vs Dalton Castle for the ROH World Championship	
Final Battle (2018)	December 14, 2018	Hammerstein Ballroom	Manhattan, New York City, New York	SoCal Uncensored (Frankie Kazarian and Scorpio Sky) (c) vs. The Briscoes (Jay Briscoe and Mark Briscoe) vs. The Young Bucks (Matt Jackson and Nick Jackson) in Ladder War VII for the ROH World Tag Team Championship	
Final Battle (2019)	December 13, 2019	UMBC Event Center	Baltimore, Maryland (Note: While the event was billed as taking place in Baltimore, and the venue has a Baltimore mailing address, the venue is actually located outside the city limits in the community of Catonsville.)	Rush (c) vs. PCO for the ROH World Championship	
Final Battle (2020)	December 18, 2020	UMBC Event Center	Baltimore, Maryland	Rush (c) vs. Brody King for the ROH World Championship	
Final Battle (2021)	December 11, 2021	Chesapeake Employers Insurance Arena (Note: Previously known as UMBC Event Center; the venue name was changed in April 2021.)	Baltimore, Maryland	Jonathan Gresham vs. Jay Lethal for the vacant ROH World Championship	
Final Battle (2022)	December 10, 2022	College Park Center	Arlington, Texas	Chris Jericho (c) vs. Claudio Castagnoli for the ROH World Championship	
Final Battle (2023)	December 15, 2023	Curtis Culwell Center	Garland, Texas	Athena (c) vs. Billie Starkz for the ROH Women's World Championship	
Final Battle (2024)	December 20, 2024	Hammerstein Ballroom	Midtown Manhattan, New York City	Athena (c) vs. Billie Starkz for the ROH Women's World Championship	
Final Battle (2025)	December 5, 2025	Greater Columbus Convention Center	Columbus, Ohio	Athena (c) vs. Persephone for the ROH Women's World Championship	
Final Battle (2026)	December 4, 2026	Boeing Center at Tech Port	San Antonio, Texas	TBA	
(c) – refers to the champion(s) heading into the match

== See also ==
- List of Ring of Honor pay-per-view and livestreaming events
