= Final Battle 2004 =

2004 Ring of Honor event

- Promotion: Ring of Honor
- Date: December 26, 2004
- City: Philadelphia, Pennsylvania
- Venue: Pennsylvania National Guard Armory
- Attendance: 700

Pay-per-view chronology
| ← Previous; Survival of the Fittest | Next → It All Begins |

Final Battle chronology
| ← Previous; 2003 | Next → 2005 |

Final Battle 2004 was the fourth Final Battle and major professional wrestling event produced by Ring of Honor (ROH). It took place on December 26, 2004 from the Pennsylvania National Guard Armory in Philadelphia, Pennsylvania.

This was the fourth annual event in the Final Battle chronology, with the first taking place in 2002.

== Production ==
=== Storylines ===
Other on-screen personnel
| Role | Name |
|---|---|
| Commentators | Jimmy Bower |
| Commentators | CM Punk |

Final Battle 2004 featured ten different professional wrestling matches that involved different wrestlers from pre-existing scripted feuds and storylines. Wrestlers were portrayed as either villains or heroes in the scripted events that built tension and culminated in a wrestling match involving.

The shows main event is Samoa Joe vs. Austin Aries for the ROH World Championship.

=== Background ===
It was also the fourth Final Battle event in Ring of Honor history.

== Results ==
| No. | Results | Stipulations | Times |
|---|---|---|---|
| 1 | Jimmy Jacobs defeated Trent Acid | Singles match | 6:01 |
| 2 | Deranged & Lacey defeated Angel Dust & Becky Bayless | Mixed tag team match | 7:39 |
| 3 | Rockin’ Rebel defeated Devon Moore | Singles match | 4:24 |
| 4 | Homicide (with Julius Smokes) defeated Josh Daniels | Singles match | 11:20 |
| 5 | John Walters (c) defeated Jimmy Rave (with Diablo Santiago, Oman Tortuga & Prince Nana) | Singles match for the ROH Pure Championship | 11:31 |
| 6 | BJ Whitmer & Dan Maff (with Ricky Steamboat) defeated The Carnage Crew (DeVito & Loc) (witg Mick Foley) | Fight Without Honor Tag team match | 16:42 |
| 7 | Jay Lethal defeated defeated The Weapon Of Mask Destruction #2 (El Generico) (with Prince Nana) | Singles match | 6:32 |
| 8 | CM Punk & Steve Corino (with Tracy Brooks) defeated Generation Next (Alex Shelley & Roderick Strong) | Tag team match | 17:32 |
| 9 | Bryan Danielson defeated Low Ki via disqualification | Singles match | 20:57 |
| 10 | Austin Aries defeated Samoa Joe (c) | Singles match for the ROH World Championship | 17:33 |
(c) / – the champion(s) heading into the match

== See also ==
- List of Ring of Honor special events
- List of Ring of Honor pay-per-view events
