= Final Battle 2005 =

2005 Ring of Honor event

- Promotion: Ring of Honor
- Date: December 17, 2005
- City: Edison, New Jersey
- Venue: Inman Sports Club
- Attendance: 600

Pay-per-view chronology
← Previous; Showdown in Motown	Next → Unified

Final Battle chronology
← Previous; 2004	Next → 2006

Final Battle 2005 was the fourth Final Battle and major professional wrestling event produced by Ring of Honor (ROH). It took place on December 17, 2005 at the Inman Sports Club in Edison, New Jersey.

This was the fifth annual event in the Final Battle chronology. The first took place in 2002.

== Production ==
=== Storylines ===
Other on-screen personnel
Role	Name
Commentators	Dave Prazak
Commentators	Lenny Leonard

Final Battle 2005 featured twelve matches pursuing pre-existing scripted feuds and storylines. Wrestlers were portrayed as either villains or heroes in the scripted events that built tension.

The show's main event was KENTA vs. Low Ki (with Ricky Reyes) for the GHC Junior Heavyweight Championship.

=== Background ===
It was the fifth Final Battle event in Ring of Honor history.

== Results ==
No.	Results	Stipulations	Times
1^{D}	Mitch Franklin & Smash Bradley defeated Bobby Dempsey & Derek Dempsey	Tag team match	—
2^{D}	Pelle Primeau defeated Shane Hagadorn	Singles match	—
3	Jimmy Rave (with Prince Nana) defeated Milano Collection AT	Singles match	12:44
4	Colt Cabana defeated Azrieal	Singles match	7:18
5	Nigel McGuinness (c) defeated Claudio Castagnoli by disqualification	Singles match for the ROH Pure Championship	14:36
6	BJ Whitmer & Dan Maff (with Ricky Steamboat) defeated The Carnage Crew (DeVito & Loc) (with Mick Foley)	Fight Without Honor Tag team match	16:42
7	Alex Shelley (with Prince Nana) defeated Steve Corino	Singles match	11:04
8	Jay Lethal defeated BJ Whitmer (with Lacey) and Christopher Daniels (with Allison Danger) and Samoa Joe	Four corner survival match	15:01
9	Ricky Reyes (with Julius Smokes) defeated Davey Andrews	Singles match	2:19
10	Generation Next (Austin Aries & Roderick Strong) defeated Sal Rinauro & Tony Mamaluke (c)	Tag team match for the ROH Tag Team Championship	18:18
11	Bryan Danielson (c) defeated Naomichi Marufuji	Singles match for the ROH World Championship	23:42
12	KENTA (c) defeated Low Ki (with Ricky Reyes)	Singles match for the GHC Junior Heavyweight Championship	24:56
(c) / – the champion(s) heading into the match; D / – this was a dark match

== See also ==
- List of Ring of Honor special events
- List of Ring of Honor pay-per-view events
