= Final Battle (2025) =

2025 Ring of Honor professional wrestling event

- Promotional poster featuring various ROH and AEW wrestlers
- Promotion: Ring of Honor
- Date: December 5, 2025
- City: Columbus, Ohio
- Venue: Greater Columbus Convention Center
- Attendance: 1,200

Event chronology
← Previous; DEAN~!!! 3	Next → Global Wars United Kingdom

Final Battle chronology
← Previous; 2024	Next → 2026

The 2025 Final Battle was a professional wrestling live streaming event produced by American promotion Ring of Honor (ROH). It was the 24th Final Battle event and took place on Friday, December 5, 2025, as a part of GalaxyCon at the Greater Columbus Convention Center in Columbus, Ohio. The event aired exclusively on ROH's streaming service, Honor Club.

Fourteen matches were contested at the event, including three on the Zero-Hour pre-show. In the event's final match, which was promoted as part of a double main event, Athena defeated Persephone to retain the ROH Women's World Championship. The second main event, which was the penultimate match, saw Bandido last eliminate Hechicero in a Survival of the Fittest match to retain the ROH World Championship. In other prominent matches, Red Velvet defeated Mercedes Moné to win the ROH Women's World Television Championship, Lee Moriarty defeated Nigel McGuinness 5—4 after overtime in a 30-minute Iron man match, and Deonna Purrazzo defeated Billie Starkz to become the inaugural ROH Women's Pure Champion.

== Production ==
=== Background ===
Final Battle is a professional wrestling event produced by Ring of Honor. First held in 2002, it is traditionally ROH's last show in the calendar year. It is widely regarded as Ring of Honor's premiere flagship event, similar to WWE's WrestleMania. On August 11, 2025, ROH announced that the 2025 Final Battle would be held at the Greater Columbus Convention Center in Columbus, Ohio on December 5, as part of a partnership with GalaxyCon Columbus, and would air exclusively on Honor Club.

=== Storylines ===
The event featured professional wrestling matches that involved different wrestlers from pre-existing scripted feuds and storylines. Wrestlers portrayed villains, heroes, or less distinguishable characters in scripted events that build tension and culminated in a wrestling match or series of matches. Storylines were produced on ROH's weekly series ROH Honor Club TV exclusively on their streaming service Honor Club, on television programs of sister promotion All Elite Wrestling including Dynamite and Collision, and via promotional videos on both the ROH and AEW YouTube channels.

One of the main features of Final Battle would be the finals of the ROH Women's Pure Championship tournament. First introduced following the April 12 episode of AEW Collision, the title tournament was originally meant to culminate at Supercard of Honor, but had to be postponed due to injuries, according to Tony Khan. The tournament bracket was officially revealed on August 29, hours before Death Before Dishonor, and would officially begin that night before continuing across several episodes of ROH Honor Club TV. On the December 4 episode, Billie Starkz would defeat Yuka Sakazaki to advance to the tournament final. Meanwhile, during the media call for Final Battle, Tony Khan announced that Queen Aminata, who had previously suffered a neck injury, would be medically unfit to continue in the tournament. As such, her scheduled opponent, Deonna Purrazzo, earned a bye to the final, meaning she would face Starkz at Final Battle to determine the inaugural champion.

When Tony Khan introduced the AEW National Championship, he declared that it would be defended across multiple promotions, including ROH. Thus, on November 6, it was announced that the title would have its first defense at Final Battle, which would be the first time an AEW championship would be contested for on ROH programming. The inaugural National Champion was determined at Full Gear in a Casino Gauntlet match, where Ricochet pinned Kevin Knight to win the title. On the subsequent episode of AEW Collision, after Dalton Castle and The Outrunners (Truth Magnum and Turbo Floyd) had a match, Ricochet and the Gates of Agony (Bishop Kaun and Toa Liona) came out and attacked the three, with Ricochet claiming more time should've been allocated for his title celebration. Afterwards, it was announced that Ricochet would officially defend the National Championship at Final Battle. His challenger was determined to be Castle on the December 2 special episode of ROH Honor Club TV.

On the November 27 AEW Collision, Tony Khan announced that Rush was originally scheduled to challenge Bandido for the ROH World Championship, a rematch from when Bandido first won the title by defeating Rush at 2021's Best in the World. However, it was determined that Rush would be out of action with a knee injury, meaning he would be unable to compete at Final Battle. As a result, Bandido would instead defend the title in a Survival of the Fittest match against Blake Christian, Hechicero, Komander, and Rush's La Facción Ingobernable (LFI) stablemates Sammy Guevara and The Beast Mortos. Rush and Guevara also held the ROH World Tag Team Championship, but due to Rush's injury, the titles were vacated. Thus, Guevara and Mortos, representing LFI, would also face the team of Adam Priest and Tommy Billington for the titles at Final Battle.

At the previous year's Final Battle, Nigel McGuinness answered an open challenge for Lee Moriarty's ROH Pure Championship, but was unable to win the title. Eight months later on AEW Collision, McGuinness and Moriarty were involved in a four-way match for which the winner earned an IWGP World Heavyweight Championship match at Forbidden Door. McGuinness would win that match by submitting Moriarty. On the November 28 "Black Friday" edition of ROH Honor Club TV, McGuinness spoke backstage about wanting to settle the score with Moriarty, and thus, challenged him to a non-title 30-minute Iron Man match at Final Battle.

Lineal ROH Women's World Television Champion Red Velvet was scheduled to defend the title at Supercard of Honor, but due to mounting injuries, was unable to compete. An interim champion would be determined that night, with Mina Shirakawa winning a four-way match to win the title. However, at WrestleDream, Shirakawa lost the interim title to AEW TBS Champion Mercedes Moné in a Winner Takes All match. Moné would soon become the undisputed champion after she defeated the lineal champion Velvet in a unification match on the November 19 combined broadcast of AEW Dynamite and Collision. On November 27, Velvet called out Moné for not appearing on ROH Honor Club TV since winning the title, and enacted her rematch clause for Final Battle, which was made official.

== Results ==
No.	Results	Stipulations	Times
1^{P}	The Outrunners (Turbo Floyd and Truth Magnum) defeated Premier Athletes (Tony Nese and Ariya Daivari) (with "Smart" Mark Sterling and Stori Denali) by pinfall	Tag team match	9:12
2^{P}	Leila Grey (with Christopher Daniels) defeated Zayda Steel by pinfall	Singles match	6:33
3^{P}	Ace Austin defeated Lee Johnson by pinfall	Singles match	9:30
4^{P}	Death Riders (Wheeler Yuta and Daniel Garcia) (with Jon Moxley) defeated Grizzled Young Veterans (Zack Gibson and James Drake) by pinfall	Tag team match	10:06
5	Deonna Purrazzo defeated Billie Starkz by submission	Pure Wrestling Rules tournament final for the inaugural ROH Women's Pure Championship	13:51
6	Lee Moriarty (with Shane Taylor) defeated Nigel McGuinness 5–4 in sudden death overtime	30-minute Iron Man match	31:58
7	Red Velvet defeated Mercedes Moné (c) by pinfall	Singles match for the ROH Women's World Television Championship	13:46
8	La Facción Ingobernable (Sammy Guevara and The Beast Mortos) defeated Tommy Billington and Adam Priest by pinfall	Tag team match for the vacant ROH World Tag Team Championship	13:09
9	Eddie Kingston defeated Josh Woods (with "Smart" Mark Sterling) by pinfall	Singles match	9:43
10	Shane Taylor Promotions (Shane Taylor, Carlie Bravo, and Capt. Shawn Dean) (c) (with Anthony Ogogo and Trish Adora) defeated SkyFlight (Scorpio Sky, Dante Martin, and Darius Martin) (with Christopher Daniels and Leila Grey) by pinfall	Six-man tag team match for the ROH World Six-Man Tag Team Championship	11:29
11	Ricochet (c) defeated Dalton Castle (with Turbo Floyd and Truth Magnum) by pinfall	Singles match for the AEW National Championship	14:56
12	Bandido (c) defeated Sammy Guevara, Blake Christian, The Beast Mortos, Komander, and Hechicero by pinfall	Survival of the Fittest match for the ROH World Championship	27:54
13	Athena (c) (with Diamanté) defeated Persephone by pinfall	Singles match for the ROH Women's World Championship	27:07
(c) / – the champion(s) heading into the match; P / – the match was broadcast on the pre-show

=== ROH Women's Pure Championship Tournament bracket ===
Quarterfinals; Death Before Dishonor; August 29, 2025; Ring of Honor Wrestling; September 25, 2025 – November 28, 2025
Taya Valkyrie	8:24
Queen Aminata	Pinfall
Deonna Purrazzo	Submission
Trish Adora	7:02
Billie Starkz	Pinfall
Olympia	10:46
Serena Deeb	10:31
Yuka Sakazaki	Pinfall

Semifinals; Ring of Honor Wrestling; December 4, 2025
Queen Aminata	Forfeit
Deonna Purrazzo	Bye^{1}
Billie Starkz	Pinfall
Yuka Sakazaki	10:43

Final; Final Battle; December 5, 2025
Deonna Purrazzo	Submission
Billie Starkz	13:51

1 Aminata forfeited her semifinal match to Purrazzo due to a neck injury.

=== Iron Man match ===
Score		Point winner	Decision	Notes	Time
Moriarty	McGuinness	Point winner	Decision	Notes	Time
1	0	Lee Moriarty	Submission	Moriarty submitted McGuinness to the Border City Stretch	3:47
2	0	Lee Moriarty	Pinfall	Moriarty pinned McGuinness with a small package	10:55
2	1	Nigel McGuinness	Submission	McGuinness submitted Moriarty to the London Dungeon	19:05
3	1	Lee Moriarty	Pinfall	Moriarty pinned McGuinness with a roll-up	19:48
3	2	Nigel McGuinness	Pinfall	McGuinness pinned Moriarty with a cradle	28:10
3	3	Nigel McGuinness	Pinfall	McGuinness pinned Moriarty with a schoolboy	29:30
3	4	Nigel McGuinness	Pinfall	McGuinness pinned Moriarty with a schoolboy while holding his tights	29:48
4	4	Lee Moriarty	Pinfall	Moriarty pinned McGuinness after Shane Taylor punched him	30:00
5	4	Lee Moriarty	Pinfall	Moriarty pinned McGuinness with a bridge.	31:59

=== ROH World Championship Survival of the Fittest match ===
Eliminated	Wrestler	Eliminated by	Method	Time
1	Sammy Guevara	Komander	Pinned after Cielito Lindo	11:24
2	The Beast Mortos	Hechicero	Pinned after a headscissors driver	13:00
3	Komander	Blake Christian	Pinned after the Lethal Injection	15:24
4	Blake Christian	Bandido	Pinned with a sunset flip	20:38
5	Hechicero	Bandido	Pinned after a poison rana	27:53
Winner	Bandido (c)	—N/a		27:53

== See also ==
- 2025 in professional wrestling
- List of Ring of Honor pay-per-view events
