= Final Battle 2006 =

2006 Ring of Honor event

- Promotion: Ring of Honor
- Date: December 23, 2006
- City: New York, New York
- Venue: Manhattan Center
- Attendance: 2,500

Event chronology
| ← Previous — | Next → Dedicated |

Final Battle chronology
| ← Previous; 2005 | Next → 2007 |

Final Battle 2006 was the 5th Final Battle major professional wrestling event produced by Ring of Honor (ROH). It took place on December 23, 2006 from the Manhattan Center in New York City.

It was the fourth annual event in the Final Battle chronology, with the first taking place in 2002.

The shows main event featured New York’s own Homicide challenge Bryan Danielson for the ROH World Championship, with Homicide vowing to leave ROH forever if he failed to win the title.

== Production ==
Other on-screen personnel
| Role | Name |
|---|---|
| Commentators | Dave Prazak |
| Commentators | Lenny Leonard |
| Commentators | Nigel McGuinness |

=== Background ===
Final Battle featured seven professional wrestling matches that involved different wrestlers from pre-existing scripted feuds and storylines. Wrestlers were portrayed as either villains or heroes in the scripted events that built tension and culminated in a wrestling match.

== Results ==
| No. | Results | Stipulations | Times |
|---|---|---|---|
| 1 | Jimmy Rave defeated Christopher Daniels, Davey Richards and El Generico | Four corner survival match | 17:46 |
| 2 | Adam Pearce (with Shane Hagadorn) defeated Ricky Reyes (with Julius Smokes) | Singles match | 3:22 |
| 3 | Brent Albright and Jimmy Jacobs defeated B. J. Whitmer and Colt Cabana (with Daizee Haze) | Tag team match | 13:49 |
| 4 | The Briscoe Brothers (Jay Briscoe and Mark Briscoe) defeated The Kings of Wrestling (Chris Hero and Claudio Castagnoli) (with Larry Sweeney) | Tag team match | 17:13 |
| 5 | Jimmy Rave defeated Nigel McGuinness | Singles match | 16:57 |
| 6 | Cima, Matt Sydal and Shingo defeated Austin Aries, Delirious and Roderick Strong | Six-man tag team match | 24:01 |
| 7 | Homicide (with Julius Smokes) defeated Bryan Danielson (c) | Singles match for the ROH World Championship | 30:36 |
(c) / – the champion(s) heading into the match

== See also ==
- List of Ring of Honor pay-per-view events
