= Final Battle 2008 =

2008 Ring of Honor event

- Promotion: Ring of Honor
- Date: December 27, 2008
- City: New York City, New York
- Venue: Hammerstein Ballroom
- Attendance: 2,500

Event chronology
← Previous; All-Star Extravaganza IV	Next → Full Circle

Final Battle chronology
← Previous; 2007	Next → 2009

Final Battle 2008 was a professional wrestling event promoted by Ring of Honor. It took place on December 27, 2008 at the Hammerstein Ballroom in New York City, New York.

== Background ==
Other on-screen personnel
Role	Name
Commentators	Dave Prazak
Commentators	Lenny Leonard
Commentators	Nigel McGuinness

=== Storylines ===
Final Battle 2008 featured eight different professional wrestling matches, which involved different wrestlers from pre-existing scripted feuds, plots, and storylines that played out on ROH's television programs prior to the show. Wrestlers portrayed villains or heroes as they followed a series of events that built tension and culminated in a wrestling match or series of matches.

== Results ==
No.	Results	Stipulations	Times
1	Kenny Omega defeated Claudio Castagnoli	Singles match	6:59
2	Jerry Lynn defeated Chris Hero (with Larry Sweeney & Sara Del Rey), Necro Butcher, and Rhett Titus	Four-corner survival match	12:50
3	Kevin Steen and El Generico (c) (with Daizee Haze) defeated The Age of the Fall (Delirious and Jimmy Jacobs)	Tag team match for the ROH World Tag Team Championship	13:39
4	Brent Albright, Erick Stevens and Roderick Strong defeated Sweet 'n' Sour Inc (Davey Richards, Eddie Edwards and Go Shiozaki) (with Larry Sweeney)	Street Fight	14:37
5	The Briscoe Brothers (Jay Briscoe and Mark Briscoe) defeated Katsuhiko Nakajima and Kensuke Sasaki	Tag team match	16:49
6	Austin Aries defeated Tyler Black	Singles match for a #1 Contendership ROH World Championship match	17:09
7	Nigel McGuinness (c) defeated Naomichi Marufuji	Singles match for the ROH World Championship	18:40
8	Bryan Danielson defeated Takeshi Morishima	Fight without Honor	20:50
(c) / – the champion(s) heading into the match

== See also ==
- ROH Final Battle
- List of Ring of Honor pay-per-view events
- 2008 in professional wrestling
