= ROH Women's Pure Championship =

Professional wrestling championship

- The ROH Women's Pure Championship belt design (2023–present)

Details
- Promotion: Ring of Honor
- Date established: April 12, 2025
- Current champion: Deonna Purrazzo
- Date won: December 5, 2025

Other names
- ROH Women's Pure Championship (2025–present); ROH Women's Pure Wrestling Championship
Statistics
- First champion: Deonna Purrazzo

The ROH Women's Pure Championship is a women's professional wrestling championship created and promoted by the American promotion Ring of Honor (ROH). Established on April 12, 2025, it is a specialty title that is contested under "Pure Wrestling Rules". The current champion is Deonna Purrazzo, who became the inaugural champion by defeating Billie Starkz in a tournament final at Final Battle on December 5, 2025.

== History ==
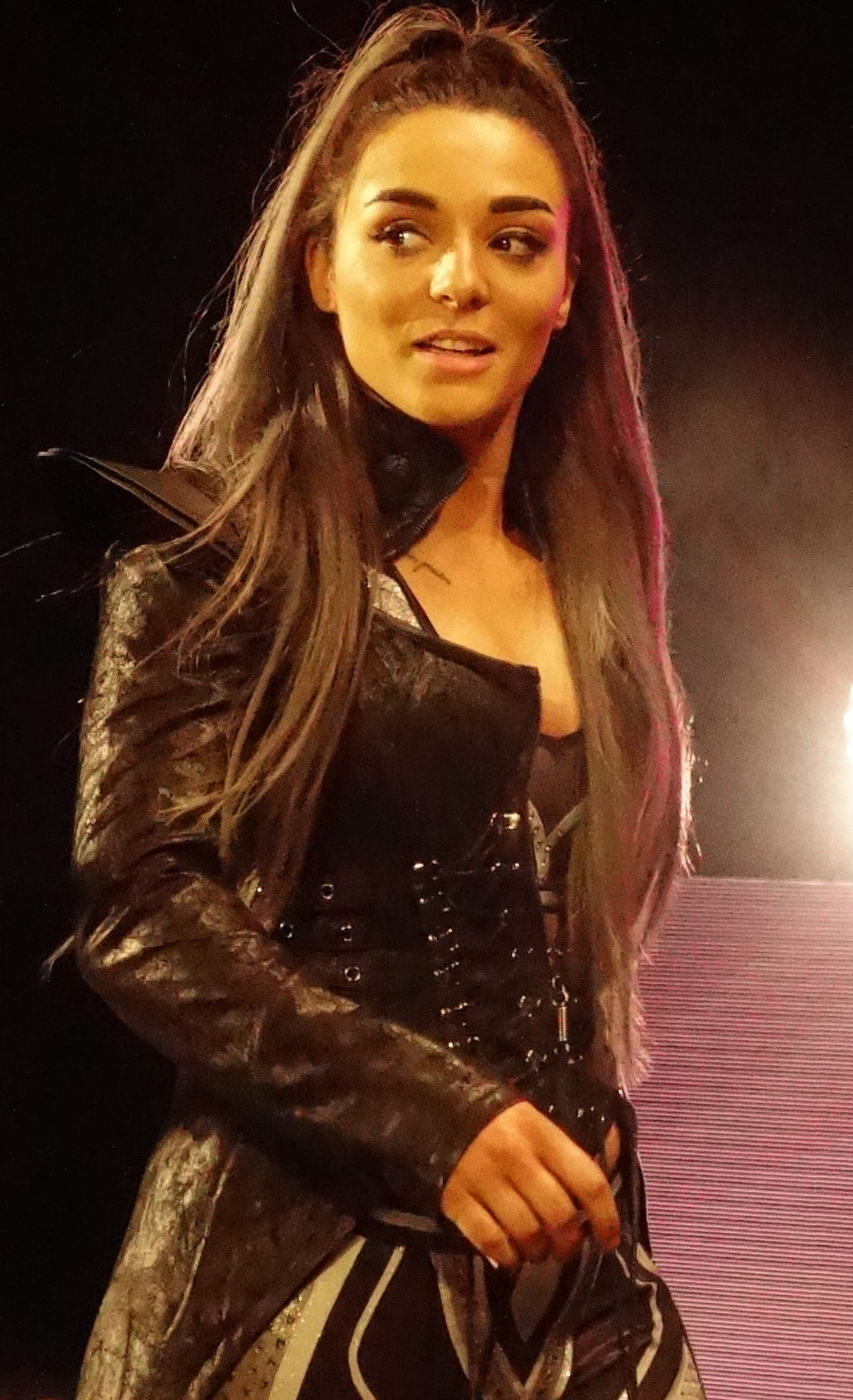
Inaugural champion Deonna Purrazzo.

On April 12, 2025, after sister promotion All Elite Wrestling's (AEW) taping of Saturday Night Collision, Tony Khan introduced the ROH Women's Pure Championship to Ring of Honor (ROH), the women's version of the ROH Pure Championship contested under the same "Pure Wrestling Rules". It was revealed that the inaugural champion would be crowned via a 16-woman single-elimination tournament. It was originally announced that the tournament final for the title would happen at Supercard of Honor, but it was cancelled due to timing issues. On the April 24 episode of Honor Club, it was announced that Queen Aminata and Serena Deeb would face off in the first round of the tournament on The Sit Down with Lexy Nair. Other names later confirmed were Deonna Purrazzo, Taya Valkyrie, and Leila Grey. On May 23, 2025, it was announced that Billie Starkz would also be entering the tournament. At Death Before Dishonor on August 29, 2025, the inaugural tournament bracket was revealed, adding three more participants: Trish Adora, Olympia, and Yuka Sakazaki. On November 6, 2025, it was announced that the tournament final would now take place at Final Battle on December 5, 2025.

On December 4, 2025, it was revealed that Aminata could no longer compete in the tournament due to a neck injury, having Purrazzo advance to the final via forfeit. During the same episode, Starkz advanced to the final by defeating Sakazaki. At Final Battle, Purrazzo defeated Starkz via submission to become the inaugural ROH Women's Pure Champion.

== Inaugural championship tournament ==
Quarterfinals; Death Before Dishonor; August 29, 2025; Ring of Honor Wrestling; September 25, 2025 – November 28, 2025
Taya Valkyrie	8:24
Queen Aminata	Pinfall
Deonna Purrazzo	Submission
Trish Adora	7:02
Billie Starkz	Pinfall
Olympia	10:46
Serena Deeb	10:31
Yuka Sakazaki	Pinfall

Semifinals; Ring of Honor Wrestling; December 4, 2025
Queen Aminata	Forfeit
Deonna Purrazzo	Bye^{1}
Billie Starkz	Pinfall
Yuka Sakazaki	10:43

Final; Final Battle; December 5, 2025
Deonna Purrazzo	Submission
Billie Starkz	13:51

1 Aminata forfeited her semifinal match to Purrazzo due to a neck injury.

== Pure wrestling rules ==
- Matches for the ROH Women's Pure Championship are conducted under the same "Pure Wrestling Rules" of the men's title, which as of 2023, the rules are as follows:
1. Each wrestler has three rope breaks to stop submission holds and pinfalls.
2. After a wrestler exhausts his rope breaks, submission and pin attempts on or under the ropes by his opponent are considered legal.
3. No closed-fist punches to the face permitted.
4. Open-handed slaps or chops to the face are permitted.
5. Punches to the rest of the body are allowed, excluding low blows.
6. The first use of a closed fist to the face receives a warning.
7. The second use of a closed fist to the face results in disqualification.
8. The title can change hands via disqualification and countout.
9. Outside interference will result in automatic termination from the roster for the wrestler that interferes.
10. If a title match reaches its time limit without a winner being declared, the winner is decided by a panel of three judges.

== Belt design ==
The title design is similar to the 2023 ROH Pure Championship title design introduced on March 31, 2023, that debuted at Supercard of Honor but has the word Women's in the center above the word pure and has ladies wrestling each other on the side plates instead of men.

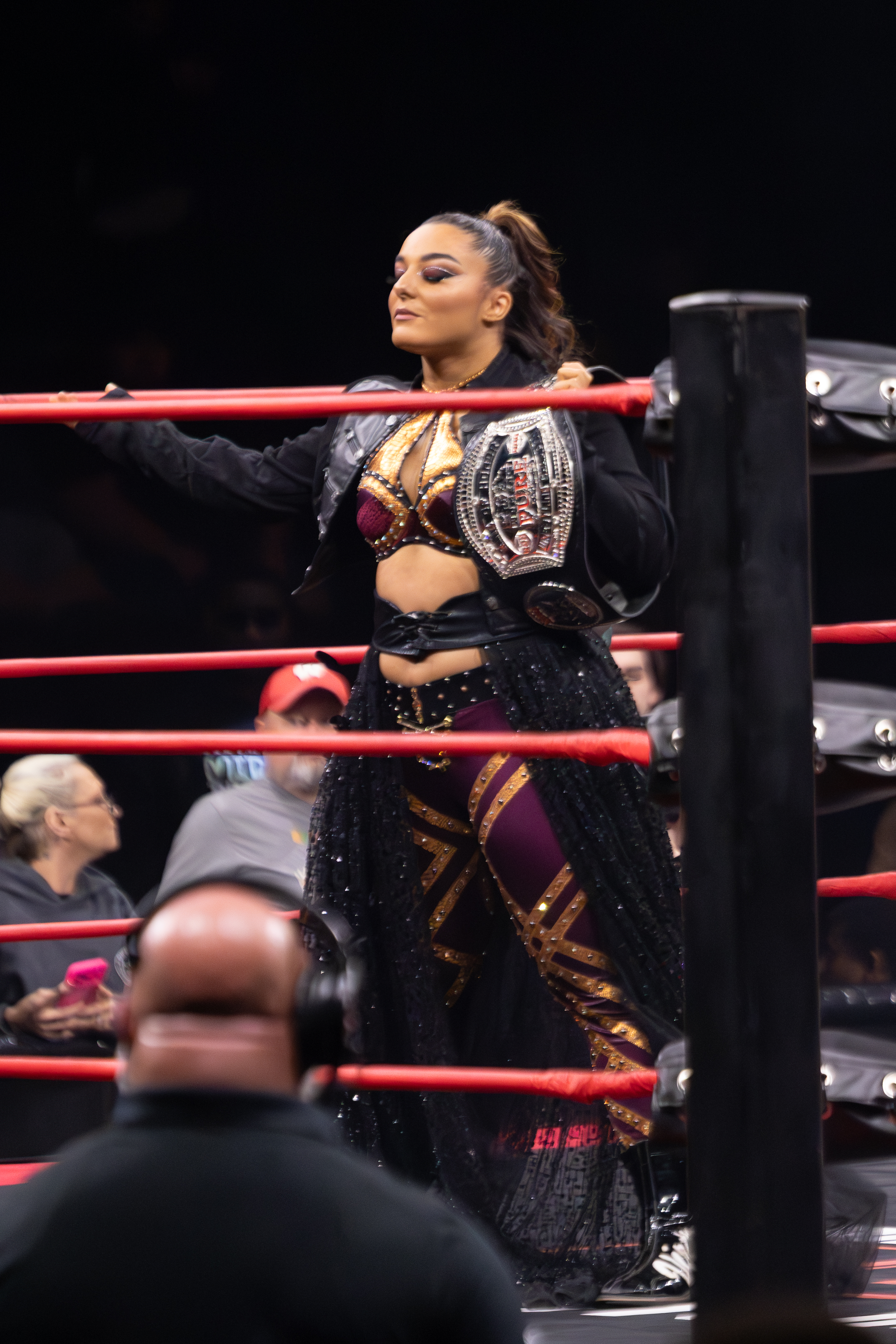
Deonna Purrazzo shown here with the title at Supercard of Honor 2026.

== Reigns ==
As of November 22, 2026, there has been one reign. The current champion is Deonna Purrazzo, who became the inaugural champion by defeating Billie Starkz in a tournament final at Final Battle on December 5, 2025, in Columbus, Ohio.

Key
No.	Overall reign number
Reign	Reign number for the specific champion
Days	Number of days held
+	Current reign is changing daily

No.	Champion	Championship change			Reign statistics		Notes	Ref.
No.	Champion	Date	Event	Location	Reign	Days	Notes	Ref.
Ring of Honor (ROH)
1	Deonna Purrazzo	December 5, 2025	Final Battle	Columbus, OH	1	352+	Defeated Billie Starkz in a tournament final to become the inaugural champion.	

== See also ==
- List of Ring of Honor tournaments
