= Ring of Honor Wrestling =

American professional wrestling television series

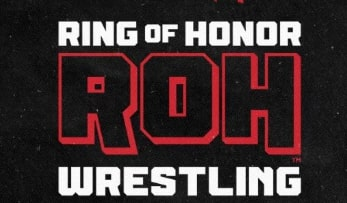
- Logo used since 2023
- Genre: Professional wrestling
- Presented by: Ian Riccaboni (play-by-play commentator); Caprice Coleman (color commentator)
- Starring: ROH roster
- Country of origin: United States
- Original language: English
- No. of seasons: 14
- No. of episodes: 652

Production
- Executive producer: Tony Khan
- Camera setup: Multicamera setup
- Running time: 90 minutes

Original release
- Network: HDNet
- Release: March 21, 2009 – April 4, 2011
- Network: Broadcast syndication via Sinclair stations Destination America (Note: Ring of Honor Wrestling aired on Destination America from June 3, 2015 until November 25, 2015); Other broadcasters
- Release: September 24, 2011 – April 15, 2022
- Network: Honor Club
- Release: March 2, 2023 – present

Related
- AEW Dynamite; AEW Collision

Ring of Honor Wrestling (also known as ROH Honor Club TV, and often shortened as ROH Wrestling TV, ROH TV, ROH TV on HonorClub, or ROH on HonorClub) is an American professional wrestling television series produced by Ring of Honor (ROH). The series features professional wrestlers competing in matches and conducting interviews. Combined, these elements create and further the storylines of the promotion.

The pilot episode was taped on February 28, 2009, and the series premiered on March 21, 2009, airing weekly on HDNet in the United States. The series' 100th and final HDNet episode aired on April 4, 2011.

The series would return under the same title, airing on television stations owned by the Sinclair Broadcast Group on September 24, 2011; many such stations being affiliates of The CW and MyNetworkTV.

Following the acquisition of Ring of Honor by All Elite Wrestling president and co-founder Tony Khan in March 2022, the show eventually ceased broadcasting on Sinclair's stations; the final episode aired on April 15, 2022. Khan later announced in December 2022 that weekly programming would air on the streaming platform Honor Club. The series returned on March 2, 2023.

== History ==
=== Original run (2009–2011) ===
Ring of Honor (ROH) first announced its partnership with HDNet in an article posted to its website on January 26, 2009. The article stated that HDNet would air a weekly ROH television series titled Ring of Honor Wrestling. They subsequently announced their first television tapings would take place at The Arena in Philadelphia, Pennsylvania. Ring of Honor Wrestling began airing weekly on March 21, 2009, on HDNet.

On July 1, 2009, it was reported that Ring of Honor had cancelled television tapings scheduled for July 17 and 18; it was reported to be a decision made by HDNet, and not Ring of Honor. On July 27, 2009, ROH announced that the show would be moving to Monday nights beginning on August 17, with a repeat airing later that night. On February 11, 2010, it was announced that Ring of Honor Wrestling would be airing in Italy on Dahlia TV.

On January 11, 2011, Ring of Honor announced the end of its television series, after the completion of the promotion's two–year contract with HDNet. The show's final tapings took place on January 21 and 22, with the final episode airing on April 4, 2011.

=== Sinclair series (2011–2022) ===
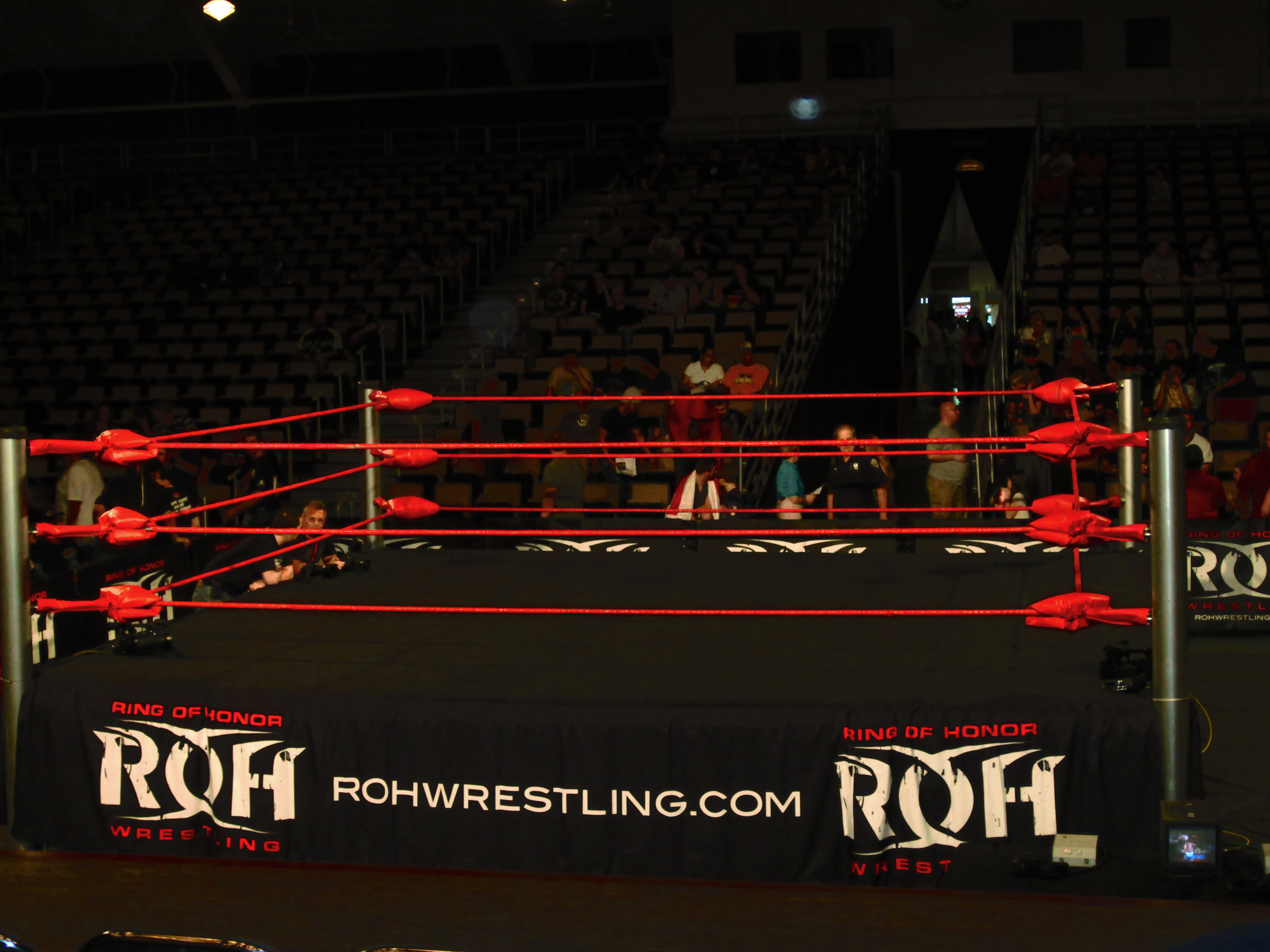
Ring of Honor wrestling ring

On May 21, 2011, the Sinclair Broadcast Group announced that they had purchased ROH, with Cary Silkin remaining with the company in an executive role. Ring of Honor Wrestling began airing in September 2011 over Sinclair stations, mainly in weekend primetime on their CW and MyNetworkTV stations.

On September 9, 2014, ROH announced that Ring of Honor Wrestling would begin being syndicated to stations in non-Sinclair markets, with Gannett Company-owned WATL in Atlanta becoming the first non-Sinclair station to air Ring of Honor Wrestling on September 13, 2014.

On May 27, 2015, ROH announced a 26-week television deal with Destination America, beginning on June 3. The program originally aired twice on Wednesdays; first at 8pm and then a replay at 11pm. However, after struggling to gain viewers, Ring of Honor Wrestling lost their primetime slot in late July and was reduced to a single airing at 11pm. The final episode on Destination America aired on November 25, 2015.

On December 2, 2015, Ring of Honor Wrestling debuted on the Sinclair-owned Comet.

On July 9, 2017, Ring of Honor Wrestling was moved to Charge!. It was also announced that the show would also be streamed through FITE TV, a mobile app that allows streaming through Wi-Fi to a smart TV or a set-top box such as Roku or Chromecast.

Following Sinclair's purchase of the Fox Sports Networks (which were divested by The Walt Disney Company following its acquisition of key assets from 21st Century Fox), Ring of Honor Wrestling began airing on the newly acquired RSN's in November 2019. This brought ROH TV availability in several large markets where Sinclair lacked an over-the-air station.

The show's final episode on Sinclair stations aired on the weekend of April 15, 2022.

=== Honor Club series (2023–present) ===
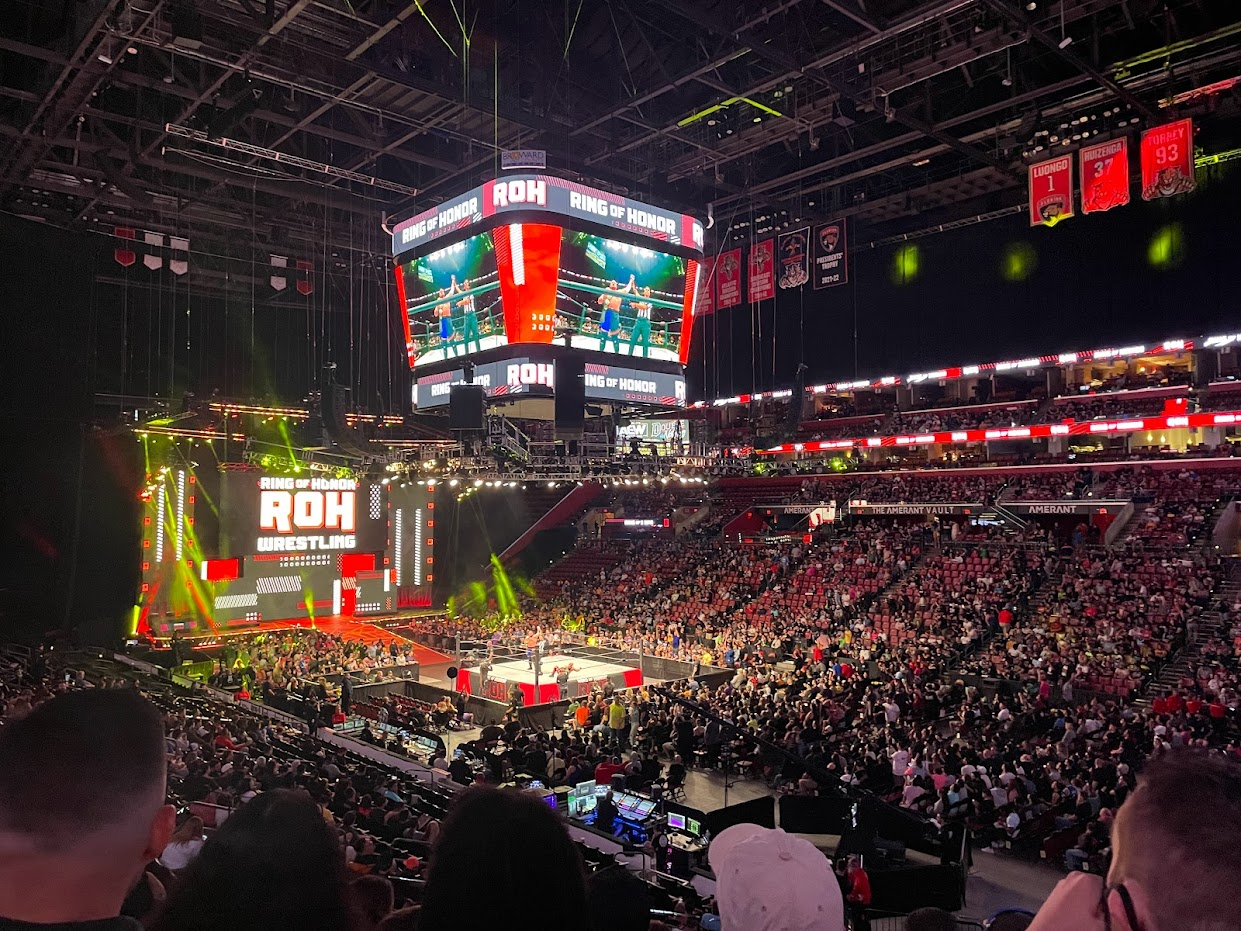
Ring of Honor wrestling night in 2023

In an interview with Busted Open following his purchase of the company, Tony Khan announced plans to relaunch the weekly series. On December 10, 2022, after Final Battle, Khan announced that the program would relaunch on Honor Club, beginning in 2023.

During the December 16, 2023, TV tapings, Tony Khan debuted a new ROH Women's World Television Championship.

== Production ==
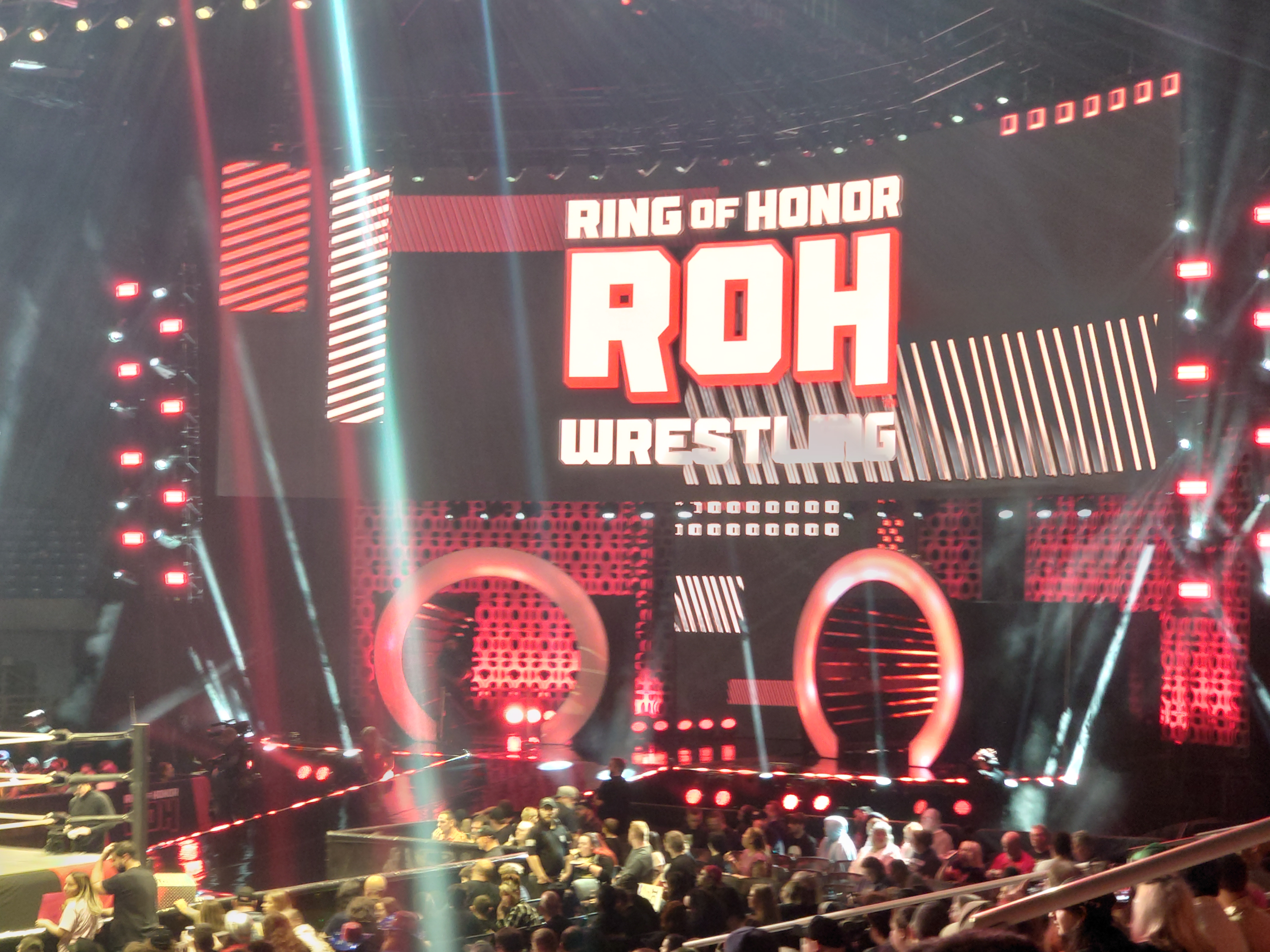
Ring of Honor Wrestling set used since March 2024, in conjunction with tapings of All Elite Wrestling's programs.

=== Episode format ===
An episode typically features matches as well as interviews from the wrestlers regarding their upcoming matches or current storylines. The show typically ends after the main event (the final match on an episode) and goes to a closing graphic.

Beginning in August 2019, the show's format was changed to feature highlights of recent events, with Ian Riccaboni and Quinn McKay hosting from backstage. The show featured one full-length main event match, with the color commentary during the matches themselves varying as Riccaboni is paired with a variety of partners. It was speculated that this revamp was done in order to drive growth for Honor Club, where the promotion had begun to stream its television tapings live.

Upon Ring of Honor's return to promoting events following the 2020 COVID-19 pandemic hiatus, the series format was revamped beginning on the September 12, 2020 episode.

During the promotion's hiatus after Final Battle in December 2021, the show was revamped to focus on archival footage, "Best of" specials, and highlights from recent events.

=== Filming locations ===
All but six episodes of the HDNet run were taped at The Arena in Philadelphia, Pennsylvania. The Arena is frequently used as a professional wrestling venue, and is known prominently for formerly hosting many Extreme Championship Wrestling events.

ROH held television tapings at the Davis Arena in Louisville, Kentucky on December 9 and 10 in 2010.

Beginning in August 2020, after a hiatus due to the COVID-19 pandemic, ROH resumed television tapings from the Chesapeake Employers Insurance Arena (formerly known as the UMBC Event Center) in Maryland.

On February 25 and 26, 2023, the first tapings of the relaunched program were held at Universal Studios Soundstage 19 in Orlando, Florida, the same venue where AEW Dark episodes were taped.

Between June 2023 and February 2026, tapings were held regularly in conjunction with live broadcasts of either AEW Dynamite or Collision depending on the week, with matches being recorded in the venue before and/or after the live AEW broadcasts.

During July and August 2024, Ring of Honor would frequently hold tapings at Esports Stadium Arlington in Arlington, Texas as part of AEW's residency at the venue.

Beginning on March 1, 2026, episodes of the weekly Ring of Honor Wrestling program were taped at WJCT studios in Jacksonville, Florida.

== Special episodes ==
Episode title	Date	Viewers	Note
HDNet (2009–2011)
Best of 2009	December 28, 2009		Featured clips from 2009.
Best of 2010	December 27, 2010		Featured clips from 2010.
Broadcast syndication (2011–2022)
Best of 2011	December 24, 2011 & December 31, 2011		Featured clips from 2011.
Best of 2012	December 22, 2012 & December 29, 2012		Featured clips from 2012.
Life & Times of the Briscoe Brothers	June 22, 2013		Featured clips of the Briscoe Brothers.
Best of ROH Wrestling TV	August 17, 2013		Celebrated Ring of Honor Wrestling's 100th episode as part of the Sinclair Broadcast Group and featured the best matches from the program's history.
Best of Adam Cole	December 21, 2013		Featured clips of Adam Cole.
Best of 2013	December 28, 2013		Featured clips from 2013.
ROH Best in the World 2014 Preview	June 21, 2014		Rundown of ROH's 1st live PPV.
Best of Michael Elgin	June 28, 2014		Featured clips of Michael Elgin.
ROH Final Battle 2014 Preview	December 6, 2014		Rundown of ROH's 2nd live PPV.
Best of 2014	January 3, 2015		Featured clips from 2014.
ROH 13th Anniversary Show Preview	February 28, 2015		Rundown of ROH's 3rd live PPV.
ROH on Destination America	June 3, 2015	273,000	Premiere Episode of Ring of Honor Wrestling on Destination America.
Best of 2015	December 30, 2015		Featured clips from 2015.
ROH Global Wars 2016 Preview	April 30, 2016		Rundown of ROH Global Wars PPV.
Best of Jay Lethal	May 14, 2016		Featured clips of Jay Lethal.
Best of Bullet Club	May 21, 2016		Featured clips of Bullet Club.
Women of Honor Special	June 25, 2016		All matches featured Ring of Honor's women's division.
Best of ROH Wrestling TV	July 2, 2016		Celebrated Ring of Honor Wrestling's 250th episode as part of the Sinclair Broadcast Group and featured the best matches from the program's history.
Best of 2016	December 31, 2016		Featured clips from 2016.
Best of 2017	December 30, 2017		Featured clips from 2017.
Best of 2018	December 22, 2018 & December 29, 2018		Featured clips from 2018.
Best of 2019	December 21, 2019 & December 28, 2019		Featured clips from 2019.
Best of The Briscoe Bros.	March 28, 2020		Featured clips of Mark & Jay Briscoe.
Best of Jay Lethal	April 4, 2020		Featured clips of Jay Lethal.
Best of PCO	April 11, 2020		Featured clips of PCO.
Best of Matt Taven	April 18, 2020		Featured clips of Matt Taven.
Best of Flip Gordon	April 25, 2020		Featured clips of Flip Gordon.
Best of Mark Haskins	May 2, 2020		Featured clips of Mark Haskins.
Best of Marty Scurll	May 9, 2020		Featured clips of Marty Scurll.
Best of Dalton Castle	May 16, 2020		Featured clips of Dalton Castle.
Best of Dragon Lee	May 23, 2020		Featured clips of Dragon Lee.
Best of Rush	May 30, 2020		Featured clips of Rush.
Best of Brody King	June 6, 2020		Featured clips of Brody King.
Best of Silas Young	June 13, 2020		Featured clips of Silas Young.
Best of Bandido	June 20, 2020		Featured clips of Bandido.
Best of Kenny King	June 27, 2020		Featured clips of Kenny King.
Best of PJ Black	July 4, 2020		Featured clips of PJ Black.
Best of Vincent	July 11, 2020		Featured clips of Vincent.
Best of Hana Kimura	July 18, 2020		Featured clips of Hana Kimura.
Best of Jonathan Gresham	July 25, 2020		Featured clips of Jonathan Gresham.
Best of Joe Hendry	August 1, 2020		Featured clips of Joe Hendry.
Best of Shane Taylor	August 8, 2020		Featured clips of Shane Taylor.
Best of Rhett Titus	August 15, 2020		Featured clips of Rhett Titus.
Best of The Allüre	August 22, 2020		Featured clips of Mandy Leon & Angelina Love.
Best of Tracy Williams	August 29, 2020		Featured clips of Tracy Williams.
Best of The Bouncers	September 5, 2020		Featured clips of Brian Milonas & Beer City Bruiser.
The start of the Pure Championship Tournament	September 12, 2020		Featured the first two first-round matches: Dalton Castle vs. Jay Lethal & Jonathan Gresham vs. Wheeler Yuta.
Best of 2021	December 31, 2021		Featured clips from 2021.
Special Awards	January 7, 2022		Featured winners of the 2021 ROH awards as voted on by fans.
Women's World Championship Documentary	January 14, 2022		A behind the scenes look at the ROH Women's World Title tournament.
Final Battle: End of an Era highlights	January 21, 2022 & January 28, 2022		Featured matches from the 2021 Final Battle PPV.
Hall of Fame Special	March 4, 2022		Celebrated the inaugural class of the ROH Hall of Fame.

== Championships and accomplishments ==
As of September 25, 2026

=== Current champions ===
As of September 25, 2026.

=== Men's division ===
Singles

Championship	Current champion(s)	Reign	Date won	Days held	Location	Notes	Ref.
ROH World Championship	Bandido	2	April 6, 2025	537	Philadelphia, Pennsylvania	Defeated Chris Jericho in a Title vs. Mask match at AEW Dynasty.	
ROH World Television Championship	Action Andretti	1	August 21, 2026	35	Philadelphia, Pennsylvania	Defeated Lio Rush in a Fight Without Honor at Death Before Dishonor.	
ROH Pure Championship	Lee Moriarty	1	July 26, 2024	791	Arlington, Texas	Defeated Wheeler Yuta at Death Before Dishonor.	

Tag Team

Championship	Current champion(s)	Reign	Date won	Days held	Location	Notes	Ref.
ROH World Tag Team Championship	El Sky Team (Místico and Máscara Dorada)	1	June 26, 2026	91	Mexico City, Mexico	Defeated La Facción Ingobernable (Sammy Guevara and The Beast Mortos) at CMLL Super Viernes.	
ROH World Six-Man Tag Team Championship	The Lethal Twist (Jay Lethal, Blake Christian, and Lee Johnson)	1	August 21, 2026	35	Philadelphia, Pennsylvania	Defeated Dalton Castle and The Outrunners (Truth Magnum and Turbo Floyd) at Death Before Dishonor.	

=== Women's division ===
Championship	Current champion(s)	Reign	Date won	Days held	Location	Notes	Ref.
ROH Women's World Championship	Athena	1	December 10, 2022	1,385	Arlington, Texas	Defeated Mercedes Martinez at Final Battle.	
ROH Women's World Television Championship	Red Velvet	2	December 5, 2025	294	Columbus, Ohio	Defeated Mercedes Moné at Final Battle.	
ROH Women's Pure Championship	Deonna Purrazzo	1	December 5, 2025	294	Columbus, Ohio	Defeated Billie Starkz in a tournament final to become the inaugural champion at Final Battle.	

== Broadcast history ==
Channel (timeslot) ET	Years
2009 series
HDNet (Sat. 8pm)	2009
HDNet (Mon. 8pm)	2009
HDNet (Mon. 10pm)	2009–2011
2011 series
Sinclair stations (Weekends)	2011–2022
Destination America (Wed. 8pm)	2015
Destination America (Wed. 11pm)	2015
New England Sports Network (Thurs. 2am/2pm)	2015–2022
Comet (Wed. 12pm)	2015–2017
Charge (Sun. 10pm)	2017–2018
Cox Sports Television (Mon. 11pm and Fri. 11pm)	2018–2019
Charge (Sun. 10:30pm)	2018–2019
Fox Sports Networks (Fri. 12:00am)	2019–2021
Stadium (Wed., Sun. 8pm)	2020–2022
Charge (Sun. 10:00pm)	2020–2021
Bally Sports (Fri. 12:00am)	2021–2022
FITE TV (Weekends)	2022
2023 series
Honor Club (Thurs. 7:00pm)	2023–March 2026
Honor Club (Thurs. 8:00 pm)	April 2026–present

== See also ==
- List of professional wrestling television series
