= List of ROH World Television Champions =

Listing of professional wrestling champions for the ROH World Television Championship

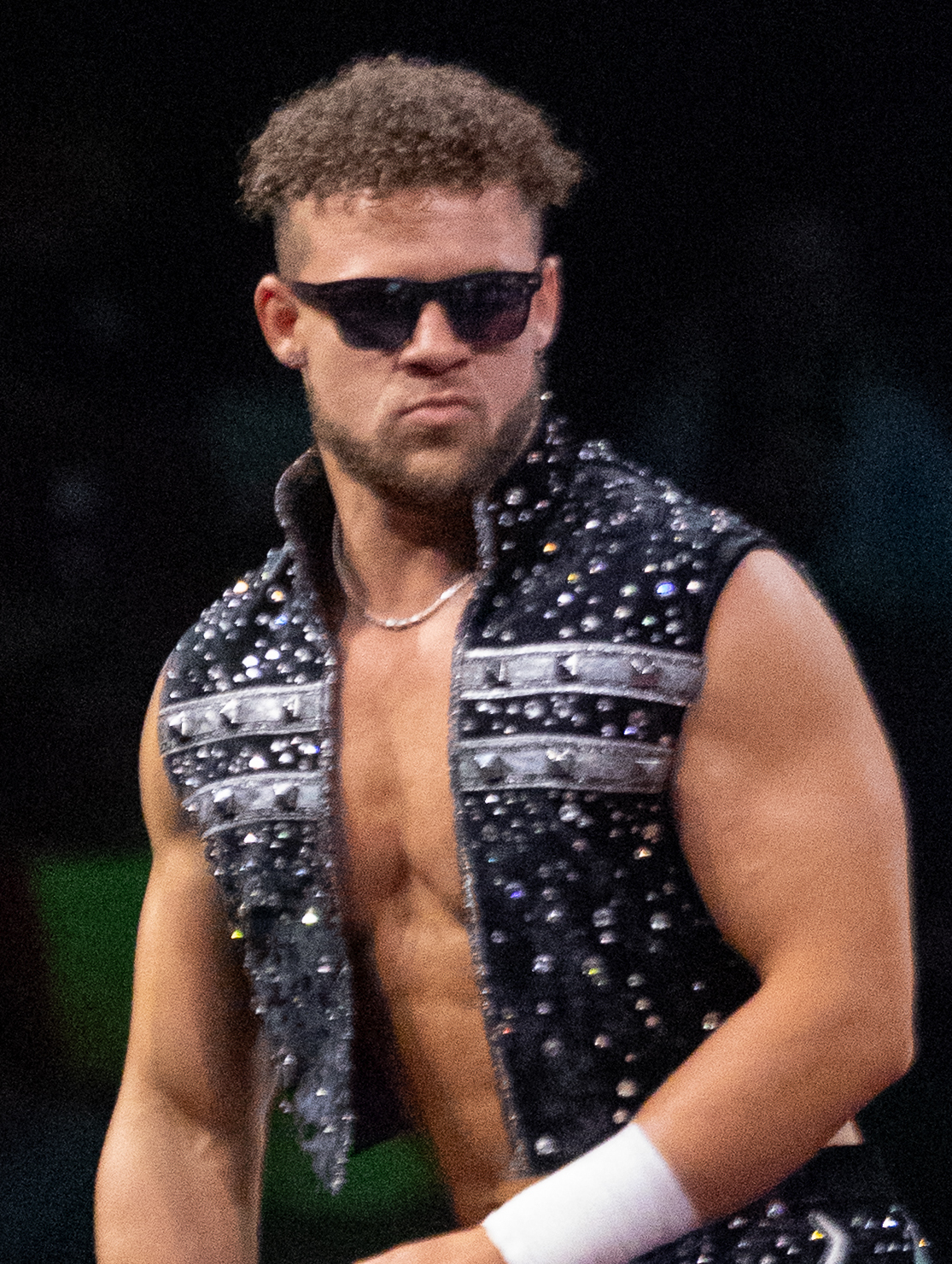
Current champion Action Andretti.

The ROH World Television Championship is a professional wrestling world television championship owned by the Ring of Honor (ROH) promotion. On January 20, 2010, the ROH World Television Championship was created by ROH and announced via ROH's official website.

ROH World Television Championships reigns are determined by professional wrestling matches, in which competitors are involved in scripted rivalries. These narratives create feuds between the various competitors, which cast them as villains and heroes. Some reigns were held by champions using a ring name, while others used their real name. Reigns that were won on pay-per-view events aired on tape delay up to weeks or months apart. Reigns that were won at live events were released on DVD as well as the ROH World Championships reigns. The inaugural champion was Eddie Edwards after defeating Davey Richards in the inaugural eight-man ROH World Television Championship Tournament finals.

As of November 11, 2026, there have been 38 reigns between 33 different champions. Samoa Joe's sole reign is the longest at 574 days, while Will Ospreay's reign is the shortest at 2 days. Jay Lethal has the longest combined reign at 798 days between 2 reigns. Minoru Suzuki is the oldest champion, winning the title at the age of 53. The current champion is Action Andretti, who is in his first reign. He won the title by defeating Lio Rush in a Fight Without Honor at Death Before Dishonor in Philadelphia, Pennsylvania, on August 21, 2026.

== Title history ==
Name	Years
ROH World Television Championship	2010 – present

Key
No.	Overall reign number
Reign	Reign number for the specific champion
Days	Number of days held
Days recog.	Number of days held recognized by the promotion
<1	Reign lasted less than a day
+	Current reign is changing daily

No.	Champion	Championship change			Reign statistics			Notes	Ref.
No.	Champion	Date	Event	Location	Reign	Days	Days recog.	Notes	Ref.
Ring of Honor (ROH)
1	Eddie Edwards	March 5, 2010	Ring of Honor Wrestling	Philadelphia, PA	1	280	280	Defeated Davey Richards in the final of an eight-man tournament to become the inaugural champion. The event aired on tape delay on April 26, 2010.	
2	Christopher Daniels	December 10, 2010	Ring of Honor Wrestling	Louisville, KY	1	198	198	Aired on tape delay January 31, 2011.	
3	El Generico	June 26, 2011	Best in the World	New York, NY	1	48	48		
4	Jay Lethal	August 13, 2011	Ring of Honor Wrestling	Chicago Ridge, IL	1	231	231	Aired on tape delay October 1, 2011.	
5	Roderick Strong	March 31, 2012	Showdown in the Sun: Day #2	Fort Lauderdale, FL	1	90	90		
6	Adam Cole	June 29, 2012	Ring of Honor Wrestling	Baltimore, MD	1	246	246	Aired on tape delay July 28, 2012.	
7	Matt Taven	March 2, 2013	11th Anniversary Show	Chicago Ridge, IL	1	287	287		
8	Tommaso Ciampa	December 14, 2013	Final Battle	New York, NY	1	111	111		
9	Jay Lethal	April 4, 2014	Supercard of Honor VIII	Westwego, LA	2	567	567	This was a Two Out of Three Falls Match.	
10	Roderick Strong	October 23, 2015	Glory By Honor XIV	Kalamazoo, MI	2	119	119		
11	Tomohiro Ishii	February 19, 2016	Honor Rising: Japan 2016	Tokyo, Japan	1	79	79		
12	Bobby Fish	May 8, 2016	Global Wars	Chicago Ridge, IL	1	194	194		
13	Will Ospreay	November 18, 2016	Reach for the Sky: Night 1	Liverpool, England	1	2	2		
14	Marty Scurll	November 20, 2016	Reach for the Sky: Night 3	London, England	1	175	175		
15	Kushida	May 14, 2017	War of the Worlds	Philadelphia, PA	1	131	131		
16	Kenny King	September 22, 2017	Death Before Dishonor XV	Sunrise Manor, NV	1	84	84		
17	Silas Young	December 15, 2017	Final Battle	New York, NY	1	57	57	This was a four-way elimination match, also including Punishment Martinez and Shane Taylor.	
18	Kenny King	February 10, 2018	Ring of Honor Wrestling	Atlanta, GA	2	56	41	Aired on tape delay February 25, 2018.	
19	Silas Young	April 7, 2018	Supercard of Honor XII	New Orleans, LA	2	70	70	This was a Last Man Standing match.	
20	Punishment Martinez	June 16, 2018	State of the Art Day 2	Dallas, TX	1	105	105	This was a Proving Ground Six-Man Mayhem Instant Reward match.	
21	Jeff Cobb	September 29, 2018	Ring of Honor Wrestling	Paradise, NV	1	222	202	Aired on tape delay October 19, 2018.	
22	Shane Taylor	May 9, 2019	War of The Worlds Day 2	Toronto, Ontario, Canada	1	218	218	This was a Four Corner Survival match, also involving Brody King and Hirooki Goto.	
23	Dragon Lee	December 13, 2019	Final Battle	Baltimore, MD	1	469	469		
24	Tracy Williams	N/A	ROH 19th Anniversary Show	Baltimore, MD	1	N/A	36	Defeated Kenny King, who was filling in for an injured Dragon Lee. Exact taping date is unknown. Aired on tape delay on March 26, 2021.	
25	Tony Deppen	April 30, 2021	Ring of Honor Wrestling	Baltimore, MD	1	72	72		
26	Dragon Lee	July 11, 2021	Best in the World	Baltimore, MD	2	133	133		
27	Dalton Castle	November 21, 2021	Ring of Honor Wrestling	Baltimore, MD	1	20	20		
28	Rhett Titus	December 11, 2021	Final Battle	Baltimore, MD	1	111	111	This was a Four Corner Survival match, also involving Joe Hendry and Silas Young. During this reign, Tony Khan purchased Ring of Honor.	
29	Minoru Suzuki	April 1, 2022	Supercard of Honor XV	Garland, TX	1	12	12		
30	Samoa Joe	April 13, 2022	Dynamite	New Orleans, LA	1	574	574	This was an All Elite Wrestling event.	
—	Vacated	November 8, 2023	Dynamite	Portland, OR	—	—	—	This was an All Elite Wrestling event. Joe relinquished the title to focus on pursuing the AEW World Championship.	
31	Kyle Fletcher	December 15, 2023	Final Battle	Garland, TX	1	196	196	Fletcher defeated Komander, Lee Moriarty, Dalton Castle, Lee Johnson, and Bryan Keith in a Survival of the Fittest to win the vacant title.	
32	Atlantis Jr.	June 28, 2024	Super Viernes	Mexico City, Mexico	1	106	106	This was a Consejo Mundial de Lucha Libre event.	
33	Brian Cage	October 12, 2024	WrestleDream; Zero Hour	Tacoma, WA	1	69	69	This was an All Elite Wrestling event.	
34	Komander	December 20, 2024	Final Battle	New York, NY	1	118	118	This was a Survival of the Fittest, also involving Willie Mack, Mark Davis, AR Fox and Blake Christian.	
35	Nick Wayne	April 17, 2025	Collision: Spring BreakThru	Boston, MA	1	387	387	This was an All Elite Wrestling event.	
36	AR Fox	May 9, 2026	Supercard Showdown	Palm Beach Gardens, FL	1	33	35	Aired on tape delay on May 14, 2026 as a special episode of Ring of Honor Wrestling.	
37	Lio Rush	June 11, 2026	Global Wars Cincinnati	Cincinnati, OH	1	153	146	This was a three-way match also involving Action Andretti. Also this match aired on tape delay on June 18, 2026 as a special episode of Ring of Honor Wrestling.	
38	Action Andretti	August 21, 2026	Death Before Dishonor	Philadelphia, PA	1	82+	82+	This was a Fight Without Honor match.	

== Combined reigns ==
As of November 11, 2026.

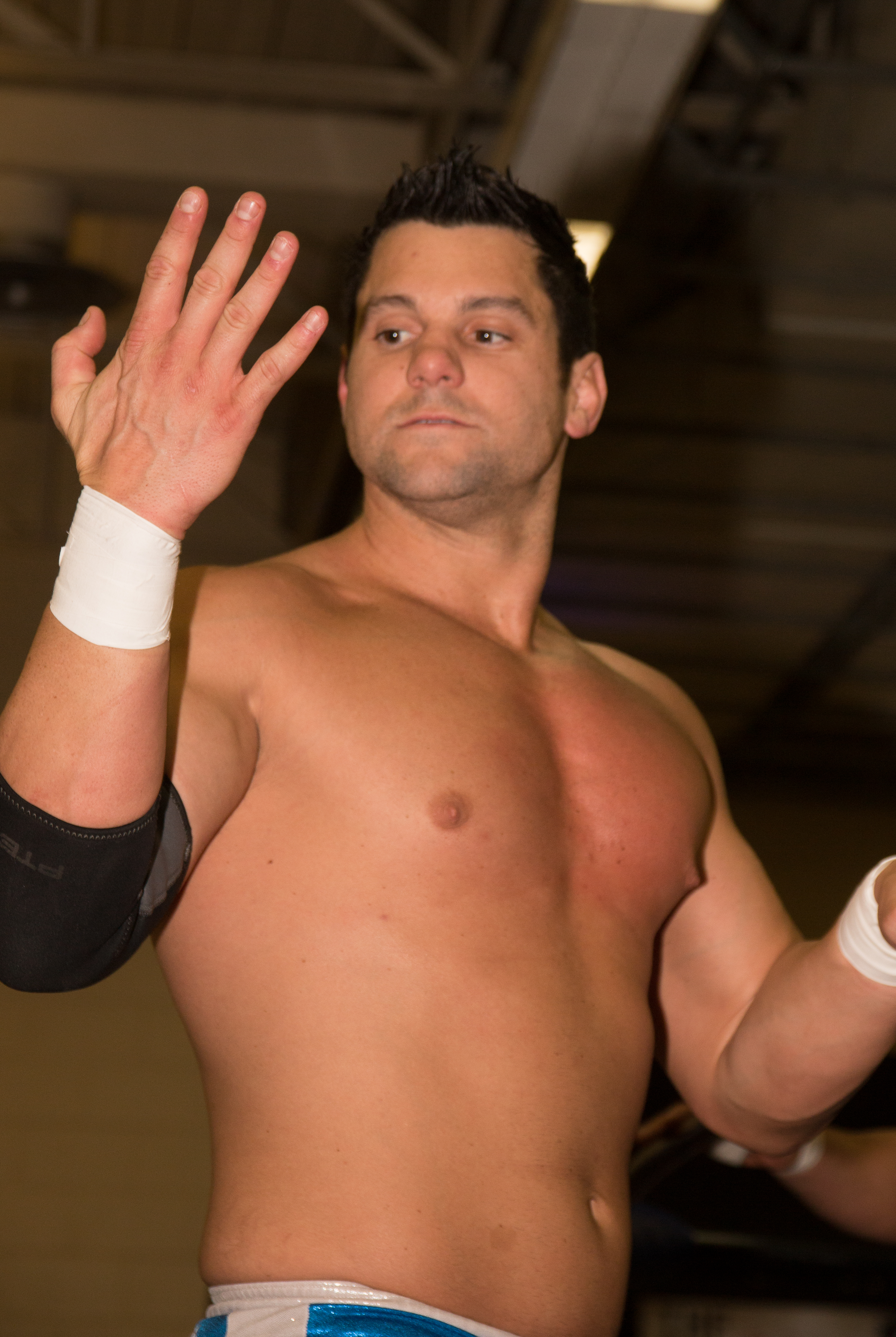
Inaugural champion Eddie Edwards.

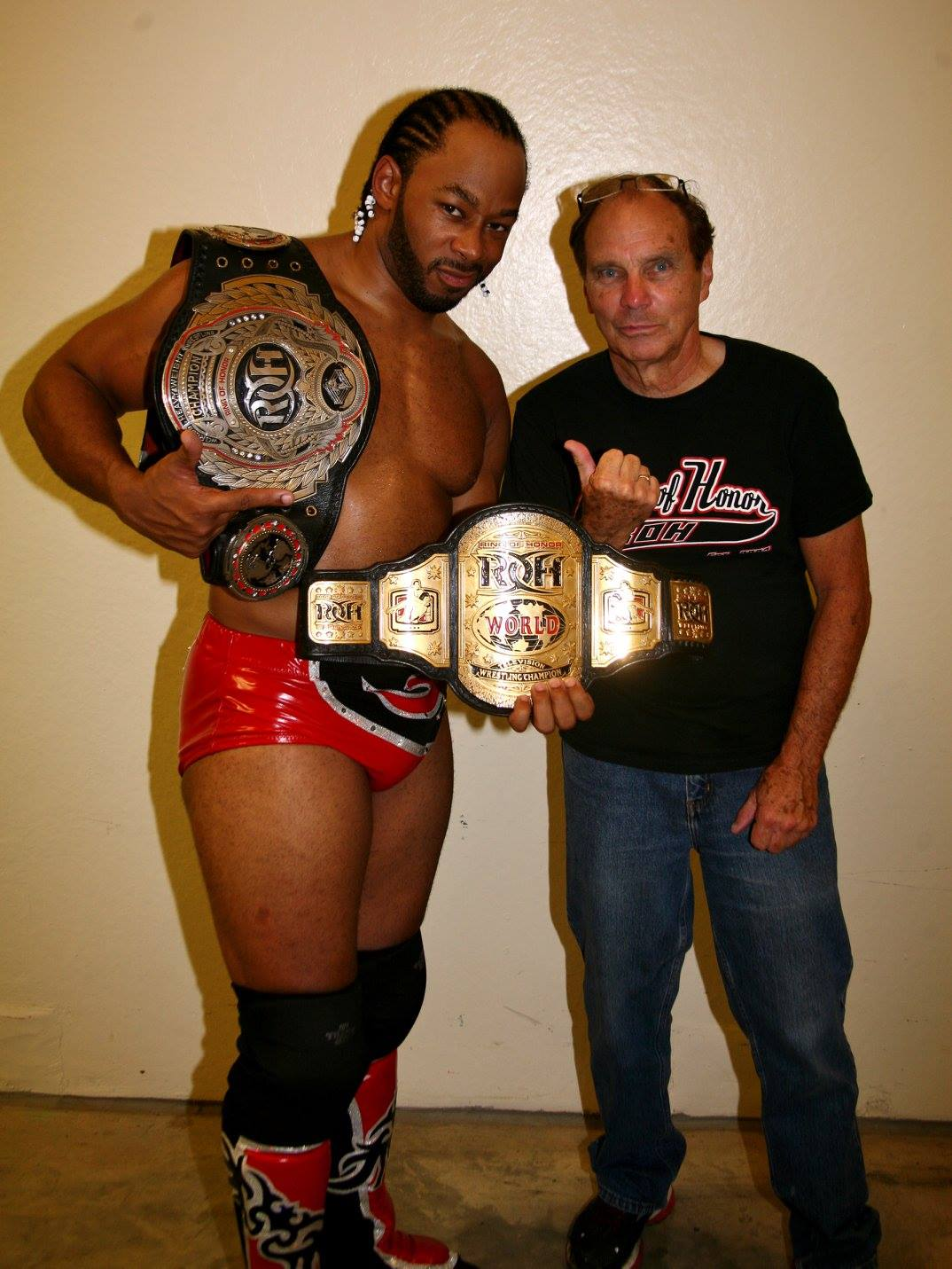
Record-tying two-time champion Jay Lethal (left) has the longest combined reign at 798 days.

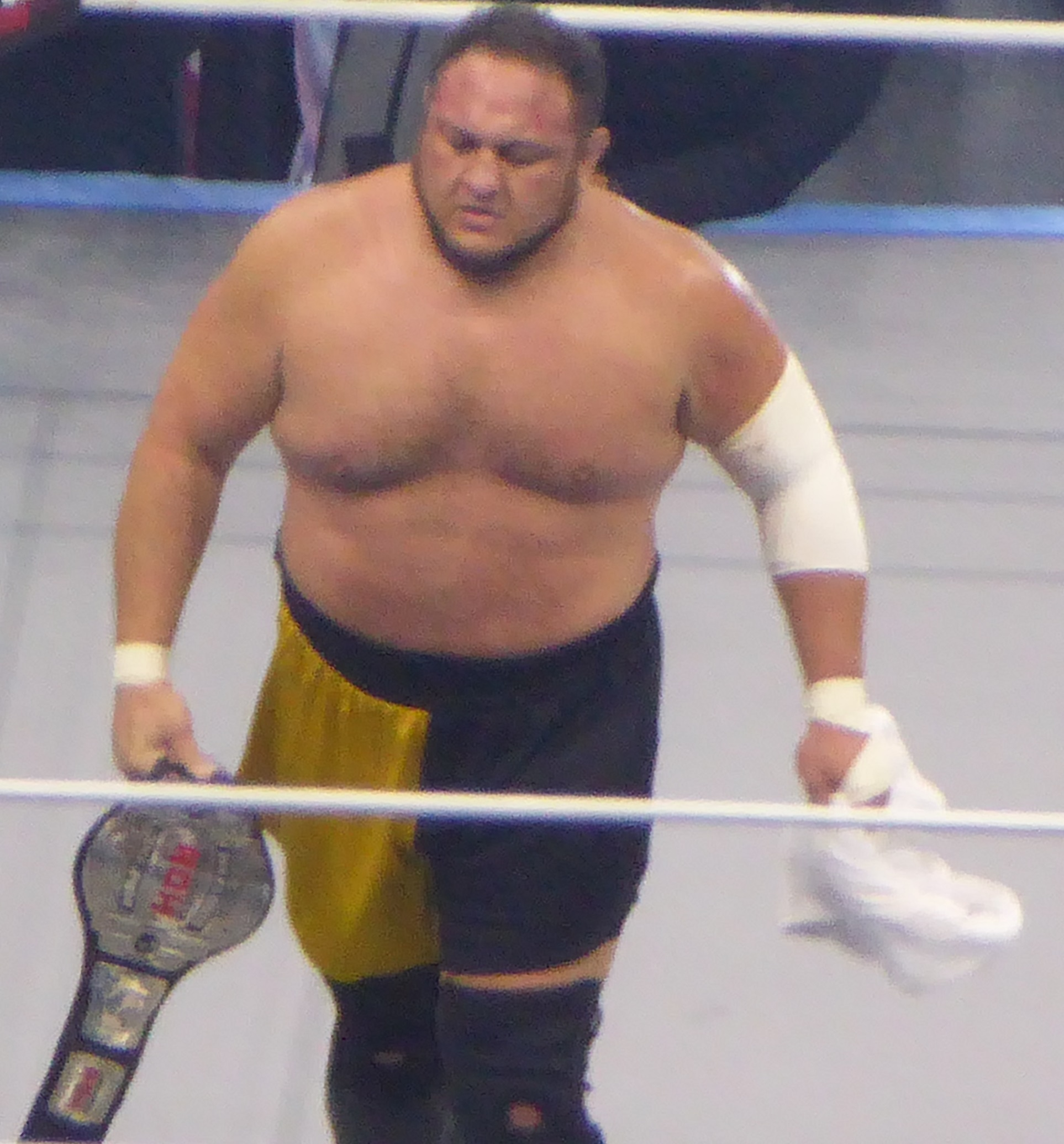
With 574 days as champion, Samoa Joe has the longest reign.

†	Indicates the current champion

Rank	Wrestler	No. of reigns	Combined days	Combined days rec. by ROH
1	Jay Lethal	2	798	
2	Dragon Lee	2	602	
3	Samoa Joe	1	574	
4	Nick Wayne	1	387	
5	Matt Taven	1	287	
6	Eddie Edwards	1	280	
7	Adam Cole	1	246	
8	Jeff Cobb	1	222	202
9	Shane Taylor	1	218	
10	Roderick Strong	2	209	
11	Christopher Daniels	1	198	
12	Kyle Fletcher	1	196	
13	Bobby Fish	1	194	
14	Marty Scurll	1	175	
15	Kenny King	2	140	
16	Kushida	1	131	
17	Silas Young	2	127	
18	Komander	1	118	
19	Tommaso Ciampa	1	111	
19	Rhett Titus	1	111	
21	Atlantis Jr.	1	106	
22	Punishment Martinez	1	105	
23	Lio Rush	1	109	102
24	Action Andretti †	1	82+	
25	Tomohiro Ishii	1	79	
26	Tony Deppen	1	72	
27	Brian Cage	1	69	
28	El Generico	1	48	
29	AR Fox	1	33	35
30	Tracy Williams	1	N/A	36
31	Dalton Castle	1	20	
32	Minoru Suzuki	1	12	
33	Will Ospreay	1	2	
