= Damian Priest =

American professional wrestler (born 1982)

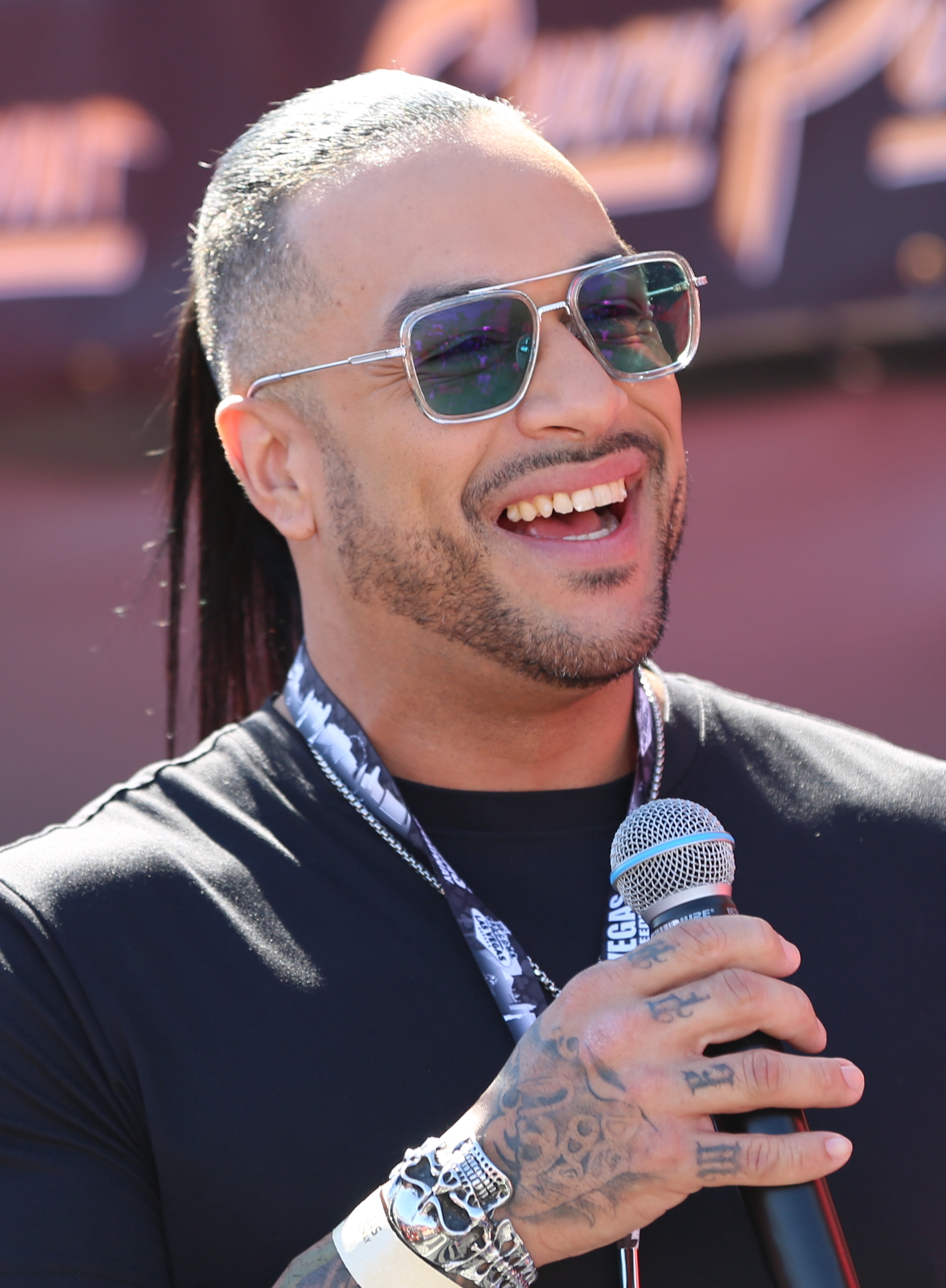
- Priest in 2025

Personal information
- Born: Luis Martinez; September 26, 1982 (age 44) Bronx, New York City, U.S.

Professional wrestling career
- Ring name(s): Damian Martinez; Damian Priest; Luis Martinez; Punisher Martinez; Punishment Martinez
- Billed height: 6 ft 5 in (196 cm)
- Billed weight: 249 lb (113 kg)
- Billed from: New York City
- Trained by: Monster Factory; WWE Performance Center
- Debut: March 25, 2005

Luis Martínez (born September 26, 1982) is an American professional wrestler. As of October 2018, he is signed to WWE, where he performs on the SmackDown brand under the ring name Damian Priest. He also performs in WWE's sister promotion, Lucha Libre AAA Worldwide (AAA). He is also known for his tenures in Ring of Honor (ROH), where he performed under the ring name Punishment Martinez, and New Japan Pro-Wrestling (NJPW) through a working relation between the two companies, performing as Punisher Martinez.

After performing in independent promotions throughout the East Coast, Martínez joined Ring of Honor in 2015, where he won the ROH World Television Championship. He joined WWE in 2018 and began on its developmental brand, NXT, under the Damian Priest ring name, winning the NXT North American Championship. In 2021, he moved to WWE's main roster and won the WWE United States Championship. He rose to popularity during his time as a co-founding member of The Judgment Day from 2022 to 2024, where he won the 2023 Men's Money in the Bank contract, became a four-time tag team champion, holding the Raw and SmackDown Tag Team Championships twice each under the Undisputed WWE Tag Team Championship banner with former Judgment Day stablemate Finn Bálor (being the only tag team to achieve such an accolade), and won the World Heavyweight Championship at WrestleMania XL after becoming the second man in history to cash in successfully at the event. He also held the SmackDown Tag Team Championship once more (with R-Truth) after it had since been renamed as WWE Tag Team Championship.

== Early life ==
Luis Martínez was born in New York City to a Nuyorican family, but raised in Vega Baja, Puerto Rico, where he first saw the World Wrestling Council (WWC) on television and developed an interest in becoming a professional wrestler. He learned Gōjū-ryū karate from his martial artist father. After winning two national championships in full-contact martial arts, Martínez decided to embark on a career in professional wrestling. When he returned to New York, Spanish was still his first language and he underwent a period of cultural adaptation. He was ten years old when he returned and lived primarily in The Bronx. At one point, Martínez was homeless, and worked as a bouncer to make ends meet.

== Professional wrestling career ==
=== Early career (2005–2015) ===
Martinez made his wrestling debut in 2005 performing in independent promotions in the East Coast for the next decade, mainly in New Jersey and New York before making his debut for then-Philadelphia, Pennsylvania-based promotion Ring of Honor (ROH).

=== Ring of Honor (2015–2018) ===
Martinez's first appearance at an ROH show was in 2015, where he competed in two dark matches under his real name, losing the first to The Romantic Touch and winning the second alongside Shaheem Ali against Hellcat and Mattick.

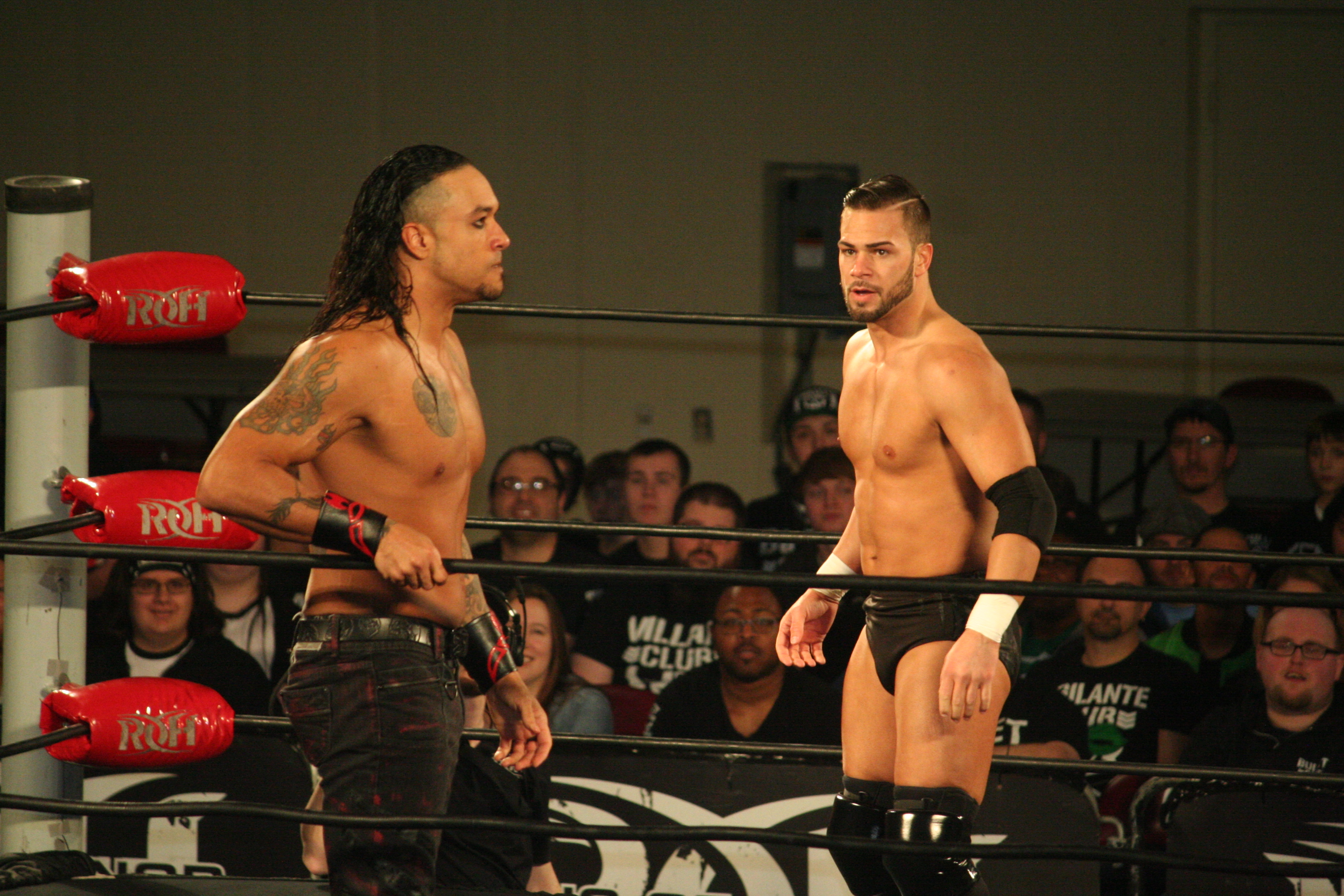
Martinez (left) during a match against Flip Gordon in February 2018

Martinez returned to Ring of Honor in early 2016 to compete in the ROH Top Prospect Tournament, under the new ring name Punishment Martinez, defeating Colby Corino in the first round. Martinez lost to Lio Rush in the semifinals; however, despite the loss, Martinez was signed to a contract by Ring of Honor. He became a villain when he aligned himself with B. J. Whitmer and Kevin Sullivan, entering a rivalry with their adversary Steve Corino. On September 16, Martinez took part in the Honor Rumble, but was eliminated. In early November, he participated in the Survival of the Fittest, where he was eliminated in the final Six Man Mayhem match. Martinez and Whitmer went on to briefly feud with the former ROH World Tag Team Champions War Machine (Hanson and Raymond Rowe), first wrestling them to a no contest and then defeating them in an anything-goes match.

Through ROH's working relationship with New Japan Pro-Wrestling (NJPW), Martinez appeared at the two-day event Honor Rising: Japan. On the first night on February 26, Martinez teamed up with Los Ingobernables de Japón members Hiromu Takahashi and Tetsuya Naito, defeating Dalton Castle, Hiroshi Tanahashi and Ryusuke Taguchi. The next night, Martinez unsuccessfully challenged Hirooki Goto for the NEVER Openweight Championship. He returned to ROH on March 14 now under the ring name Damian Martinez, unsuccessfully competing in a Manhattan Mayhem Battle Royal for #1 contendership to the ROH World Championship.

At the promotion's State of the Art event on June 16, 2018, Martinez pinned Cheeseburger in a six-way Proving Ground match to earn a shot at the ROH World Television Championship immediately following the match, defeating Silas Young to win the title. On June 29 at Best in the World, he defeated "Hangman" Adam Page in a Baltimore Street Fight to retain the title. At Death Before Dishonor XVI on September 28, Martinez successfully defended the title against Chris Sabin. After the match, he attacked Sabin before Jeff Cobb made the save. In his final appearance for the promotion, he dropped the Television Championship to Cobb. On September 29, Martinez's contract with Ring of Honor expired and he opted out of a contract offer.

=== WWE ===
==== Beginnings in NXT (2018–2020) ====
Before signing with WWE, Martinez made an appearance at the Money in the Bank pay-per-view on June 29, 2014, playing the role of a security guard standing behind Stephanie McMahon, who confronted The Bella Twins.

On October 12, 2018, Martinez signed a contract with WWE; six days later, he was formally introduced among other new members to the NXT brand. At an NXT taping on December 5, he made his debut as a heel under the Punishment Martinez ring name, losing to Matt Riddle. On the June 5, 2019 episode of NXT, a vignette aired, reintroducing Martinez as Damian Priest. He made his debut under the character on the June 19 episode of NXT, defeating Raul Mendoza. On the July 24 episode of NXT, he defeated Keith Lee in his second appearance.

On the October 2 episode of NXT, Priest started a feud with Pete Dunne and Killian Dain, culminating in a triple threat match at NXT TakeOver: WarGames on November 23 for #1 contendership to the NXT Championship, which Dunne won. The next night, at Survivor Series, Priest was a part of the 5-on-5-on-5 Survivor Series match, representing Team NXT in a losing effort to Team SmackDown and Team Raw; he was eliminated by Randy Orton. In January 2020, Priest was involved in a storyline around the NXT North American Championship with Keith Lee and Dominik Dijakovic, fighting for the title against Lee and Dijakovic and in a singles match against Lee on the April 1 and 29 episodes of NXT, respectively, but lost both times.

==== NXT North American Champion (2020–2021) ====
On the April 22 episode of NXT, Finn Bálor was attacked backstage by an unknown attacker. It was revealed on the May 13 episode of NXT as being Priest, leading to a match between the two at TakeOver: In Your House on June 7, where Priest lost to Bálor. Despite losing the match, his performance was highly praised by Triple H, and on the June 10 episode of NXT, he praised Bálor during a backstage segment, turning face in the process.

Priest defeated Oney Lorcan and Ridge Holland on the August 5 episode of NXT to qualify for the NXT North American Championship ladder match at NXT TakeOver: XXX. At the event on August 22, Priest won the NXT North American Championship, his first championship in WWE. He made his first title defense on the September 16 episode of NXT, defeating Timothy Thatcher. The following week, NXT General Manager William Regal announced that Priest would defend the title against Johnny Gargano at NXT TakeOver 31 on October 4, in which he successfully retained the title. Priest lost the championship to Gargano at Halloween Havoc on October 28 in a Devil's Playground match, ending his reign at 65 days.

On the November 11 episode of NXT, Priest distracted Gargano during his title defense against Leon Ruff, causing Gargano to lose the title to Ruff. The following week, Ruff retained the title against Gargano by disqualification after Priest punched Ruff during the match, disabling Gargano to win the title. At NXT TakeOver: WarGames on December 6, Priest failed to win the title from Ruff in a triple threat match involving Gargano after he was attacked by a masked character and its gang that had previously attacked him at Halloween Havoc, who was soon revealed to be Austin Theory. On the following episode of NXT, Priest looked forward to revenge against Theory, but was viciously attacked from behind by the returning Karrion Kross. At New Year's Evil on January 6, Priest lost to Kross, marking his final match in NXT.

==== United States Champion (2021–2022) ====
On January 31, 2021, at the Royal Rumble pay-per-view, Priest entered the Royal Rumble match at #14, eliminating John Morrison, The Miz, Elias and Kane before being eliminated by Bobby Lashley. The next night on Raw, Priest made his debut for the brand after being introduced by Bad Bunny during a Miz TV segment, defeating Miz later that night. On the April 5 episode of Raw, Priest and Bad Bunny challenged John Morrison and the Miz to a tag team match at WrestleMania 37, which they accepted. At Night 1 of WrestleMania on April 10, Priest and Bad Bunny defeated The Miz and Morrison. On the following episode of Raw, Priest lost to The Miz and Morrison in a 2-on-1 handicap match after outside interference by Maryse, marking his first loss on the main roster. At WrestleMania Backlash on May 16, Priest defeated Miz in a Zombie Lumberjack match (as part of a promotional tie-in for the 2021 zombie film Army of the Dead), ending their feud. Following the event, he went on a brief hiatus due to a back injury.

Priest returned on the July 12 episode of Raw, saving Humberto Carrillo from an attack by United States Champion Sheamus after their title match and starting a feud between the two. He challenged Sheamus to a title match at SummerSlam on the August 9 episode of Raw, which Sheamus accepted. At SummerSlam on August 21, Priest defeated Sheamus to win the United States Championship for the first time in his career. He made his first successful title defense against Sheamus and Drew McIntyre in a triple threat match on the August 30 episode of Raw. Priest retained the title against Jeff Hardy on the September 13 episode of Raw, and in a triple threat match also involving Sheamus at Extreme Rules on September 26. On the following episode of Raw, Priest defeated Sheamus in a no-disqualification, no count-out match to retain the title, ending their feud. He then successfully defended the title against Hardy in a rematch on the October 4 episode of Raw.

On the October 25 episode of Raw, with a new, revamped character, he defeated T-Bar; after the latter threw a chair at the former outside the ring, Priest viciously attacked T-Bar, turning himself into a tweener. At Survivor Series on November 21, Priest lost to Intercontinental Champion Shinsuke Nakamura in a champion vs. champion match by disqualification after repeated distractions from Nakamura's ally Rick Boogs, causing Priest to attack both of them, marking his second loss on the main roster. Over the following months, Priest successfully defended the title on Raw against the likes of Sami Zayn, Apollo Crews, Robert Roode, Dolph Ziggler, Kevin Owens and AJ Styles. On the February 21, 2022 episode of Raw, Finn Bálor challenged Priest to a title match on the following episode of Raw, where Priest lost the United States Championship to Balor, ending his reign at 191 days. After the match, Priest attacked Bálor, turning heel.

==== The Judgment Day and World Heavyweight Champion (2022–2024) ====
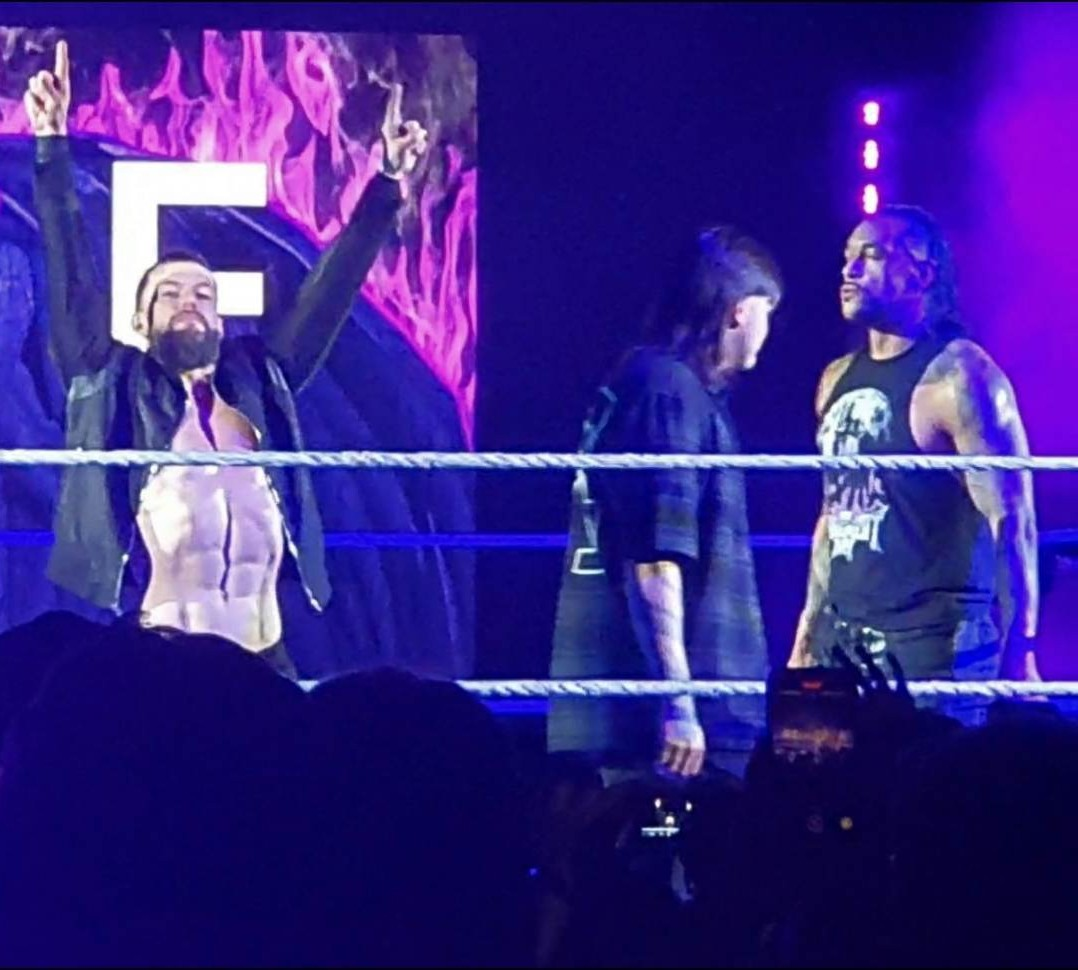
Priest (right) joined The Judgment Day in April 2022.

At Night 2 of WrestleMania 38 on April 3, Priest distracted AJ Styles during his match against Edge, causing Styles to lose the match. After the match, Edge celebrated his victory with Priest, starting an alliance between the two. Following WrestleMania, Edge and Priest were dubbed The Judgment Day. At Hell in a Cell on June 5, The Judgment Day (Edge, Priest and Rhea Ripley) defeated Styles, Finn Bálor, and Liv Morgan in a six-person mixed tag team match. The next night on Raw, Edge introduced Bálor as the newest member of The Judgment Day. However, Bálor, Priest and Ripley suddenly attacked Edge, kicking him out of the stable. The Judgment Day then began a feud with the Mysterios (composed of Rey and Dominik Mysterio) in an attempt to recruit Dominik into their ranks. At SummerSlam on July 30, Priest and Bálor were defeated by the Mysterios following interference from a returning Edge. On September 3, at Clash at the Castle, Priest and Bálor lost to Edge and Rey Mysterio, after which Dominik turned heel on both of them to join The Judgment Day. At Crown Jewel on November 5, Priest, Bálor, and Dominik defeated The O.C. (Styles, Luke Gallows, and Karl Anderson) in a six-man tag team match after interference from Ripley. On the November 28 episode of Raw, The Judgment Day defeated The O.C. in an eight-person mixed tag team match to end their feud.

On the January 9, 2023 episode of Raw, Priest, Bálor and Dominik won a tag team turmoil match for a Raw Tag Team Championship opportunity against The Usos. At Raw is XXX on January 23, The Usos successfully defended the championship against Priest and Dominik despite Jimmy Uso's injury, with Sami Zayn taking Jimmy's place. At the Royal Rumble on January 28, Priest entered the Royal Rumble match at #22; although he and Balor were eliminated by the returning Edge, they eliminated him as a result with help from Dominik afterwards. On the February 6 episode of Raw, Priest defeated Angelo Dawkins to qualify for the Elimination Chamber match for the United States Championship. At Elimination Chamber on February 18, Priest failed to win the title inside the namesake structure.

On the Raw after WrestleMania 39, Priest got involved in Dominik's confrontation with his former tag team partner Bad Bunny, chokeslamming him through the announcer's table. Bad Bunny returned on the April 24 episode of Raw and challenged Priest to a San Juan Street Fight at Backlash on May 6, which Priest lost after Savio Vega and Carlito equalized in fending off his fellow Judgment Day stablemates. The match was met with critical acclaim, with many deeming it the best match of the event. Priest, alongside Bálor, were then selected as the Raw participants for the new World Heavyweight Championship tournament, but Priest lost his qualifying match to Seth "Freakin" Rollins at the quarterfinals round on the May 8 episode of Raw. On the June 5 episode of Raw, Priest unsuccessfully challenged Rollins for the World Heavyweight Championship. Bálor interfered during the match to Priest's chagrin as Priest claimed he did not need The Judgment Day to beat Rollins.

On the June 12 episode of Raw, Priest defeated Matt Riddle to qualify for the men's Money in the Bank ladder match on July 1, where Priest successfully retrieved the briefcase. Later that night, Priest appeared halfway through the World Heavyweight Championship match between Bálor and Seth Rollins. Priest's presence distracted Bálor, allowing Rollins to take advantage and win the match, much to Bálor's irritation. At Payback on September 2, Priest and Bálor defeated Kevin Owens and Sami Zayn to win the Undisputed WWE Tag Team Championship after interference from Dominik, Ripley and JD McDonagh. Priest became the third wrestler to win a title and hold the Money in the Bank briefcase simultaneously, the first being Rob Van Dam with the Intercontinental Championship in 2006 and The Miz in 2010 with the United States Championship. On the September 25 episode of Raw, Priest and Bálor defeated Owens and Zayn in a rematch to retain their titles. At Fastlane on October 7, Priest and Bálor lost the titles to Cody Rhodes and Jey Uso after McDonagh accidentally hit Priest with the briefcase, ending their first reign at 35 days. Priest and Bálor, however, regained the titles in a rematch on the October 16 episode of Raw after interference from Jimmy Uso.

At Crown Jewel on November 4, Priest attempted to cash in on Rollins after his successful title defense against Drew McIntyre, but Zayn stopped him and ran off with the briefcase before he could officially do so. Later that night, Priest lost to Rhodes. On the November 13 episode of Raw, Priest and Bálor defeated Rhodes and Uso in a rematch to retain their titles after interference from McIntyre. On the November 24 episode of SmackDown, Priest and Bálor retained their titles against the Street Profits (Angelo Dawkins and Montez Ford). The next night at Survivor Series: WarGames, Priest participated in his first WarGames match alongside The Judgment Day and McIntyre, losing to Rhodes, Rollins, Uso, Zayn, and the returning Randy Orton. On the December 18 episode of Raw, Priest and Bálor successfully defended their titles against The Creed Brothers (Brutus Creed and Julius Creed). At Royal Rumble on January 27, 2024, Priest entered the namesake match at #26, eliminating R-Truth before being eliminated by Sami Zayn. On the following episode of Raw, Priest and Bálor defeated #DIY (Johnny Gargano and Tommaso Ciampa) to retain their titles. At Elimination Chamber: Perth on February 24, Priest and Bálor successfully defended the titles against New Catch Republic (Pete Dunne and Tyler Bate). On Night 1 of WrestleMania XL on April 6, Priest and Bálor lost the SmackDown Tag Team Championship to A-Town Down Under (Austin Theory and Grayson Waller) and the Raw Tag Team Championship to the Awesome Truth (The Miz and R-Truth) respectively in a six-pack tag team ladder match, ending their second reign with the undisputed titles at 173 days.

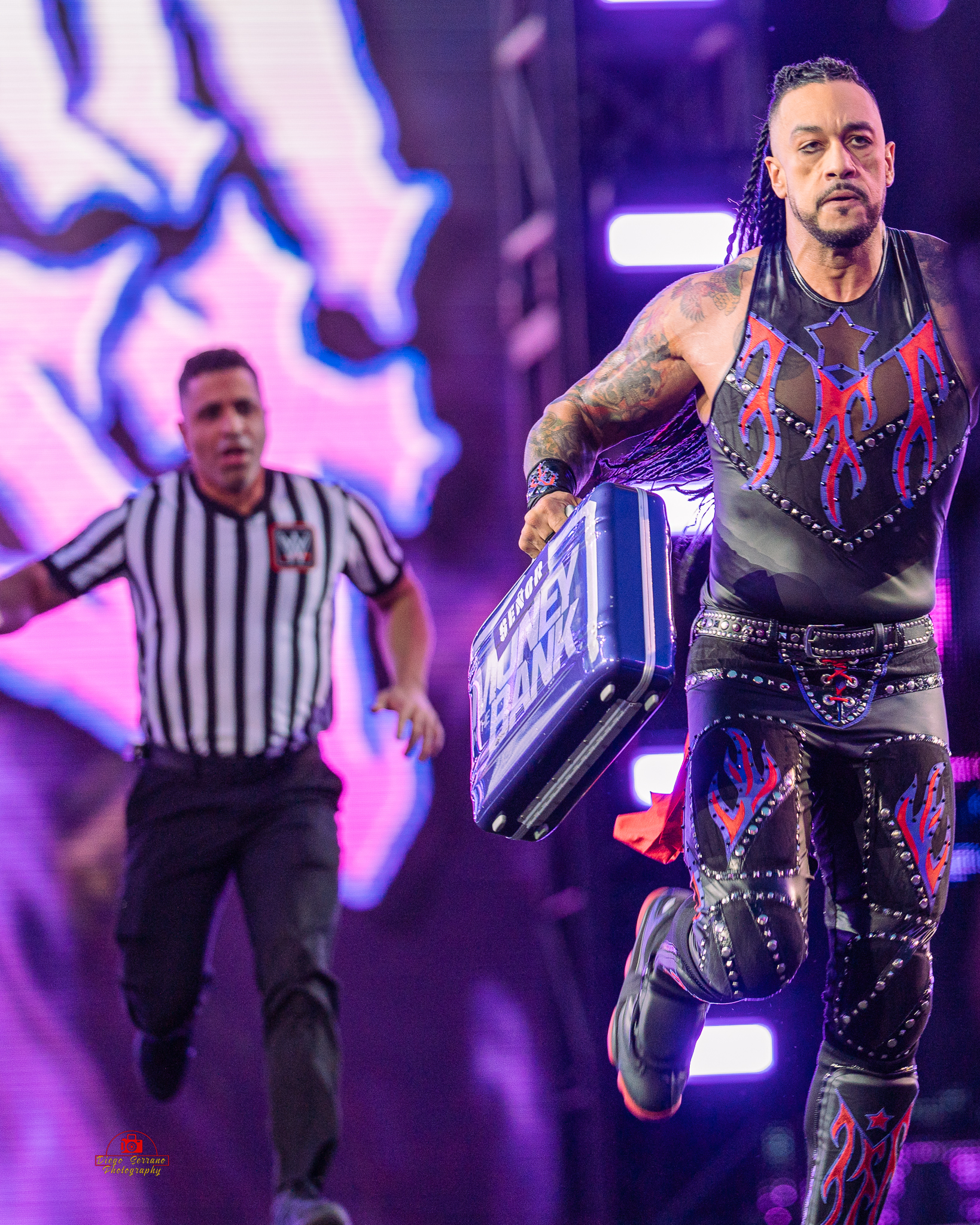
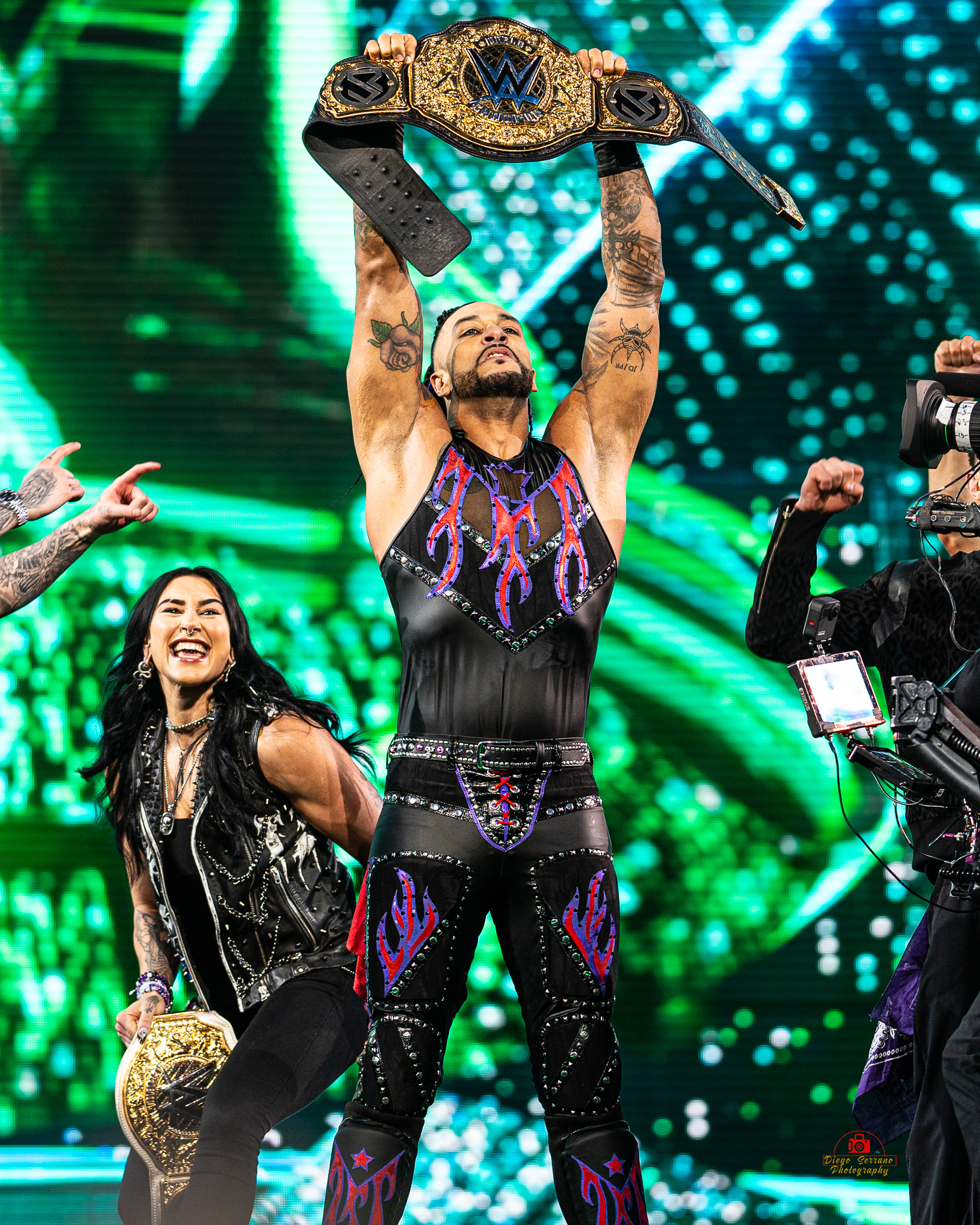
At WrestleMania XL, Damian Priest cashed in his Money in the Bank contract on Drew McIntyre, successfully winning the World Heavyweight Championship.

The following day, at Night 2 of WrestleMania XL, Priest successfully cashed in his Money in the Bank contract on Drew McIntyre to win the World Heavyweight Championship following an attack by CM Punk, becoming the second person, after Rollins, to cash in at WrestleMania, as well as the first world champion of Puerto Rican descent, and second overall, since Pedro Morales in 1971. At Backlash France on May 4, Priest defeated Jey Uso in his first defense after interference from Bálor and McDonagh, despite asking them not to interfere. On June 15, at Clash at the Castle: Scotland, Priest successfully defended the title against McIntyre in the latter's home country after interference from Punk. On the June 17 episode of Raw, Priest challenged the returning Seth Rollins to a title match at Money in the Bank, which received a stipulation the next week; if Rollins lost, he would be unable to challenge Priest for the title as long as he held it. but if Priest lost, he would be forced to leave The Judgment Day. At the event on July 6, Priest successfully defended his title against Rollins and McIntyre, the latter of whom cashed in his newly won Money in the Bank briefcase during the match, but was attacked by Punk. Priest subsequently pinned McIntyre to retain his title. After the event, Priest began showing more respect to his opponents as his crowd support gradually increased, teasing a face turn in the process. At SummerSlam on August 3, Priest lost the title to King of the Ring winner Gunther via technical submission, ending his reign at 118 days. In the closing moments, Priest hit Gunther with a South of Heaven chokeslam, only for Bálor to betray Priest by placing Gunther's foot on the bottom rope to void the pin turning Priest face.

==== Singles competition (2024–present) ====
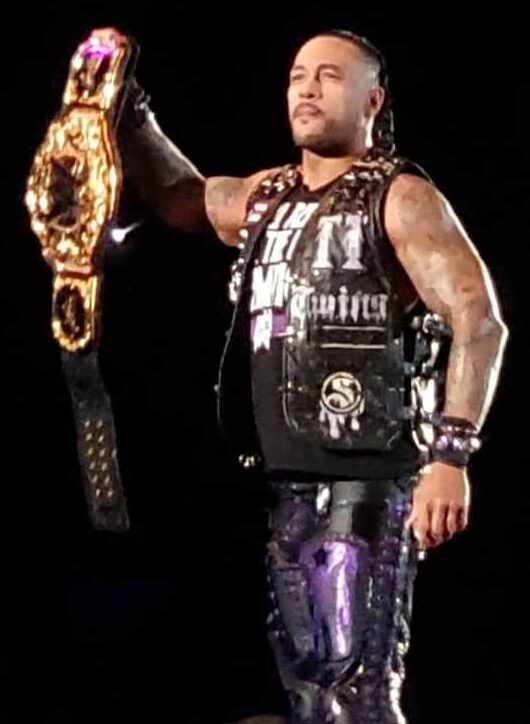
Priest in 2024

On the following episode of Raw, Bálor officially kicked Priest and Ripley out of the group (the latter having been betrayed by "Dirty" Dominik Mysterio at SummerSlam) and introduced the "new" Judgment Day, consisting of himself, Mysterio, JD McDonagh, and the new additions of Carlito (once an associate member of the group now an official member) and Liv Morgan. Later that night, during Priest's match against McDonagh, he was ambushed by Bálor and the rest of The Judgment Day, until Ripley came out to save him. Priest and Ripley would afterwards embrace each other, staying together as a team and going by their unofficial tag team name, the Terror Twins. At Bash in Berlin on August 31, Priest and Ripley defeated Mysterio and Morgan, with Ripley pinning Morgan despite interference from The Judgment Day. At Bad Blood on October 5, Priest defeated Bálor despite interference from Carlito and McDonagh. On the November 4 episode of Raw, Priest defeated "Dirty" Dominik Mysterio, Seth "Freakin" Rollins and Sheamus in a fatal four-way match to become the #1 contender for the World Heavyweight Championship. At Survivor Series WarGames on November 30, Priest failed to regain the title from Gunther after interference from Bálor. At Saturday Night's Main Event on December 14, Priest once again challenged Gunther for the title in a triple threat match also involving Bálor in a losing effort. On the January 13, 2025 episode of Raw, Priest defeated Bálor in a street fight despite interference from Carlito and McDonagh, ending their feud.

On January 24, Priest was transferred to the SmackDown brand, and defeated Carmelo Hayes that same night in his first match as part of the brand. At Royal Rumble on February 1, Priest entered the men's Royal Rumble match as entrant #28, eliminating "Dirty" Dominik Mysterio and Drew McIntyre before being eliminated by LA Knight. On the February 14 episode of SmackDown, Priest qualified for the Elimination Chamber match at Elimination Chamber: Toronto by defeating Braun Strowman and Jacob Fatu in a triple threat match. At the namesake event, he eliminated McIntyre but was eliminated soon after by Logan Paul after McIntyre attacked him in retaliation. This led to a match on Night 2 of WrestleMania 41, where Priest lost to McIntyre in a Sin City Street Fight. At Backlash on May 10, Priest unsuccessfully challenged Jacob Fatu for the United States Championship in a fatal four-way match, also involving LA Knight and McIntyre. At Saturday Night's Main Event on May 24, Priest and McIntyre faced off in a WrestleMania rematch contested in a Steel Cage match, which Priest won by walking out of the cage, ending their feud.

Following his feud with McIntyre, Priest began feuding with Aleister Black, culminating in a Last Man Standing match on the October 10 episode of SmackDown which Priest lost due to interference from Black's real-life wife Zelina. On the October 24 episode of Smackdown, he prevented Black from winning the United States Championship from Ilja Dragunov. On the November 7 episode of SmackDown, he saved Cody Rhodes from Black and Drew McIntyre. On the January 2, 2026 episode of SmackDown, Priest defeated Black in an Ambulance match, ending their feud. At the Royal Rumble on January 31, Priest entered the match at number 7 being eliminated by newcomer Royce Keys.

Following the Royal Rumble, Priest began teaming with R-Truth. They won the WWE Tag Team Championships on March 20 from MFTs (Tama Tonga and JC Mateo). Priest made his Lucha Libre AAA Worldwide (AAA) debut on the July 4 episode of Lucha Libre AAA on Fox. On the August 14 episode of SmackDown, Priest and Truth lost the titles back to The MFTs also involving The War Raiders ending their reign at 147 days. On the September 11 episode of SmackDown, Priest turned heel and attacked Truth after the duo failed to win the AAA World Tag Team Championship from the War Raiders.

== Professional wrestling style and persona ==
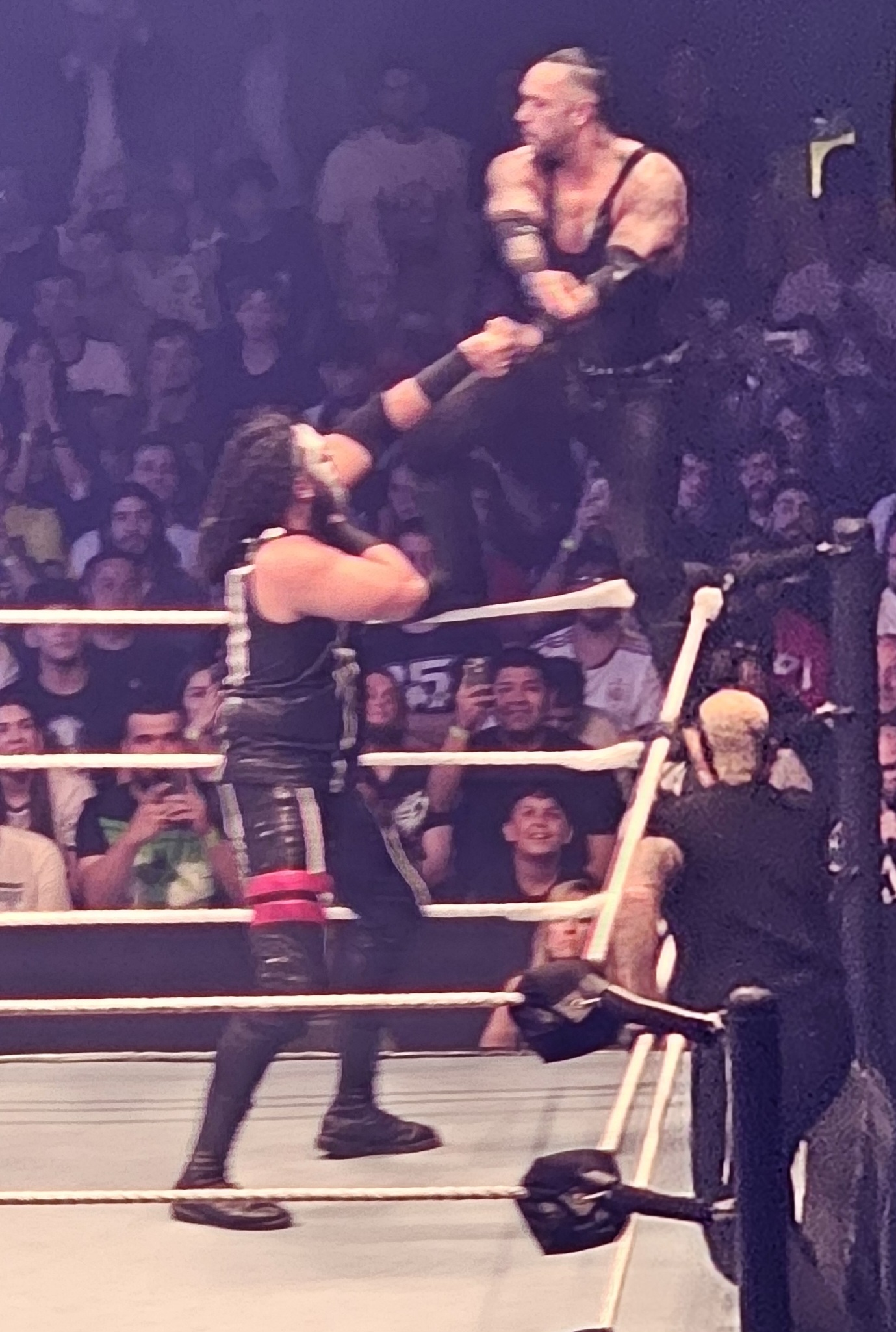
Priest performing the Old School on Talla Tonga

Martínez is known for his deep voice, which has helped him in his promos to maintain his menacing, dark character. In WWE, "Damian Priest" was previously intended to be a similar, but darker, more intense character than the "Punishment Martinez" incarnation he has represented previously in other promotions. However, his character gradually evolved and developed a more machismo, rockstar-like attitude that pursues more fame, recognition and success, further emphasized by portraying bars, parties and women frequently with him in backstage segments. Therefore, he has been referred to as "The Archer of Infamy".

His wrestling style involves various power moves as well as high-flying moves, and his striking is heavily influenced by his background in martial arts. He uses the Razor's Edge (a crucifix powerbomb, inherited from his childhood wrestling idol Razor Ramon) and a release suplex slam called the Broken Arrow. For the longest time, his finisher was a rolling cutter called The Reckoning. Priest now utilizes a sitout chokeslam called the South of Heaven (named after the Slayer album and song of the same name) as his finisher, which he had originally used during his time with Ring of Honor before using it again after joining The Judgment Day in 2022.

== Personal life ==
Martinez is a melophile, being heavily influenced by rock and heavy metal music. Some of his favorite bands include Slayer, Pantera, Anthrax and Iron Maiden. He and his family have known and interacted with various music bands and personalities, like Bad Bunny, and Dee Snider and Eddie Ojeda of Twisted Sister

Martinez revealed on the After The Bell podcast that he is a fan of short range combat because of his collection of weapons, particularly katanas, nunchucks, sai, and other Martial Arts weapons, which he showcases in his home. He is also an avid supporter of the New York Yankees.

Martinez cites Pedro Morales, Scott Hall and The Undertaker as his inspirations in wrestling.

In 2026, Martinez voiced The Hood in the video game Marvel Rivals.

== Championships and accomplishments ==
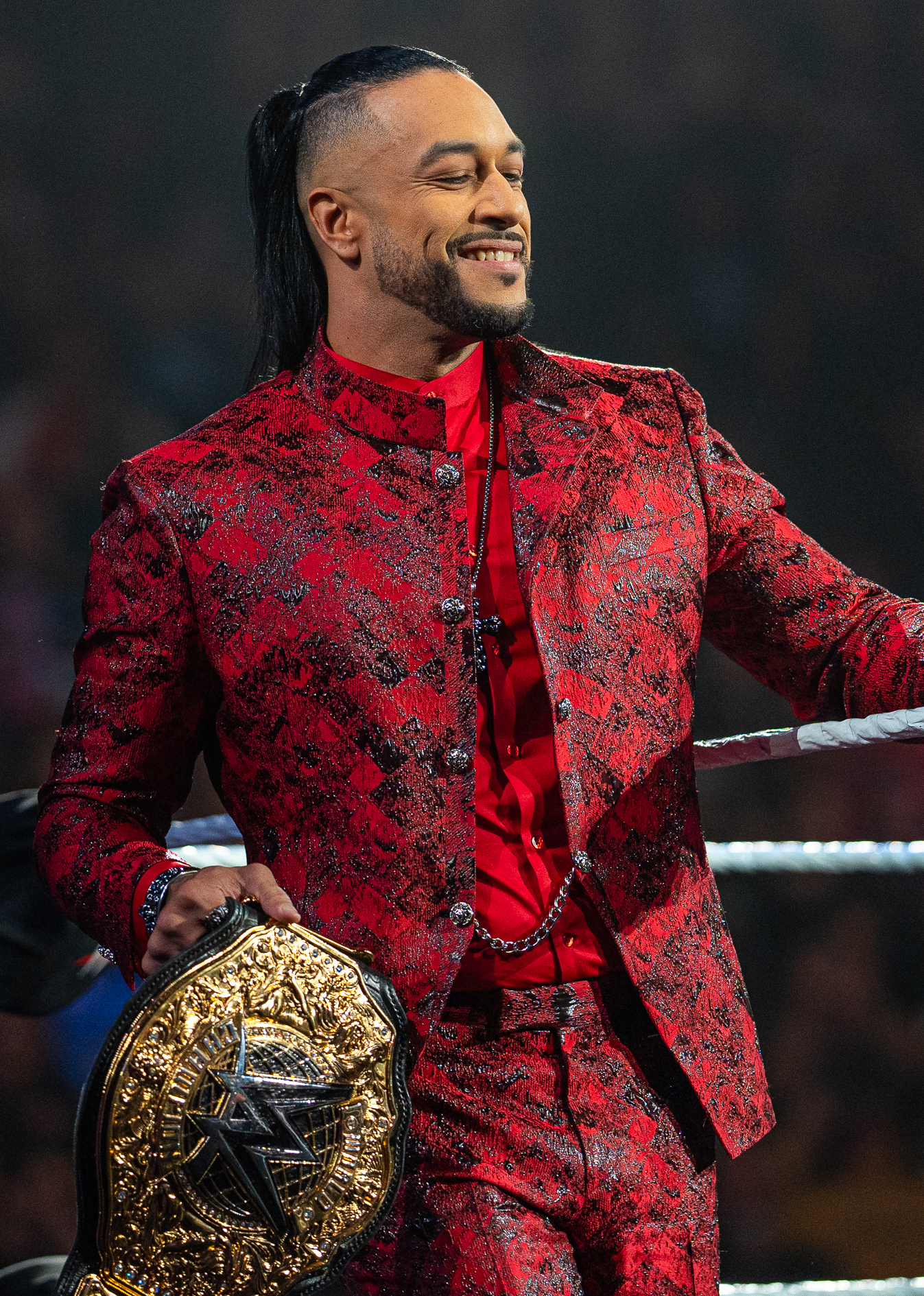
Priest is a former World Heavyweight Champion

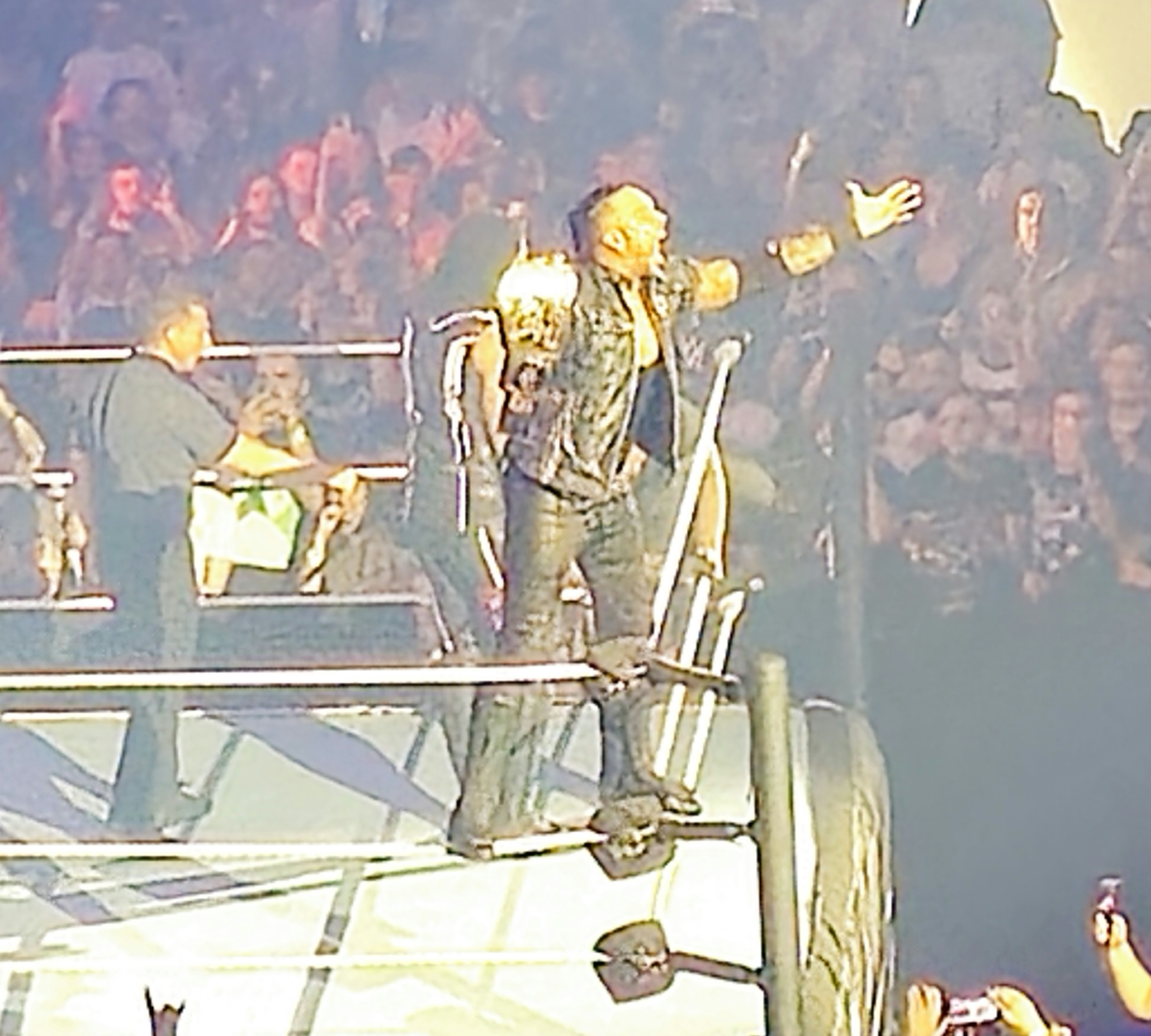
Priest won the WWE Tag Team Championship three times. Shown with the title in 2026

- Bronx Walk of Fame
  - Awarded a street named after him on the Bronx Walk of Fame (2025)
- Keystone Pro Wrestling
  - KPW Big Monster Glazer Championship (1 time)
  - KPW Tag Team Championship (1 time) – with Matthew Riddle
- Monster Factory Pro Wrestling
  - MFPW Heavyweight Championship (3 times)
  - MFPW Tag Team Championship (2 times) – with Brolly (1) and Q. T. Marshall (1)
  - MFPW Invitational Cup (2016)
- New York Post
  - Faction of the Year (2023) as part of The Judgment Day
- Pro Wrestling Illustrated
  - Faction of the Year (2023) as part of The Judgment Day
  - Ranked No. 6 of the top 500 singles wrestlers in the PWI 500 in 2024
- Ring of Honor
  - ROH World Television Championship (1 time)
  - Survival of the Fittest (2017)
- Wrestling Observer Newsletter
  - Worst Match of the Year (2021) vs. The Miz at WrestleMania Backlash
- WWE
  - World Heavyweight Championship (1 time)
  - WWE United States Championship (1 time)
  - NXT North American Championship (1 time)
  - WWE Raw Tag Team Championship (2 times) – with Finn Bálor
  - WWE Tag Team Championship (Note: Priest's first two reigns occurred when the title was known as the SmackDown Tag Team Championship.) (3 times) – with Finn Bálor (2) and R-Truth (1)
  - Men's Money in the Bank (2023)
  - Slammy Award (1 time)
    - Faction of the Year (2024) – as a member of The Judgment Day
