= Survival of the Fittest (2017) =

2017 Ring of Honor event

- Promotion: Ring of Honor
- Date: November 17, 2017; November 18, 2017; November 19, 2017
- City: San Antonio, Texas; Dallas, Texas; Oklahoma City, Oklahoma
- Venue: Austin Highway Event Center; Gilley's Dallas; Cox Convention Center
- Attendance: Night 1: 600-700; Night 2: 800-1,000; Night 3: 500-600

Event chronology
← Previous; ROH Elite	Next → Final Battle

Survival of the Fittest chronology
← Previous; 2016	Next → 2018

Survival of the Fittest (2017) was a three-night, three-city professional wrestling event produced by the American wrestling promotion Ring of Honor, the 12th Survival of the Fittest. It took place on November 17, 2017, at the Austin Highway Event Center in San Antonio, Texas, November 18, 2017, at Gilley's Dallas in Dallas, Texas and November 19, 2017, at the Cox Convention Center in Oklahoma City, Oklahoma.

The event also was notable for actor Stephen Amell, who was previously announced as the host for the first night of the tour, joining the Bullet Club stable and wrestling in the show's main event.

== Background ==
Survival of The Fittest featured professional wrestling matches that involved wrestlers from pre-existing scripted feuds or storylines that played out on ROH's television program, Ring of Honor Wrestling. Wrestlers portrayed heroes (faces) or villains (heels) as they followed a series of events that built tension and culminated in a wrestling match or series of matches.

Survival of the Fittest is an annual tournament held by ROH. For the 2017 event, the winners from designated tournament matches in Night 1 at San Antonio, Texas and Night 2 at Dallas, Texas advanced to a 6-Man Elimination Match on Night 3 in Oklahoma City, Oklahoma, and the winner of that match was declared Survivor of the Fittest, and received a future ROH World Championship match.

=== 2017 Survival of the Fittest tournament participants ===
- Beer City Bruiser
- Cheeseburger
- Flip Gordon
- Jay Lethal
- Jonathan Gresham
- Josh Woods
- Matt Taven
- Punishment Martinez
- Shane Taylor
- Silas Young
- T. K. O'Ryan
- Vinny Marseglia

== Results ==
=== Night 1 - San Antonio, TX ===
No.	Results	Stipulations	Times1:06
1^{D}	Cheeseburger defeated Jastin Taylor	Singles match	11:05
2	Silas Young defeated Josh Woods	First round match in the 2017 Survival of the Fittest tournament	12:03
3	Shane Taylor defeated Beer City Bruiser	First round match in the 2017 Survival of the Fittest tournament	10:03
4	Punishment Martinez defeated Jay Lethal	First round match in the 2017 Survival of the Fittest tournament	14:46
5	The Kingdom (Matt Taven, T. K. O'Ryan and Vinny Marseglia) defeated Search and Destroy (Alex Shelley, Chris Sabin and Jonathan Gresham)	Six-man tag team match	17:45
6	Deonna Purrazzo defeated Britt Baker	Singles match	15:43
7	Esfinge and Rey Cometa defeated The Dawgs (Rhett Titus and Will Ferrara)	Tag team match	10:04
8	Kenny King (c) defeated Joey Ryan	Singles match for the ROH World Television Championship	18:57
9	Dalton Castle defeated Marty Scurll	Singles match	17:53
10	Bullet Club (Cody, Kenny Omega, Matt Jackson, Nick Jackson and Stephen Amell) defeated The Addiction (Christopher Daniels and Frankie Kazarian), Flip Gordon and Scorpio Sky	Five-on-four handicap match	35:56
(c) / – the champion(s) heading into the match; D / – this was a dark match

=== Night 2 - Dallas, TX ===
No.	Results	Stipulations	Times
1^{D}	Andy Dalton defeated Lou Gotti	Singles match	9:32
2	Jonathan Gresham defeated Vinny Marseglia	First round match in the 2017 Survival of the Fittest tournament	13:56
3	Flip Gordon defeated T. K. O'Ryan	First round match in the 2017 Survival of the Fittest tournament	14:00
4	Matt Taven defeated Cheeseburger	First round match in the 2017 Survival of the Fittest tournament	00:43
5	Deonna Purrazzo defeated Karen Q	No disqualification match	13:43
6	The Motor City Machine Guns (Alex Shelley and Chris Sabin) (c) defeated Esfinge and Rey Cometa, The Dawgs (Rhett Titus and Will Ferrara) and Silas Young and Beer City Bruiser	Four corner survival tag team match for the ROH World Tag Team Championship	23:45
7	Marty Scurll defeated Josh Woods	Singles match	11:33
8	Kenny King (c) defeated Scorpio Sky	Singles match for the ROH World Television Championship	16:34
9	Jay Lethal and Dalton Castle defeated The Young Bucks (Matt Jackson and Nick Jackson)	Tag team match	13:30
10	Cody (c) defeated Christopher Daniels	Texas Death match for the ROH World Championship	29:52
(c) / – the champion(s) heading into the match; D / – this was a dark match

=== Night 3 - Oklahoma City, OK ===
No.	Results	Stipulations	Times
1^{D}	The Dawgs (Rhett Titus and Will Ferrara) defeated Ky-ote and Chandler Hopkins	Tag team match	22:47
2	Jay Lethal defeated Josh Woods	Singles match	22:45
3	Cheeseburger and Gregory James ended in a no contest	Singles match	1:02
4	Marty Scurll defeated Rhett Titus	Singles match	15:04
5	Joey Ryan defeated Kikutaro	Singles match	19:07
6	Cody defeated Beer City Bruiser (with Silas Young)	Singles match	11:28
7	Deonna Purrazzo defeated Madison Rayne	Singles match	17:04
8	Dalton Castle defeated Christopher Daniels	Singles match	21:10
9	The Young Bucks (Matt Jackson and Nick Jackson) defeated The Kingdom (T. K. O'Ryan and Vinny Marseglia)	Tag team match	18:02
10	Punishment Martinez defeated Flip Gordon, Silas Young, Jonathan Gresham, Shane Taylor and Matt Taven	Survival of the Fittest tournament final Six-way elimination match Winner receives an ROH World Championship match	46:45
D / – this was a dark match

=== Survival of the Fittest finals ===
Eliminated	Wrestler	Eliminated by	Time
1	Matt Taven	N/A (Disqualification)	–
2	Shane Taylor	Jonathan Gresham and Flip Gordon	–
3	Jonathan Gresham	Punishment Martinez	–
4	Silas Young	Punishment Martinez	–
5	Flip Gordon	Punishment Martinez	46:45
Winner	Punishment Martinez	—N/a	46:45
