= Survival of the Fittest (2018) =

- Promotion: Ring of Honor
- Date: November 4, 2018
- City: Columbus, Ohio
- Venue: Express Live!
- Attendance: 800

Event chronology
| ← Previous; Sea of Honor | Next → Global Wars |

Survival of the Fittest chronology
| ← Previous; 2017 | Next → 2021 |

Survival of the Fittest (2018) was a professional wrestling livestreaming event produced by the American wrestling promotion Ring of Honor. This was the 13th Survival of the Fittest tournament, and it took place on November 4, 2018, at the Express Live! in Columbus, Ohio. The show was streamed live on Honor Club.

== Production ==
=== Background ===
Survival of the Fittest is an annual tournament held by ROH. For the 2018 event, the winners from designated tournament matches advanced to a 6-Man Elimination Match and the winner of that match was declared Survivor of the Fittest, and received a future ROH World Championship match.

=== Storylines ===
Survival of The Fittest featured professional wrestling matches that involved wrestlers from pre-existing scripted feuds or storylines that played out on ROH's television program, Ring of Honor Wrestling. Wrestlers portrayed heroes (faces) or villains (heels) as they followed a series of events that built tension and culminated in a wrestling match or series of matches.

== 2018 Survival of the Fittest tournament participants ==
- Andrew Everett*
- Beer City Bruiser
- Christopher Daniels
- Colin Delaney*
- Dalton Castle
- Flip Gordon
- Guerrero Maya Jr.**
- Hangman Page
- Jonathan Gresham
- Luchasaurus*
- Marty Scurll
- PJ Black
- Silas Young
- Stuka Jr.**
- Tracy Williams

(*) - Free agent guest entrant

(**) - Works for Mexican promotion Consejo Mundial de Lucha Libre (CMLL), with which ROH has a partnership

== Results ==
| No. | Results | Stipulations | Times |
|---|---|---|---|
| 1 | Christopher Daniels defeated Beer City Bruiser | First round match in the 2018 Survival of the Fittest tournament | 1:52 |
| 2 | Hangman Page defeated Dalton Castle and Colin Delaney | First round match in the 2018 Survival of the Fittest tournament | 9:50 |
| 3 | Jonathan Gresham defeated Tracy Williams | First round match in the 2018 Survival of the Fittest tournament | 12:19 |
| 4 | Guerrero Maya Jr. defeated Andrew Everett and Flip Gordon | First round match in the 2018 Survival of the Fittest tournament | 9:21 |
| 5 | PJ Black defeated Luchasaurus | First round match in the 2018 Survival of the Fittest tournament | 6:56 |
| 6 | Marty Scurll defeated Silas Young and Stuka Jr. | First round match in the 2018 Survival of the Fittest tournament | 8:30 |
| 7 | Madison Rayne defeated Dr. Britt Baker | Singles match | 7:20 |
| 8 | The Kingdom (Matt Taven, T. K. O'Ryan and Vinny Marseglia) defeated The Elite (Cody, Matt Jackson and Nick Jackson) (c) | Six-man tag team match for the ROH World Six-Man Tag Team Championship | 14:47 |
| 9 | Jay Lethal and Jeff Cobb defeated SoCal Uncensored (Frankie Kazarian and Scorpio Sky) | Tag team match | 18:14 |
| 10 | Marty Scurll defeated Christopher Daniels, Hangman Page, PJ Black, Jonathan Gresham and Guerrero Maya Jr. | Survival of the Fittest Six-way elimination match Winner receives an ROH World Championship match | 24:31 |
(c) / – the champion(s) heading into the match

=== Survival of the Fittest finals ===
| Eliminated | Wrestler | Eliminated by | Method | Time |
|---|---|---|---|---|
| 1 | Guerrero Maya Jr. | PJ Black | Pinned after a powerbomb | 5:18 |
| 2 | Jonathan Gresham | Hangman Page | Pinned after the Rite of Passage | 7:20 |
| 3 | PJ Black | Marty Scurll | Pinned with an inside cradle | 17:46 |
| 4 | Hangman Page | Christopher Daniels | Pinned after the Best Moonsault Ever | 23:30 |
| 5 | Christopher Daniels | Marty Scurll | Pinned after the Graduation | 24:31 |
| Winner | Marty Scurll | —N/a | | 24:31 |
