= Survival of the Fittest (2015) =

2-night Ring of Honor event

- Promotion: Ring of Honor
- Date: Night 1: November 13, 2015; Night 2: November 14, 2015
- City: Night 1: Milwaukee, Wisconsin; Night 2: Hopkins, Minnesota
- Venue: Night 1: Turner Hall Ballroom; Night 2: Hopkins Eisenhower Community Center
- Attendance: Night 1: 900; Night 2: 850

Pay-per-view chronology
← Previous; Glory By Honor XIV	Next → Final Battle

Survival of the Fittest chronology
← Previous; 2014	Next → 2016

Survival of the Fittest (2015) was a two night, two city professional wrestling event produced by the U.S.-based wrestling promotion Ring of Honor, the 10th Survival of the Fittest. It took place on November 13, 2015 at the Turner Hall Ballroom in Milwaukee, Wisconsin and November 14 at the Hopkins Eisenhower Community Center in Hopkins, Minnesota.

== Storylines ==
Survival of The Fittest (2015) featured professional wrestling matches that involve wrestlers from pre-existing scripted feuds or storylines that play out on ROH's television program, Ring of Honor Wrestling. Wrestlers will portray heroes (faces) or villains (heels) as they follow a series of events that build tension and culminate in a wrestling match or series of matches.

Survival of the Fittest is an annual tournament held by ROH. For the 2015 event, the winners from designated tournament matches in Milwaukee, Wisconsin advanced to a 6-Man Elimination Match the following night in Hopkins, Minnesota, and the winner of that match will be declared Survivor of the Fittest, and receive a future ROH World Championship match.

After winning a Four Corner Survival match to become the number one contender at All Star Extravaganza VII, AJ Styles will challenge reigning ROH World Champion Jay Lethal for the title in December at Final Battle. As a prelude to that match, Lethal - along with his House of Truth teammates Donovan Dijak and Joey Daddiego - wrestled Styles and his Bullet Club teammates The Young Bucks (Nick and Matt Jackson) in a six-man tag team match during Night 1 of Survival of the Fittest, which resulted in Styles pinning Lethal with his finishing move, the Styles Clash, thus giving his team the victory.

=== 2015 Survival of the Fittest tournament participants ===
- A. C. H.
- Adam Cole
- Adam Page
- Cedric Alexander
- Christopher Daniels
- Dalton Castle
- Frankie Kazarian
- Hanson
- Jay Briscoe
- Kenny King
- Mark Briscoe
- Matt Sydal
- Michael Elgin
- Moose
- Raymond Rowe
- Rhett Titus
- Roderick Strong
- Silas Young

== Results ==
=== Night 1 - Milwaukee, WI ===
No.	Results	Stipulations	Times
1^{D}	Cheeseburger defeated Ken Phoenix	Singles match	—
2	Christopher Daniels defeated Mark Briscoe, Hanson and Kenny King	Four corner survival match; first round match in the 2015 Survival of the Fittest tournament	12:28
3	Roderick Strong defeated Cedric Alexander (with Veda Scott)	Singles match; first round match in the 2015 Survival of the Fittest tournament	15:27
4	Silas Young (with Beer City Bruiser) defeated Dalton Castle and Adam Page (with B. J. Whitmer and Colby Corino)	Three-way match; first round match in the 2015 Survival of the Fittest tournament	7:11
5	The Kingdom (Matt Taven and Michael Bennett) (c) (with Maria Kanellis) defeated reDRagon (Bobby Fish and Kyle O'Reilly)	Tag team match for the ROH World Tag Team Championship	13:52
6	Jay Briscoe defeated Frankie Kazarian, Raymond Rowe and Rhett Titus	Four corner survival match; first round match in the 2015 Survival of the Fittest tournament	16:40
7	Michael Elgin defeated Adam Cole and Moose (with Stokely Hathaway)	Three-way match; first round match in the 2015 Survival of the Fittest tournament	13:16
8	A. C. H. defeated Matt Sydal	Singles match Match 5 in the Best of 5 Series; first round match in the 2015 Survival of the Fittest tournament	19:24
9	Bullet Club (A.J. Styles and The Young Bucks (Matt Jackson and Nick Jackson)) defeated The House of Truth (Jay Lethal, Donovan Dijak and Joey Daddiego) (with Truth Martini and Taeler Hendrix)	Six-man tag team match	16:30
(c) / – the champion(s) heading into the match; D / – this was a dark match

=== Night 2 - Hopkins, MN ===
No.	Results	Stipulations	Times
1^{D}	Shaheem Ali defeated Kevin Lee Davidson	Singles match	—
2	Cedric Alexander (with Veda Scott) defeated Will Ferrara	Singles match	9:42
3	Dalton Castle defeated Adam Page (with B. J. Whitmer and Colby Corino)	Singles match	11:02
4	Mark Briscoe defeated Frankie Kazarian	Singles match	10:50
5	The Kingdom (Adam Cole, Matt Taven and Michael Bennett) (with Maria Kanellis) defeated Moose and War Machine (Hanson and Raymond Rowe) (with Stokely Hathaway)	Six-man tag team match	18:09
6	Joey Daddiego (with Truth Martini) defeated Cheeseburger	Singles match	5:08
7	The Young Bucks (Matt Jackson and Nick Jackson) defeated The All Night Express (Rhett Titus and Kenny King)	Tag Team match	11:07
8	A.J. Styles defeated Matt Sydal	Singles match	11:20
9	reDRagon (Bobby Fish and Kyle O'Reilly) defeated The House of Truth (Jay Lethal and Donovan Dijak) (with Truth Martini and Taeler Hendrix)	Tag team match	13:34
10	Michael Elgin defeated Jay Briscoe, Christopher Daniels, A. C. H. and Silas Young (with Beer City Bruiser)	Survival of the Fittest tournament final Five-way elimination match* Winner will receive an ROH World Championship match	45:30
D / – this was a dark match

(*) - Roderick Strong had qualified to advance to the tournament final, but could not wrestle due to a concussion, making it a five-way match.

=== Survival of the Fittest finals ===
Eliminated	Wrestler	Eliminated by	Method	Time
1	Silas Young	ACH	Pinned after a German suplex	–
2	ACH	Christopher Daniels	Pinned after the Best Moonsault Ever	–
3	Christopher Daniels	Jay Briscoe	Pinned after the Jay-Driller	–
4	Jay Briscoe	Michael Elgin	Pinned after the Burning Hammer	45:30
Winner	Michael Elgin	—N/a		45:30
