= Chandler Hopkins =

American professional wrestler

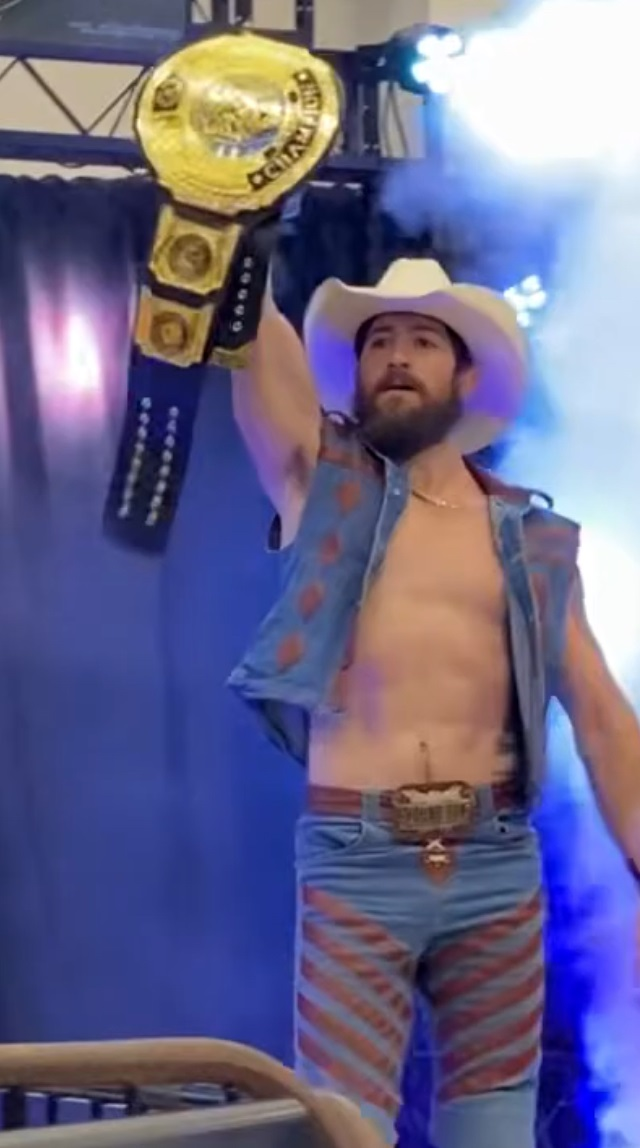
- Chandler Hopkins at a Pale Pro Wrestling event in Arlington, Texas, 2022

Personal information
- Born: June 13 Ardmore, Oklahoma, U.S.

Professional wrestling career
- Ring name(s): Chandler Hopkins; Billy Marks
- Billed height: 6 ft 1 in (185 cm)
- Billed weight: 185 lb (84 kg)
- Debut: September 2016

Chandler Hopkins is an American professional wrestler known for his time on the independent circuit in Texas, Oklahoma and Florida. He has made appearances for Ring of Honor, Major League Wrestling, All Elite Wrestling and Total Nonstop Action Wrestling (TNA).

== Career ==
Hopkins made his debut on the independent circuit in 2016. On November 19, 2017, Hopkins wrestled at Ring of Honor's Survival of the Fittest, teaming with Ky-ote, losing to Rhett Titus and Will Ferrara,

On January 11, 2020, Hopkins made his Major League Wrestling debut on MLW Fusion, losing to Low Ki. Throughout 2021 and 2022 Hopkins made several appearances for All Elite Wrestling, mainly on AEW Dark. He made his television debut on June 5, 2021 episode of Dynamite, losing to Lance Archer.

== Personal life ==
As of July 2022, he is in a relationship with AEW and ROH star Red Velvet.

== Championships and accomplishments ==
- World Class Revolution
  - WCR Revolutionary Championship (1 time)
- Texoma Pro Wrestling
  - Unified Texoma Pro Tag Team Championship (1 time) – with Malico
- Pale Pro Wrestling
  - Pale Pro Championship (1 time)
- Metroplex Wrestling
  - MPX Addicts Championship (1 time)
  - MPX Tag Team Championship (1 time) – with Cody Dickson
- Reality of Wrestling
  - ROW Television Championship (1 time)
- Gulf Coast Wrestling Alliance
  - GCWA Heavyweight Championship (2 time)
  - GCWA Extreme Championship (1 time)
