= Survival of the Fittest (2016) =

- Promotion: Ring of Honor
- Date: Night 1: November 3, 2016; Night 2: November 4, 2016
- City: Night 1: Arlington, Texas; Night 2: San Antonio, Texas
- Venue: Night 1: Arlington Convention Center; Night 2: San Antonio Shrine Auditorium
- Attendance: Night 1: 400-500; Night 2: N/A

Pay-per-view chronology
← Previous; Glory By Honor XV	Next → Final Battle

Survival of the Fittest chronology
← Previous; 2015	Next → 2017

Survival of the Fittest (2016) was a two-night, two-city professional wrestling event produced by the U.S.-based wrestling promotion Ring of Honor, the 11th Survival of the Fittest. It took place on November 3, 2016 at the Arlington Convention Center in Arlington, Texas and November 4 at the San Antonio Shrine Auditorium in San Antonio, Texas.

== Storylines ==
Survival of The Fittest (2016) featured professional wrestling matches that involved wrestlers from pre-existing scripted feuds or storylines that played out on ROH's television program, Ring of Honor Wrestling. Wrestlers portrayed heroes (faces) or villains (heels) as they followed a series of events that built tension and culminated in a wrestling match or series of matches.

Survival of the Fittest is an annual tournament held by ROH. For the 2016 event, the winners from designated tournament matches in Arlington, Texas advanced to a 6-Man Elimination Match the following night in San Antonio, and the winner of that match was declared Survivor of the Fittest, and received a future ROH World Championship match.

=== 2016 Survival of the Fittest tournament participants ===
- Bobby Fish
- Cheeseburger
- Chris Sabin
- Colt Cabana
- Dalton Castle
- Donovan Dijak
- Jax Dane
- Hangman Page
- Kenny King
- Lio Rush
- Misterioso Jr.
- Punishment Martinez
- Rhett Titus
- Sho
- Silas Young
- The Panther
- Will Ferrara
- Yohey

== Results ==
=== Night 1 – Arlington, TX ===
No.	Results	Stipulations
1	The Panther defeated Will Ferrara, Silas Young and Yohey	Four corner survival match; first round match in the 2016 Survival of the Fittest tournament
2	Jax Dane defeated Donovan Dijak	Singles match; first round match in the 2016 Survival of the Fittest tournament
3	Punishment Martinez defeated Colt Cabana and Cheeseburger	Three-way match; first round match in the 2016 Survival of the Fittest tournament
4	Bobby Fish defeated Kenny King (with Caprice Coleman)	Singles match; first round match in the 2016 Survival of the Fittest tournament
5	Dalton Castle defeated Rhett Titus (with Caprice Coleman) and Chris Sabin	Three-way match; first round match in the 2016 Survival of the Fittest tournament
6	Lio Rush defeated Misterioso Jr., Hangman Page and Sho	Four corner survival match; first round match in the 2016 Survival of the Fittest tournament
7	Kyle O'Reilly defeated Christopher Daniels (with Frankie Kazarian)	Singles match
8	The Briscoes (Jay Briscoe and Mark Briscoe) defeated War Machine (Hanson and Raymond Rowe) and Keith Lee and Shane Taylor	Three-way tag team match

=== Night 2 – San Antonio, TX ===
No.	Results	Stipulations
1^{D}	Cheeseburger and Will Ferrara defeated Andy Dalton and Scorpio Sky	Tag team match
2	The Cabinet (Rhett Titus, Kenny King and Caprice Coleman) defeated The Tempura Boyz (Sho and Yohey) and Misterioso Jr.	Six-man tag team match
3	Silas Young defeated Mark Briscoe	Singles match
4	Hangman Page defeated Donovan Dijak	Singles match
5	Colt Cabana defeated Chris Sabin (with Alex Shelley)	Singles match
6	Keith Lee and Shane Taylor defeated War Machine (Hanson and Raymond Rowe)	No Rules Tag team match
7	Kyle O'Reilly defeated Frankie Kazarian	Singles match
8	Jay Briscoe defeated Christopher Daniels	Singles match
9	Bobby Fish defeated Lio Rush, Punishment Martinez, Jax Dane, Dalton Castle and The Panther	Survival of the Fittest tournament final Six-way elimination match Winner received an ROH World Championship match
D / – this was a dark match

=== Survival of the Fittest finals ===
Eliminated	Wrestler	Eliminated by	Time
1	The Panther	Dalton Castle	–
2	Dalton Castle	Punishment Martinez	–
3	Jax Dane	Lio Rush	–
4	Punishment Martinez	Lio Rush	–
5	Lio Rush	Bobby Fish	29:57
Winner	Bobby Fish	—N/a	29:57
