= ROH Survival of the Fittest =

Professional wrestling tournament held by Ring of Honor / pay-per-view event series

Survival of the Fittest is a professional wrestling tournament originally held by Ring of Honor (ROH), and later also by sister promotion All Elite Wrestling (AEW). The inaugural tournament took place in 2004 and, with exceptions (2008, 2013, 2019–2020, 2022), has become an annual tradition in ROH ever since. In 2026, ROH's sister promotion AEW utilized the match for the first time.

== Format ==
Originally established for the American promotion Ring of Honor (ROH), wrestlers compete in a variety of "qualifying" matches, usually either singles matches or tag team matches, with the winner(s) of each match advancing to an elimination match where the last remaining competitor is deemed the Survival of the Fittest winner, and receives a future ROH World Championship match (except the 2023 and 2024 tournaments which were for the ROH World Television Championship). In 2026, the tournament was utilized by sister promotion All Elite Wrestling (AEW) to determine the next holder of the women's AEW TBS Championship.

== History ==
The tournament setup is based on Maryland Championship Wrestling's Shane Shamrock Memorial Cup, as ROH was to continue the Shane Shamrock Memorial Cup following the shutdown of MCW in 2003. However, following a controversy with ROH's owner in early 2004, MCW dropped their association with Ring of Honor, and ROH renamed the already scheduled tournament "Survival of the Fittest".

In 2019, it was announced the event would take place on November 9 and 10, but the shows were ultimately cancelled.

In 2022, ROH was acquired by Tony Khan, the president and owner of AEW. After the women's AEW TBS Championship was vacated in late May 2026, AEW introduced the Survival of the Fittest match to determine the title's next holder, culminating on the July 1 episode of AEW Dynamite.

== List of winners ==
=== ROH ===
- 2004 – Bryan Danielson
- 2005 –Roderick Strong
- 2006 – Delirious
- 2007 – Chris Hero
- 2009 – Tyler Black
- 2010 – Eddie Edwards
- 2011 – Michael Elgin
- 2012 – Jay Lethal
- 2014 – Adam Cole
- 2015 – Michael Elgin (2)
- 2016 – Bobby Fish
- 2017 – Punishment Martinez
- 2018 – Marty Scurll
- 2021 – Bandido
- 2023 – Kyle Fletcher
- 2024 July – Atlantis Jr.
- 2024 December – Komander
- 2025 – Bandido (2)
- 2026 – Athena

=== AEW ===
- 2026 – Hikaru Shida

=== Championship match for winner ===
Men's
– Championship victory
– Championship match loss
– Championship match draw/no contest
– Vacated championship match victory
Women's
– Women's championship victory
– Women's championship match loss
– Women's championship match draw/no contest
– Women's vacated championship match victory

#	Winner	Event	Year	Championship match
1	Bryan Danielson	Midnight Express Reunion	2004	Danielson unsuccessfully challenged Samoa Joe for the ROH World Championship.
2	Roderick Strong	This Means War	2005	Strong unsuccessfully challenged Bryan Danielson for the ROH World Championship.
3	Delirious	Honor Reclaims Boston	2006	Delirious unsuccessfully challenged Bryan Danielson for the ROH World Championship.
4	Chris Hero	Glory By Honor IV - Night 1	2007	Hero unsuccessfully challenged Nigel McGuinness for the ROH World Championship.
5	Tyler Black	Final Battle	2009	Black wrestled ROH World Champion Austin Aries to a sixty-minute time limit draw. Black defeated Aries in a rematch to win the ROH World Championship at the 8th Anniversary Show.
6	Eddie Edwards	Manhattan Mayhem IV	2010	Edwards defeated Roderick Strong to win the ROH World Championship.
7	Michael Elgin	Showdown in the Sun - Night 2	2011	Elgin unsuccessfully challenged Davey Richards for the ROH World Championship.
8	Jay Lethal	11th Anniversary Show	2012	Lethal unsuccessfully challenged Kevin Steen for the ROH World Championship.
9	Adam Cole	Final Battle	2014	Cole unsuccessfully challenged Jay Briscoe in a Fight Without Honor for the ROH World Championship.
10	Michael Elgin (2)	All Star Extravaganza VIII	2015	Elgin unsuccessfully challenged Adam Cole for the ROH World Championship.
11	Bobby Fish	Manhattan Mayhem	2016	Fish unsuccessfully challenged Adam Cole for the ROH World Championship.
12	Punishment Martinez	Ring of Honor Wrestling (February 10, 2018)	2017	Martinez unsuccessfully challenged Dalton Castle for the ROH World Championship.
13	Marty Scurll	G1 Supercard	2018	Scurll challenged Jay Lethal in a three-way ladder match for the ROH World Championship, also involving Matt Taven. Taven won the match.
14	Bandido	Best in the World	2021	Bandido defeated Rush to win the ROH World Championship.
15	Kyle Fletcher	Final Battle	2023	Survivor of the Fittest for the vacant ROH World Television Championship. Fletcher defeated Komander, Lee Moriarty, Bryan Keith, Dalton Castle and Lee Johnson to win the championship.
16	Atlantis Jr.	Death Before Dishonor	2024	Survivor of the Fittest for the ROH World Television Championship. Atlantis Jr. defeated Shane Taylor, Brian Cage, Lee Johnson, Lio Rush, and Johnny TV to retain the championship.
17	Komander	Final Battle	2024	Survivor of the Fittest for the ROH World Television Championship. Komander defeated defending champion Brian Cage, Willie Mack, Mark Davis, AR Fox. and Blake Christian to win the championship.
18	Bandido (2)	Final Battle	2025	Survivor of the Fittest for the ROH World Championship. Bandido defeated Sammy Guevara, Blake Christian, The Beast Mortos, Hechicero, and Komander to retain the championship.
19	Athena	Supercard of Honor	2026	Defeated Maya World, Trish Adora, Yuka Sakazaki, Billie Starkz and Zayda Steel to retain the ROH Women's World Championship in the first ever Women's Survival of the Fittest Match in ROH history.
20	Hikaru Shida	AEW Dynamite	2026	Defeated Maika, Harley Cameron, Persephone, Queen Aminata, and Kris Statlander in AEW's first-ever Survival of the Fittest match to win the vacant AEW TBS Championship.

== Tournament results ==
=== 2004 ===
ROH's first Survival of the Fittest tournament took place on June 24, 2004 in Philadelphia, Pennsylvania.

- Qualifying match: Mark Briscoe defeated Alex Shelley to advance
- Qualifying match: Colt Cabana defeated Trent Acid to advance
- Qualifying match: Generation Next (Austin Aries and Roderick Strong) defeated John Walters and Josh Daniels
  - This match was originally scheduled to be a singles match between Walters and Aries, but was changed to a tag team match after Generation Next attacked Walters.
  - As a result of scoring the victory, Aries advances to the finals.
- Qualifying match: Homicide defeated Jay Briscoe to advance
- Qualifying match: Bryan Danielson defeated Jack Evans to advance
- Qualifying match: Samoa Joe defeated Matt Stryker to advance
- Final match: Bryan Danielson defeated Austin Aries, Colt Cabana, Homicide, Mark Briscoe and Samoa Joe in a Six-Way Elimination match to win Survival of the Fittest

Eliminated	Wrestler	Eliminated by	Method	Time
1	Samoa Joe	Colt Cabana	Pinned with a sunset flip	15:22
2	Colt Cabana	Mark Briscoe	Pinned after a shooting star press	17:06
3	Homicide	Mark Briscoe	Both men pinned each other	19:05
4	Mark Briscoe	Homicide	Both men pinned each other	19:05
5	Austin Aries	Bryan Danielson	Submitted to an Elevated Boston crab	42:28
Winner	Bryan Danielson	—N/a		42:28

=== 2005 ===
ROH's second Survival of the Fittest tournament took place on September 24, 2005 in Boston, Massachusetts.

- Qualifying match: Jay Lethal defeated Sal Rinauro to advance
- Qualifying match: Colt Cabana defeated Ricky Reyes to advance
- Qualifying match: Austin Aries defeated Jimmy Rave by disqualification to advance
- Qualifying match: Samoa Joe defeated Milano Collection A.T. to advance
- Qualifying match: Roderick Strong defeated Jerrelle Clark to advance
- Qualifying match: Christopher Daniels defeated James Gibson to advance
- Final match: Roderick Strong defeated Austin Aries, Christopher Daniels, Colt Cabana, Jay Lethal and Samoa Joe in a Six-Way Elimination match to win Survival of the Fittest.

Eliminated	Wrestler	Eliminated by	Method	Time
1	Samoa Joe	Roderick Strong	Pinned after Daniels hit Joe with the Best Moonsault Ever	13:57
2	Christopher Daniels	Austin Aries	Pinned with a sunset flip	19:12
3	Jay Lethal	Roderick Strong	Pinned after Death by Roderick	31:23
4	Colt Cabana	Roderick Strong	Pinned after a pildedriver	35:51
5	Austin Aries	Roderick Strong	Submitted to the Stronghold	50:30
Winner	Roderick Strong	—N/a		50:30

=== 2006 ===
ROH's third Survival of the Fittest tournament took place on October 6, 2006 in Cleveland, Ohio.

- Qualifying match: Matt Sydal defeated Davey Richards to advance
- Qualifying match: Delirious defeated Jimmy Rave to advance
- Qualifying match: Austin Aries defeated Christopher Daniels to advance
- Qualifying match: The Briscoe Brothers (Jay and Mark) defeated Homicide and Roderick Strong to advance
- Qualifying match: Bryan Danielson vs. Samoa Joe ended in a 20-minute time limit draw
  - As a result of a draw, neither wrestler advances
- Final match: Delirious defeated Austin Aries, Jay Briscoe, Mark Briscoe and Matt Sydal in a Five-Way Elimination match to win Survival of the Fittest.

Eliminated	Wrestler	Eliminated by	Method	Time
1	Austin Aries	Jay Briscoe and Mark Briscoe	Pinned after a Doomsday Device	11:17
2	Jay Briscoe	Matt Sydal	Pinned with a roll-up	19:04
3	Mark Briscoe	Matt Sydal	Pinned after the Shooting Sydal Press	23:06
4	Matt Sydal	Delirious	Submitted to the Cobra Stretch	34:51
Winner	Delirious	—N/a		34:51

=== 2007 ===
ROH's fourth Survival of the Fittest tournament took place on October 19, 2007 in Las Vegas, Nevada.

- Qualifying match: Roderick Strong defeated Brent Albright to advance
- Qualifying match: Chris Hero defeated Karl Anderson to advance
- Qualifying match: Rocky Romero defeated T. J. Perkins to advance
- Qualifying match: Austin Aries defeated Delirious to advance
- Qualifying match: Claudio Castagnoli defeated Davey Richards to advance
- Qualifying match: Bryan Danielson vs. Nigel McGuinness ended in a 20-minute time limit draw
  - As a result of a draw, neither wrestler advances.
- Qualifying match: Human Tornado defeated Shane Hagadorn and Tony Kozina
  - This was originally scheduled as a non-tournament match, but turned into one as a result of Bryan Danielson and Nigel McGuinness wrestling to a draw.
- Survival of the Fittest: Chris Hero defeated Austin Aries, Claudio Castagnoli, Human Tornado, Rocky Romero and Roderick Strong in a Six-Way Elimination match to win Survival of the Fittest.

Eliminated	Wrestler	Eliminated by	Method	Time
1	Human Tornado	Chris Hero	Pinned after the Hero's Welcome	3:58
2	Rocky Romero	Chris Hero	Pinned after Aries hit Romero with a 450° splash	13:32
3	Austin Aries	Chris Hero	Pinned with a roll-up	15:38
4	Colt Cabana	Chris Hero	Pinned after the Hero's Welcome	35:51
5	Claudio Castagnoli	Chris Hero	Passed out in the Hangman's Clutch	50:30
Winner	Chris Hero	—N/a		50:30

=== 2009 ===
ROH's fifth Survival of the Fittest tournament took place on October 10, 2009 in Indianapolis, Indiana.

- Due to his performance in an ROH World Championship match the night before, ROH Executive Producer Jim Cornette gave Delirious a bye into the finals of the tournament.
- Qualifying match: Roderick Strong defeated Rhett Titus to advance
- Qualifying match: Tyler Black defeated Kenny King to advance
- Qualifying match: Colt Cabana defeated Kevin Steen to advance
- Qualifying match: Claudio Castagnoli defeated Petey Williams to advance
- Qualifying match: Chris Hero defeated Kenny Omega to advance
- Final match: Tyler Black defeated Chris Hero, Colt Cabana, Claudio Castagnoli, Delirious and Roderick Strong in a Six-Way Elimination match to win Survival of the Fittest.

Eliminated	Wrestler	Eliminated by	Method	Time
1	Claudio Castagnoli	Colt Cabana	Pinned after Hero hit Castagnoli with a rolling elbow	23:00
2	Colt Cabana	Delirious	Pinned with a roll-up	23:05
3	Delirious	Roderick Strong	Pinned after the Sick Kick	24:59
4	Chris Hero	Tyler Black	Pinned with God's Last Gift	28:38
5	Roderick Strong	Tyler Black	Pinned after the Avada Kedavra	39:36
Winner	Tyler Black	—N/a		39:36

=== 2010 ===
ROH's sixth Survival of the Fittest tournament took place on November 12, 2010 in Dearborn, Michigan.

- Qualifying match: Rhett Titus defeated Colt Cabana to advance
- Qualifying match: Claudio Castagnoli defeated Grizzly Redwood to advance
- Qualifying match: Kevin Steen defeated Kyle O'Reilly to advance
- Qualifying match: Adam Cole defeated Steve Corino to advance
- Qualifying match: Eddie Edwards defeated Chris Hero to advance
- Qualifying match: Kenny King defeated El Generico to advance
- Final match: Eddie Edwards defeated Adam Cole, Claudio Castagnoli, Kenny King, Kevin Steen and Rhett Titus in a Six-Way Elimination match to win Survival of the Fittest

Eliminated	Wrestler	Eliminated by	Method	Time
1	Kevin Steen	Claudio Castagnoli	Pinned after a bicycle kick	0:08
2	Adam Cole	Claudio Castagnoli	Pinned after a lariat	9:19
3	Rhett Titus	Claudio Castagnoli	Pinned after a pop-up European uppercut	12:18
4	Claudio Castagnoli	Kenny King	Pinned after the Royal Flush	14:23
5	Kenny King	Eddie Edwards	Submitted to an Achilles lock	16:12
Winner	Eddie Edwards	—N/a		16:12

=== 2011 ===
ROH's seventh Survival of the Fittest tournament took place on November 18, 2011 at the Montgomery County Fairgrounds in Dayton, Ohio.

- Qualifying match: The Briscoe Brothers (Jay and Mark) defeated The Bravado Brothers (Lancelot and Harlem) to advance
- Qualifying match: Kyle O'Reilly defeated Andy Ridge to advance
- Qualifying match: Eddie Edwards defeated Mike Bennett to advance
- Qualifying match: Michael Elgin defeated Adam Cole, Kenny King and Tommaso Ciampa in a Four Corner Survival match to advance
- Qualifying match: Roderick Strong defeated Rhett Titus to advance
- Final match: Michael Elgin defeated Eddie Edwards, Jay Briscoe, Kyle O'Reilly, Mark Briscoe and Roderick Strong in a Six-Way Elimination match to win Survival of the Fittest

Eliminated	Wrestler	Eliminated by	Method	Time
1	Jay Briscoe	Eddie Edwards	Pinned after Die Hard	18:21
2	Mark Briscoe	Eddie Edwards	Submitted to a dragon sleeper	18:37
3	Roderick Strong	Eddie Edwards	Pinned with a schoolboy	20:41
4	Eddie Edwards	Michael Elgin	Pinned after a spinning back fist / lariat combo	20:58
5	Kyle O'Reilly	Michael Elgin	Pinned after the Elgin Bomb	33:19
Winner	Michael Elgin	—N/a		33:19

=== 2012 ===
ROH's eighth Survival of the Fittest tournament took place on September 22, 2012 at the Du Burns Arena in Baltimore, Maryland. The tournament was recorded in a single day for Ring of Honor's television show, and aired on a taped delay over the span of several weeks.

- Qualifying match: Adam Cole defeated TaDarius Thomas to advance
- Qualifying match: Davey Richards defeated Mike Bennett to advance
- Qualifying match: Jay Lethal defeated Q. T. Marshall to advance
- Qualifying match: Roderick Strong defeated Homicide to advance
- Qualifying match: Mike Mondo defeated Kyle O'Reilly to advance
- Qualifying match: Michael Elgin defeated Rhino to advance
- Final match: Jay Lethal defeated Adam Cole, Davey Richards, Michael Elgin, Mike Mondo and Roderick Strong in a Six-Way Elimination match to win Survival of the Fittest

Eliminated	Wrestler	Eliminated by	Method	Time
1	Mike Mondo	Roderick Strong	Pinned after the Sick Kick	4:49
2	Roderick Strong	Adam Cole	Pinned after a superkick	6:41
3	Adam Cole	Michael Elgin	Pinned after the Elgin Bomb	7:32
4	Michael Elgin	Jay Lethal and Davey Richards	Double pinned after both men hit him with a Buzzsaw Kick	13:32
5	Davey Richards	Jay Lethal	Pinned after the Lethal Injection	21:26
Winner	Jay Lethal	—N/a		21:26

=== 2014 ===
ROH's ninth Survival of the Fittest tournament took place on November 8, 2014 at the Seagate Convention Center in Toledo, Ohio. The tournament took place over a span of 2 days.

- Qualifying match: Tommaso Ciampa defeated Will Ferrara to advance
- Qualifying match: Roderick Strong defeated TaDarius Thomas to advance
- Qualifying match: Adam Page defeated Cedric Alexander to advance
- Qualifying match: Adam Cole defeated Delirious to advance
- Qualifying match: Hanson defeated Jay Lethal to advance
- Qualifying match: Matt Sydal defeated A. C. H. to advance
- Final match: Adam Cole defeated Adam Page, Hanson, Matt Sydal, Roderick Strong, and Tommaso Ciampa in a Six-Way Elimination match to win Survival of the Fittest

Eliminated	Wrestler	Eliminated by	Method	Time
1	Roderick Strong	Adam Page	Pinned with a roll-up	17:08
2	Adam Page	Matt Sydal	Pinned after the Shooting Sydal Press	21:10
3	Matt Sydal	Tommaso Ciampa	Pinned after Project Ciampa	31:13
4	Tommaso Ciampa	Adam Cole	Pinned after Michael Elgin hit Ciampa with a steel chair	32:03
5	Hanson	Adam Cole	Pinned after the Florida Keys	40:50
Winner	Adam Cole	—N/a		40:50

=== 2021 ===
ROH announced the tournament would return in 2021, taking place throughout the month of June on ROH's flagship TV program Ring of Honor Wrestling, and their online show ROH Week by Week.

Twelve participants competed in six qualifying matches, with the winners advancing to a six-way elimination final. The winner received an ROH World Championship match at Best in the World.

- Qualifying match: June 5 Ring of Honor Wrestling – Demonic Flamita defeated Rey Horus to advance
- Qualifying match: June 8 ROH Week by Week – Brian Johnson defeated Sledge to advance
- Qualifying match: June 12 Ring of Honor Wrestling – Eli Isom defeated Dak Draper to advance
- Qualifying match: June 15 ROH Week by Week – Chris Dickinson defeated O'Shay Edwards to advance
- Qualifying match: June 19 Ring of Honor Wrestling – Bandido defeated Bateman to advance
- Qualifying match: June 22 ROH Week by Week – Rhett Titus defeated Danhausen to advance
- Final match: June 26 Ring of Honor Wrestling – Bandido defeated Brian Johnson, Chris Dickinson, Demonic Flamita, Eli Isom, and Rhett Titus in a Six-Way Elimination match to win Survival of the Fittest

Eliminated	Wrestler	Eliminated by	Method	Time
1	Demonic Flamita	Bandido	Pinned with a roll-up	4:50
2	Brian Johnson	Rhett Titus	Pinned after the King Kong Knee Drop	12:56
3	Rhett Titus	Chris Dickinson	Submitted to a kneebar	13:27
4	Chris Dickinson	Bandido	Pinned after the 21-Plex	18:56
5	Eli Isom	Bandido	Submitted to an omoplata	23:51
Winner	Bandido	—N/a		23:51

Note - In late 2021, ROH was sold to Tony Khan, the owner and general manager of All Elite Wrestling (AEW), and with that ROH was then effectively absorbed into AEW.

=== 2023 ===
On the November 8, 2023 episode of AEW Dynamite, Samoa Joe, who had held the ROH World Television Championship for a record 574 days, voluntarily vacated the title to concentrate on pursuing the AEW World Championship.

Tony Khan announced a week later on ROH Honor Club TV that Survival of the Fittest would return and be used in crowning a new champion. Qualifying matches took place on ROH Wrestling, leading up to the six-way finals on December 15 at Final Battle, with the winner becoming the new ROH World Television Champion. This was the first Survival of the Fittest where a championship was on the line rather than an opportunity at one, and the first where it was contested for the ROH World Television Champions rather than the ROH World Championship.

- Qualifying match: November 22 ROH Honor Club TV (aired November 30) – Komander defeated Gringo Loco to advance
- Qualifying match:November 22 ROH Honor Club TV (aired November 30) – Dalton Castle defeated Evil Uno to advance
- Qualifying match: December 2 ROH Honor Club TV (aired December 7) – Kyle Fletcher defeated Gravity to advance
- Qualifying match: December 2 ROH Honor Club TV (aired December 7) – Lee Johnson defeated Josh Woods to advance
- Qualifying match: December 2 ROH Honor Club TV (aired December 7) – Lee Moriarty defeated Tracy Williams to advance
- Qualifying match: December 15 Final Battle Zero Hour – Bryan Keith defeated Jack Cartwheel to advance
- Final match: December 15 Final Battle – Kyle Fletcher defeated Bryan Keith, Dalton Castle, Komander, Lee Johnson, and Lee Moriarty in a Six-Way Elimination match to win Survival of the Fittest and the vacant ROH World Television Championship

Eliminated	Wrestler	Eliminated by	Method	Time
1	Lee Johnson	Lee Moriarty	Submitted to the Border City Stretch	8:46
2	Dalton Castle	Lee Moriarty	Pinned after The Fang	11:20
3	Lee Moriarty	Bryan Keith	Pinned after the Emerald Tiger Driver	15:38
4	Bryan Keith	Kyle Fletcher	Pinned after the Grimstone	16:52
5	Komander	Kyle Fletcher	Pinned after the Grimstone	25:54
Winner	Kyle Fletcher	—N/a		25:54

=== 2024 July ===
On July 25, Tony Khan announced a Survival of the Fittest match for the following day's Death Before Dishonor event, where ROH World Television Champion Atlantis Jr. would defend his title against Brian Cage, Johnny TV, Lee Johnson, Lio Rush, and Shane Taylor. This would be the first Survival of the Fittest where none of the participants had qualifying matches and the first in which a championship was defended.

- Atlantis Jr. (c) defeated Brian Cage, Johnny TV, Lee Johnson, Lio Rush, and Shane Taylor in a Six-Way Elimination match to win Survival of the Fittest and retain the ROH World Television Championship

Eliminated	Wrestler	Eliminated by	Method of elimination	Time
1	Shane Taylor	Lio Rush	Pinned after The Final Hour	9:56
2	Lio Rush	Lee Johnson	Pinned after the Big Shot Drop	11:32
3	Lee Johnson	Brian Cage and Johnny TV	Double pinned after a powerslam / springboard kick combo	15:05
4	Johnny TV	Brian Cage	Pinned after the Drill Claw	18:39
5	Brian Cage	Atlantis Jr.	Pinned with a victory roll	19:12
Winner	Atlantis Jr. (c)	—N/a		19:12

=== 2024 December ===
On December 13, ROH announced another Survival of the Fittest match for the ROH World Television Championship, this time for Final Battle. Here, champion Brian Cage would defend the title against Willie Mack, Mark Davis, Komander, AR Fox, and Blake Christian.

- Komander defeated Brian Cage (c), Willie Mack, Mark Davis, AR Fox, and Blake Christian in a Six-Way Elimination match to win the ROH World Television Championship.

Eliminated	Wrestler	Eliminated by	Method of elimination	Time
1	Willie Mack	Brian Cage	Pinned after the Tornado Claw	9:29
2	AR Fox	Brian Cage	Pinned after an avalanche powerbomb	13:26
3	Brian Cage (c)	Mark Davis	Pinned after a piledriver	16:26
4	Mark Davis	Blake Christian	Pinned after a low blow	17:01
5	Blake Christian	Komander	Pinned after Cielito Lindo	25:18
Winner	Komander	—N/a		25:18

=== 2025 ===
On November 27, Tony Khan announced that, for the first time, the ROH World Championship would be contested for in a Survival of the Fittest match at Final Battle. The champion, Bandido, would defend the title against Blake Christian, Hechicero, Komander, Sammy Guevara, and The Beast Mortos.

- Bandido (c) defeated Blake Christian, Hechicero, Komander, Sammy Guevara, and The Beast Mortos in a Six-Way Elimination match to retain the ROH World Championship.

Eliminated	Wrestler	Eliminated by	Method	Time
1	Sammy Guevara	Komander	Pinned after Cielito Lindo	11:24
2	The Beast Mortos	Hechicero	Pinned after a headscissors driver	13:00
3	Komander	Blake Christian	Pinned after the Lethal Injection	15:24
4	Blake Christian	Bandido	Pinned with a sunset flip	20:38
5	Hechicero	Bandido	Pinned after a poison rana	27:53
Winner	Bandido (c)	—N/a		27:53

=== 2026 May ===
At the April 6 taping of ROH Honor Club TV, Tony Khan announced the first-ever women’s Survival of the Fittest tournament for Supercard of Honor. Five qualifying matches took place at the taping, which would air at a later date, and the winners would go onto the final to challenge Athena for the ROH Women's World Championship.

- Qualifying match: April 6 ROH Honor Club TV (aired April 17) – Maya World defeated Robyn Renegade to advance
- Qualifying match: April 6 ROH Honor Club TV (aired April 17) – Trish Adora defeated Hyan to advance
- Qualifying match: April 6 ROH Honor Club TV (aired April 17) – Yuka Sakazaki defeated Viva Van to advance
- Qualifying match: April 6 ROH Honor Club TV (aired April 17) – Billie Starkz defeated Lacey Lane to advance
- Qualifying match: April 6 ROH Honor Club TV (aired April 17) – Persephone defeated Isla Dawn to advance
  - On May 2, Tony Khan announced that Persephone would not be competing in the final after being sprayed with black mist by Julia Hart on the April 25 "Playoff Palooza" edition of AEW Collision. The following qualifying match decided her replacement.
- Qualifying match: May 9 ROH Honor Club TV: Supercard Showdown (aired May 14) – Zayda Steel defeated Hyan to advance
- Final match: May 15 Supercard of Honor – Athena (c) defeated Maya World, Trish Adora, Yuka Sakazaki, Billie Starkz, and Zayda Steel in a Six-Way Elimination match to retain the ROH Women's World Championship.

Eliminated	Wrestler	Eliminated by	Method	Time
1	Zayda Steel	Athena	Pinned after being thrown into a steel chair in the corner	5:01
2	Trish Adora	Yuka Sakazaki	Pinned after a spinning side slam	15:39
3	Yuka Sakazaki	Billie Starkz	Pinned after a double underhook facebuster from the top rope	17:27
4	Billie Starkz	Maya World	Pinned after a sunset flip powerbomb	21:47
5	Maya World	Athena	Pinned after an O-Face off of a ladder	26:12
Winner	Athena (c)	—N/a		26:12

=== 2026 July ===
On the May 20 episode of AEW Dynamite, Willow Nightingale announced that, due to a shoulder injury, she would relinquish the AEW TBS Championship. The situation surrounding the title was addressed ten days later on an episode of AEW Collision, where AEW commentator Tony Schiavone announced that AEW would host its first Survival of the Fittest tournament, the second ever to feature women, to determine the new champion. The final would take place on the July 1 episode of Dynamite in San Diego, California. On the June 6 episode of Collision, six of the twelve competitors in the tournament were revealed: Hikaru Shida, Kris Statlander, Mina Shirakawa, Harley Cameron, Queen Aminata, and Zayda Steel. Qualifying matches were later held during Dynamite and Collision episodes.

- Qualifying match: June 11 Collision: Summer Blockbuster (aired June 13) – Persephone defeated Julia Hart to advance
- Qualifying match: June 11 Collision: Summer Blockbuster (aired June 13) – Hikaru Shida defeated Zayda Steel to advance
- Qualifying match: June 17 Collision (aired June 20) – Kris Statlander defeated Mina Shirakawa to advance
- Qualifying match: June 24 Dynamite – Queen Aminata defeated Red Velvet to advance
- Qualifying match: June 24 Dynamite – Harley Cameron defeated Marina Shafir to advance
- Qualifying match: June 28 Forbidden Door Buy-In – Maika defeated Skye Blue to advance
- Final match: July 1 Dynamite – Hikaru Shida defeated Persephone, Kris Statlander, Queen Aminata, Harley Cameron, and Maika in a Six-Way Elimination match to win the vacant AEW TBS Championship

Eliminated	Wrestler	Eliminated by	Method	Time
1	Harley Cameron	Persephone	Pinned after a crucifix powerbomb	2:23
2	Maika	Hikaru Shida	Pinned with a schoolgirl	7:34
3	Queen Aminata	Persephone	Pinned with a schoolgirl	9:48
4	Persephone	Kris Statlander	Pinned with a cradle	15:29
5	Kris Statlander	Hikaru Shida	Passed out in a bow and arrow hold after being hit with the title belt by Persephone.	17:29
Winner	Hikaru Shida	—N/a		17:29

== Pay-per-view and event dates and venues ==
The Survival of the Fittest is a professional wrestling event, held annually by the Ring of Honor promotion. The event was initially held in 2004 and its last event was held in 2021. There was no event in 2020 of the scheduled pay-per-view due to the COVID-19 pandemic. It is currently unknown if or when the event will be reinstated in the future.

Survival of the Fittest
- Promotions: Ring of Honor
- First event: 2004
- Last event: 2021

=== Dates and venues ===
Event	Date	Venue	City	Main event	Ref
Survival of the Fittest (2004)	June 24, 2004	Ramada Inn	Essington, Pennsylvania	Austin Aries vs. Bryan Danielson vs. Colt Cabana vs. Homicide vs. Mark Briscoe vs. Samoa Joe	
Survival of the Fittest (2005)	September 24, 2005	Dorchester National Guard Armory	Dorchester, Massachusetts	Austin Aries vs. Christopher Daniels vs. Colt Cabana vs. Jay Lethal vs. Roderick Strong vs. Samoa Joe	
Survival of the Fittest (2006)	October 6, 2006	Grays Armory	Cleveland, Ohio	Austin Aries vs. Delirious vs. Jay Briscoe vs. Mark Briscoe vs. Matt Sydal	
Survival of the Fittest (2007)	October 19, 2007	Empire Ballroom	Las Vegas, Nevada	Austin Aries vs. Chris Hero vs. Delirious vs. Human Tornado vs. Rocky Romero vs. Roderick Strong	
Survival of the Fittest (2009)	October 10, 2009	Indiana State Fairgrounds	Indianapolis, Indiana	Chris Hero vs. Claudio Castagnoli vs. Colt Cabana vs. Delirious vs. Roderick Strong vs. Tyler Black	
Survival of the Fittest (2010)	November 12, 2010	Ford Community & Performing Arts Center	Dearborn, Michigan	Adam Cole vs. Claudio Castagnoli vs. Eddie Edwards vs. Kenny King vs. Kevin Steen vs. Rhett Titus	
Survival of the Fittest (2011)	November 18, 2011	Montgomery County Fairground Coliseum	Dayton, Ohio	Michael Elgin vs. Eddie Edwards vs. Jay Briscoe vs. Kyle O'Reilly vs. Mark Briscoe vs. Roderick Strong	
Survival of the Fittest (2014)	November 7, 2014 to November 8, 2014	Ohio Expo Center (7th) / Seagate Center (8th)	Columbus, Ohio (7th) / Toledo, Ohio (8th)	Adam Cole vs. Adam Page vs. Roderick Strong vs. Tommaso Ciampa vs. Matt Sydal vs. Hanson	
Survival of the Fittest (2015)	November 13, 2015 to November 14, 2015	Turner Hall Ballroom (13th) / Eisenhower Community Center (14th)	Milwaukee, Wisconsin (13th) / Hopkins, Minnesota (14th)	Michael Elgin vs. ACH vs. Christopher Daniels vs. Jay Briscoe vs. Silas Young	
Survival of the Fittest (2016)	November 3, 2016 to November 4, 2016	Arlington Convention Center (3rd) / San Antonio Shrine Auditorium (4th)	Arlington, Texas (3rd) / San Antonio, Texas (4th)	Bobby Fish vs. Dalton Castle vs. Lio Rush vs. Punishment Martinez vs. Jax Dane vs. The Panther	
Survival of the Fittest (2017)	November 17, 2017 to November 19, 2017	Austin Highway Event Center (17th) / Gilley's Dallas (18th) / Cox Convention Center (19th)	San Antonio, Texas (17th) / Dallas, Texas (18th) / Oklahoma City, Oklahoma (19th)	Punishment Martinez vs. Flip Gordon vs. Jonathan Gresham vs. Matt Taven vs. Shane Taylor vs. Silas Young	
Survival of the Fittest (2018)	November 4, 2018	The Express Live	Columbus, Ohio	Marty Scurll vs. Christopher Daniels vs. Hangman Page vs. Jonathan Gresham vs. PJ Black vs. Guerrero Maya Jr.	
Survival of the Fittest (2021)	June 5, 2021 to June 26, 2021	Chesapeake Employers Insurance Arena	Baltimore, Maryland	Bandido vs. Flamita vs. Rhett Titus vs. Eli Isom vs. Chris Dickinson vs. Brian Johnson	
(c) – refers to the champion(s) heading into the match

== See also ==
- ROH Honor Rumble
- ROH Tag Wars Tournament
- ROH Top Prospect Tournament
- List of Ring of Honor tournaments
- List of Ring of Honor pay-per-view and livestreaming events
