= ECWA Tag Team Championship =

Professional wrestling tag team championship

Details
- Promotion: East Coast Wrestling Association
- Date established: May 1, 1993
- Current champions: The Marvelous Ones (Greg Spitz and Teddy Fine)
- Date won: September 19, 2020

Other names
- ECWA Tag Team Championship (1993 - 2011); ECWA Unified Tag Team Championship (2011 - present)
Statistics
- First champions: The Russian Invaders (Russian Invader I and Russian Invader II)
- Most reigns: (as a team) Logan Brothers (Matt Logan and Bryan Logan) (4 reigns) (as an individual) Matt Logan and Bryan Logan (4 reigns)
- Longest reign: The Valedictorians (Billy Bax and Rob Eckos)(917 days)
- Shortest reign: Flatliners (Asylum and Matt Burns) and Logan Brothers (Matt Logan and Bryan Logan) (<1 day)

The ECWA Tag Team Championship is a professional wrestling tag team championship created and promoted by the American independent wrestling promotion, East Coast Wrestling Association (ECWA). There have been a total of 59 reigns and 4 vacancies shared between 44 different teams consisting of 83 distinctive champions. The current champions are The Marvelous Ones (Greg Spitz and Teddy Fine), who are in their first reign.

== Title history ==
Key
No.	Overall reign number
Reign	Reign number for the specific team—reign numbers for the individuals are in parentheses, if different
Days	Number of days held
<1	Reign lasted less than a day
+	Current reign is changing daily

No.	Champion	Championship change			Reign statistics		Notes	Ref.
No.	Champion	Date	Event	Location	Reign	Days	Notes	Ref.
1	The Russian Invaders (Russian Invader I and Russian Invader II)	May 1, 1993	House show	Wilmington, DE	1	N/A	The Russian invaders were billed as the inaugural champions under unknown circumstances. The exact length of this reign is uncertain.	
—	Vacated	May–August 1993	—	—	—	—		
2	The Hollywood Hunks ( Delectable Danny Desire And Dazzling Donny Love)	August 13, 1993	House show	Wilmington, DE	1	764-778	Defeated Irish Mickey O’Brien and Rocking Ronnie Roberts to win the vacant titles. The exact length of this reign is uncertain.Danny Desire left ECWA during the title reign unknown who replaced him.	
3	Ace Darling and Kid Flash	September 1995	House show	Wilmington, DE	1	26-44	The first known defence of the team took place on September 16.	
4	Steve Corino and Lance Diamond	November 17, 1995	ECWA	Wilmington, DE	1	85		
5	Boogie Woogie Brown and Inferno Brown	February 10, 1996	ECWA	Wilmington, DE	1	69		
6	Steve Corino and Lance Diamond	April 19, 1996	ECWA	Wilmington, DE	2	21	This was a Texas tornado tag team match.	
7	Boogie Woogie Brown and Inferno Brown	May 10, 1996	ECWA	Wilmington, DE	2	143-174	This was a Texas tornado tag team match. The exact length of this reign is uncertain.	
8	Viper and Armageddon	October 1996	House show	Wilmington, DE	1	178-208	The exact length of this reign is uncertain.	
9	Lance Diamond (2) and Cheetah Master	April 26, 1997	ECWA	Newport, DE	1	581		
10	Ace Darling (2) and Devon Storm	November 28, 1998	ECWA	Wilmington, DE	1	140		
11	Mark Schraeder and Christian York	April 17, 1999	ECWA	Newport, DE	1	104		
12	Mark Schraeder (2) and Thunder	July 30, 1999	ECWA	Newport, DE	1	112		
13	The Backseat Boyz (Johnny Kashmere and Trent Acid)	November 19, 1999	House show	Wilmington, DE	1	N/A	The exact length of this reign is uncertain.	
14	The Haas Brothers (Charlie Haas and Russ Haas)	2000	House show	N/A	1	N/A	The exact length of this reign is uncertain.	
15	Low Ki and American Dragon	April 7, 2001	House show	Wilmington, DE	1	364	Low Ki and Dragon began feuding and later arranged a tag team match in which the winning team member would choose the partner with whom he shared the titles.	
16	Low Ki (2) and Xavier	April 6, 2002	House show	Wilmington, DE	1	28	Although American Dragon pinned Christopher Daniels in the tag team match, Low Ki was the legal man in the ring. As per a prematch stipulation, he subsequently chose Xavier to be his new tag team partner.	
17	The S.A.T. (Joél Maximo and José Maximo)	May 4, 2002	ECWA	Newport, DE	1	295	This was a four-way tag team match also involving J.J. Johnston and J.R. Ryder and Buck Wylde and Matt Striker.	
18	Ace Darling (3) and Matt Striker	February 23, 2003	ECWA	Wilmington, DE	1	195	This was a four-way tag team match also involving Da Hit Squad (Mafia and Monsta Mack) and Prince Nana and Mega.	
19	The Maxx Brothers (Johnny Maxx and Joey Maxx)	September 6, 2003	ECWA	Wilmington, DE	1	63		
20	The Valedictorians (Billy Bax and Rob Eckos)	November 8, 2003	ECWA	Wilmington, DE	1	917		
21	Aden Chambers and Andrew Ryker	May 13, 2006	Night Of Unusual Matches	Newark, DE	1	203	This was a tornado street fight tag team match.	
22	The Valedictorians (Billy Bax and Rob Eckos)	December 2, 2006	ECWA	Newark, DE	2	56	This was a four-way tag team match also involving Jason Blade and Kid Mikaze and Shane Hagadorn and Pelle Primeau.	
23	The Heavyweights (Sean Royal and Dan Eckos)	January 27, 2007	ECWA	Newark, DE	1	259		
24	The Berlin Bad Boys (Kermon the German and Max Von Bauer)	October 13, 2007	ECWA	Newark, DE	1	49	This was a Steel cage match.	
25	Logan Brothers (Bryan Logan and Matt Logan)	December 1, 2007	Hall Of Fame	Newark, DE	1	301	This was a four-way tag team match also involving The Heavyweights (Dan Eckos and Sean Royal) and The Valedictorians (Billy Bax and Rob Eckos).	
26	Leather 'n' Lace (JJ the Crew Guy and Mike Reed)	September 27, 2008	ECWA	Newark, DE	1	161		
27	Cha Cha Chance and Mega	March 7, 2009	ECWA	Newark, DE	1	189		
28	The Arion Brothers (Alex Arion and Frankie Arion)	September 12, 2009	ECWA	Newark, DE	1	28		
29	Logan Brothers (Matt Logan and Bryan Logan)	October 10, 2009	13th Annual Super 8 Tournament	Newark, DE	2	161		
30	Team WCWA (Ryan Rush and Julian Starr)	March 20, 2010	ECWA	Newark, DE	1	112	This was a winner-takes-all six-man tag team match where Rush and Starr teamed up with Aden Chambers and The Logan Brothers teamed up with the ECWA Mid-Atlantic Heavyweight Champion Nick Logan, whose title was also on the line. Chambers won the Heavyweight title but was not recognized as tag team champion.	
31	Logan Brothers (Matt Logan and Bryan Logan)	July 10, 2010	ECWA 14th Annual Super 8 Tournament	Newark, DE	3	88	This was a six-man tag team match where The Logan Brothers teamed up with Nick Logan against Ryan Rush, Aden Chambers and Tony Burma who replaced Julian Starr.	
32	The Best Around (TJ Cannon and Bruce Maxwell)	October 16, 2010	There's A Hurricane Comin' Through the ECWA	Newark, DE	1	167	This was a three-way tag team match also involving The Heavyweights (Dan Eckos and Sean Royal) and Matt Logan and Chase Del Monte who replaced an injured Bryan Logan.	
—	Vacated	April 1, 2011	—	—	—	—	The titles were vacated after TJ Cannon was sided with a legitimate injury.	
33	Fusion DS (Matt Saigon and Damian Dragon)	May 7, 2011	ECWA	Newark, DE	1	196	This was a unification tag team match also for the TWA Tag Team Championship where Saigon and Dragon defeated The Midnight Sensations (Chris Rockwell and Sam Shields) to win the vacant titles.	
34	Flatliners (Asylum and Matt Burns)	November 19, 2011	K-Cup Tag Team Tournament	Newark, DE	1	<1	This was a quarter-final match from the 1st Annual K-CUP Tag Team Tournament.	
35	Logan Brothers (Matt Logan and Bryan Logan)	November 19, 2011	K-Cup Tag Team Tournament	Newark, DE	4	<1	This was a semi-final match from the 1st Annual K-CUP Tag Team Tournament.	
36	Midnight Sensations (Chris Rockwell and Sam Shields)	November 19, 2011	K-Cup Tag Team Tournament	Newark, DE	1	105	This was the final match of the 1st Annual K-CUP Tag Team Tournament.	
37	Fusion DS (Matt Saigon and Damian Dragon)	March 3, 2012	ECWA	Newark, DE	2	7		
38	Midnight Sensations (Chris Rockwell and Sam Shields)	March 10, 2012	ECWA	Carney's Point, New Jersey	2	56	This was a Texas tornado tag team match.	
39	Fusion DS (Matt Saigon and Damian Dragon)	May 5, 2012	Divide & Conquer	Newark, DE	3	133	This was a Loser Leaves Town match.	
40	Midnight Sensations/The Sons Of Blackheart (Chris Rockwell/Armageddon and Sam Shields/Anarchy)	September 15, 2012	45th Anniversary Show	Newark, DE	3	35	Rockwell and Shields competed under the names of Armageddon and Anarchy as The Sons Of Blackheart when they won the titles, but subsequently shortened their names back.	
41	Dream Team (Kekoa the Flyin' Hawaiian and Aden Chambers)	October 20, 2012	Witching Hour	Sewell, NJ	1	175	This was a three-way tag team match also involving Fusion DS (Damian Dragon and Matt Saigon).	
42	The Black Heart (Monster Ahtu and Breaker Morant)	April 13, 2013	17th Annual Super 8 Tournament	Newark, DE	1	55	This was an eight-man tag team match where Ahtu and Morant teamed up with the ECWA Mid-Atlantic Heavyweight Champion Ricky Martinez and the ECWA Heavyweight Champion Josh Daniels. The match was for all the titles, with Daniels and Martinez retaining them. Chambers and Kekoa also teamed up with Bobby Shields and Danny E.	
—	Vacated	June 7, 2013	—	—	—	—	Ahtu and Morant were stripped of the titles by Joe Zanolle due to a controversial ending of a title defense against D-Line (Black Ice and Body Snatcher) from June 1.	
43	D-LINE (Bodysnatcher and Black Ice)	July 13, 2013	Aden Chambers Farewell Show	Newark, DE	1	266	This was an anything goes tag team match with Damian Dragon as a special guest referee where Bodysnatcher and Black Ice defeated The Black Heart (Monster Ahtu and Breaker Morant) in a rematch to win the vacant titles.	
44	Team CK (Kage and Sean Carr)	April 5, 2014	18th Annual Super 8 Tournament	Newark, DE	1	154		
—	Vacated	September 6, 2014	—	—	—	—	Kage and Carr were stripped off the titles after they failed to show up to a title defense.	
45	The Extreme Rednecks (Chuck Payne and Kyle Payne)	March 1, 2015	Winter Challenge	Newark, DE	1	118	This was a Three Way Elimination match also involving Black Wall Street (Napalm Bomb and Solo) and Breaker Morant and Cory Kastle for the vacant titles.	
46	D-LINE (Bodysnatcher and Black Ice)	June 27, 2015	Summer Sizzler	Springfield, PA	2	21		
47	The Extreme Rednecks (Chuck Payne and Kyle Payne)	July 18, 2015	Summer Splash	Woodbury Heights, NJ	2	91		
48	Team PCA (Damian Adams and Ricky Martinez)	October 17, 2015	2nd Annual Super 8 ChickFight Tournament	Woodbury Heights, NJ	1	231		
49	The Sons Of Brooklyn (Mike Verna and Talon)	June 4, 2016	Raising The Bar V	Woodbury Heights, NJ	1	49	The special guest referee of this match was Bobby Shields.	
50	Pan's Corp Agency (AJ Pan and Damian Adams (2), Azrieal, Ricky Martinez (2) and Romeo Roselli)	July 23, 2016	Summer Splash	Woodbury Heights, NJ	1	280	Pan and Adams won the match, but Azrieal, Martinez ans Roselli were also recognized champions under the freebird Rule.	
51	The Extreme Rednecks (Chuck Payne and Kyle Payne)	April 29, 2017	21st Annual Super 8 Tournament	Woodbury Heights, NJ	3	56		
52	The Classics (Eric Martin and Tyler Stone)	June 24, 2017	Fire And Ice	Springfield, PA	1	84		
53	Mr. Ooh La La and Jay D. Luscious	September 16, 2017	50th Anniversary Show	Woodbury Heights, NJ	1	5	Cagematch.net shows that Martin and Stone retained at the 50th Anniversary Show, but still listed Mr. Ooh La La and Jay D. Luscious as official champions.	
54	One Mean Team (Brian Johnson and Justin Pusser)	September 21, 2017	House show	Laurel Springs, NJ	1	212		
55	Frankie Pickard and Tahir James	April 21, 2018	House show	Philadelphia, PA	1	56		
56	One Mean Team (Brian Johnson and Justin Pusser)	June 16, 2018	House show	Atlantic City, NJ	2	119		
57	The Funky White Boy and Marcus Waters	October 13, 2018	Witching Hour	New Castle, DE	1	420		
58	Mr. Ooh La La and Jay D. Luscious	December 7, 2019	Toys For Tots	New Castle, DE	2	287		
59	The Marvelous Ones (Greg Spitz and Teddy Fine)	September 19, 2020	24th Annual Super 8 Tournament	Morganville, NJ	1	2,113+		

== Combined reigns ==
As of 24 September 2023

†	Indicates the current champion
¤	The exact length of at least one title reign is uncertain, so the shortest length is considered.

=== By team ===
Rank	Team	No. of reigns	Combined days
2	The Valedictorians (Billy Bax and Rob Eckos)	2	973
3	The Hollywood Hunks (Custom Made Man and Stunning Sean)	1	¤764-778
4	Lance Diamond and Cheetah Master	1	581
5	Logan Brothers (Matt Logan and Bryan Logan)	4	550
1	The Marvelous Ones (Greg Spitz and Teddy Fine) †	1	2,113+
6	The Funky White Boy and Marcus Waters	1	420
7	Low Ki and American Dragon	1	364
8	Fusion DS (Matt Saigon and Damian Dragon)	3	336
9	One Mean Team (Brian Johnson and Justin Pusser)	2	331
10	The S.A.T. (Joél Maximo and José Maximo)	1	295
11	Mr. Ooh La La and Jay D. Luscious	2	292
12	D-LINE (Bodysnatcher and Black Ice)	2	287
13	Pan's Corp Agency (AJ Pan and Damian Adams, Azrieal, Ricky Martinez and Romeo Roselli)	1	280
14	The Extreme Rednecks (Chuck Payne and Kyle Payne)	3	265
15	The Heavyweights (Sean Royal and Dan Eckos)	1	259
16	Team PCA (Damian Adams and Ricky Martinez)	1	231
17	Boogie Woogie Brown and Inferno Brown	2	¤212-243
18	Aden Chambers and Andrew Ryker	1	203
19	Midnight Sensations/The Sons Of Blackheart (Chris Rockwell/Armageddon and Sam Shields/Anarchy)	3	196
20	Ace Darling and Matt Striker	1	195
21	Mega and Cha Cha Chance	1	189
22	Viper and Armageddon	1	¤178-208
23	Dream Team (Kekoa the Flyin' Hawaiian and Aden Chambers)	1	175
24	The Best Around (TJ Cannon and Bruce Maxwell)	1	167
25	Leather 'n' Lace (JJ the Crew Guy and Mike Reed)	1	161
26	Team CK (Kage and Sean Carr)	1	154
27	Ace Darling and Devon Storm	1	140
28	Mark Schraeder and Thunder	1	112
28	Team WCWA (Ryan Rush and Julian Starr)	1	112
30	Steve Corino and Lance Diamond	2	106
31	Mark Schraeder and Christian York	1	104
32	The Classics (Eric Martin and Tyler Stone)	1	84
33	The Maxx Brothers (Johnny Maxx and Joey Maxx)	1	63
34	Frankie Pickard and Tahir James	1	56
35	The Black Heart (Monster Ahtu and Breaker Morant)	1	55
36	The Berlin Bad Boys (Kermon the German and Max Von Bauer)	1	49
36	The Sons Of Brooklyn (Mike Verna and Talon)	1	49
38	Low Ki and Xavier	1	28
38	The Arion Brothers (Alex Arion and Frankie Arion)	1	28
40	Ace Darling and Kid Flash	1	¤26-44
41	Flatliners (Asylum and Matt Burns)	1	<1
42	The Backseat Boyz (Johnny Kashmere and Trent Acid)	1	¤N/A
42	The Haas Brothers (Charlie Haas and Russ Haas)	1	¤N/A
42	The Russian Invaders (Russian Invader I and Russian Invader II)	1	¤N/A

=== By wrestler ===
Rank	Wrestler	No. of reigns	Combined days
1	Billy Bax	2	973
1	Rob Eckos	2	973
3	Custom Made Man	1	¤764-778
3	Stunning Sean	1	¤764-778
5	Lance Diamond	2	687
6	Cheetah Master	1	581
7	Bryan Logan	4	550
7	Matt Logan	4	550
9	Damian Adams	2	511
9	Ricky Martinez	2	511
11	Greg Spitz †	1	2,113+
11	Teddy Fine †	1	2,113+
13	Marcus Waters	1	420
13	The Funky White Boy	1	420
15	Low Ki	2	392
16	Aden Chambers	2	378
17	American Dragon	1	364
18	Ace Darling	3	¤361-379
19	Damian Dragon	3	336
19	Matt Saigon	3	336
21	Brian Johnson	2	331
21	Justin Pusser	2	331
23	Joél Maximo	1	295
23	José Maximo	1	295
25	Jay D. Luscious	2	292
25	Mr. Ooh La La	2	292
27	Bodysnatcher	2	287
27	Black Ice	2	287
29	AJ Pan	1	280
29	Azrieal	1	280
29	Romeo Roselli	1	280
32	Chuck Payne	3	265
32	Kyle Payne	3	265
34	Dan Eckos	1	259
34	Sean Royal	1	259
36	Mark Schraeder	2	216
37	Boogie Woogie Brown	2	¤212-243
37	Inferno Brown	2	¤212-243
39	Andrew Ryker	1	203
40	Chris Rockwell/Armageddon	3	196
40	Sam Shields/Anarchy	3	196
42	Matt Striker	1	195
43	Cha Cha Chance	1	189
43	Mega	1	189
45	Armageddon	1	¤178-208
45	Viper	1	¤178-208
47	Kekoa the Flyin' Hawaiian	1	175
48	Bruce Maxwell	1	167
48	TJ Cannon	1	167
50	JJ the Crew Guy	1	161
50	Mike Reed	1	161
52	Kage	1	154
52	Sean Carr	1	154
54	Devon Storm	1	140
55	Julian Starr	1	112
55	Ryan Rush	1	112
55	Thunder	1	112
58	Steve Corino	1	106
59	Christian York	1	104
60	Eric Martin	1	84
60	Tyler Stone	1	84
62	Johnny Maxx	1	63
62	Joey Maxx	1	63
64	Frankie Prichard	1	56
64	Tahir James	1	56
66	Breaker Morant	1	55
66	Mosher Ahtu	1	55
68	Kermon the German	1	49
68	Max Von Bauer	1	49
68	Mike Verna	1	49
68	Talon	1	49
72	Alex Arion	1	28
72	Frankie Arion	1	28
72	Xavier	1	28
75	Asylum	1	<1
75	Matt Burns	1	<1
77	Kid Flash	1	¤26-44
78	Charlie Haas	1	¤N/A
78	Johnny Kashmere	1	¤N/A
78	Russ Haas	1	¤N/A
78	Russian Invader I	1	¤N/A
78	Russian Invader II	1	¤N/A
78	Trent Acid	1	¤N/A
