= List of former Major League Wrestling personnel =

This is a list of former employees of the professional wrestling promotion Major League Wrestling. Launched in 2002, Major League Wrestling would air locally in Florida and hold major shows in the style of pay-per-views which would run for two hours. After going on an extended hiatus in 2004, Major League Wrestling would run live shows featuring top independent talent worldwide beginning again in 2017 and following the success of their live shows would obtain a one-hour television show named Fusion which currently airs on BeIN Sports as well as their YouTube channel. This list is organized alphabetically by the wrestlers' real family names. In the case of wrestlers originating from Spanish-speaking countries, who most often have two surnames, the paternal (first) surname is used.

== Male wrestlers ==
Birth name:	Ring name(s):	Tenure:	Notes
Bill Alfonso	Bill Alfonso	2003	
Mike Alfonso^{†}	Mike Awesome	2002–2003	
Edward Annis	Teddy Hart	2018-2019	
Hassan Assad	MVP	2017-2018	
Prince Bandoh	Prince Nana	2002	
Matthew Bentley	Michael Shane	2003–2004	
Retesh Bhalla	Sonjay Dutt	2003–2004	
Joseph Bonsignore	Joey Styles	2003–2004	
Phillip Brooks	CM Punk	2003	
Jason Broyles	EZ Money	2002	
Terry Brunk	Sabu	2002–2004	
Chris Candido^{†}	Chris Candido	2002	
Matthew Capiccioni	M-Dogg 20	2004	
Michael Cariglio	Michael Modest	2004	
Steven Carrasquillo	Monsta Mack	2003	
Jeff Cobb	Jeff Cobb	2017-2018	
Chad Collyer	Chad Collyer	2004	
Edwin Colón	Eddie Colón	2003	
Accie Connor	D-Lo Brown	2003	
Steve Corino	Steve Corino	2002–2004	
Daniel Covell	Christopher Daniels	2002–2003	
James Cox	James Storm	2018	
Benito Cuntapay	B-Boy	2003	
Bryan Danielson	Bryan Danielson	2004	
Rick Diaz	Ricky Reyes	2004	
Brigham Doane	Masada	2002–2003	
Edward Fatu^{†}	Ekmo	2003	
Fénix	Rey Fénix	2018-2019	
Maxwell Friedman	Maxwell Jacob Friedman/MJF	2018-2020	
Jonathan Figueroa	Fuego Guerrero	2002–2003	
Chris Ford	Devon Storm	2002	
Francine Fournier	Francine	2003	
Jim Fullington	The Sandman	2002–2003	
Terry Funk	Terry Funk	2002–2004	
Eduardo González	Juventud Guerrera	2003	
Donald Hager	Jake Hager	2017-2018	
Donald Haviland^{†}	Hack Meyers	2002	
John Hennigan	John Hennigan	2017-2018	
Ikuto Hidaka	Ikuto Hidaka	2002–2003	
Ian Hodgkinson	Vampiro	2002–2004	
Francisco Islas	Super Crazy	2002	
José Jair	Shocker	2002	
Joey Janela	Joey Janela	2017-2018	
Matthew Kaye	Matt Rite / Matt Martel	2003–2004	
Pat Kenney	Simon Diamond	2002–2004	
Kevin Kesar	Killer Kross	2020	
Eric Koenreich	Erick Stevens	2020	
Satoshi Kojima	Satoshi Kojima	2002–2003	
Jerry Lawler	Jerry "The King" Lawler	2003	
Scott Levy	Raven	2003–2004	
Chris Lindsey	Roderick Strong	2004	
Paul London	Paul London	2003	
Dan Lopez	Mafia	2003	
Jerry Lynn	Jerry Lynn	2002–2004	
Daniel Lyon	Super Dragon	2003	
Troy Martin	Shane Douglas	2002	
James McAhren	Jimmy Havoc	2017-2020	
Jack Miller	Dark Fuego	2004	
Peter Minnema	Pete Wilson	2004	
Timothy Moura	Timothy Thatcher	2019	
Maunakea Mossman	Taiyo Kea	2002	
Kazushige Nosawa	NOSAWA	2002–2003	
Pentagón Jr.	Pentagón Jr.	2018-2019	
T. J. Perkins	Puma	2004	
Seth Petruzelli	Seth Petruzelli	2017-2018	
Peter Polaco	P.J. Walker	2003	
Julio Ramirez	Joel Maximo	2002–2004	
Kelvin Ramirez	Jose Maximo	2002–2004	
Matt Riddle	Matt Riddle	2017-2018	
John Rivera	Rocky Romero	2004	
Timothy Roberts^{†}	Afterburn	2002	
Sam Roman	Kid Romeo	2003	
Virgil Runnels, Jr.^{†}	Dusty Rhodes	2002	
Shigeki Sato	Dick Togo	2002	
Nuufolau Seanoa	Joe Seanoa	2003	
Mike Shane	Mike Shane	2004	
Todd Shane	Todd Shane	2004	
Larry Shreve	Abdullah the Butcher	2003	
Norman Smiley	Norman Smiley	2002–2004	
Samuel Johnston	Sami Callihan	2017-2019	
Jacob Southwick	Fulton	2017-2018	
Daniel Sowold	Austin Aries	2017	
Charles Spencer	Tony Mamaluke	2003	
Chris Spradlin	Chris Hero	2004	
Kenzo Suzuki	Kenzo Suzuki	2003	
Masato Tanaka	Masato Tanaka	2003	
Jerry Tuite^{†}	The Wall	2002	
John Watson	Mikey Whipwreck / Young Dragon #2	2003	
Steve Williams^{†}	"Dr. Death" Steve Williams	2002–2003	
Theodore Wilson	TJ Wilson	2004	
Barry Windham	Barry Windham	2003	
Brian Wohl	Julio Dinero / Julio Fantastico	2002	
Chris Wright	C. W. Anderson	2002–2004	
James Yun	Jimmy Yang	2002–2003	

Notes
^{†} Indicates they are deceased.
^{‡} Indicates they died while they were employed with Major League Wrestling.

== Commentators ==
- Rich Bocchini
- Jim Cornette
- A.J. Kirsch
- Saint Laurent
- Tony Schiavone
- Matt Striker
