= Glen Osbourne =

American professional wrestler (born 1971)

Personal information
- Born: Glen Osbourne; June 5, 1971 (age 55) Philadelphia, Pennsylvania, U.S.

Professional wrestling career
- Ring name(s): The Beast; Glen Osbourne
- Billed height: 6 ft 1 in (185 cm)
- Billed weight: 260 lb (118 kg)
- Billed from: "The Badlands"
- Trained by: Larry Winters
- Debut: June 14, 1990
- Retired: 2011

Glen Osbourne (born June 5, 1971) is an American retired professional wrestler, perhaps best known for his appearances with Eastern Championship Wrestling in the early 1990s, where he was the second ever, and the overall second youngest holder of the ECW Television Championship.

== Professional wrestling career ==
=== Tri-State Wrestling Alliance (1990–1992) ===
Osbourne got his start in the Philadelphia-based Tri-State Wrestling Alliance (TWA), run by radio personality Joel Goodhart, and became an early contributor to the city's hardcore wrestling style (Paul Heyman made his first ECW Television appearance by smashing his portable phone over Glen Osbourne's head). The TWA was unique for its time because they regularly booked big-name talent to work with their homegrown stars. Other notable TWA alumni include The Sandman, Rockin' Rebel, Jimmy Jannetty, Larry Winters, Tony Stetson, Johnny Hotbody, Max Thrasher, and D.C. Drake. During this time, Osbourne attended West Chester University, majoring in English.

=== Eastern Championship Wrestling (1992–1993) ===
Although its shows drew well, the TWA ceased operations suddenly in 1992. The gap was soon filled by Eastern Championship Wrestling, helmed by Tod Gordon. The team of Osbourne and Max Thrasher, known as Nightbreed, were entered into a tournament to crown the first holders of the Tag Team Championship. They defeated The Flames in the first round, but eventually lost to The Super Destroyers in the finals. Following the loss, Thrasher viciously turned on Osbourne and hired Hunter Q. Robbins as his manager. The two engaged in a bloody feud which lasted for several months. After getting the best of Thrasher, Osbourne set out to pursue a singles career. In September 1992, he defeated The Sandman in a match for the vacant Television Championship, becoming the youngest wrestler in history to hold the honor. He was forced to vacate the belt in early 1993, but was entered into a tournament to determine a new champion. He defeated Johnny Hotbody and "Hot Stuff" Eddie Gilbert before losing to "Superfly" Jimmy Snuka in the finals. Osbourne left ECW later that year.

=== East Coast Wrestling Association and Independent circuit (1993–2011) ===
Osbourne ventured out onto the independent circuit in 1993. After brief stints in the NWA and ACW, he joined the Delaware-based East Coast Wrestling Association in the summer of that year. During this run he wrestled stars such as Tito Santana, Cheetah Master, Ace Darling, Blue Thunder, and The Bushwhackers. In 1996, Osbourne joined the Maryland-based Mid-Eastern Wrestling Federation (MEWF) and formed a tag-team with Rockin' Rebel known as Darkside. Together they dominated their division, winning the MEWF tag-team titles 5 times between 1996 and 1997. They also won the Virginia-based International Pro Wrestling Association tag team titles twice. During this time, Osbourne and Rebel were being scouted by the World Wrestling Federation. They worked for the company occasionally in dark matches and on house shows, both in singles and as a team, between 1994 and 2001. They also appeared regularly for the NWA.

Glen Osbourne was inducted into the ECWA Hall of Fame in 1996. On February 22, 1997, he won the ECWA Heavyweight Championship in Wilmington, Delaware, defeating Cheetah Master in a classic 30-minute match. He defended the title against stars such as Mick Foley, Andrew Martin, and Christian Cage. He would later win the ECWA Mid Atlantic Championship from Ty Street in 2000.

In 1998, Osbourne won the Pennsylvania Championship Wrestling Tag Team Titles with Ace Darling. While in PCW, he feuded with stars such as Edge, Mike Barton, Simon Diamond, and Julio Dinero. In 1999, he defeated Michael Modest for the PCW Heavyweight Championship. He won the King of PCW Tournament later that year.

Osbourne would also team with Derek Domino as The Natural Born Killers in the NWA and ECWA, and with Kevin Sullivan as The Dark Shadows in the TWA.

In 2001 and 2002 Osbourne appeared with Combat Zone Wrestling, where he feuded briefly with John Zandig despite a severely injured neck and arm. Their rivalry ended at ECW Arena with a televised barbed wire/chain match.

In 2003 Osbourne pinned Christian York in a tournament final match to become the first Dynamite Championship Wrestling Heavyweight Champion and formed a stable with Riptide, The Bouncer and Johnny Thunder called The Pain Syndicate. He also reunited with Rockin' Rebel to win the POW Tag Team Championships, and toured Central America.

In August 2004 Glen won the Unlimited World Championship in the Susquehanna Wrestling Organization. Osbourne's pursuit of the belt lasted nearly nine months and culminated in a three-way match with (then-champion) "Luscious" Johnny Graham and "Sexy" Shane Shadows.

Osbourne spent the first few months of 2005 wrestling on the Florida circuit before returning to the Mid-Atlantic region to wrestle for the SWO, Pro Wrestling Entertainment and the World Wide Wrestling Alliance (he was the Heavyweight Champion in each promotion).

In the Spring of 2006, Osbourne won the World Professional Wrestling Tag Team Titles with his partner The Cremator. In early 2007, Osbourne turned on Cremator and they began a violent feud. The rivalry ended on June 9, 2007, with Osbourne defeating Cremator in a casket match during WPW's annual Summer Extravaganza card in Reading, Pennsylvania.

In September 2006 Osbourne return to his home-base of many years, Delaware's East Coast Wrestling Association. He also debuted in Pennsylvania's Blackball'd Wrestling Organization and continued to appear for U.S. promotions such as Dynamite Championship Wrestling, Pro Wrestling Entertainment, Devastation Wrestling Federation, New Age Wrestling, WPW, and the World Wide Wrestling Alliance. On August 24, 2007, he pinned Larry Zbyszko for the WWWA U.S. Heavyweight Title. In September 2008, Osbourne defeated fellow independent wrestling veteran Ace Darling in a loser-must-retire match, as well as teaming with Nate Hatred to win the World Professional Wrestling Tag Team Championship for a second time.

Glen Osbourne was ranked in the Pro Wrestling Illustrated Top 500 issue for 12 straight years (1994–2005) reaching a peak ranking of #128 in 1998. He reappeared in the 2008 edition ranking #175.

Osbourne retired from professional wrestling in 2011.

== Championships and accomplishments ==
- Blackball'd Wrestling Organization
  - BWO Heavyweight Championship (1 time)
- Delaware Championship Wrestling
  - DCW Heavyweight Championship (1 time)
- Dynamite Championship Wrestling
  - DCW Heavyweight Championship (3 times)
- East Coast Wrestling Association
  - ECWA Heavyweight Championship (2 times)
  - ECWA Mid-Atlantic Heavyweight Championship (2 times)
  - ECWA Hall of Fame (Class of 1996)
- Eastern Championship Wrestling
  - ECW Television Championship (1 time)
- Independent Professional Wrestling Alliance
  - IPWA Tag Team Championship (2 times) - with Rockin' Rebel
- Independent Superstars of Professional Wrestling
  - ISPW Tag Team Championship (1 time) - with Julio Dinero
- Mid-Eastern Wrestling Federation
  - MEWF Heavyweight Championship (1 time)
  - MEWF Tag Team Championship (3 times) - with Rockin' Rebel
- Pennsylvania Championship Wrestling
  - PCW Heavyweight Championship (1 time)
  - PCW Tag Team Championship (2 times) - with Ace Darling (1) and Flash Flanagan (1)
  - King of PCW (1999)
- Pro Wrestling Entertainment
  - PWE Heavyweight Championship (1 time)
- Pro Wrestling Illustrated
  - PWI ranked him #300 of the top 500 singles wrestlers in the PWI 500 in 2010
- Susquehanna Wrestling Organization
  - SWO Unlimited World Championship (1 time)
- Trans-Atlantic Wrestling Network
  - Trans-Atlantic Television Championship (1 time)
- World Professional Wrestling
  - WPW Tag Team Championship (2 times) - with The Cremator (1) and Nate Hatred (1)
- World Wide Wrestling Alliance
  - WWWA Heavyweight Championship (2 times)
  - WWWA Intercontinental Championship (1 time)
  - WWWA Television Championship (1 time)
  - WWWA United States Heavyweight Championship (1 time)
- Other titles
  - ACW Heavyweight Championship (1 time)
  - LWF Heavyweight Championship (1 time)
  - NAW Pennsylvania Commonwealth Championship (1 time)
  - POW Tag Team Championship (1 time) - with Rockin' Rebel
