= Damian Adams =

American professional wrestler (born 1978)

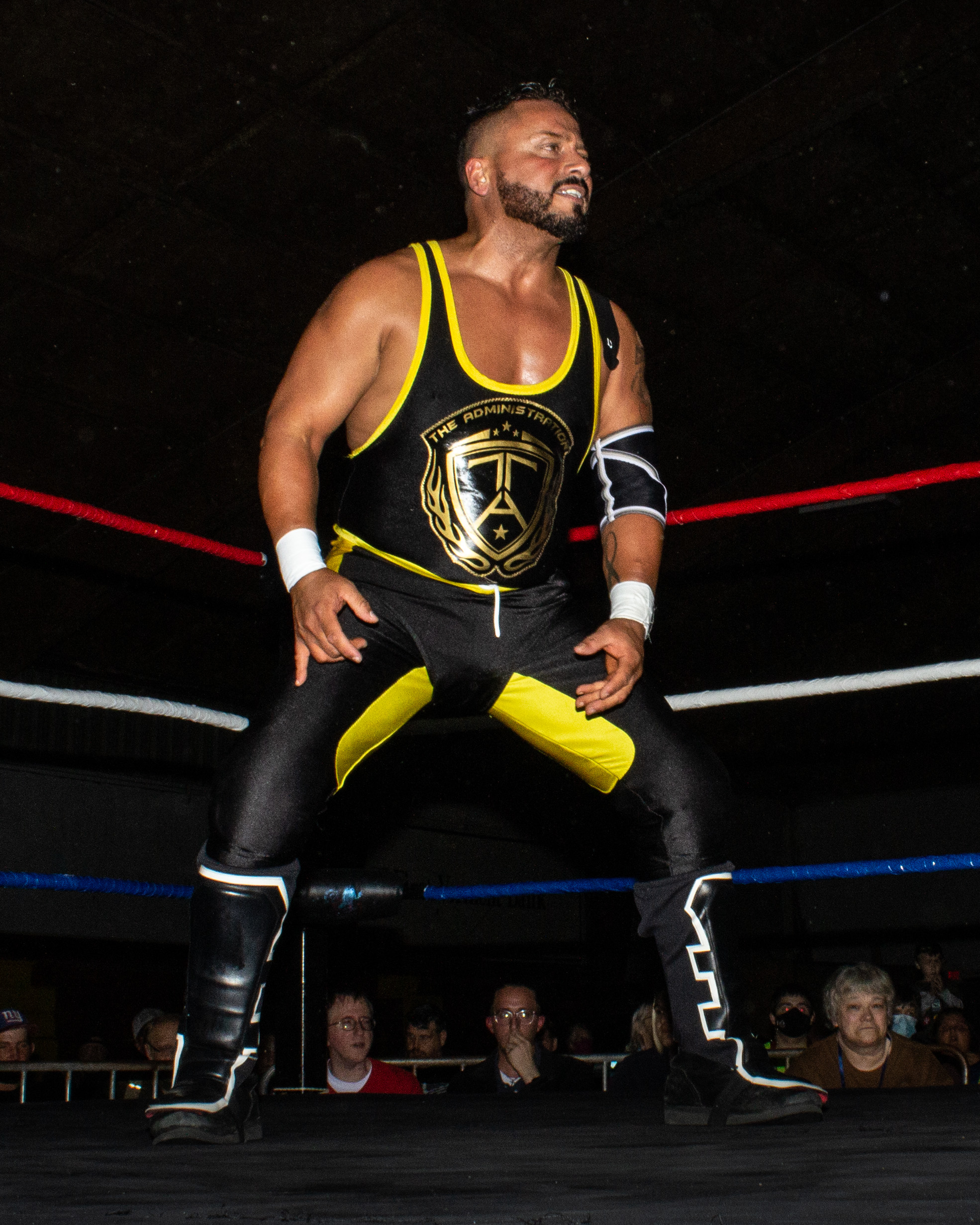

Personal information
- Born: Luis Almovodar; October 11, 1978 (age 48) The Bronx, New York, U.S.

Professional wrestling career
- Billed height: 5 ft 9 in (1.75 m)
- Billed weight: 202 lb (92 kg)
- Billed from: Hackettstown, New Jersey
- Trained by: Independent Wrestling Federation; Ohio Valley Wrestling
- Debut: 2000

Luis Almovodar (born October 11, 1978) is an American professional wrestler better known by his ring name Damian Adams.

== Professional wrestling career ==
=== IWF and independent circuit (2000–2005) ===
Adams began his career in 2000 in Independent Wrestling Federation in West Paterson, New Jersey. He wrestled in TNA Impact TNA Xplosion in a losing effort to Mad Mikey. Adams also teamed with Robbie E. in a losing effort to Team Canada. Throughout his early career, Adams wrestled in many independent wrestling promotions, IWF-New Jersey, NWS-New Jersey, CCW-Connecticut, 3PW-Pennsylvania, IHPW-New Jersey, SSCW-New Jersey, ECPW-New Jersey, WWA-Massachusetts, MEW-Maine, ACW-Maine, XIW-Virginia, PWF-Pennsylvania, WXW-Pennsylvania, NWA Wildside-Georgia, DCW-Delaware, Southern AllStar Wrestling-Tennessee, EWF-Indiana, NYSWF-New York, NYWC-New York, OVW-Louisville, Kentucky. His two biggest breaks came when he and Josh Daniels lost a match To former WWE Tag Team Champions Road Warrior Animal & Heidenreich on WWE Smackdown from Bridgeport, CT and when he and Johnny Candido lost to Axl Rotten & Balls Mahoney in 2005 on WWE Raw in East Rutherford, NJ.

=== World Wrestling Entertainment (2005–2008) ===
Adams was invited to WWE's developmental territory OVW in early 2005 and made his debut against in a losing effort to Danny Inferno. Damian was trained by Rip Rogers while in OVW. While in OVW, Damian tore his PCL, putting him out of action for 3–4 months. In 2008 Damian left OVW and returned to the independent wrestling scene in the northeast.

=== Return to the independent circuit (2008–present) ===
Since his departure from the then WWE developmental territory Ohio Valley Wrestling, Adams has wrestled in OCW and S.A.W. in 2007 and 2008, where he a had reign as S.A.W. Heavyweight Champion losing it to Kid Kash. He has been an extra on several occasions on Raw, and SmackDown, most recently appearing as hired private security for Chris Jericho. Adams was an instructor at IWF, ECPW & D2W pro wrestling schools based in New Jersey. He currently instructs at a pro wrestling academy in Great Meadows, NJ.

== Championships and accomplishments ==
- East Coast Pro Wrestling
  - ECPW Light Heavyweight Championship (1 time)
- East Coast Wrestling Association
  - ECWA Tag Team Championship (2 times) – with Ricky Martinez (1) and AJ Pan, Azrieal, Ricky Martinez and Romeo Roselli (1)^{1}
- International Wrestling Alliance
  - IWA Light Heavyweight Championship (1 time)
  - IWA Tag Team Championship (1 time) – with Rob Eckos
- Independent Wrestling Federation
  - IWF American Championship (1 time)
  - IWF Heavyweight Championship (2 times)
- National Wrestling Superstars
  - NWS Junior Heavyweight Championship (1 time)
- Ohio Championship Wrestling
  - OCW United States Championship (1 time)
- Showtime All-Star Wrestling
  - S.A.W. Heavyweight Championship (1 time)
- Stars and Stripes Championship Wrestling
  - SSCW Heavyweight Championship (1 time)
  - SSCW Television Championship (1 time)
- Victory Pro Wrestling
  - VPW Tag Team Championship (1 time) - with Bison
- D2W Pro Wrestling
  - D2W International Championship (1 time)
  - D2W Heavyweight Championship (1 time)

^{1}Adams, Azrieal, Pan, Martinez and Roselli defend the title under the Freebird Rule.
