= Xavier (wrestler) =

American professional wrestler (1977–2020)

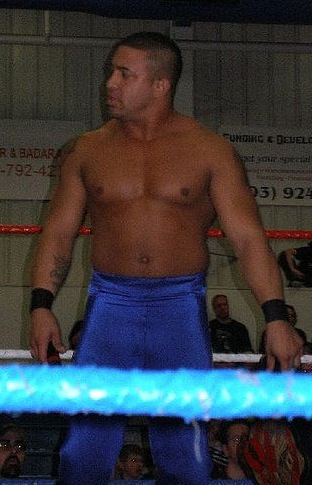
- Xavier in 2007

Personal information
- Born: John Jairo Bedoya Jr. December 28, 1977 Queens, New York, United States
- Died: August 16, 2020 (aged 42) Pawtucket, Rhode Island, United States

Professional wrestling career
- Ring name(s): Johnny Jirus; John Xavier; Juan Xavier; Xavier
- Billed height: 5 ft 9 in (175 cm)
- Billed weight: 215 lb (98 kg)
- Billed from: Hartford, Connecticut, United States
- Trained by: Tony DeVito
- Debut: 1997
- Retired: 2011

John Jairo Bedoya Jr. (December 28, 1977 – August 16, 2020) was an American professional wrestler, better known by the ring name Xavier. He was best known for his appearances with Ring of Honor (ROH) between 2002 and 2004, where he was the second ROH World Champion.

== Early life ==
John Jairo Bedoya Jr. was born on December 28, 1977, in Queens, New York.

== Professional wrestling career ==
=== Independent circuit (1997–2011) ===
Bedoya trained under Tony DeVito before debuting in 1995. He wrestled for various independent promotions in New York City, adopting the ring name "Xavier". Xavier competed for numerous independent promotions throughout his career, including USA Pro Wrestling, UXW, Pro-Pain Pro Wrestling (3PW), East Coast Wrestling Association (ECWA), MXW, Jersey All Pro Wrestling (JAPW), New York Wrestling Connection (NYWC), Northeast Wrestling (NEW), and Chaotic Wrestling.

=== Ring of Honor (2002–2004) ===
Xavier appeared on the first ever Ring of Honor (ROH) show, The Era of Honor Begins, on February 23, 2002, defeating Scoot Andrews. Throughout the following months, Xavier feuded with Andrews and James Maritato. He took part in the Road to the Title tournament, attempting to become the number one contender to the ROH Championship, but was eliminated in the first round by Amazing Red. After decisively defeating Andrews on several occasions, Xavier requested, and was granted, a shot at the ROH Championship. He faced the incumbent champion, Low Ki, on September 21, 2002, and defeated Low-Ki in a match which saw extensive cheating on the part of Xavier and interference from Christopher Daniels. Following his victory, the newly crowned champion joined Daniels' heel stable, The Prophecy, turning heel. With the help of The Prophecy, Xavier successfully defended his title against Jay Briscoe, A.J. Styles and, on two occasions, Paul London, before losing to Samoa Joe at Night of Champions on March 22, 2003.

Following his defeat, Xavier was absent for several months. He returned to ROH at Death Before Dishonor on July 19, 2003, and subsequently turned his back on The Prophecy. He lost to his former partner, Christopher Daniels, in a match for the number one contendership on August 16 at Bitter Friends, Stiffer Enemies. Throughout the remainder of the year, Xavier took part in the Field of Honor tournament, losing to Matt Stryker in the semi-finals, and feuded with R. J. Brewer, culminating in a "Fight Without Honor" at Final Battle 2003 on December 27 which was won by Walters.

In 2004, Xavier joined The Embassy, a heel stable led by Prince Nana. He remained in The Embassy until April 2004, when he was sidelined for six months with a shoulder injury. He recovered from his injury in December 2004 and returned to the independent circuit.

=== World Wrestling Federation / World Wrestling Entertainment (2002-2003, 2005, 2007) ===
Xavier first appeared in World Wrestling Entertainment (WWF) on January 7, 2002, losing to Perry Saturn on an episode of WWF Jakked/Metal. He made further appearances on WWE Velocity in 2003, losing to Chuck Palumbo, Bill DeMott and Spanky respectively. Over the following two years, Xavier made several appearances with WWE as an extra in angles. On the December 31, 2005 episode of Velocity, he lost to Paul Burchill in a match that saw him use the name "John Xavier". On May 11, 2007, Xavier teamed up with Scotty Charisma to take on Eugene and Jim Duggan.

=== Return to ROH (2006–2007) ===
Xavier returned to ROH on February 11, 2006, challenging Bryan Danielson for the ROH World Championship after Embassy member Alex Shelley missed the event due to weather conditions. He lost to Danielson by disqualification following interference from Jimmy Rave, another member of The Embassy.

On February 16, 2007, Xavier returned to ROH to replace an injured Davey Richards in a "four-way fray" match involving SHINGO, Jack Evans and Jimmy Jacobs. He was eliminated first.

Xavier was set to return in March 2020 for ROH's "Past vs. Present" event against Jay Lethal but the plans were halted due to the COVID-19 pandemic.

=== Total Nonstop Action Wrestling (2010) ===
On July 26, 2010, Bedoya wrestled in a tryout dark match for Total Nonstop Action Wrestling (TNA), losing to Douglas Williams.

== Mixed martial arts career ==
Xavier began competing in mixed martial arts in 2009, fighting under the name John Xavier. He won his first fight via 14-second knockout. In his second and final fight he lost via decision. Both bouts were under amateur rules; he never competed in a professional MMA bout.

== Death ==
Bedoya died on August 16, 2020, aged 42, in Rhode Island. No cause of death was released.

== Championships and accomplishments ==
- Defiant Championship Wrestling
  - DCW Heavyweight Championship (1 time)
- East Coast Wrestling Association
  - ECWA Heavyweight Championship (1 time)
  - ECWA Tag Team Championship (1 time) – with Low Ki
- Impact Championship Wrestling
  - ICW Heavyweight Championship (3 times)
  - ICW North Eastern Championship (1 time)
  - ICW Tag Team Championship (1 time) - with Christopher Daniels
  - Impact Cup (2010) - with Christopher Daniels
- Jersey All Pro Wrestling
  - JAPW Light Heavyweight Championship (1 time)
- New Age Wrestling Federation
  - NAWF Connecticut Cup Championship (1 time)
  - Connecticut Cup (2002)
- New York Wrestling Connection
  - NYWC Interstate Championship (1 time)
- Northeast Wrestling
  - NEW Championship (1 time)
  - NWA Northeast Television Championship (1 time)
- Ring of Honor
  - ROH World Championship (1 time)
- Ultimate Championship Wrestling
  - UCW North Eastern Championship (1 time)
- USA Xtreme Wrestling
  - UXW Heavyweight Championship (1 time)
  - UXW United States Championship (1 time)
  - UXW X-treme Championship (2 times)
  - UXW Tag Team Championship (1 time) – with Low Ki
- Wrestling Superstars Unleashed
  - WSU Heavyweight Championship (1 time)
  - Battle For The Belt (2006)

== See also ==
- List of premature professional wrestling deaths
