= Aden Chambers =

American wrestler (born 1980)

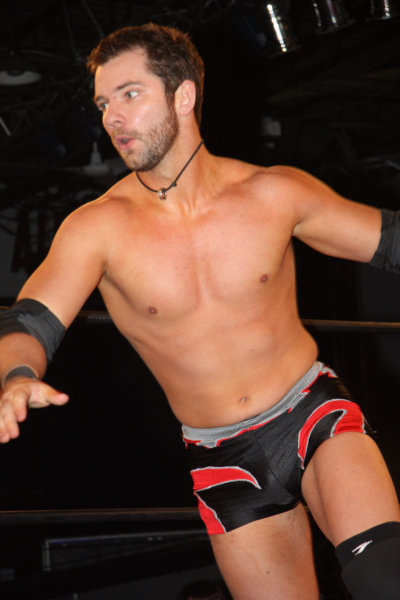
- Aden Chambers in Ring Of Honor (2010)

Personal information
- Born: Scott Beach; November 15, 1980 (age 45) California, U.S.

Professional wrestling career
- Ring name: Aden Chambers
- Billed height: 6 ft 0 in (1.83 m)
- Billed weight: 180 lb (82 kg)
- Billed from: Raleigh, North Carolina
- Trained by: Jay & Mark Briscoe; Ace Darling; Mark Shrader
- Debut: February 2001

Scott Beach (born November 15, 1980), also known by the ring name Aden Chambers, is an American semi-retired professional wrestler. He is best known for his appearances with the East Coast Wrestling Association (ECWA) in the 2000s.

== Professional wrestling career ==
=== ECWA (2004–2013) ===
In the East Coast Wrestling Association he teamed with Kekoa the Flyin Hawaiian to win the 2012 K-CUP, resulting in Aden being entered into their 2013 Hall of Fame as the only man to win every championship and tournament in the company, having won the ECWA Heavyweight, Mid-Atlantic, Tag Team, and 2008 ECWA Super 8 Tournament. He retired from the company after this.

== Championships and accomplishments ==
- East Coast Wrestling Association
  - ECWA Heavyweight Championship (1 time)
  - ECWA Mid-Atlantic Championship (1 time)
  - ECWA Tag Team Championship (2 times) – with Andrew Ryker and Kekoa the Flyin Hawaiian
  - ECWA Super 8 Tournament (2008)
  - ECWA K-Cup Tournament (2012)
  - ECWA Hall of Fame (Class of 2013)
- Fusion Wrestling
  - Fusion Wrestling Tag Team Championship – with Brandon Day
- Maryland Championship Wrestling
  - Shane Shamrock Memorial Cup finalist (2009, 2011)
- NWA Anarchy
  - NWA Anarchy Young Lions Championship (1 time)
- Pro Wrestling Illustrated
  - PWI ranked him # 332 of the 500 best singles wrestlers of the PWI 500 in 2007
  - PWI ranked him # 324 of the 500 best singles wrestlers of the PWI 500 in 2008
  - PWI ranked him # 270 of the 500 best singles wrestlers of the PWI 500 in 2009
  - PWI ranked him # 308 of the 500 best singles wrestlers of the PWI 500 in 2010
  - PWI ranked him # 316 of the 500 best singles wrestlers of the PWI 500 in 2011
  - PWI ranked him # 310 of the 500 best singles wrestlers of the PWI 500 in 2012
