= ECWA Super 8 Tournament =

List of professional wrestling Super 8 tournaments

- ECWA Super 8 Tournament 2023 logo
- Promotions: East Coast Wrestling Association
- First event: 1997

The Super 8 Tournament is an annual professional wrestling tournament held by the East Coast Wrestling Association. The tournament is contested by eight wrestlers in a one-night single-elimination format.

== History ==
The ECWA Super 8 Tournament was first held in 1997 and was won by Ace Darling. The 2011 tournament was broadcast live as an internet pay-per-view for the first time. The 2011 tournament was also the first time the tournament had been held outside of Delaware. Christopher Daniels and Darius Carter are the only two time winners.

=== Winners ===
Year	Winner
1997	Ace Darling
1998	Lance Diamond
1999	Steve Bradley
2000	Christopher Daniels
2001	Low Ki
2002	Donovan Morgan
2003	Paul London
2004	Christopher Daniels
2005	Petey Williams
2006	Davey Richards
2007	Jerry Lynn
2008	Aden Chambers
2009	Nick Logan
2010	Austin Creed
2011	Tommaso Ciampa
2012	Papadon
2013	Damian Dragon
2014	Matt Cross
2015	Jason Kincaid
2016	Napalm Bomb
2017	Sean Carr
2018	Richard Holliday
2019	Lance Anoa'i
2020	A Very Good Professional Wrestler
2021	Killian Mcmurphy
2022	Darius Carter
2023	Joey Ace
2024	Darius Carter
2025	Leo Sparrow

== Past tournament results ==
=== 1997 ===
ECWA 1st Annual Super 8 Tournament
- Date: February 22, 1997
- City: Wilmington, Delaware
- Venue: St. Matthew's Parish

The inaugural Super 8 Tournament took part on February 22, 1997, at the St. Matthew's Parish in Wilmington, Delaware. In the tournament finals, Ace Darling defeated Cheetah Master (accompanied by WWE Hall of Famer Lou Albano) to win the tournament and the vacant ECWA Television Championship.

Quarterfinals
1	Billy Kidman	Pin
8	Reckless Youth
4	Cheetah Master	Pin
5	Devon Storm
2	Lance Diamond	Pin
7	Ravishing Ronny
3	Ace Darling	Pin
6	Inferno Kid

Semifinals
Billy Kidman
Cheetah Master	Pin
Lance Diamond
Ace Darling	Pin

Final
Cheetah Master
Ace Darling	Pin

=== 1998 ===
ECWA 2nd Annual Super 8 Tournament
- Date: March 21, 1998
- City: Wilmington, Delaware
- Venue: Saint Matthews Parish Hall

The second Super 8 Tournament took part on March 21, 1998, at the Saint Matthews Parish Hall in Wilmington, Delaware. Lance Diamond won the tournament after defeating Inferno Kid in the finals.

Quarterfinals
1	Ace Darling	Pin
8	Mike Quackenbush	9:42
4	Inferno Kid	Pin
5	Devon Storm	14:15
2	Lance Diamond	Pin
7	Mark Shrader	8:55
3	Scott Taylor	Pin
6	Reckless Youth	12:42

Semifinals
Ace Darling	8:29
Inferno Kid	Pin
Lance Diamond	Pin
Scott Taylor	9:06

Final
Inferno Kid	14:31
Lance Diamond	Pin

=== 1999 ===
February 27 in Wilmington, Delaware

Quarterfinals
1	Steve Bradley	W
8	Ace Darling
4	Devon Storm	W
5	Jeff Hardy
2	Matt Hardy	W
7	Christian York
3	Christopher Daniels	W
6	Jeff Peterson

Semifinals
Steve Bradley	W
Devon Storm
Matt Hardy
Christopher Daniels	W

Final
Steve Bradley
Christopher Daniels	W

=== 2000 ===
February 26 in Newport, Delaware

Quarterfinals
1	Scoot Andrews	W
8	Trent Acid
4	Chad Collyer	W
5	Shark Boy
2	Jet Jaguar	W
7	Jeff Peterson
3	Christopher Daniels	W
6	Vic Capri

Semifinals
Scoot Andrews	W
Chad Collyer
Ace Darling (replacing an injured Jet Jaguar)
Christopher Daniels	W

Final
Scoot Andrews
Christopher Daniels	W

=== 2001 ===
February 24 in Wilmington, Delaware

Quarterfinals
1	Low Ki	W
8	Billy Fives
4	Jayson Reign	W
5	Tony Kozina
2	American Dragon	W
7	Spanky
3	Reckless Youth	W
6	Mike Sullivan

Semifinals
Low Ki	W
Jayson Reign
American Dragon
Reckless Youth	W

Final
Low Ki
American Dragon	W

=== 2002 ===
March 2 in Wilmington, Delaware

Quarterfinals
1	Amazing Red	W
8	Bobby Rude
4	A.J. Styles	W
5	Xavier
2	Jamie Noble	W
7	Matt Stryker
3	Donovan Morgan	W
6	Pepper Parks

Semifinals
Amazing Red	W
A.J. Styles
Jamie Noble
Donovan Morgan	W

Final
A.J. Styles
Donovan Morgan	W

=== 2003 ===
April 5 in Wilmington, Delaware

Quarterfinals
1	Frankie Kazarian	W
8	Chris Sabin
4	Paul London	W
5	Alex Arion
2	Chance Beckett	W
7	Sedrick Strong
3	Spanky	W
6	Chris Cage

Semifinals
Frankie Kazarian
Paul London	W
Chance Beckett
Spanky	W

Final
Paul London	W
Chance Beckett

=== 2004 ===
April 3 in Wilmington, Delaware

Quarterfinals
1	Austin Aries	W
8	Shawn Daivari^{†}
4	R. J. Brewer	W
5	Nicho
2	Christopher Daniels	W
7	Rocky Romero
3	Mike Kruel	W
6	Ricky Reyes

Semifinals
Austin Aries	W
R. J. Brewer
Christopher Daniels
Mike Kruel	W

Final
Austin Aries
Christopher Daniels	W

^{†}Daivari replaced the injured Tyson Dux

=== 2005 ===
April 9 in Newark, Delaware

Quarterfinals
1	Puma	W
8	Eric Matlock
4	J. J. Perez	W
5	Tyson Dux
2	Petey Williams	W
7	Rory Fox
3	Alex Shelley	W
6	Andrew Ryker

Semifinals
Puma	W
J.J. Perez
Petey Williams
Alex Shelley	W

Final
Puma
Petey Williams	W

=== 2006 ===
April 8 in Newark, Delaware

Quarterfinals
1	Charlie Haas	W
8	Xavier
4	Josh Daniels	W
5	Andre Lyonz
2	Davey Richards	W
7	Scott Lost
3	Milano Collection A.T.	W
6	Bryan Logan

Semifinals
Charlie Haas	W
Josh Daniels
Davey Richards
Milano Collection A.T.	W

Final
Charlie Haas
Davey Richards	W

=== 2007 ===
November 10 in Newark, Delaware

Quarterfinals
1	Rob Eckos	W
8	Billy Bax
4	Sonjay Dutt^{†}	W
5	Human Tornado
2	Jerry Lynn	W
7	Brian Fury
3	Matt Logan	W
6	Rob Conway

Semifinals
Rob Eckos	W
Sonjay Dutt
Jerry Lynn
Matt Logan	W

Final
Sonjay Dutt
Jerry Lynn	W

^{†} Dutt replaced Matt Cross, who was injured.

=== 2008 ===
October 25 in Newark, Delaware

Quarterfinals
1	Aden Chambers	W
8	Frankie Arion
4	Maverick	W
5	Loca Vida
2	Chase Del Monte	W
7	Scott Reed
3	Alex Koslov	W
6	Shannon Moore

Semifinals
Aden Chambers	W
Maverick
Chase Del Monte
Alex Koslov	W

Final
Aden Chambers
Alex Koslov	W

=== 2009 ===
October 10 in Newark, Delaware

Quarterfinals
1	Tommaso Ciampa	W
8	Mike Tobin
4	Dan Eckos	W
5	Metal Master
2	Quiet Storm	W
7	Mikaze
3	Nick Logan	W
6	Prince Nana

Semifinals
Tommaso Ciampa	W
Dan Eckos
Quiet Storm
Nick Logan	W

Final
Tommaso Ciampa
Nick Logan	W

=== 2010 ===
July 10 in Newark, Delaware

Quarterfinals
1	Tommaso Ciampa	W
8	Chase Del Monte^{†}
4	Chris Wylde	W
5	Alex Reynolds
2	U–Gene	W
7	Scott Wright
3	Austin Creed	W
6	Brian Milonas

Semifinals
Tommaso Ciampa	W
Chris Wylde
U-Gene
Austin Creed	W

Final
Tommaso Ciampa
Austin Creed	W

^{†} Del Monte replaced Barry Ryte, who was injured.

=== 2011 ===
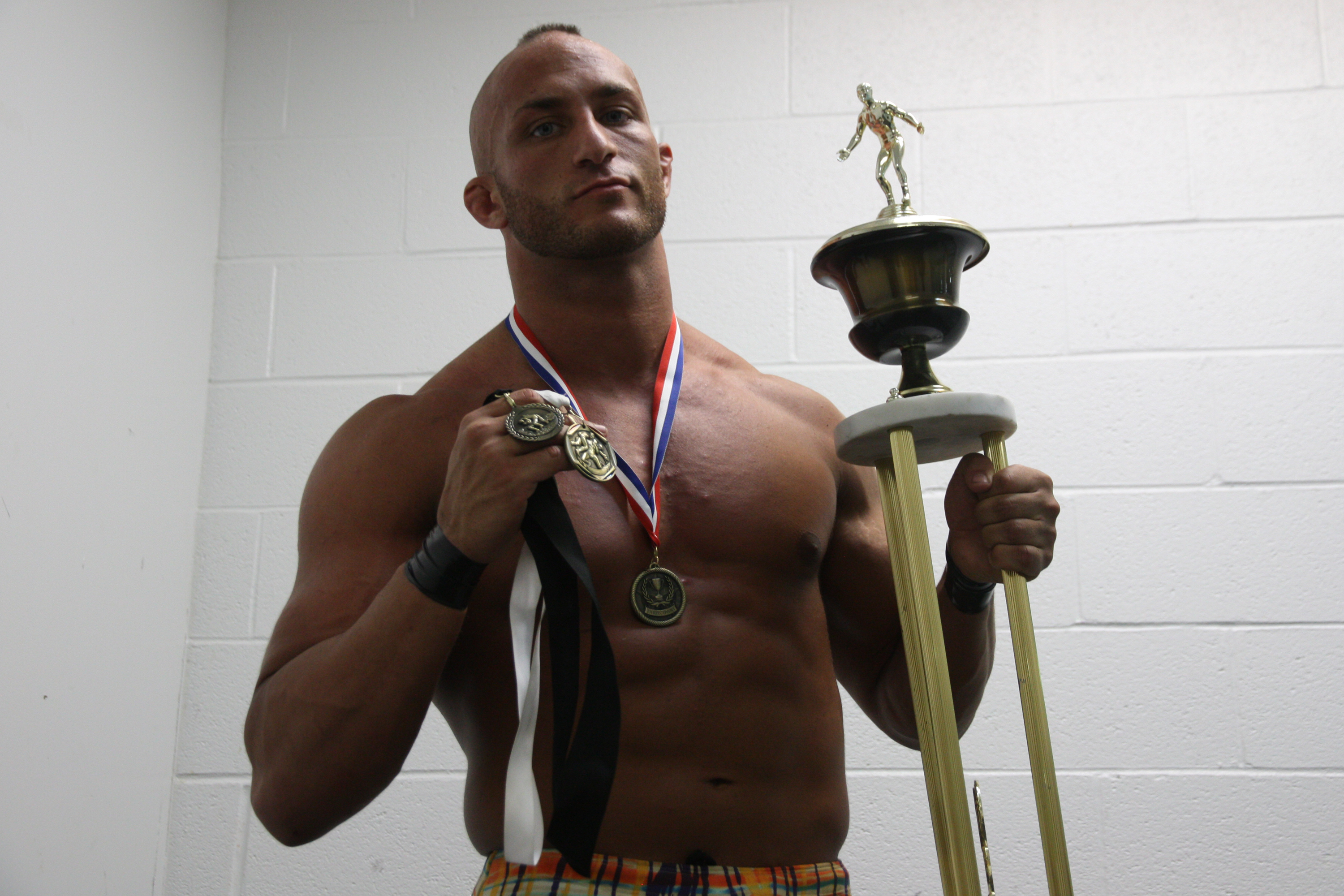
2011 Tournament winner Tommaso Ciampa holding that year's trophy

April 30 in Voorhees, New Jersey

Quarterfinals
1	Adam Cole	Pin
8	Sami Callihan
4	Austin Aries	W
5	Bobby Shields
2	Tommaso Ciampa	W
7	Rich Swann
3	Shiima Xion	W
6	Shockwave the Robot

Semifinals
Adam Cole	W
Austin Aries
Tommaso Ciampa	W
Shiima Xion

Final
Adam Cole
Tommaso Ciampa	W

=== 2012 ===
April 7 in Newark, Delaware

Quarterfinals
1	Bandido, Jr.	Pin
8	Azrieal
4	Gregory Iron	Pin
5	Kyle Matthews
2	Bobby Fish	Submission
7	Kekoa “The Flyin’ Hawaiian”
3	Papadon	Pin
6	Tony Nese

Semifinals
Bandido, Jr.	Pin
Gregory Iron
Bobby Fish
Papadon	Pin

Final
Bandido, Jr.
Papadon	Pin

=== 2013 ===
April 13 in Newark, Delaware

Quarterfinals
1	Mike Mondo	W
8	VsK
4	Damian Dragon	W
5	Chris Wylde
2	Antonio Thomas	W
7	Rhett Titus
3	Papadon	W
6	Vordell Walker

Semifinals
Mike Mondo	W
Damian Dragon
Antonio Thomas
Papadon	W

Final
Damian Dragon
Papadon	W

=== 2014 ===
April 5 in Newark, Delaware

Quarterfinals
1	John Skyler	W
8	Steven Walters
4	Kao Storm	W
5	Matt Saigon
2	Matt Cross	W
7	Gran Akuma
3	Ricky Martinez	W
6	Oliver Grimsly

Semifinals
John Skyler	W
Kao Storm
Matt Cross
Ricky Martinez	W

Final
John Skyler
Matt Cross	W

=== 2015 ===
March 21 in Woodbury Heights, New Jersey

Quarterfinals
1	Corey Hollis	W
8	BJ Hancock
4	Sean Carr	W
5	Napalm Bomb
2	Jaxson James	W
7	Breaker Morant
3	Jason Kincaid	W
6	Kai Katana

Semifinals
Corey Hollis	W
Sean Carr
Jaxson James
Jason Kincaid	W

Final
Corey Hollis
Jason Kincaid	W

=== 2016 ===
April 23 in Woodbury Heights, New Jersey

Quarterfinals
1	Jason Kincaid	W
8	Kekoa The Flyin Hawaiian
4	John Skyler	W
5	Scotty 2 Hotty
2	Napalm Bomb	W
7	Danny Inferno
3	Aden Chambers	W
6	Papadon

Semifinals
Jason Kincaid	W
John Skyler
Napalm Bomb
Papadon	W

Final
John Skyler
Napalm Bomb	W

=== 2017 ===
April 29 in Woodbury Heights, New Jersey

Quarterfinals
1	Lio Rush	W
8	Anthony Bennett
4	Leon St. Giovanni
5	Zombie King	W
2	Timmy Lou Retton	W
7	"Chainsaw" Joe Gacy
3	Brandon Scott	W
6	"Hybrid" Sean Carr

Semifinals
Lio Rush	W
Zombie King
"Chainsaw" Joe Gacy
"Hybrid" Sean Carr	W

Final
Lio Rush
"Hybrid" Sean Carr	W

=== 2018 ===
April 21 in New Castle, Delaware

Quarterfinals
1	Ty Awesome	W
8	Smiley
4	Mike Law	W
5	Chase Owens
2	Anthony Greene	W
7	Cheeseburger
3	Richard Holliday	W
6	Bolt Brady

Semifinals
Ty Awesome	W
Chase Owens
Anthony Greene
Richard Holliday	W

Final
Chase Owens
Richard Holliday	W

=== 2019 ===
April 20 in Philadelphia, PA

Quarterfinals
1	Lance Anoa'i	W
8	Tim Zbyszko
4	Marshall Von Erich	W
5	Wes Brisco
2	Leland Race	W
7	Ross Von Erich
3	Brian Pillman Jr.	W
6	Colby Corino

Semifinals
Lance Anoa'i	W
Marshall Von Erich
Leland Race
Brian Pillman Jr.	W

Final
Lance Anoa'i	W
Brian Pillman Jr.

=== 2020 ===
September 19, 2020 in Morganville NJ

Quarterfinals
1	A Very Good Professional Wrestler	W
8	Eric Martin
4	Archadia	W
5	Vinny Pacifico
2	Matt Tremont	W
7	Chris Rockwell
3	KTB	W
6	Devantes

Semifinals
A Very Good Professional Wrestler	W
Archadia
Matt Tremont
KTB	W

Final
A Very Good Professional Wrestler	W
KTB

=== 2021 ===
May 1, 2021 in Morganville, NJ.

Quarterfinals
1	A Very Good Professional Wrestler
8	Alex Anthony
4	Matt Makowski
5	Timmy Lou Retton
2	Killian McMurphy
7	Bam Sullivan
3	Devon Storm
6	Mike Law

Semifinals
A Very Good Professional Wrestler
Matt Makowski
Killian McMurphy
Devon Storm

Final
A Very Good Professional Wrestler
Killian McMurphy

=== 2022 ===
March 26 2022 in Marlboro NJ.

Quarterfinals
1	Erica Leigh
8	Eric Corvis
4	Eel O'Neal
5	"Fancy" Ryan Clancy
2	Darius Carter
7	Ricky Morton
3	Travis Huckabee
6	Encore Moore

Semifinals
Erica Leigh
Encore Moore
Darius Carter
Travis Huckabee

Final
Darius Carter
Erica Leigh

=== 2023 ===
March 25 2023 in Marlboro NJ.

Quarterfinals
1	Rabid Ryan Mooney
8	JGeorge
4	Joey Ace
5	Studio Andino
2	Sam Shields
7	Ellis Taylor
3	Channing Thomas
6	Rick Recon

Semifinals
Joey Ace
Rabid Ryan Mooney
Sam Shields
Channing Thomas

Final
Joey Ace
Sam Shields
