= The S.A.T. =

Professional wrestling tag team

The S.A.T
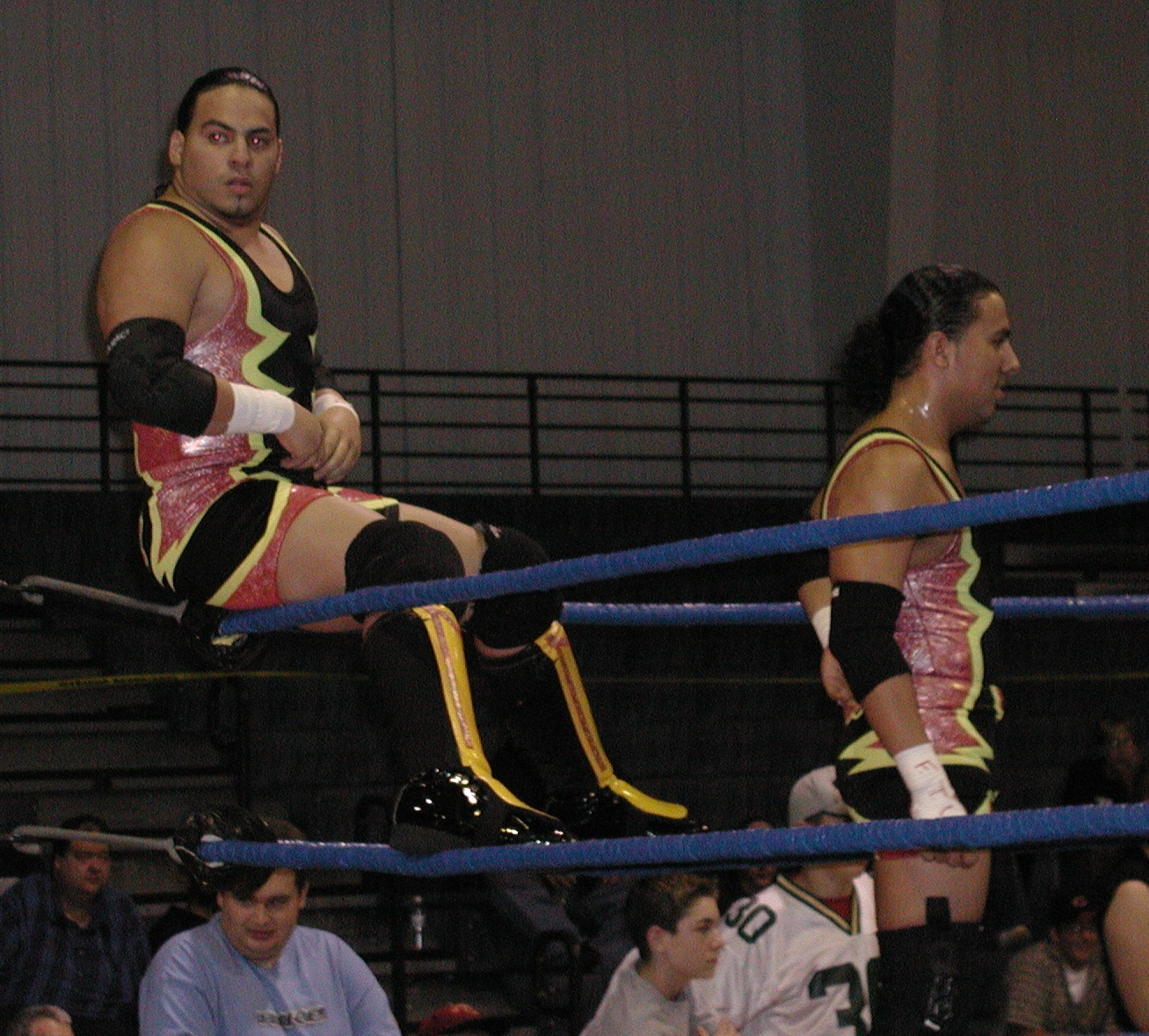

Stable
- Members: Joel Maximo; Wil Maximo; Jose Maximo
- Name(s): Los Maximos; The S.A.T. Six Point Four
- Billed heights: 5 ft 9 in (176 cm) – Jose; 5 ft 8 in (173 cm) – Joel
- Combined billed weight: 378 lb – combined 190 lb (86 kg) – Jose; 188 lb (85 kg) – Joel
- Hometown: Brooklyn, New York City, New York, United States
- Former members: Amazing Red
- Debut: 2000
- Trained by: Mike Awesome; Mikey Whipwreck

The S.A.T. (Spanish Announce Team) was a professional wrestling tag team mostly seen in independent promotions that consisted of brothers Jose Maximo (Kelvin Ramirez, born October 13, 1983) and Joel Maximo (Julio Ramirez, November 28, 1979) who were both born in Brooklyn, New York. The team was occasionally joined by their cousin; Amazing Red (Jonathan Figueroa).

== Career ==
Originally the brothers, both trained by Mikey Whipwreck and Mike Awesome, wrestled under the name Los Maximos, and also competed as Six Point Four in Fighting World of Japan Pro Wrestling. The S.A.T. and Amazing Red wrestled for Combat Zone Wrestling (CZW), and Ring of Honor (ROH) during the company's first two years, as well as being a part of Total Nonstop Action Wrestling (TNA), during the promotion's early years.

The brothers, under the name S.A.T., made a few appearances on WWE Velocity shows, in enhancement matches against the Basham Brothers and The Big Show. In addition, they briefly appeared in a commercial for the 2002 WWE King of the Ring

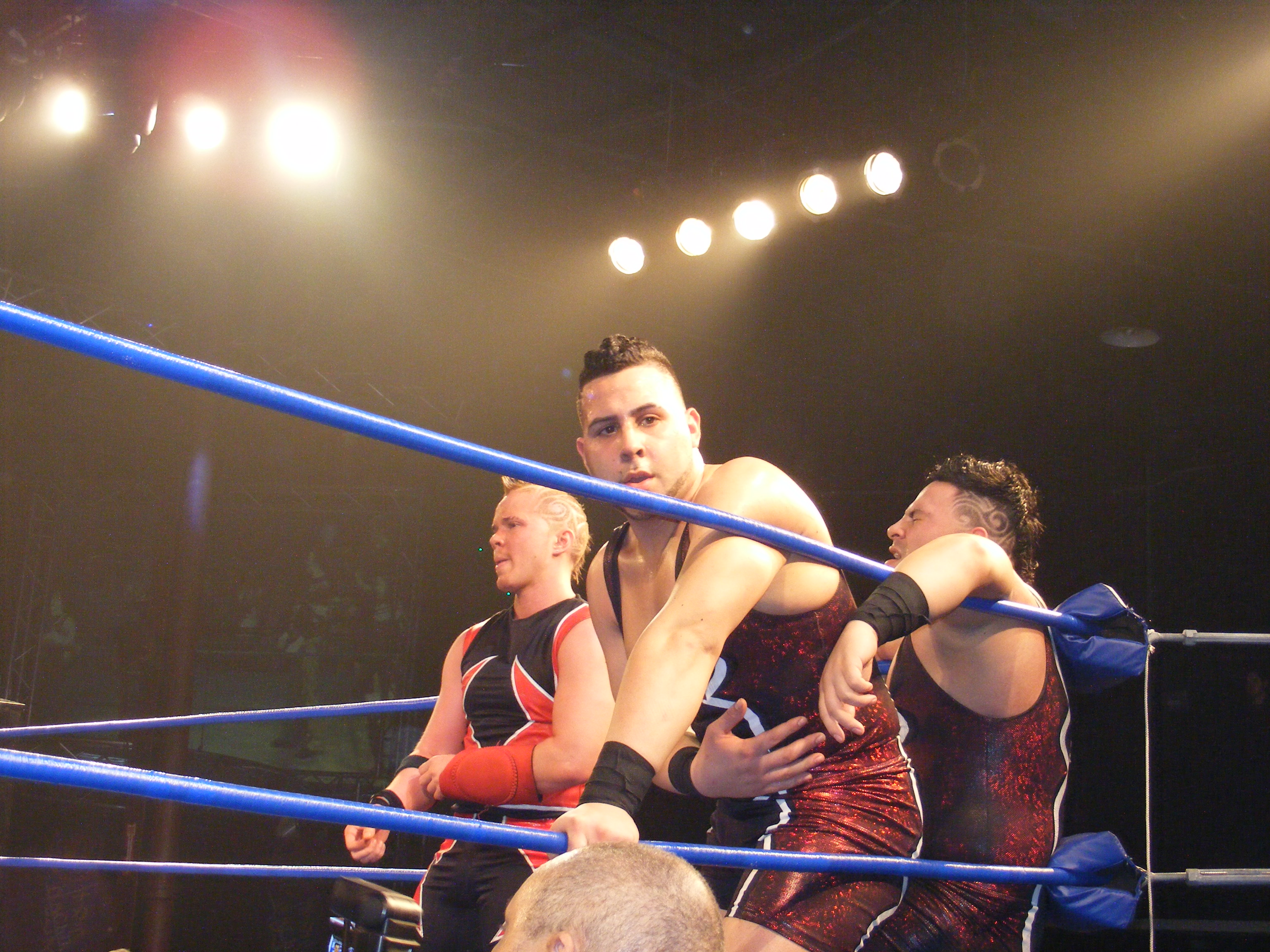
Amazing Red and Joel and Wil Maximo at Chikara's 2011 King of Trios in April 2011.

They appeared at Pro Wrestling Unplugged (PWU), where they feuded against All Money Is Legal (K-Murda and K-Pusha).

In July 2010, Jose decided to retire from wrestling and was replaced in the S.A.T. by Wil Maximo (Wilson Ramirez, born December 29, 1987).

On March 3, 2011, Chikara announced that the Maximos (Joel and Wil) would re-unite with the Amazing Red for the 2011 King of Trios tournament, starting on April 15. The team was eliminated from the tournament in the first round by Jigsaw, Manami Toyota and Mike Quackenbush.

On January 7, 2012 the Maximos beat Los Fugitivos de la Calle (Niche & Linx) to win the WWC World Tag Team Championship.

On December 3, 2021 Jose Maximo Returned to Pro Wrestling at ETU Expect The Unexpected to face the Mane Event (Jay Lyon & Midas Black)

On February 19, 2022, Joel Maximo & Jose Maximo faced The Briscoe brothers at GCW Believe Me.

On March 12, 2022, Joel Maximo & Jose Maximo Faced The Briscoe Brothers (Mark & Jay) and The Hardy Boys (Matt & Jeff) in the same night at Big Time Wrestling

On April 16, 2022, Joel Maximo, Jose Maximo & Wil Maximo Reunited as a Trio and faced The team of The Rock 'n' Roll Express (Ricky Morton & Robert Gibson) and Kerry Morton at Expect The Unexpected Era of The Unexpected

On May 5, 2022, The Maximos Faced The East West Express (Jordan Oliver & Nick Wayne) at GCW Life Goes On

On June 18, 2022, The SAT Joel Maximo, Jose Maximo & Wil Maximo Faced ASF, Drago Kid & Gringo Loco at GCW You Wouldn't Understand

On October 27, 2022, The Maximos Jose & Joel Faced Aussie Open (Kyle Fletcher & Mark Davis) at NJPW The Night Before Rumble On 44th Street: A Halloween Special

On December 10, 2022, The SAT Joel Maximo, Jose Maximo & Wil Maximo and the Debut of SkillzDaGreat Faced The Miracle Ones (Dustin Waller, Ichiban & Kylon King) at Expect The Unexpected We Don't Belong Here

== Championships and accomplishments ==
=== Joel Maximo and Jose Maximo ===
- East Coast Wrestling Association
  - ECWA Tag Team Championship (1 time)
- Impact Championship Wrestling
  - ICW Tag Team Championship (1 time)
- Jersey All Pro Wrestling
  - JAPW Tag Team Championship (1 time)
- Midwest Championship Wrestling
  - MCW Tag Team Championship (1 time)
- New York Wrestling Connection
  - NYWC Tag Team Championship (1 time, current)
  - Hall of Fame (2022)
- NWA Cyberspace
  - NWA Cyberspace Tag Team Championship (1 time; final)
- NWA Midwest
  - NWA Midwest Tag Team Championship (1 time)
- New Era Pro Wrestling
  - NEPW United States Tag Team Championship (1 time)
- Premier Wrestling Federation
  - PWF Universal Tag Team Championship (2 times)
- Pro Wrestling Unplugged
  - PWU Tag Team Championship (3 times)
- Ultimate Wrestling Federation
  - UWF Tag Team Championship (1 time)
- USA Pro Wrestling
  - USA Pro Tag Team Championship (3 times)

=== Joel Maximo and Wil Maximo ===
- Impact Championship Wrestling
  - ICW Tag Team Championship (1 time)
- World Wrestling Council
  - WWC World Tag Team Championship (1 time)
