= ECWA Territory Championship =

Professional wrestling

Details
- Promotion: East Coast Wrestling Association
- Date established: May 1, 2021
- Current champion: Abs Armstrong
Statistics
- First champion: Matt Vertigo

The ECWA Territory Championship is a professional wrestling championship created and promoted by the East Coast Wrestling Association (ECWA) promotion. The current champion is Abs Armstrong who won the title on October 22, 2022, on an Episode of ECWA Saturday Morning Slam.

== Title history ==
The Inaugural and current champion is Matt Vertigo, who defeated LA Vin and Steve Scott in a three-way match on the May 1, 2021, episode of ECWA 25th Annual Super 8 Tournament in Morganville, NJ.

Key
No.	Overall reign number
Reign	Reign number for the specific champion
Days	Number of days held
+	Current reign is changing daily

No.	Champion	Championship change			Reign statistics		Notes	Ref.
No.	Champion	Date	Event	Location	Reign	Days	Notes	Ref.
1	Matt Vertigo	May 1, 2021	ECWA 25th Annual Super 8 Tournament	Morganville, NJ	1	N/A	Defeated Steve Scott and LA Vin in a three-way match to become Inaugural champion.It is unknown how many days Matt Vertigo held the title due to the date being unknown when he lost the title.	
2	Abs Armstrong	N/A, N/A, N/A	N/A	N/A	1	N/A	Defeated Matt Vertigo in a match but it is unknown when.	
