= Scoot Andrews =

American professional wrestler (born 1967)

Personal information
- Born: Andrew Warner; June 1, 1967 (age 59) Charlotte, North Carolina, U.S.
- Website: ScootAndrews.net

Professional wrestling career
- Ring name(s): Scoot Andrews; Black Nature Boy
- Billed height: 5 ft 9 in (175 cm)
- Billed weight: 219 lb (99 kg)
- Trained by: Damien Lee; Hack Meyers
- Debut: September 24, 1994
- Retired: September 09, 2022

Andrew Warner (born June 1, 1967) is an American retired professional wrestler, better known by his ring name "the Black Nature Boy" Scoot Andrews.

After debuting in 1994, Andrew competed for numerous independent professional wrestling promotions throughout his career. Throughout the 1990s he competed in Southeastern independent promotions including Florida Championship Wrestling, Maryland Championship Wrestling, East Coast Wrestling Association, and the National Wrestling Alliance as one half of Naturally Marvellous with Mike Sullivan. He also had a short stint in the World Wrestling Federation during 2001 appearing several times on WWF Jakked, WWF Metal, and WWF Sunday Night Heat and again during 2003 and 2004 on WWE Raw and WWE SmackDown. During the early 2000s, he wrestled for Full Impact Pro and Ring of Honor. He continued to compete for independent promotions until his retirement in 2005.

== Professional wrestling career ==
After being trained by Hack Meyers and Damien Lee, Andrews made his professional wrestling debut on September 24, 1994 in a match against Damian Lee. Throughout the 1990s, Andrews competed for a multitude of professional wrestling promotions, including Florida Championship Wrestling (FCW), Maryland Championship Wrestling (MCW), East Coast Wrestling Association (ECWA), and the National Wrestling Alliance as one half of Naturally Marvellous with Mike Sullivan.

In early 2000, Andrews competed in the annual ECWA Super 8 Tournament defeating Trent Acid and Chad Collyer before losing to Christopher Daniels in the finals in Newport, Delaware on February 26 (he would again face Daniels at the APW King of the Indies Tournament losing to him in the semi-finals on December 30). He also appeared in Ted DiBiase's short lived WXO promotion that same year, appearing in several televised events, and was voted Florida's Wrestler of the Year. At the end of 2000 and beginning of 2001, he made numerous appearances for the World Wrestling Federation, now World Wrestling Entertainment (WWE), on WWF Jakked, losing to wrestlers including Essa Rios and Crash Holly. Shortly after his appearances on WWF Jakked, he returned to IPW, and on January 13, 2001, Andrews defeated Seijin Akki and Naphtali to win the IPW Light Heavyweight Championship, a title he held until May 19, when he lost it to Akki. He also won the promotions Television title before losing it to A.J. Styles on November 24, 2001.

He made further appearance for WWE at the start of 2002, competing on WWE Heat, where he and Michael Shane lost to Tommy Dreamer and Spike Dudley. As well as this, he appeared on Ring of Honor's first ever show, The Era of Honor Begins, on February 23, 2002, losing a singles match against Xavier. He continued competing in independent promotions throughout the rest of 2002, 2003, and 2004, occasionally wrestling in dark matches or on WWE Velocity for WWE. In 2004, he mainly competed for Full Impact Pro and NWA Florida, and on September 4, 2004, Andrews, being managed by SoCal Val, defeated Lex Lovett to win the Florida version of the NWA Southern Heavyweight Championship. He later dropped the Championship back to Lovett on October 9, 2004. At the start of 2005, Andrews was involved in a feud with The Heartbreak Express, consisting of Sean and Phil Davis, taking them on in tag team matches with a number of different opponents. He then moved into a quick feud with Antonio Banks, before announcing his retirement at a NWA Florida show on February 26, 2005.

He was inducted into the ECWA Hall of Fame in December 2005. In 2006, he made an appearance for Elite Wrestling Entertainment, managing D'Lo Brown in a loss to Mike Sullivan.

In 2009 he returned to wrestling and wrestled for more independent wrestling companies. He retired then again in 2022.

== Championships and accomplishments ==
- Caribbean Championship Wrestling
  - CCW Heavyweight Championship (1 time)
- Championship Wrestling from Florida
  - NWA Florida Heavyweight Championship (1 time)
  - NWA Florida Tag Team Championship (1 time) - with Mike Sullivan
  - NWA Southern Heavyweight Championship (Florida version) (1 time)
- Coastal Championship Wrestling
  - CCW Heavyweight Championship (1 time)
  - CCW Tag Team Championship (1 time) - with Jason Hexx
- East Coast Wrestling Association
  - ECWA Heavyweight Championship (1 time)
  - Hall of Fame (2005)
- Florida State Professional Wrestling Association
  - FSPWA Heavyweight Championship (1 time)
  - FSPWA Tag Team Championship (1 time) - with Hack Meyers
- Florida Wrestling Alliance
  - FWA Heavyweight Championship (1 time)
  - FWA Light Heavyweight Championship (1 time)
- Future of Wrestling
  - FOW Heavyweight Championship (1 time)
- Independent Professional Wrestling
  - IPW Heavyweight Championship (1 time)
  - IPW Light Heavyweight Championship (1 time)
- Insane Wrestling Alliance
  - IWA Tag Team Championship (1 time) - with Jason Hexx
- Maximum Pro Wrestling
  - MXPW Television Championship (1 time)
- Midwest Championship Wrestling
  - MCW Heavyweight Championship (1 time)
- Pro Wrestling Illustrated
  - PWI ranked him #114 of the 500 best singles wrestlers of the PWI 500 in 2002
- Renegade Championship Wrestling
  - RCW Heavyweight Championship (1 time)
  - RCW Television Championship (1 time)
  - RCW Tag Team Championship (1 time) - with Damian Lee
- Southern Championship Wrestling
  - SCW Mid-Atlantic Heavyweight Championship (1 time)
- Southeastern Championship Wrestling
  - SECW Heavyweight Championship (1 time)
- Thunder Wrestling Federation
  - TWF Television Championship (3 times)

== In popular culture ==
- Warner is one of several independent wrestlers referenced in the 2005 novel Backyard Empire: Inspired by a True Story by Alex Hutchinson.

== Media ==
- NWA Florida: Rage in the Cage Perf. Scoot Andrews. DVD. NWA Florida, 2004.
- Takedown Masters Perf. Scoot Andrews. DVD. Ring of Honor, 2004.
- Ring of Honor: The Era of Honor Begins Perf. Scoot Andrews. DVD. Ring of Honor, 2004.
- Best of IPW Hardcore Wrestling, Vol. 1 Perf. Scoot Andrews. DVD. IPW Wrestling, 2006.
