= ECWA Legacy Championship =

Professional wrestling championship

Details
- Promotion: East Coast Wrestling Association
- Date established: May 1, 1993
- Current champion: LA Vin
- Date won: November 5, 2022

Other names
- ECWA Mid-Atlantic Heavyweight Championship (May 1, 1993 – February 22, 1997); ECWA Television Championship (February 22, 1997 – November 29, 1997); ECWA Mid-Atlantic Heavyweight Championship (November 29, 1997 – January 18, 2020); ECWA Legacy Championship (January 18, 2020 – present)
Statistics
- First champion: Bootie Woogie Brown
- Most reigns: Chris Wylde (4 times)
- Longest reign: Bryan Logan (511 days)
- Shortest reign: "Greek God" Papadon (tied) (<1 day)

ECWA Legacy Championship is the secondary championship contested in the independent professional wrestling promotion, East Coast Wrestling Association.The current champion is Sam Shields, who is in his first reign.

== Title history ==
Key
No.	Overall reign number
Reign	Reign number for the specific champion
N/A	The information is not available or is unknown
+	Current reign is changing daily

No.	Champion	Championship change			Reign statistics		Notes	Ref.
No.	Champion	Date	Event	Location	Reign	Days	Notes	Ref.
1	Boogie Woogie Brown	May 1, 1993	ECWA	Wilmington, DE	1	6	Title history unrecorded prior to May 1, 1993.	
Title history unknown from May 1993 to December 1995.
2	Ronnie Roberts	December 3, 1995	ECWA	Wilmington, DE	1	29	Won a battle royal to win the vacant title.	
3	Boogie Woogie Brown	January 1996	ECWA	Unknown	2	305		
Title history unknown from January 1996 to February 1997.
4	Ace Darling	February 22, 1997	ECWA	Wilmington, DE	1	280	Darling defeated Cheetah Master to win the vacant title in a First Annual ECWA Super 8 Tournament final match.	
5	Reckless Youth	November 29, 1997	ECWA	Wilmington, DE	1	301	This was a Triple threat ladder match also involving Lance Diamond.	
6	The Inferno Kid	September 26, 1998	ECWA	Newark, DE	1	154		
7	Mr. Ooh La La	February 27, 1999	3rd Annual Super 8 Tournament	Newark, DE	1	153		
8	Cheetah Master	July 30, 1999	ECWA	Newport, DE	1	49	This was a Best Two Out Of Three Falls match.	
9	Lance Diamond	September 17, 1999	ECWA	Wilmington, DE	1	28		
10	Ty Street	October 15, 1999	4th Annual Super 8 Tournament	Newport, DE	1	—		
11	Glen Osbourne	2000	ECWA	Unknown	1	—		
12	Mozart Fontaine	April 7, 2001	ECWA	Wilmington, DE	1	525		
13	Mr. Ooh La La	April 6, 2002	ECWA	Wilmington, DE	2	161		
14	The Japanese Pool Boy	September 14, 2002	ECWA	Wilmington, DE	1	231		
15	Prince Nana	May 3, 2003	ECWA	Wilmington, DE	1	301		
16	Ace Darling	February 28, 2004	ECWA	Wilmington, DE	2	63		
17	Prince Nana	May 1, 2004	Night Of The Unusual Matches 2004	Wilmington, DE	2	137	This was a Lumberjack match.	
18	Fred Sampson	September 18, 2004	ECWA	Newark, DE	1	56		
19	Nick Malakai	November 13, 2004	ECWA	Newark, DE	1	91		
20	Chase Del Monte	February 12, 2005	ECWA	Newark, DE	1	350		
21	The Japanese Pool Boy	January 28, 2006	ECWA	Newark, DE	2	35	This was a triple threat match also involving Mike Tobin.	
22	Mike Tobin	March 4, 2006	ECWA	Newark, DE	1	217		
23	Bryan Logan	October 7, 2006	ECWA	Newark, DE	1	511		
—	Vacated	March 1, 2008	—	—	—	—	The championship was vacated by Bryan Logan.	
24	J.J. Cruz	March 1, 2008	ECWA	Newark, DE	1	35	Defeated Ace Darling after both men won separate Mid-Atlantic Riot matches.	
25	Ace Darling	April 5, 2008	ECWA	Newark, DE	3	35		
26	Glen Osbourne	May 10, 2008	ECWA	Newark, DE	2	77	This match was both for the ECWA Mid Atlantic Heavyweight Championship and for the ECWA Heavyweight Championship, at that match, Osbourne was the ECWA Heavyweight champion.	
—	Vacated	July 8, 2008	—	—	—	—	The championship was vacated.	
27	Chase Del Monte	July 26, 2008	ECWA	Newark, DE	2	0	Monte defeated Ace Darling, Aden Chambers and Robere Shields in a fatal four-way match to win the vacant title. the Title awarded by owner Freak Nastty.	
28	Dan Eckos	September 27, 2008	ECWA	Newark, DE	1	56	This was a five-way match also involving Billy Bax, Jason Leigh and JJ Cruz.	
29	Sean Royal	November 22, 2008	ECWA	Newark, DE	1	63		
30	Rob Eckos	January 24, 2009	ECWA	Newark, DE	1	175	Dan and Rob Eckos defeated Billy Bax and Sean Royal in a tag team match with the title on the line. Eckos pinned Royal to win the title.	
31	Nick Logan	July 18, 2009	ECWA	Newark, DE	1	245		
32	Aden Chambers	March 20, 2010	ECWA	Newark, DE	1	112	Aden Chambers won the ECWA Mid-Atlantic Title and Team WCWA (Julian Starr & Ryan Rush) won the ECWA Tag Team Title in a Six-man tag team match, over Nick Logan, The Logan Brothers (Bryan Logan & Matt Logan).	
33	Nick Logan	July 10, 2010	14th Annual Super 8 Tournament	Newark, DE	2	72	Nick Logan won the ECWA Mid-Atlantic Title and Matt & Bryan Logan won the ECWA Tag Team Title in a Six-man tag team match, with no disqualification and no count out over Aden Chambers, Tony Burma & Ryan Rush.	
—	Vacated	October 2, 2010	—	—	—	—	The championship was vacated.	
34	Chris Wylde	December 4, 2010	ECWA	Newark, DE	1	350	Wylde and Mozart Fontaine were the last two men in a Battle Royal for the title. Wylde made Mozart tap out to win the vacant title.	
35	Kekoa The Flyin Hawaiian	November 19, 2011	K-Cup Tag Team Tournament 2011	Newark, DE	1	168		
36	Papadon	May 5, 2012	Divide & Conquer	Newark, DE	1	<1	This match was both for the ECWA Mid Atlantic Heavyweight Championship and for the ECWA Heavyweight Championship, at that match, Papadon was the ECWA Heavyweight champion.	
37	Mike Tartaglia	May 5, 2012	ECWA	Newark, DE	1	27	Tartaglia, a co-owner of the ECWA, bought the championship from Papadon.	
38	Mr. Ooh La La	June 2, 2012	Raising The Bar	Newark, DE	3	182		
39	Ricky Martinez	December 1, 2012	ECWA	Newark, DE	1	371		
40	Chris Wylde	December 7, 2013	Toys For Tots II Title Vs. Career	Newark, DE	2	273	This was Title vs Career match.	
41	Mark Harro	September 6, 2014	47th Anniversary Show	Newark, DE	1	91	Harro defeated Wylde in a Dog Collar match with Kao Storm as the special guest referee.	
42	Chris Wylde	December 6, 2014	Toys For Tots III	Newark, DE	3	196	This was a triple threat match also involving Kao Storm.	
43	Napalm Bomb	June 20, 2015	Raising The Bar IV	Woodbury Heights, NJ	1	91		
44	Bobby Shields	September 19, 2015	48th Anniversary Show	Woodbury Heights, NJ	1	182	Solo defended the championship. This was a triple threat match also involving Sean Carr.	
45	Azrieal	March 19, 2016	Spring Battle V	Woodbury Heights, NJ	1	427		
—	Vacated	May 20, 2017	—	—	—	—	The championship was vacated.	
46	Breaker Morant	June 24, 2017	Fire And Ice	Springfield, PA	1	180	Morant defeated Howie Timbereche to win the vacant title.	
47	Chris Wylde	December 21, 2017	—	Woodbury Heights, New Jersey	4	149		
48	Joe Gacy	May 19, 2018	—	Atlantic City, New Jersey	1	147		
49	Joey Ace	October 13, 2018	Witching Hour	New Castle, Delaware	1	189	This was a Falls Count Anywhere match.	
—	Vacated	April 20, 2019	—	—	—	—	The championship was vacated due to Ace winning the ECWA Heavyweight Championship.	
50	Eric Martin	January 18, 2020	ECWA	New Castle, Delaware	1	441	Eric Martin defeated Napalm Bomb and Killian McMurphy in a three-way match to win the vacant title.	
51	Killian McMurphy	April 3, 2021	Night Of Unusual Matches 2021	Morganville, New Jersey	1	63		
52	Chris Rockwell	June 5, 2021	Heat Stroke	Morganville, New Jersey	1	154		
55	Sam Shields	November 6, 2021	Super Clash	Morganville, NJ	1	N/A		
—	Vacated	March 1, 2021	—	—	—	—	Sam Shields suffered an injury and had to vacate the title. A battle royal was held at the Super 8	
56	Travis Lee	March 26, 2021	ECWA 26th Annual Super 8 tournament	Morganville, NJ	1	35		
57	Erica Leigh	April 30, 2022	ECWA Night of Unusual Matches	Morganville, NJ	1	140	Becomes first female to win the title, as a result the Women's title is retired and all genders can challenge for all championships.	
—	Vacated	September 17, 2022	—	—	—	—	Erica vacated the title sometime during her reign.	
58	LA Vin	November 5, 2022	N/A	Morganville, NJ	1	1,260+	Captured the vacant championship in a match.	

== Combined reigns ==
As of April 18, 2026.

†	Indicates the current champion

Rank	Wrestler	No. of reigns	Combined days
1	Chris Wylde	4	968
2	Mozart Fontaine	1	525
3	Bryan Logan	1	511
4	Mr. Ooh La La	3	496
5	Eric Martin	1	441
6	Prince Nana	2	438
7	Azrieal	1	427
8	Chase Del Monte	2	413
9	Ace Darling	3	378
10	Ricky Martinez	1	371
11	Nick Logan	2	317
12	Boogie Woogie Brown	2	311
13	Reckless Youth	1	301
14	The Japanese Pool Boy	2	266
15	Mike Tobin	1	217
16	Joey Ace	1	189
17	Bobby Shields	1	182
18	Breaker Morant	1	180
19	Rob Eckos		175
20	LA Vin †	1	1,260+
21	Kekoa The Flyin Hawaiian	1	168
22	The Inferno Kid	1	154
23	Joe Gacy	1	147
24	Chris Rockwell	1	154
25	Erica Leigh	1	140
26	Aden Chambers	1	112
29	Mark Harro	1	91
29	Napalm Bomb	1	91
29	Nick Malakai	1	91
30	Glen Osbourne	2	77 –
31	Killian McMurphy	1	63
31	Sean Royal	1	63
34	Dan Eckos	1	56
34	Fred Sampson	1	56
35	Cheetah Master	1	49
36	Travis Lee	1	35
37	J.J. Cruz	1	35
38	Ronnie Roberts	1	29
39	Lance Diamond	1	28
40	Mike Tartaglia	1	27
41	Papadon	1	<1
42	Ty Street	1	–
43	Sam Shields	1	N/A
