= Ace Darling =

American professional wrestler (born 1974)

Personal information
- Born: Michael Maraldo; June 27, 1974 (age 52) Freehold, New Jersey, U.S. (Note: It is not currently known whether this is Freehold Township, New Jersey or Freehold Borough, New Jersey.)

Professional wrestling career
- Ring name(s): Ace Darling; Mike Maraldo; Doink
- Billed height: 6 ft 0 in (1.83 m)
- Billed weight: 220 lb (100 kg)– 240 lb (110 kg)
- Billed from: Jersey Shore
- Trained by: Mike Sharpe; Bobby Piper
- Debut: 1992

Michael Maraldo (born June 27, 1974) is an American professional wrestler, best known by his ring name Ace Darling. Darling has wrestled in various independent promotions in Pennsylvania, New Jersey, and Delaware, most notably for the East Coast Wrestling Association, Jersey All Pro Wrestling, World Wrestling Federation, World Championship Wrestling and Extreme Championship Wrestling.

== Championships and accomplishments ==
- Bloody Rage American Wrestling League
  - BRAWL American Heavyweight Championship (1 time)
- Century Wrestling Alliance
  - CWA Tag Team Championship (1 time) – with Devon Storm
- East Coast Pro Wrestling
  - ECPW Tag Team Championship (1 time) – with Devon Storm
- East Coast Wrestling Association
  - ECWA Heavyweight Championship (1 time)
  - ECWA Mid Atlantic Championship (4 times)
  - ECWA Tag Team Championship (3 times) – with Kid Flash (1), Devon Storm (1) and Matt Striker (1)
  - Super 8 Tournament (1997)
  - ECWA Hall of Fame (Class of 1996)
- Empire Wrestling Alliance
  - EWA Heavyweight Championship (1 time)
- Eternity Wrestling Association
  - EWA Tag Team Championship (1 time) – with Devon Storm
- Garden State Wrestling Alliance
  - GSWA Heavyweight Championship (1 time)
- Independent Superstars of Pro Wrestling
  - ISPW Heavyweight Championship (5 times)
- Jersey Championship Wrestling
  - JCW Championship (1 time)
  - JCW Television Championship (1 time)
  - JCW Tag Team Championships (1 time) – with Matt Striker
- National Wrestling Alliance
  - NWA North American Heavyweight Championship (1 time)
- NWA 2000
  - NWA 2000 Tag Team Championship (1 time) – with Devon Storm
- NWA New Jersey
  - NWA United States Tag Team Championship (New Jersey version) (1 time) – with Devon Storm
  - NWA World Light Heavyweight Championship (New Jersey version) (1 time)
- NWA New York
  - NWA New York Tag Team Championship (1 time) – with Devon Storm
  - NWA New York Television Championship (1 time)
- National Wrestling Superstars
  - NWS Tag Team Championship (2 times) – with Shane Taylor
- New Jack City Wrestling
  - NJCW Light Heavyweight Championship (2 times)
- Richmond Championship Wrestling
  - RCW Tag Team Championship (1 time) – with Devon Storm
- Pennsylvania Championship Wrestling
  - PCW America's Heavyweight Championship (2 times)
  - PCW Tag Team Championship (1 time) – with Mark Mest / Glen Osbourne^{1}
- Pro Wrestling Illustrated
  - PWI ranked him #125 of the 500 best singles wrestlers in the PWI 500 in 1997
- World Wide Wrestling Alliance
  - WWWA Light Heavyweight Championship (1 time)

^{1}After throwing Mest out of the team, Darling chose Glen Osbourne as a replacement without interrupting the championship reign.
