= ECWA Heavyweight Championship =

Professional wrestling championship

ECWA Unified Heavyweight Championship

Details
- Promotion: East Coast Wrestling Association
- Date established: August 1967
- Current champion: Travis Lee
- Date won: November 5, 2022

Other names
- ECWA Heavyweight Championship (1993–2012); ECWA Unified Heavyweight Championship (2012–present)
Statistics
- First champion: Lance Diamond
- Most reigns: Cheetah Master and Joey Ace (3 times)
- Longest reign: Lance Diamond (853 days)
- Shortest reign: Xavier (<1 day)

ECWA Heavyweight Championship is the top title contested in the independent professional wrestling promotion East Coast Wrestling Association. The current champion is Travis Lee, who is in his first reign.

== History ==
ECWA began as a backyard wrestling promotion in New Castle, DE started by Jim Kettner and a close friend of Kettner's at his home in 1967. In the early 1980s, the promotion ran under the banner of East Coast Wrestling Semi-Pro wrestling. Spot shows ran throughout New Castle County, Delaware during the 1980s. Shows were performed at venues such as Millcreek Fire Hall, Corpus Christi School, Thomas McKean High School, Claymont Fire Hall, Nur Temple, St. Matthews Parish Center, The Wilmington Boys and Girls Club, as well as various other "one time" stops.

Title history prior to 1993 was not recorded, however the first champion was Red Devil in 1967, confirmed by Jim Kettner.

== Reigns since 1993 ==
Key
No.	Overall reign number
Reign	Reign number for the specific champion
Days	Number of days held
+	Current reign is changing daily

No.	Champion	Championship change			Reign statistics		Notes	Ref.
No.	Champion	Date	Event	Location	Reign	Days	Notes	Ref.
1	Lance Diamond	May 1, 1993	ECWA	Wilmington, Delaware	1	853	Title history unrecorded prior to May 1, 1993.	
2	Cheetah Master	September 1, 1995	ECWA	Wilmington, Delaware	1	183		
3	Ace Darling	March 2, 1996	ECWA	Wilmington, Delaware	1	69		
4	Cheetah Master	May 10, 1996	ECWA	Wilmington, Delaware	2	197		
5	Lance Diamond	November 23, 1996	ECWA	Wilmington, Delaware	2	<1		
6	Glen Osbourne	November 23, 1996	ECWA	Wilmington, Delaware	1	119		
6	Viper	March 22, 1997	First Annual Super 8 Tournament	Wilmington, Delaware	1	483		
7	Christian Cage	July 18, 1998	ECWA	Newport, Delaware	1	454		
—	Vacated	October 15, 1999	—	—	—	—	Title is vacated when Cage left the promotion and signed with the World Wrestling Federation.	—
8	JJ The Ring Crew Guy	October 15, 1999	ECWA	Wilmington, Delaware	1	344	JJ the Ring Crew Guy defeated Ground Zero for the vacant title.	
9	The Inferno Kid	September 23, 2000	ECWA	Newport, Delaware	1	17		
10	JJ The Ring Crew Guy	October 14, 2000	ECWA	Laurel, Delaware	2	42		
11	Cheetah Master	November 25, 2000	Battle At The Bob	Newport, Delaware	3	133		
12	Kevin Kelly	April 7, 2001	ECWA	Newport, Delaware	1	28		
—	Vacated	May 5, 2001	—	—	—	—	Kevin Kelly was stripped from his championship.	—
13	Scoot Andrews	May 5, 2001	Sixth Annual Super 8 Tournament	Newport, Delaware	1	364	After Kevin Kelly is stripped of the title, ECWA Officials stripped Kevin order two six-way matches with the winners of each match to face each other for the title, with Scoot Andrews defeating Billy Fives in the finals.	
14	Prince Nana	May 4, 2002	ECWA	Newport, Delaware	1	133		
15	Red	September 14, 2002	ECWA	Wilmington, Delaware	1	49		
16	Xavier	November 2, 2002	ECWA	Wilmington, Delaware	1	<1		
17	The Amazing Red	November 2, 2002	ECWA	Wilmington, Delaware	2	77		
18	Christopher Daniels	January 18, 2003	ECWA	Wilmington, Delaware	1	294	Defeated Amazing Red in a five-way match including Mike Kruel, Low Ki, & American Dragon.	
19	Mike Kruel	November 8, 2003	ECWA	Wilmington, Delaware	1	147		
20	Christopher Daniels	April 3, 2004	ECWA	Newport, Delaware	2	28	Defeated Kruel in the semi-finals of the 2004 ECWA Super 8 Tournament.	
21	R. J. Brewer	May 1, 2004	Night Of The Unusual Matches 2004	Wilmington, Delaware	1	287	Defeated Daniels in a four-way elimination match with Mike Kruel and Austin Aries.	
22	Scotty Charisma	February 12, 2005	ECWA	Newark, Delaware	1	266	Defeated Walters in a four-way elimination match with Mike Kruel, Xavier and Andrew Ryker.	
23	Fred Sampson	November 5, 2005	ECWA	Bear, Delaware	1	84	Defeated Charisma in a three-way match with Vic D. Vine.	
24	Freak Nastty	January 28, 2006	ECWA	Newark, Delaware	1	413		
25	Aden Chambers	March 17, 2007	ECWA	Newark, Delaware	1	350	Defeated Nastty in a four-way match with Ace Darling and Frederick of Hollywood.	
26	Mr. Scott Wright	March 1, 2008	ECWA	Newark, Delaware	2	35		
27	Glen Osbourne	April 5, 2008	ECWA	Newark, Delaware	2	112		
28	Frederick of Hollywood	July 26, 2008	ECWA	Newark, Delaware	2	119	Formerly known as Bonecrusher Fred Sampson.	
29	Tommy Trouble	November 22, 2008	ECWA	Newark, Delaware	1	105		
—	Vacated	March 7, 2009	—	—	—	—	Championship was vacated due to unknown reasons.	—
30	Chase Del Monte	March 7, 2009	ECWA	Newark, Delaware	1	189	Defeated Billy Bax, Dan Eckos and Frederick Of Hollywood in a fatal-four-way match.	
31	Bazooka Joe	September 12, 2009	ECWA	Newark, Delaware	1	238		
32	Mega	May 8, 2010	ECWA	Newark, Delaware	1	133		
33	Andrew Ryker	September 18, 2010	A New Era Begins	Newark, Delaware	1	77		
—	Vacated	December 4, 2010	—	—	—	—	The championship was vacated due to Ryker injury and announced his retirement.	—
34	Mega	January 15, 2011	ECWA	Newark, Delaware	2	49	Defeated Glen Osbourne in a chain match for the vacant title.	
35	Papadon	March 5, 2011	ECWA	Newark, Delaware	1	560		
36	Chris Wylde	September 15, 2012	45th Anniversary Show	Newark, Delaware	1	112		
37	Josh Daniels	January 5, 2013	New Year Resolutions II	Newark, Delaware	1	126		
38	VSK	May 11, 2013	YMCA V	Carneys Point Township, New Jersey	1	63		
39	Papadon	July 13, 2013	Aden Chambers Farewell Show	Newark, Delaware	2	112		
40	Kekoa The Flyin Hawaiian	November 2, 2013	ECWA	Newark, Delaware	1	119		
—	Vacated	March 1, 2014	—	—	—	—	Championship was vacated due to unknown reasons.	—
41	Napalm Bomb	June 7, 2014	Raising The Bar III	Newark, Delaware	1	<1	Won vacated title in a fatal-four-way match, also involving Breaker Morant, Chris Wylde and Ricky Martinez.	
42	Bobby Shields	June 7, 2014	Raising The Bar III	Newark, Delaware	1	182	Cashed in his "Golden Opportunity Contract" and defeated Bomb.	
43	Ricky Martinez	December 6, 2014	Toys For Tots III	Woodbury Heights, NJ	1	105		
44	Matt Saigon	March 21, 2015	19th Annual Super 8 Tournament	Woodbury Heights, New Jersey	1	259	This was a triple threat match also involving Bobby Shields.	
45	Sean Carr	December 5, 2015	Toys For Tots IV	Woodbury Heights, New Jersey	1	463	This was an Iron Man match.	
46	Azrieal	March 12, 2017	Spring Battle	Woodbury Heights, New Jersey	1	188	This was a triple threat match also involving Chris Wylde.	
47	Bobby Shields	September 16, 2017	50th Anniversary Show	Woodbury Heights, New Jersey	2	35		
48	Azrieal	October 21, 2017	2017 Women's ChickFight Super 8 Tournament	Woodbury Heights, New Jersey	2	210		
49	Mike Law	May 19, 2018	Burbon Room at the Showboat Hotel	Atlantic City, New Jersey	1	196	This was a Triple threat match which also involves Ty Awesome	
50	Ty Awesome	December 1, 2018	Toys for Tots	New Castle, Delaware	1	140		
51	Joey Ace	April 20, 2019	23th Annual Super 8 Tournament	Philadelphia, Pennsylvania	1	231	This was a six-way match also involving Blk Jeez, Kekoa, Azrieal and Mike Law	
52	Sam Shields	December 7, 2019	Toys For Tots	New Castle, Delaware	1	287		
53	Joey Ace	September 19, 2020	2020 Super 8	Morganville, NJ	2	224		
54	Mr. Ooh La La	May 1, 2021	25th Annual Super 8 Tournament	Morganville, NJ	1	189		
55	Joey Ace	November 6, 2021	Super Clash	Morganville, NJ	3	198		
56	Sam Shields	May 23, 2022	Marvelous May	Morganville, NJ	2	117		
57	Erica Leigh	September 17, 2022	Pretzelmania V	Morganville NJ	1			
—	Vacated	April 7, 2001	—	—	—	—	The championship was vacated once more.	—
58	Travis Lee	November 5, 2022	55th Anniversary Show	Morganville, NJ	1	1,114+	Defeated Mr. Ooh La La in the tournament final for the vacant title.	

== Combined reigns ==
As of November 23, 2025.

†	Indicates the current champion

Rank	Wrestler	No. of reigns	Combined days
1	Lance Diamond	1	853
2	Papadon	2	672
3	Joey Ace	3	651
4	Cheetah Master	3	513
5	Viper	1	483
6	Sean Carr	1	463
7	Christian Cage	1	454
8	Freak Nastty	1	422
9	Sam Shields	2	404
10	Azrieal	2	398
11	JJ The Ring Crew Guy	2	386
12	Scoot Andrews	1	364
13	Aden Chambers	1	350
14	Christopher Daniels	2	322
15	Scotty Charisma/Mr. Scott Wright	2	301
16	John Walters	1	287
17	Matt Saigon	1	259
18	Bazooka Joe	1	238
19	Fred Sampson/Frederick of Hollywood	2	203
20	Mike Law	1	196
21	Chase Del Monte	1	189
21	Mr. Ooh La La	1	189
23	Bobby Shields	1	182
23	Mega	2	182
25	Mike Kruel	1	147
26	Ty Awesome	1	140
27	Glen Osbourne	1	140
28	Prince Nana	1	133
29	Josh Daniels	1	126
29	Red/Amazing Red	1	126
31	Kekoa The Flyin Hawaiian	1	119
32	Chris Wylde	1	112
33	Ricky Martinez	1	105
33	Tommy Trouble	1	105
35	Andrew Ryker	1	77
36	Ace Darling	1	69
37	VSK	1	63
38	Kevin Kelly	1	28
39	The Inferno Kid	1	17
40	Travis Lee †	1	1,114+
41	Napalm Bomb	1	<1
41	Xavier	1	<1
