= Joel Goodhart =

American businessperson (b. 1953)

- Born: August 28, 1953 (age 72); Philadelphia, Pennsylvania, U.S.
- Occupations: Businessman, booker, professional wrestler

Joel Goodhart (born August 28, 1953) is an American booker, and wrestling promoter in the Philadelphia areas. He founded Tri-State Wrestling Alliance in Philadelphia in 1989 and eventually became Extreme Championship Wrestling in 1992.

In 1989 under the banner Tri-State Wrestling Alliance (TWA) owned by Joel Goodhart. In 1992, Goodhart sold his share of the company to his partner, Tod Gordon, who created his own promotion from TWA's remnants, Eastern Championship Wrestling (ECW).

On September 28, 2024, Goodheart announced he would be holding a Tri-State reunion show at the 2300 Arena the following summer. Tri-State's "One and Done" was held on May 3, 2025, with the main event featuring Breaker Morant defeating Chris Wylde in a South Philly Street Fight match for the TWA Heavyweight Championship.

== Personal life ==
Goodhart released a book co-authored with Scott Teal in April 2025, We Wrestled, We Brawled, We Started It All.

== Championships and accomplishments ==
- Cauliflower Alley Club
  - Courage Award (2025)
- East Coast Wrestling Association
  - ECWA Hall of Fame (class of 2022)
