= Simon Diamond =

American professional wrestler (born 1968)

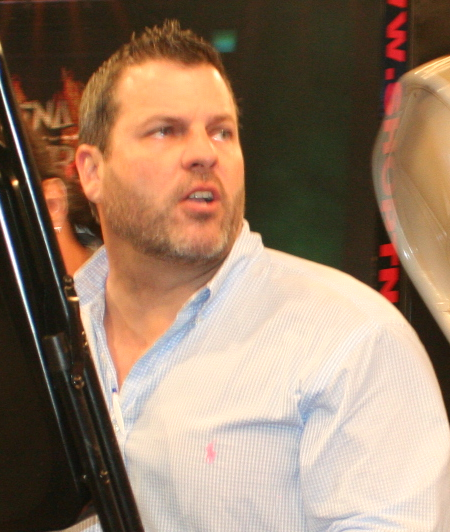
- Diamond in 2010

Personal information
- Born: Patrick Joseph Michael Kenney; May 26, 1968 (age 58) Wilmington, Delaware, U.S.
- Education: Virginia Commonwealth University
- Spouse: Candice Kenney
- Children: 2

Professional wrestling career
- Ring name(s): Lance Diamond; Simon Diamond; Pat Kenney
- Billed height: 6 ft 1 in (1.85 m)
- Billed weight: 225 lb (102 kg)
- Billed from: South Bend, Indiana
- Trained by: Jim Kettner
- Debut: 1991
- Retired: 2006

Patrick Joseph Michael Kenney (born May 26, 1968) is an American retired professional wrestler and baseball player, better known by his ring name, Simon Diamond. He is working for the National Wrestling Alliance as Director of Talent Relations. Diamond is best known for his appearances with Extreme Championship Wrestling from 1998 to 2001.

== Early life ==
Kenney attended the Salesianum School for Boys in Wilmington, Delaware, graduating in 1986. An avid baseball player as a teenager, he was approached by the San Diego Padres to play Major League Baseball as a catcher in 1986. Kenney decided not to sign the contract he was offered, opting to pursue a college education first. Kenney took a job at the Out Of Bounds sports bar as a bartender and attended Virginia Commonwealth University on a baseball scholarship, earning a bachelor's degree in English. He originally planned to play baseball professionally after graduating, but was forced to reconsider after suffering a severe shoulder injury. Kenney's prior baseball career would later be used as an angle when he would visit the training camp of the 2005 world champions, the Chicago White Sox.

== Professional wrestling career ==
=== Early career (1991–1998) ===
In 1991, while working as a marketing executive for PepsiCo, Kenney was introduced to wrestling trainer Jim Kettner. Kenney decided to become a professional wrestler, and was trained by Kettner in Salem, New Jersey. Once his training was complete, he worked for Kettner's East Coast Wrestling Association as "Lance Diamond", teaming with Steve Corino.

=== Extreme Championship Wrestling (1998–2001) ===
In May 1998, Kenney was hired by Extreme Championship Wrestling (ECW), and wrestled his first match against Nova in York, Pennsylvania. In August 1998, he changed his name to "Simon Diamond", taking the name "Simon" from the real surname of his mentor, Dean Malenko. Kenney was paired with Swinger in May 2000 during an ECW World Tag Team Championship tournament and the two later formed a tag team which would endure for five more years.

Diamond and Swinger joined forces with C. W. Anderson in mid-2000, and began to ascend the ranks of the promotion.

=== Independent circuit (2001–2003) ===
The impending bankruptcy of ECW in 2001 forced Diamond to seek employment elsewhere, and he began negotiations with World Championship Wrestling (WCW) employee John Laurinaitis, which fell through when WCW was purchased by the World Wrestling Federation in March 2001.

Diamond worked for various independent promotions, including USA Professional Wrestling, Border City Wrestling and World Wrestling All-Stars. In Major League Wrestling, he formed The Extreme Horsemen with his two former allies Steve Corino and C. W. Anderson. Justin Credible was also a member, and J. J. Dillon briefly managed them before MLW folded.

=== Total Nonstop Action Wrestling and Impact Wrestling (2003–2017) ===
On July 9, 2003, Kenney and Swinger appeared on a Total Nonstop Action Wrestling (TNA) pay-per-view, beginning a feud with America's Most Wanted (Chris Harris and James Storm). Enlisting the services of manager Glenn Gilbertti, the duo won the NWA World Tag Team Championships on August 27, 2003, and held the titles until November 19, when the titles were held up following a controversial ending to a match with the 3 Live Kru.

Kenney and Swinger separated in 2004 and engaged in a feud, which saw Kenney turn face and embrace his Irish heritage, wrestling as "Irish" Pat Kenney. After being briefly renamed The Empire Saint, Kenney was not booked by TNA for several months, during which time he spent three weeks competing in Japan with the Zero-1 promotion.

Kenney returned to TNA on June 19, 2005, at Slammiversary as the heel Simon Diamond once more. At Slammiversary, Kenney teamed with Trytan (whom he referred to as his "insurance policy") to defeat Sonny Siaki and Apolo. The next month, Trytan was gone, and at No Surrender 2005 Diamond presented David Young, suggesting that, in Young, he had found "a diamond in the rough". Elix Skipper joined with Diamond and Young at Sacrifice on August 14.

In September 2005, Kenney spent two weeks in India, where he and fellow TNA employees Sonjay Dutt and Shark Boy visited several cities, promoting the debut of Impact! on ESPN Star Sports. On September 28 in Bhopal, a riot broke out when 1,000 fans were excluded from an event after attendance exceeded expectations. None of the three TNA wrestlers were injured.

Kenney returned to America in October 2005, and on December 8 started an angle with Chicago White Sox catcher A. J. Pierzynski. At Turning Point the Diamonds in the Rough (Diamond, Young and Skipper) were defeated in a six-man tag team match by Chris Sabin, Sonjay Dutt and Dale Torborg, who had Pierzynski in their corner. Pierzynszki returned to TNA in March 2006 and was once again confronted by Diamond, who ended up getting hit with a chair by the White Sox Manager Ozzie Guillen. Shortly thereafter Kenney became a road agent for TNA.

On November 3, 2008, Kenney was released from his contract with TNA, with them citing budgetary cuts as the reason.

On September 18, 2009, TNA Wrestling announced that Kenney had been rehired as a road agent to replace the fired Jim Cornette and B.G. James.

Kenney returned to television on the July 15, 2010, edition of Impact!, aligning himself with fellow ECW alumni Tommy Dreamer, Raven, Stevie Richards, Rhino, Brother Devon, Al Snow and Mick Foley in their invasion of TNA. The following week, TNA president Dixie Carter agreed to give the ECW alumni their own reunion pay–per–view event, Hardcore Justice: The Last Stand, as a celebration of hardcore wrestling and a final farewell to the company. At the event Kenney returned to his Simon Diamond persona and teamed with Johnny Swinger and Kid Kash in a six-man tag team match, where they were defeated by Little Guido, Tony Luke and Tracy Smothers of The Full Blooded Italians.

At May 8, 2012, Kenny substituted Taz as Color Commentator at TNA Xplosion, joining Jeremy Borash.

On June 19, 2017, Kenney left Impact Wrestling alongside Shane Helms and Al Snow.

=== National Wrestling Alliance (2017–present) ===
Kenney was seen on the NWA 73rd Anniversary Show Pay Per View during the Nick Aldis vs Trevor Murdoch match breaking up outside ring activity.

== Other media ==
Diamond appeared as a playable character in the 2000 video game ECW Hardcore Revolution.

== Personal life ==
Kenney began dating Dawn Marie in October 1998. Before dating, the two had been good friends for almost two years. They had planned to be married by the end of 2000 or into 2001. They did not wed, but stayed engaged for several years afterwards. After seven years together, their relationship began to come to an end. Kenney and Candice Kenney have a child born in 2010.

In 2009, Kenney filed a sexual abuse lawsuit against a former priest at Salesianum School.

== Championships and accomplishments ==
- East Coast Wrestling Association
  - ECWA Heavyweight Championship (1 time)
  - ECWA Mid-Atlantic Championship (1 time)
  - ECWA Tag Team Championship (3 times) — with Cheetah Master (1 time) and Steve Corino (1 time)
  - ECWA Hall of Fame (Class of 1995)
  - Super 8 Tournament (1998)
- Independent Professional Wrestling Alliance
  - IPWA Heavyweight Championship (1 time)
- Independent Wrestling Federation (New Jersey)
  - IWF Heavyweight Championship (1 time)
  - IWF Tournament Of Champions (2000)
- Jersey Championship Wrestling
  - JCW Championship (1 time)
  - JCW Television Championship (2 times)
- Major League Wrestling
  - MLW Global Tag Team Championship (1 time) — with C. W. Anderson
  - MLW Global Tag Team Championship Tournament (2002) - with C. W. Anderson
- Maximum Pro Wrestling
  - MPW Heavyweight Championship (1 time)
  - MPW Tag Team Championship (1 time) — with Johnny Swinger
- National Wrestling Alliance
  - NWA North American Heavyweight Championship (1 time)
  - NWA United States Tag Team Championship (1 time) — with Steve Corino
- NWA 2000
  - NWA 2000 Heavyweight Championship (1 time)
- NWA Total Nonstop Action
  - NWA World Tag Team Championship (1 time) — with Johnny Swinger
- Pennsylvania Championship Wrestling
  - PCW Heavyweight Championship (1 time)
  - PCW Tag Team Championship (1 time) — with Reckless Youth
  - PCW United States Championship (3 times)
- Pro-Pain Pro Wrestling
  - 3PW Tag Team Championship (1 time) — with Mike Kruel
- USA Pro Wrestling
  - USA Pro Tag Team Championship (2 times) — with Matt Striker

== See also ==
- Diamonds in the Rough (professional wrestling)
- Simon and Swinger
- The Xtreme Horsemen
