= Prince Nana =

American professional wrestler and manager (born 1979)

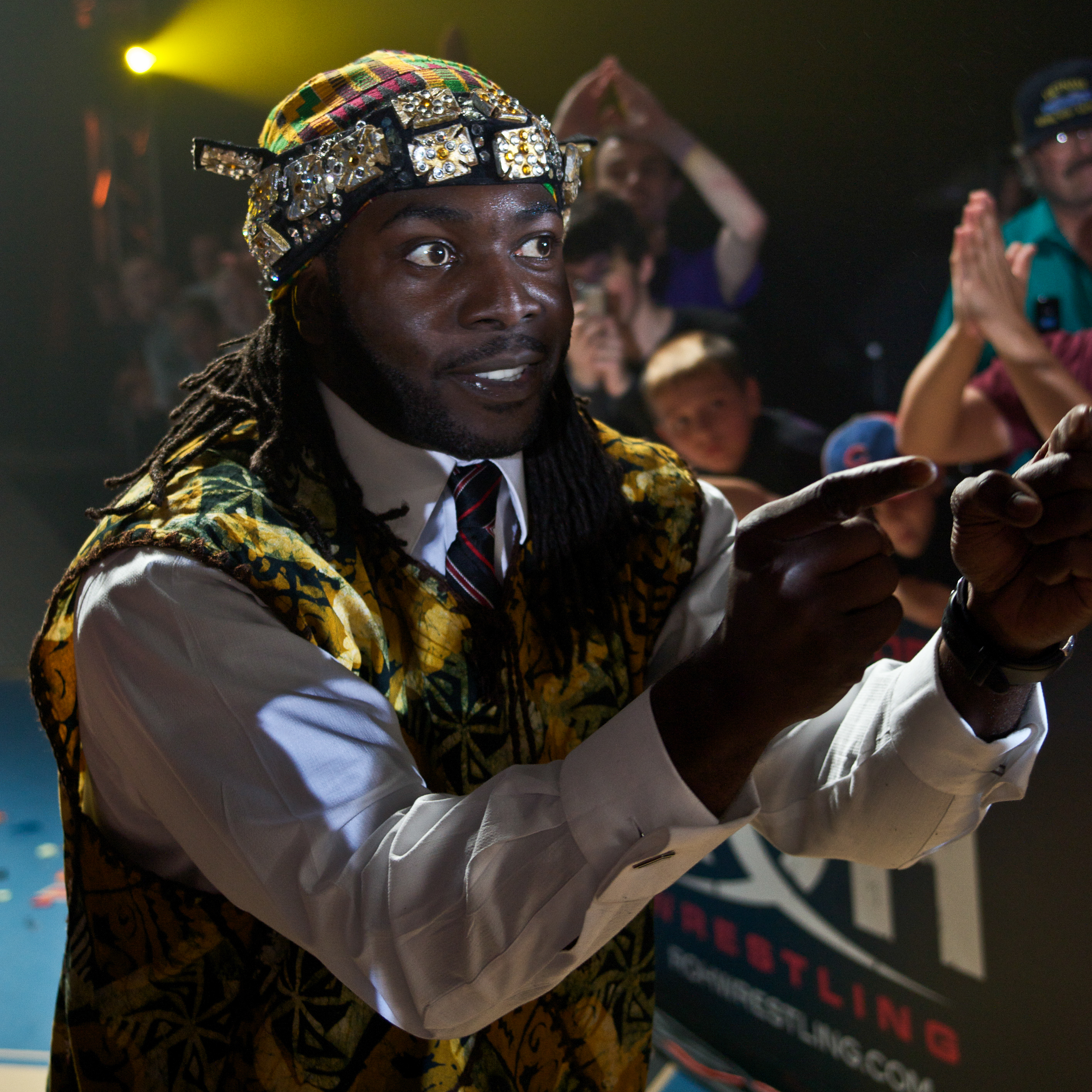
- Nana at a Ring of Honor show in 2011

Personal information
- Born: Nana Osei Bandoh; August 1, 1979 (age 47) Brooklyn, New York, U.S.

Professional wrestling career
- Ring name(s): Nana; Prince Nana
- Billed height: 5 ft 11 in (180 cm)
- Billed weight: 235 lb (107 kg)
- Billed from: "Ghana, West Africa"
- Trained by: Angel Medina; Vito LoGrasso; D-Von Dudley; Johnny Rodz; Mr. Fabian Street
- Debut: 1996

Nana Osei Ankrah Bandoh (born August 1, 1979), better known as Prince Nana, is a Ghanaian-American professional wrestling manager and former wrestler. He is signed to All Elite Wrestling (AEW), where he serves as the on-screen manager of Swerve Strickland and The New Level (Kofi and Austin Creed). He is also known for his tenure in Ring of Honor (ROH), where he was the founder and on-screen manager of The Embassy.

== Early life ==
Although Nana was born in the United States, he claims that he is the son of an Ashanti tribe member with royal heritage and the heir to the throne of Ashanti in Ghana. When Nana was three, his family relocated to Ghana for five years, returning so that Nana could be educated in America. As a teenager, he relocated to New York City in America as an exchange student.

In 1992, at the age of twelve, Nana watched WrestleMania VIII, and was inspired by the WWF Championship match between "Macho Man" Randy Savage and Ric Flair to become a wrestler. A year later, he wrote to the World Wrestling Federation (WWF; renamed WWE in 2002) and asked their advice as to which professional wrestling school he should attend. The WWF recommended that he train under Larry Sharpe in New Jersey, but Nana felt that Sharpe's school was too far away. Instead, Nana became a photographer for Johnny Rodz, who operated Gleason's Gym in New York. Nana worked for Rodz until he turned eighteen, when Rodz began training him as a wrestler.

== Professional wrestling career ==
=== Early career (1996–2002) ===
Nana debuted in 1996, wrestling in a church in Spanish Harlem.

Nana worked regularly for the East Coast Wrestling Association in Delaware and USA Pro Wrestling in New York, as well as making appearances with the WWF and with Pro Wrestling ZERO1-MAX in Japan.

=== Ring of Honor (2002–2016) ===
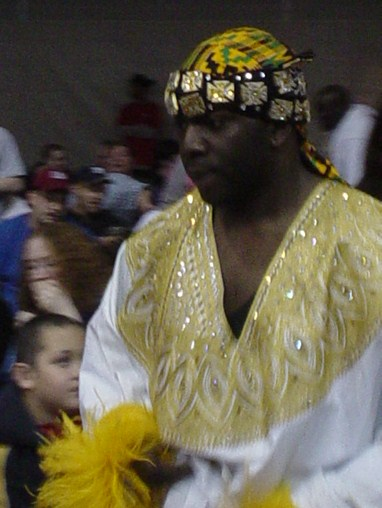
Nana in 2005

In 2002, Nana joined the upstart Ring of Honor promotion, where in 2004 he formed a heel stable known as The Embassy. In storylines, Nana used his wealth gained from the taxes of people of Ghana to hire wrestlers to wrestle his opponents and rivals. Under his management, John Walters defended his ROH Pure Championship and Jimmy Rave, Alex Shelley and Abyss won the Trios Tournament in 2006. He remained with Ring of Honor until September 2006, when he gave his notice.

On October 24, 2008, in Danbury, Connecticut, Nana made a surprise return to Ring of Honor, saying he had no more riches or crown and just wanted a job, before he was dragged away by security. The next night, Nana made an appearance at Ring of Honor's Edison, New Jersey show where he was removed in the same fashion. The next time ROH was in Edison on January 17, 2009, Nana again appeared, only to be dragged away by security. He would then be featured in segments on the ROH Video Wire. In a March edition of the Video Wire, Nana revealed that he had regained his riches due to President Obama's stimulus package, and had been directing Bison Smith's attacks on ROH wrestlers. On March 20, at the ROH show in Elizabeth, Pennsylvania, Nana declared that he had officially reformed the Embassy, with himself, Bison Smith and Ernie Osiris. The next day in New York City they were joined by the returning Jimmy Rave. Other members of the stable came to include Claudio Castagnoli, Joey Ryan, Erick Stevens, Shawn Daivari and Necro Butcher, but by October 2010 all of them, except Osiris, had left the group. On January 22, 2011, Nana debuted the latest version of the Embassy, consisting of Ernesto Osiris, Mia Yim, R.D. Evans, and Tommaso Ciampa, who would take over Jimmy Rave's former role as Nana's number one wrestler. The following April and June, both Dave Taylor and Rhino made appearances representing the Embassy. On the July 28, 2012 episode of Ring of Honor Wrestling, The Embassy disbanded, when Ciampa turned on Nana, after R.D. Evans had revealed his deal with Truth Martini, which had cost Ciampa the ROH World Television Championship.

On Monday, June 3, 2013, Nana received a tryout with WWE. Nana commented on the tryout on Facebook, writing, "Great day with the WWE...The future may be bright....Fools."

In mid-2013, Nana was given the new on-screen role of ROH Talent Scout. In late 2014, Nana formed yet another version of the Embassy with Moose, Stokely Hathaway and Veda Scott, which was later disbanded.

Nana was the manager of Donovan Dijak, after he sent him some envelopes every time he wrestled, until he finally departed from The House of Truth that took place on February 25, 2016 episode of ROH tapings.

=== Independent circuit (2016–2021) ===
Following his departure from ROH, Nana made only sporadic appearances over the next several years. In 2019, he returned to regular independent wrestling competition, appearing for promotions including Pro Wrestling Empire, Pro Wrestling Magic, and the Renegade Championship Wrestling promotion. He also reunited with former Embassy member Jimmy Rave and Sal Rinauro to form a new version of The Embassy. The trio competed in the King of Trios tournament at Chikara in October 2019, where they were defeated by FIST in the first round. His in-ring activity remained limited during 2020 and 2021.

=== All Elite Wrestling / Return to ROH (2022–present) ===
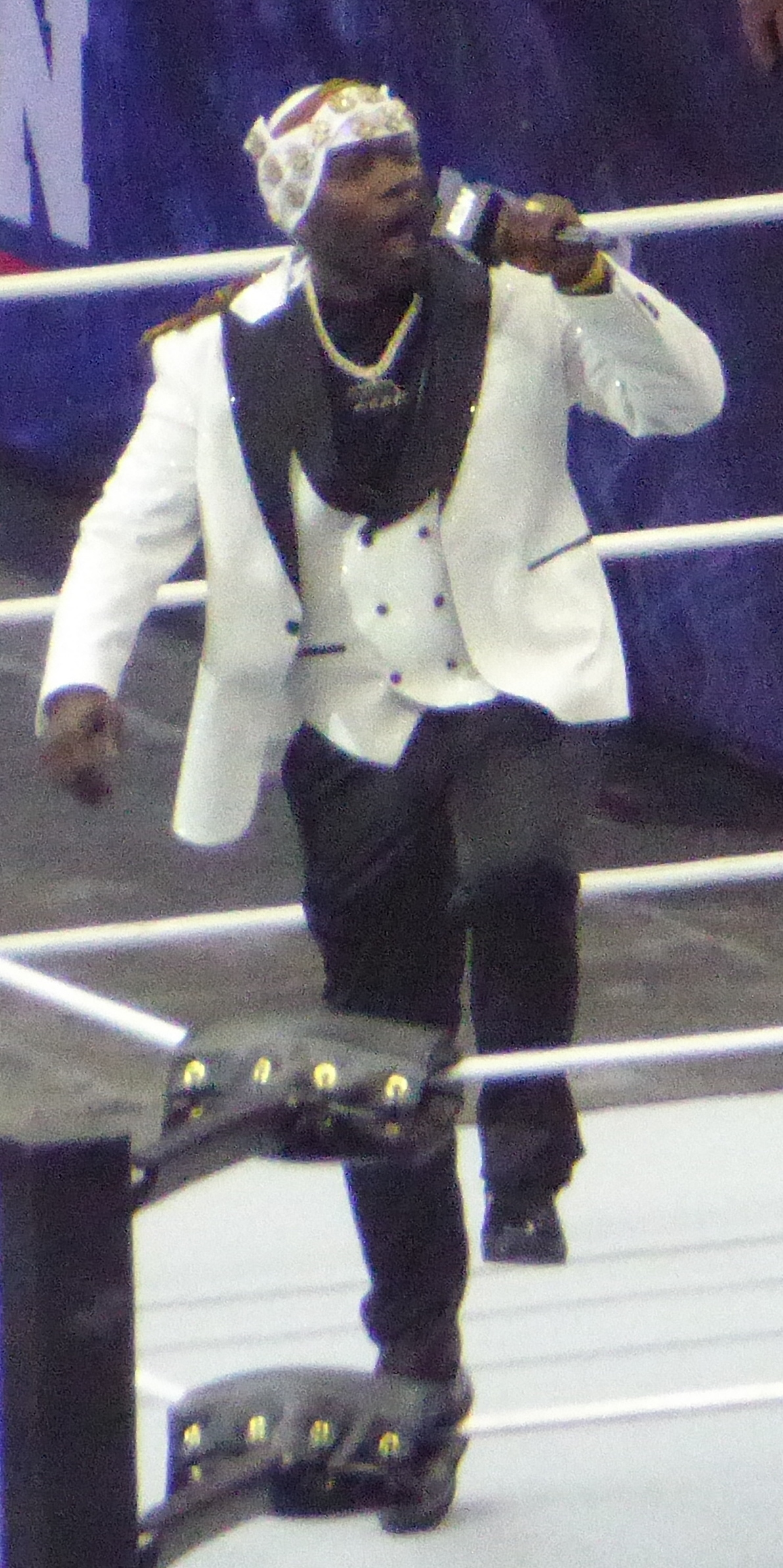
Nana at All In in August 2024

On July 23, 2022, at Death Before Dishonor, Prince Nana returned to ROH, purchased Tully Blanchard Enterprises, and reformed The Embassy with Brian Cage, Bishop Kaun, and Toa Liona, who later won the ROH World Six-Man Tag Team Championship at Final Battle in December, marking the first time a client of Nana's had won a championship. In April 2023, Nana began managing Swerve Strickland in ROH's sister promotion All Elite Wrestling (AEW), after Strickland announced he was merging his 'Mogul Affiliates' stable with The Embassy into the Mogul Embassy. A year later, Strickland won the AEW World Championship under Nana's managership, marking the first time a member of the Embassy had won any sort of singles championship. The Mogul Embassy later dissolved when Cage, Kaun, and Liona attacked Strickland and formed Cage of Agony, but Nana continued managing Strickland without the Embassy banner. In August 2026, Nana began managing the debuting New Level (Kofi and Austin Creed) alongside Strickland as the trio would win the AEW World Trios Championship.

== Other media ==
In 2020, Nana began hosting The Prince Nana Show, a podcast featuring interviews with professional wrestlers and other figures from the wrestling industry.

== Championships and accomplishments ==
- CyberSpace Wrestling Federation
  - CSWF Tag Team Championship (1 time) – with Sonjay Dutt
- East Coast Wrestling Association
  - ECWA Heavyweight Championship (1 time)
  - ECWA Mid Atlantic Championship (2 times)
- New York Wrestling Connection
  - NYWC Tag Team Championship (1 time) – with MEGA
- Pro Wrestling Illustrated
  - PWI ranked him #311 of the top 500 singles wrestlers in the PWI 500 in 2010
- USA Pro Wrestling
  - USA Pro New York State Championship (2 times)
- WrestlePurists
  - Best Non-Wrestler Award 2023
