= East Coast Wrestling Association =

American professional wrestling promotion

- Acronym: ECWA
- Founded: 1967
- Style: Professional wrestling
- Headquarters: Newark, Delaware
- Founder: Jim Kettner
- Owner: Joe Zanolle
- Website: ECWAprowrestling.com

East Coast Wrestling Association (ECWA) is an American professional wrestling promotion, founded in 1967 by promoter Jim Kettner. It is home to the annual Super 8 Tournament, one of the longest-running independent wrestling tournaments in the country, as well as the annual ECWA Women's Super 8 Tournament. In 2010, Kettner announced his retirement and turned the promotion over to Mike Tartaglia and Joe Zanolle. Mike Tartaglia officially put the company on hiatus on June 5, 2019. In December 2019, Tartaglia sold the promotion to Zanolle.

== Championships ==
=== Current Champions ===
Championship	Current champion(s)	Reign	Date won	Days held	Location	Event	Previous champion(s)
ECWA Heavyweight Championship	LA Vin	1	March 22, 2025	599+	Morganville, NJ	29th Annual Super 8 Tournament	Darius Carter
ECWA Tag Team Championship	Joey Ace & Cheyenne Ortiz	1	November 8th, 2025	368+	Morganville, New Jersey	ECWA Night Of Unusual Matches 2025	The Backyarders (Abs Armstrong & Raw Dog Travis Lee)
ECWA Legacy Championship	Se Morrigan	1	November 8th, 2025	368+	Morganville, NJ	ECWA Night Of Unusual Matches November 8th, 2025	Leo Sparrow
ECWA Territory Championship	Se Morrigan	1	April 27, 2025	563+	Morganville, New Jersey	ECWA Pretzlemania	Abs Armstrong

=== ECWA Super 8 ===
Type Of Super 8	Current Super 8 Winner(s)	Date Won	Location	Event	Previous Super 8 Winner(s)
ECWA Super 8 Tournament	Leo Sparrow	March 22, 2025	Morganville, New Jersey	ECWA 29th Annual Super 8 Tournament 2025	Darius Carter
ECWA Tag Team Super 8 Tournament	The Mane Event (Midas Black & Jay Lyon)	September 17, 2022	Morganville, New Jersey	ECWA Tag Team Super 8 Tournament 2022	N/A
ECWA Women's Super 8 Tournament	Erica Leigh	August 8, 2022	Paulsboro, New Jersey	7th Annual Women's Super 8 Tournament 2022	Megan Bayne

=== Yearly Special Holiday Matches ===
Match	Current Winner	Times Won	Date won	Location	Event	Award	Previous Winner
Turkey Bowl	LA Vin	1	November 27, 2025 (Thanksgiving)	Morganville, NJ	2025 14th Annual Turkey Bowl (Thanksgiving Special)	Turkey Bowl Championship	Jay D Luscious
8 Circles of Hell	The Backyarders (3) (Abs Armstrong and Travis Lee), King Reggie (3), and Mr. Ooh La La	1	October 31, 2025 (Halloween)	Morganville, New Jersey	2025 Annual 8 Circles of Hell	N/A	The Backyarders (2) (Abs Armstrong, Travis Lee, & Clutch Rockwell) & King Reggie (2)
Love Triangle	Abs Armastrong	1	February 14, 2024 (Valentines Day)	Travis Lee's Backyard	2024 Love Triangle Match	A full pair of Cupid Wings and a diaper to wear	N/A

=== Retired championships ===
Championship	Last champion(s)	Reign	Date won	Days held	Defenses	Location	Event	Previous champion(s)	Notes
ECWA Women's Championship	Gabby Ortiz	2	July 31, 2021	273	0	New Castle, Delaware	ECWA Super 8 Chickfight Tournament 2021	Vacant	During this reign the title was deactivated making Gabby Ortiz the final champion.

== ECWA Hall of Fame ==
Established in 1982, the East Coast Wrestling Association (ECWA) Hall of Fame honors performers and staff members alike for their contributions to the organization. Though there is no physical location for the Hall of Fame, the organization acknowledges all inductees on its website.

Inductees

ECWA Hall of Fame Inductees

#	Year	Ring name (Birth name) (Note: Entries without a birth name indicates that the inductee did not perform under a ring name.)	Notes (Note: This section mainly lists the major accomplishments of each inductee in ECWA.)
1	1982	Red Devil	First ECWA Champion
2	1982	Jim Kettner	Founder of the ECWA
3	1982	Super Smenkowski	
4	1982	Tiny Tom	
5	1982	Captain Tom	Managing
6	1982	George Koukedis	Announcing
7	1982	Mike Schroeder	
8	1983	Big Bill Page	
9	1983	The Maniac	
10	1983	Mr. Funk	
11	1984	Mad Dog Celli	
12	1984	Barry Page	
13	1985	The Baron	Managing
14	1985	Dirty Dirk Dunlap	Managing
15	1985	Ruffhouse Rivera (George Rivera)	
16	1985	The Bulldog	
17	1985	Sweet Chocolate Thunder	
18	1985	Jim Russum	
19	1986	The Wild Sheik	
20	1987	Mike Clark	Announcing
21	1988	Lord Vito Leone	Managing
22	1992	The Viper	Won the ECWA Heavyweight Championship (1 time) and ECWA Tag Team Championship (1 time)
23	1992	The Commando (Mark Miller)	
24	1992	The Commanding Officer	
25	1992	Dazzling Donny Love	
26	1992	Billy K	Announcing
27	1994	Dr. Destruction	
28	1994	Nigel Fair Service (George Rivera)	
29	1994	Thunder (Carl Fisher)	
30	1994	Boogie Woogie Brown (Delance Clifford Wright)	Won the ECWA Mid Atlantic Championship (2 times) and ECWA Tag Team Championship (1 time)
31	1995	Simon Diamond (Patrick Kenney)	Won the ECWA Heavyweight Championship (1 time), ECWA Mid Atlantic Championship (1 time), ECWA Tag Team Championship (2 times), and ECWA Super 8 Tournament (1998)
32	1995	Cheetah Master (Mike Womer)	Won the ECWA Heavyweight Championship (3 times), ECWA Mid Atlantic Championship (1 time), and ECWA Tag Team Championship (1 time)
33	1996	Ace Darling (Michael Maraldo)	Won the ECWA Heavyweight Championship (1 time), ECWA Mid Atlantic Championship (4 times), and ECWA Tag Team Championship (3 times)
34	1996	Inferno	Won the ECWA Heavyweight Championship (1 times) and ECWA Mid Atlantic Championship (1 time)
35	1996	Ravishing Ronny Roberts (Chuck Jones)	Won the ECWA Mid Atlantic Championship (1 time)
36	1996	Glen Osbourne	Won the ECWA Heavyweight Championship (2 times) and ECWA Mid Atlantic Championship (2 times)
37	1996	Mr. Ooh La La (Mike Houghton)	Won the ECWA Mid Atlantic Championship (2 times)
38	1996	Big Al Napier	Announcing
39	1996	Bob Densmore	Refereeing
40	1996	Richard Naegele	ECWA Commissioner
41	2000	Jeff Peterson	Super 8 competitor
42	2001	Christopher Daniels (Daniel Covell)	Won the ECWA Heavyweight Championship (2 times) and ECWA Super 8 Tournament (2000, 2004)
43	2001	Crowbar (Chris Ford)	Won the ECWA Tag Team Championship (1 time)
44	2001	Reckless Youth (Tom Carter)	Won the ECWA Mid Atlantic Championship (1 time)
45	2002	E.S. Easton	Managing
46	2002	Kevin Kelly (Kevin Foote)	Won the ECWA Heavyweight Championship (1 time)
47	2004	Charlie Haas	Won the ECWA Tag Team Championship (1 time)
48	2004	Russ Haas	Won the ECWA Tag Team Championship (1 time)
49	2004	Billy Kidman	Won the ECWA Tag Team Championship (1 time)
50	2005	Scoot Andrews (Andrew Warner)	Won the ECWA Heavyweight Championship (1 time)
51	2005	Chuck Ristano	Announcing
52	2005	Paul Turner	Refereeing
53	2006	Billy Bax (George Baxter)	Won the ECWA Tag Team Championship (1 time)
54	2006	Rob Eckos (Rob Strauss)	Won the ECWA Mid Atlantic Championship (1 time) and ECWA Tag Team Championship (2 times)
55	2006	Mozart Fontaine (Rufus Roush)	Won the ECWA Mid Atlantic Championship (1 time)
56	2006	Pete Theophall	Contributing artist
57	2006	Joe Zanolle	Photographer
58	2007	Low Ki (Brandon Silvestry)	Won the ECWA Tag Team Championship (2 times), ECWA Super 8 Tournament (2001)
59	2007	Sebastian Night	Managing
60	2007	The Iron Man (Charles Hiltner Jr.)	Wrestler
61	2007	Gary McLaughlin	ECWA floor director
62	2009	JJ the Crew Guy (John Gregory Johnson)	Won the ECWA Heavyweight Championship (2 times) and ECWA Tag Team Championship (1 time)
63	2009	Mega	Won the ECWA Heavyweight Championship (2 times) and ECWA Tag Team Championship (1 time)
64	2011	Michael Tartaglia	Won the ECWA Mid Atlantic Championship (1 time)
66	2012	"Greek God" Papadon	Won the ECWA Heavyweight Championship (3 times), ECWA Mid Atlantic Championship (1 time)
67	2013	Aden Chambers (Scott Beach)	Won the ECWA Heavyweight Championship (1 time), ECWA Mid Atlantic Championship (1 time), and ECWA Tag Team Championship (2 times)
68	2021	John Finegan	ECWA Lead official
69	2022	Joel Goodhart	East Coast radio host, promoter and founder of TWA, ECWA manager
70	2022	Coach Jim Shorts	Manager, and commentator for ECWA
71	2022	Bob Artese	ECWA Ring Announcer
72	2022	Steve Corino	Former ECWA Tag team champion, founder of WORLD-1 Wrestling
73	2023	Jay D Luscious	Two time ECWA Tag Team champion
74	2023	Mad Dog Marley	Former ECWA Tag Team Champion
75	2023	Brady Hicks	Commentator, PWI Magazine contributor
76	2023	Chris Wylde	Former ECWA Champion
77	2025	The Closer Joey Martinez	Former ECWA Heavyweight champion

== See also ==
- List of independent wrestling promotions in the United States
