= 2001 in professional wrestling =

2001 in professional wrestling describes the year's events in the world of professional wrestling.

== List of notable promotions ==
These promotions held notable events in 2001.

Promotion Name	Abbreviation	Notes
All Japan Pro Wrestling	AJPW	
Big Japan Pro Wrestling	BJW	
Consejo Mundial de Lucha Libre	CMLL	
Extreme Championship Wrestling	ECW	ECW closed in April due to financial trouble, after which, former ECW stars began appearing on WWF programming, but still promoted as ECW stars for The Invasion storyline. The promotion's assets were later acquired by the WWF (which at that point had been renamed to WWE) in 2003.
Frontier Martial-Arts Wrestling	FMW	
Lucha Libre AAA Worldwide	AAA	The "AAA" abbreviation has been used since the mid-1990s and had previously stood for the promotion's original name Asistencia Asesoría y Administración.
New Japan Pro-Wrestling	NJPW	
World Championship Wrestling	WCW	The majority of WCW's assets were acquired by rival company WWF in March following the cancellation of its programming, after which, former WCW stars began appearing on WWF programming, but still promoted as WCW stars for The Invasion storyline.
World Wrestling All-Stars	WWA	
World Wrestling Council	WWC	
World Wrestling Federation	WWF	
World Xtreme Wrestling	WXW	

== Calendar of notable shows ==
=== January ===
Date	Promotion(s)	Event	Location	Main Event
January 4	NJPW	Wrestling World	Tokyo, Japan	Kensuke Sasaki defeated Toshiaki Kawada in a Singles match: IWGP Heavyweight Championship tournament final
January 7	FMW	New Year Generation 2001: Day 1	Tokyo, Japan	Kodo Fuyuki and Tetsuhiro Kuroda vs. Masato Tanaka and Gedo in a tag team match
January 7	ECW	Guilty as Charged	New York, New York	Rob Van Dam defeated Jerry Lynn in a Singles match
January 14	WCW	Sin	Indianapolis, Indiana	Scott Steiner (c) defeated Jeff Jarrett, Sid Vicious and Road Warrior Animal in a Four corners match for the WCW World Heavyweight Championship
January 16	FMW	New Year Generation 2001: Day 6	Tokyo, Japan	Kodo Fuyuki vs. Tetsuhiro Kuroda in a Singles match
January 21	WWF	Royal Rumble	New Orleans, Louisiana	Stone Cold Steve Austin won by last eliminating Kane in a 30-man Royal Rumble match for a WWF Championship match at WrestleMania X-Seven
January 28	AJPW; NJPW	Giant Baba Memorial Spectacular	Tokyo, Japan	Kensuke Sasaki (c - IWGP Heavyweight Champion) and Toshiaki Kawada defeated Genichiro Tenryu (c - AJPW Triple Crown Heavyweight Champion) and Hiroshi Hase in a Non-Title Dream match
(c) – denotes defending champion(s)

=== February ===
Date	Promotion(s)	Event	Location	Main Event
February 6	FMW	New Year Generation 2001: Day 6	Tokyo, Japan	Kodo Fuyuki, GOEMON and Onryo vs. Tetsuhiro Kuroda, Mammoth Sasaki and Kyoko Inoue in a tag team match
February 14	WOW	WOW Unleashed	Los Angeles, California	Thug defeated Selina Majors in a Steel Cage Match
February 18	WCW	SuperBrawl Revenge	Nashville, Tennessee	Scott Steiner (c) defeated Kevin Nash 2–1 in a Two-out-of-three falls "loser leaves WCW" match for the WCW World Heavyweight Championship
February 25	WWF	No Way Out	Las Vegas, Nevada	The Rock defeated Kurt Angle (c) in a Singles match for the WWF Championship
(c) – denotes defending champion(s)

=== March ===
Date	Promotion(s)	Event	Location	Main Event
March 5	FMW	Winning Road 2001: Tag 2	Tokyo, Japan	The Great Sasuke vs. Tetsuhiro Kuroda in a Singles match
March 13	FMW	Winning Road 2001: Tag 7	Tokyo, Japan	Kintaro Kanemura vs. Tetsuhiro Kuroda in a Singles match
March 18	WCW	Greed	Jacksonville, Florida	Scott Steiner (c) defeated Diamond Dallas Page by technical submission in a Falls Count Anywhere match for the WCW World Heavyweight Championship
March 30	AAA	Rey de Reyes	Ciudad Madero, Mexico	La Parka Jr. defeated Latin Lover, Abismo Negro and Heavy Metal in a Rey de Reyes 2001 Final elimination match
March 30	CMLL	Juicio Final	Mexico City, Mexico	Universo 2000 defeated Perro Aguayo - Two falls to one in a Best two-out-of-three falls Lucha de Apuestas, mask vs. hair match
(c) – denotes defending champion(s)

=== April ===
Date	Promotion(s)	Event	Location	Main Event
April 1	FMW	Fighting Creation 2001: Tag 2	Tokyo, Japan	Kodo Fuyuki vs. Tetsuhiro Kuroda in a Singles match
April 1	WWF	WrestleMania X-Seven	Houston, Texas	Stone Cold Steve Austin defeated The Rock (c) in a No Disqualification match for the WWF Championship
April 13	CMLL	45. Aniversario de Arena México	Mexico City, Mexico	Dr. Wagner Jr., El Satánico and Negro Casas defeated Hijo del Santo, Emilio Charles Jr. and Último Guerrero by disqualification
April 15	FMW	Fighting Creation 2001: Tag 3	Tokyo, Japan	Team Kuroda (Tetsuhiro Kuroda, Mr. Gannosuke and Mammoth Sasaki) vs. The Great Sasuke, GOEMON and Onryo in a Six-man tag team match
April 29	WWF	Backlash	Rosemont, Illinois	The Two-Man Power Trip (Stone Cold Steve Austin (c - WWF) and Triple H (c - Intercontinental)) defeated The Brothers of Destruction (Kane and The Undertaker) (c - WWF Tag Team) in a Tag team match for the WWF Tag Team, WWF Intercontinental, and WWF Championships
(c) – denotes defending champion(s)

=== May ===
Date	Promotion(s)	Event	Location	Main Event
May 5	NJPW	Wrestling Dontaku	Fukuoka, Japan	Manabu Nakanishi and Riki Choshu defeated Kazunari Murakami and Naoya Ogawa in a tag team match
May 5	FMW	FMW 12th Anniversary Show	Kawasaki, Kanagawa, Japan	Hayabusa and The Great Sasuke defeated Tetsuhiro Kuroda and Mr. Gannosuke in an Exploding 15000 Volt Thunderbolt Octagon Cage Bomb Deathmatch
May 5	WWF	Insurrextion	London, England	The Undertaker defeated The Power Trip (Stone Cold Steve Austin (c) and Triple H) in a Handicap match for the WWF Championship
May 11	FMW	Neo 2001: Day 1	Tokyo, Japan	Hayabusa, Hisakatsu Oya and Ricky Fuji vs. Team Kuroda (Tetsuhiro Kuroda, Mr. Gannosuke and Mammoth Sasaki) in a Six-man tag team match
May 20	WWF	Judgment Day	Sacramento, California	Stone Cold Steve Austin (c) defeated The Undertaker in a No Holds Barred match for the WWF Championship
May 26	AAA	Triplemanía IX	Mexico City, Mexico	Pirata Morgan lost to Sangre Chicana, El Cobarde II was also in the match in a Dog collar match Lucha de Apuestas "Hair vs. Hair" match
(c) – denotes defending champion(s)

=== June ===
Date	Promotion(s)	Event	Location	Main Event
June 8	FMW	King of Fight 2001: Day 1	Tokyo, Japan	Hayabusa and Tetsuhiro Kuroda vs. Mr. Gannosuke and Kintaro Kanemura in a Six-man tag team match
June 24	WWF	King of the Ring	East Rutherford, New Jersey	Stone Cold Steve Austin (c) defeated Chris Benoit and Chris Jericho in a Triple threat match for the WWF Championship
(c) – denotes defending champion(s)

=== July ===
Date	Promotion(s)	Event	Location	Main Event
July 20	FMW	King of Fight II 2001: Day 9	Tokyo, Japan	Kodo Fuyuki, Mr. Gannosuke, Kintaro Kanemura and Senmu Yoshida vs. Hayabusa, Tetsuhiro Kuroda, Azusa Kudo and Shoichi Arai in an eight-man tag team match
July 22	WWF	Invasion	Cleveland, Ohio	The WCW-ECW Coalition (Booker T, Bubba Ray Dudley, Diamond Dallas Page, D-Von Dudley and Rhyno) (Alliance) defeated Team WWF (Chris Jericho, Kane, Kurt Angle, Stone Cold Steve Austin and The Undertaker) (WWF) in a ten-man tag team match
July 24	FMW	Rolling Thunder Riverside Death Match Series In Edogawa Kyotei	Tokyo, Japan	GOEMON and Hayabusa defeated Chocoball Mukai and Kodo Fuyuki in a tag team match
(c) – denotes defending champion(s)

=== August ===
Date	Promotion(s)	Event	Location	Main Event
August 3	FMW	Super Dynamism 2001: Day 4	Tokyo, Japan	Mr. Gannosuke, Kintaro Kanemura and Mammoth Sasaki vs. Hayabusa, GOEMON and Onryo in a Six-man tag team match
August 9	N/A	Fourth Annual Brian Pillman Memorial Show	Cincinnati, Ohio	The Hardy Boyz (Matt Hardy and Jeff Hardy) (WWF) defeated Edge and Christian (WWF) and Diamond Dallas Page and Kanyon (WCW) in a Three-way match
August 4–12	NJPW	G1 Climax	Tokyo	Yuji Nagata defeated Keiji Mutoh in a G1 Climax tournament final
August 11	N/A	Terry Gordy Memorial Show	Birmingham, Alabama	P.S. Michael Hayes and Ray Gordy defeated Tony Anthony and "Nightmare" Ken Wayne in a tag team match
August 11	FMW	Super Dynamism 2001: Day 6	Tokyo, Japan	Hayabusa vs. Kintaro Kanemura in a Singles match
August 19	WWF	SummerSlam	San Jose, California	The Rock (WWF) defeated Booker T (c) (Alliance) in a Singles match for the WCW Championship
(c) – denotes defending champion(s)

=== September ===
Date	Promotion(s)	Event	Location	Main Event
September 8	WWC	WWC 28th Aniversario	Bayamón, Puerto Rico	Abdullah the Butcher defeated Big Hail by disqualification in a Singles match
September 9	FMW	Super Dynamism 2001: Day 14	Tokyo, Japan	Kintaro Kanemura, Kodo Fuyuki and Mr. Gannosuke vs. Hayabusa, Tetsuhiro Kuroda and GOEMON in a Six-man tag team match
September 16	AAA	Verano de Escándalo	Naucalpan, Mexico	Canek, Zorro, Latin Lover, and Heavy Metal defeated Cibernético, Headhunter I, Electroshock, and Abismo Negro in an Eight-man "Atómicos" tag team match
September 23	WWF	Unforgiven	Pittsburgh, Pennsylvania	Kurt Angle (WWF) defeated Stone Cold Steve Austin (c) (Alliance) by submission in a Singles match for the WWF Championship
September 28	CMLL	CMLL 68th Anniversary Show	Mexico City, Mexico	Máscara Mágica lost to El Satánico; Also in the match: Último Guerrero, Rey Bucanero, Tarzan Boy, Mephisto and Averno in a Seven-man steel cage match elimination Lucha de Apuestas match
(c) – denotes defending champion(s)

=== October ===
Date	Promotion(s)	Event	Location	Main Event
October 9	FMW	Power Splash 2001: Day 4	Tokyo, Japan	Mr. Gannosuke and Mammoth Sasaki vs. Hayabusa and Tetsuhiro Kuroda in a tag team match
October 21	WWF	No Mercy	St. Louis, Missouri	Stone Cold Steve Austin (c) (Alliance) defeated Kurt Angle (WWF) and Rob Van Dam (Alliance) in a Triple threat match for the WWF Championship
October 22	FMW	Power Splash 2001: Day 13	Tokyo, Japan	Hayabusa vs. Mammoth Sasaki in a Singles match
October 26	WWA	The Inception	Sydney, Australia	Jeff Jarrett defeated Road Dogg in a Steel Cage match tournament final for the vacant WWA World Heavyweight Championship
(c) – denotes defending champion(s)

=== November ===
Date	Promotion(s)	Event	Location	Main Event	Notes
November 3	FMW	Iizuka Car Race Special I	Iizuka, Fukuoka, Japan	Onryo and Tetsuhiro Kuroda defeated Chocoball Mukai and Kodo Fuyuki in a tag team match	
November 3	WWF	Rebellion	Manchester, England	Stone Cold Steve Austin (c) (Alliance) defeated The Rock (WWF) in a Singles match for the WWF Championship	
November 4	FMW	Iizuka Car Race Special II	Iizuka, Fukuoka, Japan	Kintaro Kanemura, Kodo Fuyuki and Mr. Gannosuke vs. GOEMON, Onryo and Ricky Fuji in a tag team match	
November 5	FMW	Scramble Survivor 2001: Day 1	Tokyo, Japan	Kodo Fuyuki, Arashi and Koki Kitahara vs. Tetsuhiro Kuroda, Hisakatsu Oya and Ricky Fuji in a Six-man tag team match	
November 18	WWF	Survivor Series	Greensboro, North Carolina	Team WWF (The Rock, Chris Jericho, The Undertaker, Kane and Big Show) defeated The Alliance (Stone Cold Steve Austin, Kurt Angle, Rob Van Dam, Booker T and Shane McMahon) in a Winner Takes All 5-on-5 Survivor Series elimination match	
November 23	AAA	Guerra de Titanes	Mexico City, Mexico	Heavy Metal lost to Perro Aguayo Jr., Héctor Garza and Latin Lover in a Luchas de Apuestas "loser loses his hair elimination" match	
November 23	FMW	Scramble Survivor 2001: Day 1	Tokyo, Japan	Tetsuhiro Kuroda and Garuda vs. Kodo Fuyuki and Genichiro Tenryu in a tag team match	
November 29	WXW	Yokozuna Memorial Show	Allentown, Pennsylvania	The Headshrinkers (Rikishi and Samu) defeated Da Hit Squad (Monsta Mack and Mafia) in a tag team match	
(c) – denotes defending champion(s)

=== December ===
Date	Promotion(s)	Event	Location	Main Event
2	BJW	Ante Up	Yokohama, Japan	Daisuke Sekimoto and Men's Teioh (c-BJW) vs. Kintaro Kanemura and Ryuji Yamakawa (c-WEW Hardcore) in a Winners Take All tag team match for the BJW Tag Team and WEW Hardcore Tag Team Championships
December 9	FMW	FMW PPV	Tokyo, Japan	Team FMW (Tetsuhiro Kuroda, Kintaro Kanemura, Mr. Gannosuke and Mammoth Sasaki) vs. Team WAR (Genichiro Tenryu, Kodo Fuyuki, Arashi and Koki Kitahara)
December 9	WWF	Vengeance	San Diego, California	Chris Jericho (World Champion) defeated Stone Cold Steve Austin (WWF Champion) in a Unification match for the World Championship and WWF Championship into the Undisputed WWF Championship
December 14	CMLL	Sin Piedad	Mexico City, Mexico	Shocker defeated Emilio Charles Jr. in a Best two-out-of three falls Lucha de Apuesta, hair vs. hair match
December 21	FMW	Year End Sensation 2001	Tokyo, Japan	Tetsuhiro Kuroda and Mr. Gannosuke vs. Kintaro Kanemura and Mammoth Sasaki in a tag team match
(c) – denotes defending champion(s)

== Accomplishments and tournaments ==
=== AAA ===
Accomplishment	Winner	Date won	Notes
Rey de Reyes	La Parka Jr.	March 30	

=== AJW ===
Accomplishment	Winner	Date won	Notes
Japan Grand Prix 2001	Momoe Nakanishi	August 17	
Tag League The Best 2001	Manami Toyota and Yumiko Hotta	December 2	

=== WCW ===
Accomplishment	Winner	Date won	Notes
WCW Cruiserweight Tag Team Championship Tournament	Elix Skipper and Kid Romeo	March 18	

=== WWF ===
Accomplishment	Winner	Date won	Notes
Royal Rumble	Stone Cold Steve Austin	January 21	Last eliminated Kane to win a WWF Championship match at WrestleMania X-Seven, which he subsequently won from The Rock in a no disqualification match.
King of the Ring	Edge	June 24	Defeated Kurt Angle in the tournament final to win and be crowned King of the Ring.
Undisputed WWF Championship Tournament	Chris Jericho	December 9	Defeated Stone Cold Steve Austin in the tournament final to unify the WWF Championship and World Championship and become the Undisputed WWF Champion.

== Awards and honors ==
=== Pro Wrestling Illustrated ===
Category	Winner
PWI Wrestler of the Year	Stone Cold Steve Austin
PWI Tag Team of the Year	The Dudley Boyz (Bubba Ray and D-Von Dudley)
PWI Match of the Year	The Dudley Boyz vs. The Hardy Boyz vs. Edge and Christian (WrestleMania X-Seven)
PWI Feud of the Year	Shane McMahon vs. Vince McMahon
PWI Most Popular Wrestler of the Year	Rob Van Dam
PWI Most Hated Wrestler of the Year	Stone Cold Steve Austin
PWI Comeback of the Year	Rob Van Dam
PWI Most Improved Wrestler of the Year	Edge
PWI Most Inspirational Wrestler of the Year	Kurt Angle
PWI Rookie of the Year	Randy Orton
PWI Woman of the Year	Lita
PWI Editor's Award	Johnny Valentine

=== Wrestling Observer Newsletter ===
==== Wrestling Observer Newsletter Hall of Fame ====
Inductee
Black Shadow
Diablo Velasco
Lizmark
Bull Nakano
El Satánico

==== Wrestling Observer Newsletter awards ====
Category	Winner
Wrestler of the Year	Keiji Mutoh
Most Outstanding	Kurt Angle
Tag Team of the Year	Satoshi Kojima and Hiroyoshi Tenzan
Most Improved	Keiji Mutoh
Best on Interviews	Stone Cold Steve Austin

== Title changes ==
=== ECW ===
ECW World Heavyweight Championship
Incoming champion – Steve Corino
Date	Winner	Event/Show	Note(s)
January 7	The Sandman	Guilty as Charged	This was a Tables, Ladders, Chairs, and Canes match also involving Justin Credible.
January 7	Rhino	Guilty as Charged	
April 11	Deactivated	N/A	ECW closed on April 4, and World Wrestling Entertainment purchased its assets in 2003.

ECW World Television Championship
Incoming champion – Rhino
Date	Winner	Event/Show	Note(s)
April 11	Deactivated	N/A	

ECW World Tag Team Championship
Incoming champions – Danny Doring and Roadkill
Date	Winner	Event/Show	Note(s)
April 11	Deactivated	N/A	

=== NJPW ===
IWGP Heavyweight Championship
Incoming champion – Vacant
Date	Winner	Event/Show	Note(s)
January 4	Kensuke Sasaki	Wrestling World	
March 17	Scott Norton	N/A	
April 9	Kazuyuki Fujita	Strong Style	

IWGP Tag Team Championship
Incoming champions – Tencozy (Hiroyoshi Tenzan and Satoshi Kojima)
Date	Winner	Event/Show	Note(s)
September 23	Osamu Nishimura and Tatsumi Fujinami	G1 World	
October 28	BATT (Keiji Mutoh and Taiyo Kea)	Survival 2001: Fighting Destination in Fukuoka	

IWGP Junior Heavyweight Championship
Incoming champion – Minoru Tanaka
Date	Winner	Event/Show	Note(s)
July 20	Masayuki Naruse	Dome Quake	
October 29	Kendo Kashin	Indicate of Next	

IWGP Junior Heavyweight Tag Team Championship
Incoming champions – Koji Kanemoto and Minoru Tanaka
Date	Winner	Event/Show	Note(s)
March 6	El Samurai and Jushin Thunder Liger	Hyper Battle	
July 20	Gedo and Jado	Dome Quake	

=== WCW ===
WCW World Heavyweight Championship
Incoming champion – Scott Steiner
Date	Winner	Event/Show	Note(s)
March 26	Booker T	Nitro	This was the final episode of Nitro as WCW was purchased by the WWF on March 23.
After being acquired by the World Wrestling Federation (WWF), the title was then defended on WWF programming where it was referred to as the WCW Championship.
July 24 (aired July 26)	Kurt Angle	SmackDown!	
July 30	Booker T	Raw Is War	
August 19	The Rock	SummerSlam	
October 21	Chris Jericho	No Mercy	
November 5	The Rock	Raw	
The title was renamed to World Championship on November 19 after the demise of The Alliance.
December 9	Chris Jericho	Vengeance	After defeating The Rock for the World Championship, Chris Jericho defeated Stone Cold Steve Austin to unify the World Championship with the WWF Championship.
December 9	Unified	Vengeance	After unification with the WWF Championship, the World Championship was retired and the WWF Championship became the Undisputed WWF Championship.

WCW Cruiserweight Championship
Incoming champion – Chavo Guerrero Jr.
Date	Winner	Event/Show	Note(s)
March 18	Shane Helms	Greed	
After being acquired by the World Wrestling Federation (WWF) on March 23, the title was then defended on WWF programming.
July 3 (aired July 5)	Billy Kidman	SmackDown!	
July 30	X-Pac	Raw Is War	
October 9 (aired October 11)	Billy Kidman	SmackDown!	
October 22	Tajiri	Raw	
Title was renamed WWF Cruiserweight Championship on November 18 at Survivor Series.

WCW United States Heavyweight Championship
Incoming champion – General Rection
Date	Winner	Event/Show	Note(s)
January 14	Shane Douglas	Sin	
February 5	Rick Steiner	Nitro	
March 18	Booker T	Greed	
After being acquired by the World Wrestling Federation (WWF) on March 23, the title was then defended on WWF programming where it was referred to as the WCW United States Championship.
July 24 (aired July 26)	Kanyon	SmackDown!	Given the title by Booker T since Booker also held the WCW Championship.
September 10	Tajiri	Raw is War	
September 23	Rhyno	Unforgiven	
October 22	Kurt Angle	Raw	
November 12	Edge	Raw	
November 18	Deactivated	Survivor Series	At the event, Edge defeated WWF Intercontinental Champion Test to unify the Intercontinental and United States championships. The United States Championship was deactivated in favor of continuing the Intercontinental Championship.

WCW Hardcore Championship
Incoming champion – Terry Funk
Date	Winner	Event/Show	Note(s)
January 14	Meng	Sin	This was a triple threat hardcore match also involving Crowbar
January 21	Deactivated	N/A	Meng left WCW for the World Wrestling Federation (WWF) a week after winning the title to compete as Haku in the WWF's Royal Rumble and the title was abandoned

WCW Cruiserweight Tag Team Championship
(Title created)
Date	Winner	Event/Show	Note(s)
March 18	Kid Romeo and Elix Skipper	Greed	Defeated the Filthy Animals in a tournament final to become the inaugural champions
March 26	The Filthy Animals (Billy Kidman and Rey Misterio Jr.)	Monday Nitro: Night of Champions	
March 26	Abandoned	N/A	The World Wrestling Federation (WWF) purchased WCW and the Cruiserweight Tag Team Championship was abandoned.

WCW World Tag Team Championship
Incoming champions – The Insiders (Diamond Dallas Page and Kevin Nash)
Date	Winner	Event/Show	Note(s)
January 14	The Natural Born Thrillers (Chuck Palumbo and Sean O'Haire)	Sin	
After being acquired by the World Wrestling Federation (WWF) on March 23, the title was then defended on WWF programming where it was referred to as the WCW Tag Team Championship.
August 7 (aired August 9)	The Brothers of Destruction (Kane and The Undertaker)	SmackDown!	
September 25 (aired September 27)	Booker T and Test	SmackDown!	
October 8	The Hardy Boyz (Matt and Jeff Hardy)	Raw	
October 23 (aired October 25)	The Dudley Boyz (Bubba Ray and D-Von Dudley)	SmackDown!	
November 18	Unified	Survivor Series	Unified with the WWF Tag Team Championship after The Dudley Boyz defeated WWF Tag Team Champions The Hardy Boyz in a title unification match.

=== WWF ===
WWF Championship
Incoming champion – Kurt Angle
Date	Winner	Event/Show	Note(s)
February 25	The Rock	No Way Out	After the WWF purchased World Championship Wrestling (WCW) in March, the WCW Championship became a second concurrently active world championship in the WWF.
April 1	Stone Cold Steve Austin	WrestleMania X-Seven	This was a no disqualification match.
September 23	Kurt Angle	Unforgiven	
October 8	Stone Cold Steve Austin	Raw	
December 9	Chris Jericho	Vengeance	Earlier the same night, Jericho defeated (WCW) World Champion The Rock for that title. By defeating Stone Cold Steve Austin for the WWF Championship, Jericho unified both titles as the Undisputed WWF Championship.
Title was renamed Undisputed WWF Championship.

WWF Intercontinental Championship
Incoming champion – Chris Benoit
Date	Winner	Event/Show	Note(s)
January 21	Chris Jericho	Royal Rumble	This was a ladder match.
April 3 (aired April 5)	Triple H	SmackDown!	
April 10 (aired April 12)	Jeff Hardy	SmackDown!	
April 16	Triple H	Raw Is War	
May 20	Kane	Judgment Day	This was a Chain match
June 26 (aired June 28)	Albert	SmackDown!	
July 23	Lance Storm	Raw Is War	
August 19	Edge	SummerSlam	
September 23	Christian	Unforgiven	
October 21	Edge	No Mercy	
November 5	Test	Raw	
November 18	Edge	Survivor Series	Title unification match, in which the WCW United States Championship, which Edge held, was unified with the WWF Intercontinental Championship. The United States Championship was deactivated in favor of continuing the Intercontinental Championship.

WWF Light Heavyweight Championship
Incoming champion – Dean Malenko
Date	Winner	Event/Show	Note(s)
March 13 (aired March 18)	Crash Holly	Sunday Night Heat	
April 29	Jerry Lynn	Sunday Night Heat	
June 5 (aired June 7)	Jeff Hardy	SmackDown!	
June 25	X-Pac	Raw Is War	
August 6	Tajiri	Raw Is War	
August 19	X-Pac	SummerSlam	

WWF Women's Championship
Incoming champion – Ivory
Date	Winner	Event/Show	Note(s)
April 1	Chyna	WrestleMania X-Seven	
November 1	Vacated	N/A	
November 18	Trish Stratus	Survivor Series	This was a six pack challenge for the vacant title also involving Ivory (Alliance), Jazz (Alliance), Jacqueline (WWF), Lita (WWF), and Mighty Molly (Alliance).

WWF European Championship
Incoming champion – William Regal
Date	Winner	Event/Show	Note(s)
January 22	Test	Raw Is War	
April 1	Eddie Guerrero	WrestleMania X-Seven	
April 24 (aired April 26)	Matt Hardy	SmackDown!	
August 27	The Hurricane	Raw Is War	
October 22	Bradshaw	Raw	
October 30 (aired November 1)	Christian	SmackDown!	

WWF Tag Team Championship
Incoming champions – Edge and Christian
Date	Winner	Event/Show	Note(s)
January 21	The Dudley Boyz (Bubba Ray and D-Von Dudley)	Royal Rumble	
March 5	The Hardy Boyz (Matt and Jeff Hardy)	Raw Is War	
March 19	Edge and Christian	Raw Is War	
March 19	The Dudley Boyz (Bubba Ray and D-Von Dudley)	Raw Is War	
April 1	Edge and Christian	WrestleMania X-Seven	This was a Tables, Ladders and Chairs match also involving The Hardy Boyz.
April 17 (aired April 19)	The Brothers of Destruction (Kane and The Undertaker)	SmackDown!	
April 29	The Two-Man Power Trip (Stone Cold Steve Austin and Triple H)	Backlash	
May 21	Chris Benoit and Chris Jericho	Raw Is War	
June 19 (aired June 21)	The Dudley Boyz (Bubba Ray and D-Von Dudley)	SmackDown!	
July 9	The Acolytes Protection Agency (Bradshaw and Faarooq)	Raw Is War	
August 7 (aired August 9)	Diamond Dallas Page and Kanyon	SmackDown!	
August 19	The Brothers of Destruction (Kane and The Undertaker)	SummerSlam	
September 17	The Dudley Boyz (Bubba Ray and D-Von Dudley)	Raw Is War	
October 22	Chris Jericho and The Rock	Raw	
October 30 (aired November 1)	Booker T and Test	SmackDown!	
November 12	The Hardy Boyz (Matt and Jeff Hardy)	Raw	
November 18	The Dudley Boyz (Bubba Ray and D-Von Dudley)	Survivor Series	Title unification match, in which the WCW Tag Team Championship, which The Dudley Boyz held, was unified with the WWF Tag Team Championship.

WWF Hardcore Championship
Incoming champion – Raven
Date	Winner	Event/Show	Note(s)
January 22	Al Snow	Raw Is War	
January 22	Raven	Raw Is War	
February 3	K-Kwik	House show	
February 3	Crash Holly	House show	
February 3	Raven	House show	
February 4	K-Kwik	House show	
February 4	Crash Holly	House show	
February 4	Raven	House show	
February 6 (aired February 8)	Hardcore Holly	SmackDown!	
February 6 (aired February 8)	Raven	SmackDown!	
February 10	Hardcore Holly	House show	
February 10	Raven	House show	
February 11	Hardcore Holly	House show	
February 11	Al Snow	House show	
February 11	Raven	House show	
February 17	Steve Blackman	House show	
February 17	Raven	House show	
February 18	Steve Blackman	House show	
February 18	Raven	House show	
February 25	Billy Gunn	No Way Out	Pinned Raven during a title defense against Big Show.
February 25	Raven	No Way Out	
February 25	Big Show	No Way Out	
March 19	Raven	Raw Is War	
April 1	Kane	WrestleMania X-Seven	This was a Triple Threat Hardcore match also involving Big Show.
April 17 (aired April 19)	Rhyno	SmackDown!	
May 21	Big Show	Raw Is War	
May 28	Chris Jericho	Raw Is War	
May 28	Rhyno	Raw Is War	
June 12 (aired June 14)	Test	SmackDown!	
June 25	Rhyno	Raw Is War	
June 25	Mike Awesome	Raw Is War	
July 10 (aired July 12)	Jeff Hardy	SmackDown!	
July 22	Rob Van Dam	Invasion	
August 13	Jeff Hardy	Raw Is War	Pinned Rob Van Dam during a title defense against Kurt Angle.
August 19	Rob Van Dam	SummerSlam	
September 10	Kurt Angle	Raw Is War	
September 10	Rob Van Dam	Raw Is War	
December 9	The Undertaker	Vengeance	

WWF Cruiserweight Championship
Incoming champion – Tajiri
Date	Winner	Event/Show	Note(s)
Title was renamed from WCW to WWF on November 18 at Survivor Series.

== Debuts ==
- Uncertain debut date

- Kris Pavone
- Nidia Guenard
- Sara Del Ray
- Heidenreich
- Brian Gamble

- February 15 – Harashima
- March 18 - Aaron Idol
- May – Beth Phoenix
- May 19 - Izanagi
- June 10 - Keiko Furuta (Jd' Star)
- June 23 – Damien Sandow
- September 23 - Mirai (All Japan Women's), Fumiko Yamane (All Japan Women's) and Tomoko Mori (All Japan Women's)
- October 2 – Maven
- October 6 – Daigoro Kashiwa
- October 28 - Saki Maemura (All Japan Women's)
- November 4 – Gorgeous Matsuno
- November 11 – Ayako Sato
- November 23 - Finn Balor
- December 7 - Jay Lethal
- December 20 – Ken Ohka

== Retirements ==
- Midnight (1999-March 2001)
- Tori (1988-September 2001)
- Al Green (1989–2001) (returned for a match in 2007)
- Bushwhacker Butch (1964-September 2001)
- Duke Droese (1990–2001, returned for a couple of matches in 2019)
- Hardbody Harrison (1995-March 2001)
- Dean Malenko (1979-December 2001, became a road agent for WWE)
- Russ McCullough (1999-December 2001)
- Nailz (1982–2001)
- One Man Gang (1977–2001) (returned to wrestle in 2007 until 2009)
- Fred Ottman (1984-April 2001, returned to wrestle a couple of matches in 2009)
- Miguel Pérez Sr. (October 17, 1954-April 7, 2001)
- Stan Hansen (1973- January 28, 2001, became commissioner for All Japan Pro Wrestling until 2007)

== Births ==
- January 14 – Cora Jade
- March 14 – Daiki Odashima
- April 4 - Kerry Morton
- June 15 - Kendal Grey
- July 12 – Ethan Allen
- August 14 – Takeshi Masada
- August 18 – Starlight Kid
- August 21 – Brooks Jensen
- November 5 – Roxanne Perez
- November 8 – Julia Hart

== Deaths ==
- January 3 – Kung Fu, 49
- January 4 – Villano I, 50
- January 18 - Rito Romero, 73
- January 29 - Smasher Sloan, 65
- March 26 - Benny McGuire, 54
- March 30 – Tuffy Truesdale, 85
- April 24 - Johnny Valentine, 72
- May 31 - Tex McKenzie, 70
- July 16 – Terry Gordy, 40
- July 21 – Dennis Coralluzzo, 48
- July 27 – Rhonda Sing, 40
- October 7 – Chris Adams, 46
- November 4 - Helen Hart, 76
- December 4 - Ed Whalen, 74
- December 15 – Russ Haas, 27
- December 25 – Mike Davis, 45

== See also ==
- List of WCW pay-per-view events
- List of WWA pay-per-view events
- List of WWF pay-per-view events
- List of ECW supercards and pay-per-view events
- List of FMW supercards and pay-per-view events
