= Robert Stone (wrestler) =

American amateur wrestler and professional wrestler (born 1983)

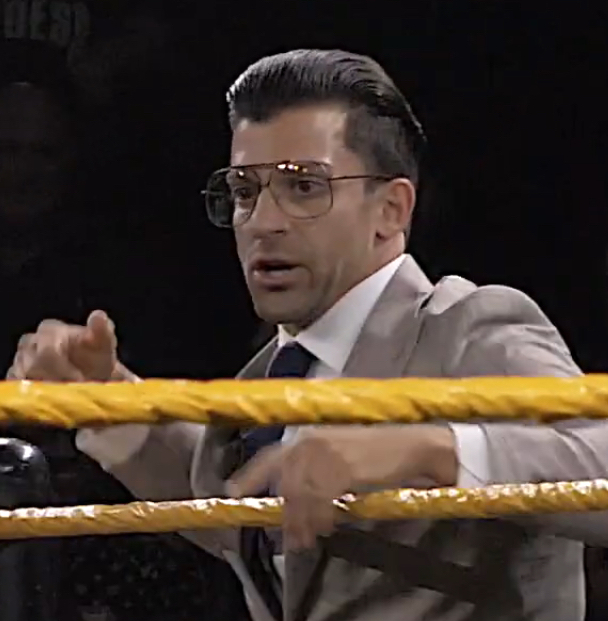
- Stone in 2020

Personal information
- Born: Robert Strauss; October 1, 1983 (age 43) Alpine, New Jersey, U.S.
- Spouse: Tara Sue Gally (m. 2011; div. 2013) (m. 2015)
- Children: 2

Professional wrestling career
- Ring name(s): Rob Eckos; Robbie E Robert Stone; Robert Strauss; Mr. Sacowea; Mr. Stone; Sheriff Stone
- Billed height: 5 ft 11 in (1.80 m)
- Billed weight: 201 lb (91 kg)
- Billed from: Seaside Heights, New Jersey; Jersey Shore
- Trained by: Kevin Knight; WWE Performance Center
- Debut: October 1, 2000

Robert Strauss (born October 1, 1983) is an American professional wrestler and manager. He is signed to WWE, where he is a producer and the on-screen NXT general manager under the ring name Robert Stone. He is best known for his time with Total Nonstop Action Wrestling (TNA), where he previously performed under the ring name Robbie E, where he was a former two-time TNA World Tag Team Champion as part of The BroMans with Jessie Godderz, while also being a former one-time TNA Television Champion and TNA X Division Champion; he also temporarily served as the Overseer to the Director of Authority under the name Sheriff Stone.

Strauss has also competed in Northeastern and Mid-Atlantic independent promotions under the ring name Rob Eckos, including Chaotic Wrestling, the East Coast Wrestling Association (ECWA), Hardway Wrestling, Jersey All Pro Wrestling (JAPW), the National Wrestling Alliance (NWA), Pro-Pain Pro Wrestling and Mikey Whipwreck's New York Wrestling Connection (NYWC).

== Early life ==
Strauss began watching professional wrestling at the age of 4 and was a fan of The Ultimate Warrior, Sting and Shawn Michaels. He knew he wanted to become a professional wrestler while at John F. Kennedy Memorial High School in his hometown of Woodbridge Township, New Jersey, even though he was skinny at 160 pounds (73 kg). He saw his first live event at a local wrestling show in Woodbridge Township, headlined by "Iron" Mike Sharpe and later became interested in becoming a professional wrestler.

== Professional wrestling career ==
=== Independent circuit (2000–2015) ===
When he turned 16, Strauss began training at Kevin Knight's Camp IWF in Woodland Park, New Jersey, where he practiced regular drills and exercises for four months until his debut against Chad Warwick on October 1, 2000. For a few short years, he taught at Woodbridge High School as a physical education teacher.

Strauss spent his early career in the Independent Wrestling Federation (IWF), a local promotion based in Woodland Park, New Jersey, performing under the name Rob Eckos. In January 2002, Eckos was one of several independent wrestlers to star in a commercial for the 2002 Royal Rumble. Eckos also made three appearances for Total Nonstop Action Wrestling (TNA) on their secondary Xplosion television show, losing to Josh Daniels on May 21, 2003, Norman Smiley on August 6, 2003, and to Team Canada (Eric Young and Johnny Devine) in a tag team match, where he teamed with Damian Adams, on July 4, 2004. A participant in the 2007 Super 8 Tournament, he defeated Billy Bax in the opening round before losing to Sonjay Dutt in the semi-finals in Newark on November 10. He later lost to Billy Bax in a rematch on December 1, 2007.

=== World Wrestling Entertainment (2005–2006) ===
Strauss made an appearance on the May 5, 2005, episode of WWE SmackDown under the ring name Rob Eckos, where he lost to Matt Morgan. On January 2, 2006, Eckos made his second appearance for World Wrestling Entertainment, when he was attacked in a skit by Edge, who was doing a mock impersonation of Ric Flair during WWE Raw. The following day, Eckos appeared on the taping for Friday Night Smackdown where he teamed alongside Gus Harlacher and John Troske in a three-on-one handicap match against Mark Henry.

=== Total Nonstop Action Wrestling / Impact Wrestling (2010-2017) ===
==== The Shore (2010–2011) ====
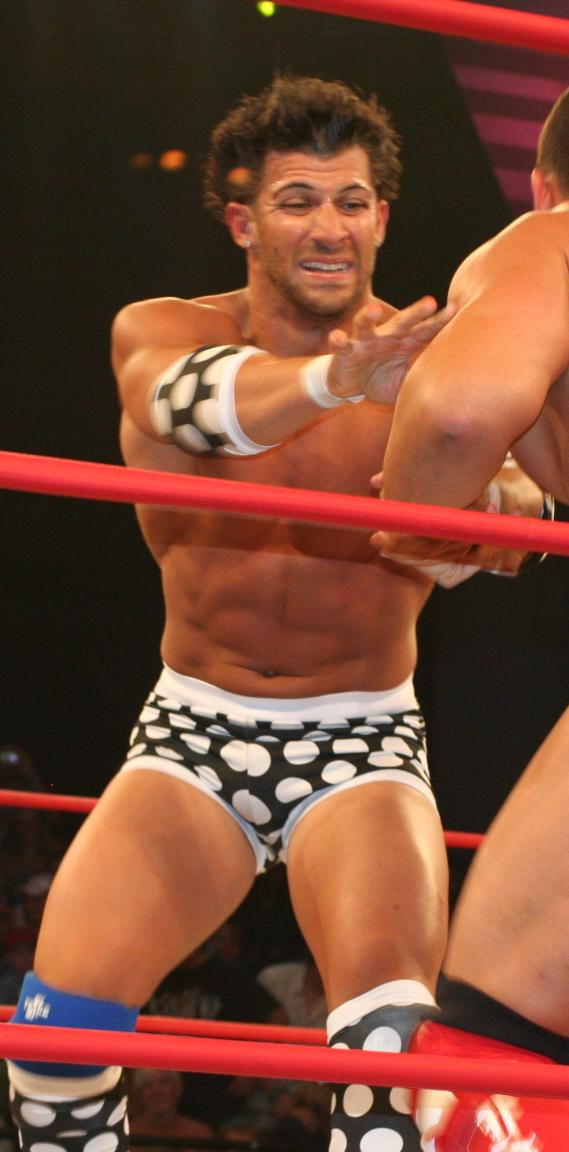
Strauss during his Total Nonstop Action Wrestling tryout in July 2010

On July 27, 2010, Strauss wrestled in a tryout dark match for Total Nonstop Action Wrestling, losing to Bobby Fish. On August 5, it was reported that TNA had signed Strauss to a contract. At the August 10 tapings of TNA Impact! Strauss wrestled a dark match under the ring name Robbie E with a gimmick inspired by DJ Pauly D and the television show Jersey Shore, defeating Jeremy Buck, while being managed by Cookie. On the August 26 edition of Impact!, vignettes began airing to promote Strauss' upcoming debut. Prior to their televised debuts, Robbie E and Cookie made an appearance on September 24 at TNA's live event at The Arena in Philadelphia, Pennsylvania, interrupting Jeremy Borash and insulting the crowd, before Robbie E was defeated in a match by Rhyno. At the following day's event in Rahway, New Jersey, Robbie E and Cookie interrupted Mick Foley, before Robbie E was again defeated in a match against Rhyno, with Foley serving as the special guest referee. Robbie E and Cookie made their televised debuts on the October 7 live edition of Impact!, cutting a promo insulting the Florida crowd. The following Sunday at Bound for Glory Robbie E attacked X Division Champion Jay Lethal after his title match with Douglas Williams, claiming he was a disgrace to New Jersey. Robbie E and Cookie gained mainstream attention through the following edition of Impact!, where Cookie had a cat fight with Jersey Shore cast member Jenni "JWoww" Farley.

Robbie E made his in–ring debut the following week, defeating Amazing Red, and afterwards called out X Division Champion Jay Lethal. The following week Robbie E defeated Lethal in a non–title street fight, after interference from Cookie, to earn the right to challenge for the X Division Championship. On November 7 at Turning Point, Robbie E defeated Lethal, with help from Cookie, to win the X Division Championship for the first time. The following month at Final Resolution Robbie E retained the title in a rematch via disqualification, when Lethal was caught using Cookie's hairspray on him. During the match Cookie was suspended above the ring in a shark cage. On December 7 at the tapings of the December 16 edition of Impact!, Robbie E lost the X Division Championship back to Lethal.

On the February 10 edition of Impact!, Robbie E entered a tournament to determine a new number one contender to the X Division Championship, now held by Kazarian, and defeated Brian Kendrick and Suicide in a three-way match to advance to the finals at Against All Odds. Robbie E won the finals at Against All Odds via forfeit, after both of his competitors, Jeremy and Max Buck were unable to attend the event due to travel issues. Kazarian granted Robbie E his title match immediately afterwards and defeated him to retain the X Division Championship. On the following edition of Impact! Robbie E complained about the rushed title match and was granted another shot at the X Division Championship, but lost via disqualification, after Cookie interfered in the match. After the match Kazarian's real life wife Traci Brooks returned to TNA and helped her husband chase Robbie E and Cookie out of the ring. On the March 3 edition of Impact! Robbie E and Cookie aligned themselves with former Jersey Shore cast member Angelina Pivarnick, with whom they bonded through their mutual dislike of Jenni "JWoww" Farley, whom Pivarnick proceeded to challenge to a match. On March 13 at Victory Road, Robbie E received another shot at Kazarian and the X Division Championship, this time in an Ultimate X match, which also included Jeremy and Max Buck, but was again unsuccessful in his attempt to regain the title. On the August 11 edition of Impact Wrestling, Robbie E broke up with Cookie, after she inadvertently cost him his match against X Division Champion Brian Kendrick.

==== Teaming and feuding with Rob Terry (2011–2013) ====
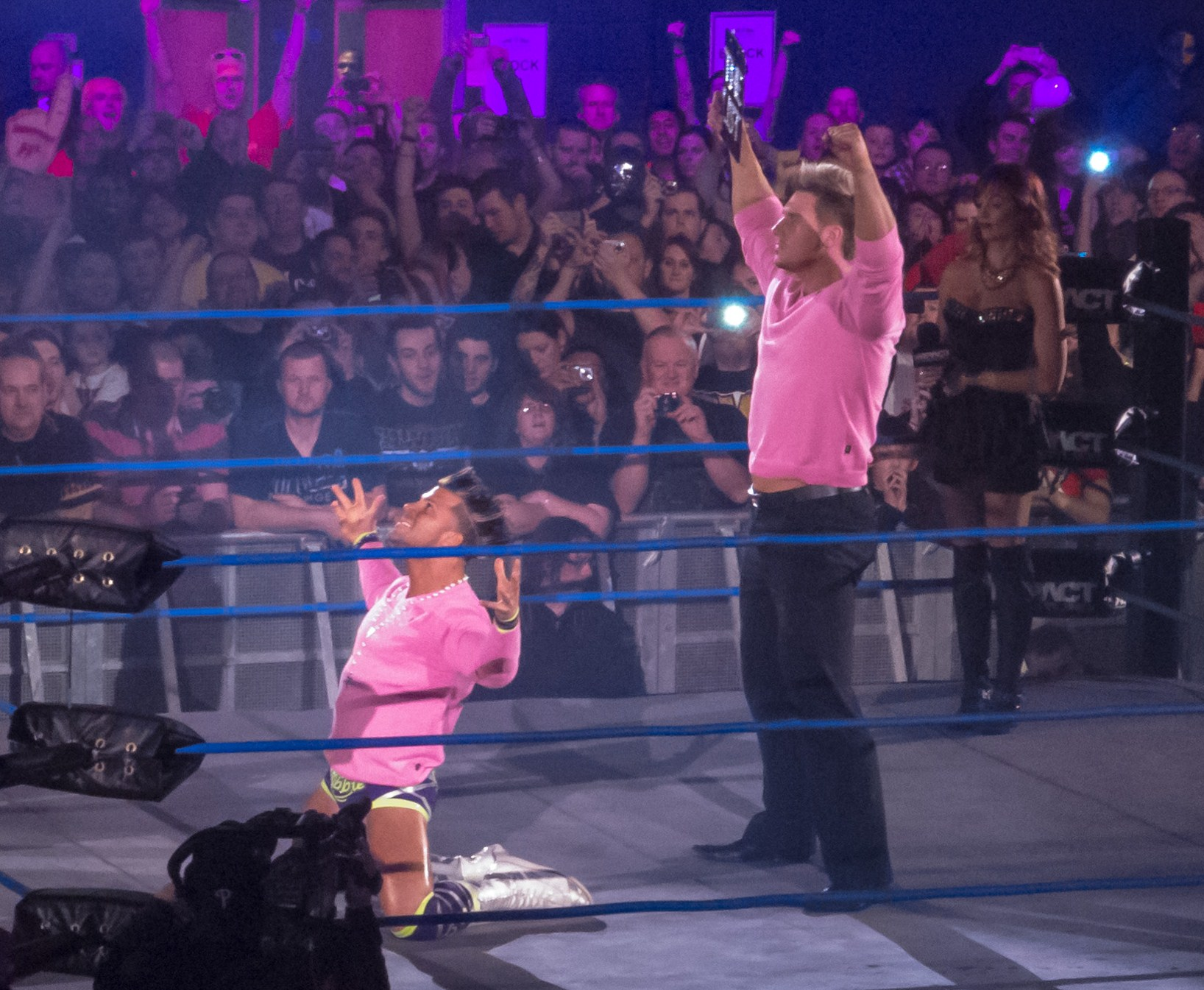
From 2011, Robbie E started an alliance with Robbie T as his enforcer

After Cookie's departure from TNA, Robbie E began looking for a new partner and, on the August 25 edition of Impact Wrestling, Robbie E made an offer to Rob Terry. On the September 8 edition of Impact Wrestling, Terry attacked Eric Young after his match with Robbie E, signifying a new alliance between the two. After losing another match against Young on the October 27 edition of Impact Wrestling, Robbie E and Terry, now dubbed "Robbie T", again attacked the Television Champion, which led to him announcing that he was going to bring another Jersey Shore cast member, Ronnie, to face the two the following week. After a confrontation, which led to Robbie E and Robbie T attacking Young and Ronnie, on the November 3 edition of Impact Wrestling, the two teams faced each other in a tag team match the following week, where Ronnie was able to pick up the win for his team by pinning Robbie E. On November 13 at Turning Point, Robbie E defeated Young to win the TNA Television Championship for the first time. He would go on to defend his title against Devon and Rob Van Dam on the November 17 and December 1 editions of Impact Wrestling. On December 11 at Final Resolution, Robbie E successfully defended the title against Young in a rematch. On February 12, 2012, at Against All Odds, Robbie E retained his title against Shannon Moore, who answered his open challenge. On the February 23 edition of Impact Wrestling, Robbie E was defeated by A.J. Styles via disqualification, following interference from Kazarian and Christopher Daniels; as a result Robbie E retained his title. On March 18 at Victory Road, Robbie E lost the Television Championship to Devon after Devon answered his open challenge. During the next two months, Robbie E made three unsuccessful attempts at regaining the Television Championship from Devon; first in a steel cage match on April 15 at Lockdown, then in a singles match on the May 3 episode of Impact Wrestling, and finally in a three-way match, also involving Robbie T, on May 13 at Sacrifice. Robbie E and Robbie T would continue their feud with Devon by attacking him during his title matches. On the June 7 episode of Impact Wrestling, Robbie E received another shot at Devon's Television Championship, but was defeated following outside interference from Garett Bischoff. Three days later at Slammiversary, Robbie E and Robbie T were defeated in a tag team match by Devon and Bischoff.

On the following episode of Impact Wrestling, Robbie E entered the 2012 Bound for Glory Series, taking part in the opening gauntlet match, from which he was eliminated by Samoa Joe. Robbie E ended his participation in the tournament on the August 23 episode of Impact Wrestling with a win over A.J. Styles and Rob Van Dam in a three-way match, finishing eleventh out of the twelve wrestlers in the tournament. On the October 18 episode of Impact Wrestling, Robbie E unsuccessfully challenged Samoa Joe for the TNA Television Championship. Going into 2013, tension began to be teased between the Robbies, with Robbie T constantly upstaging and defying Robbie E. On the February 28 episode of Impact Wrestling, the alliance between the Robbies ended with Robbie E, who was pretending to reconcile with Robbie T, hitting him over the head with his VIP sign before being chased off. The rivalry culminated in a singles match on March 10 at Lockdown, where Robbie T emerged victorious. On the following episode of Impact Wrestling, Robbie E was again defeated by Robbie T, now using his real name Rob Terry, in a rematch to end the feud.

==== The BroMans (2013–2015) ====
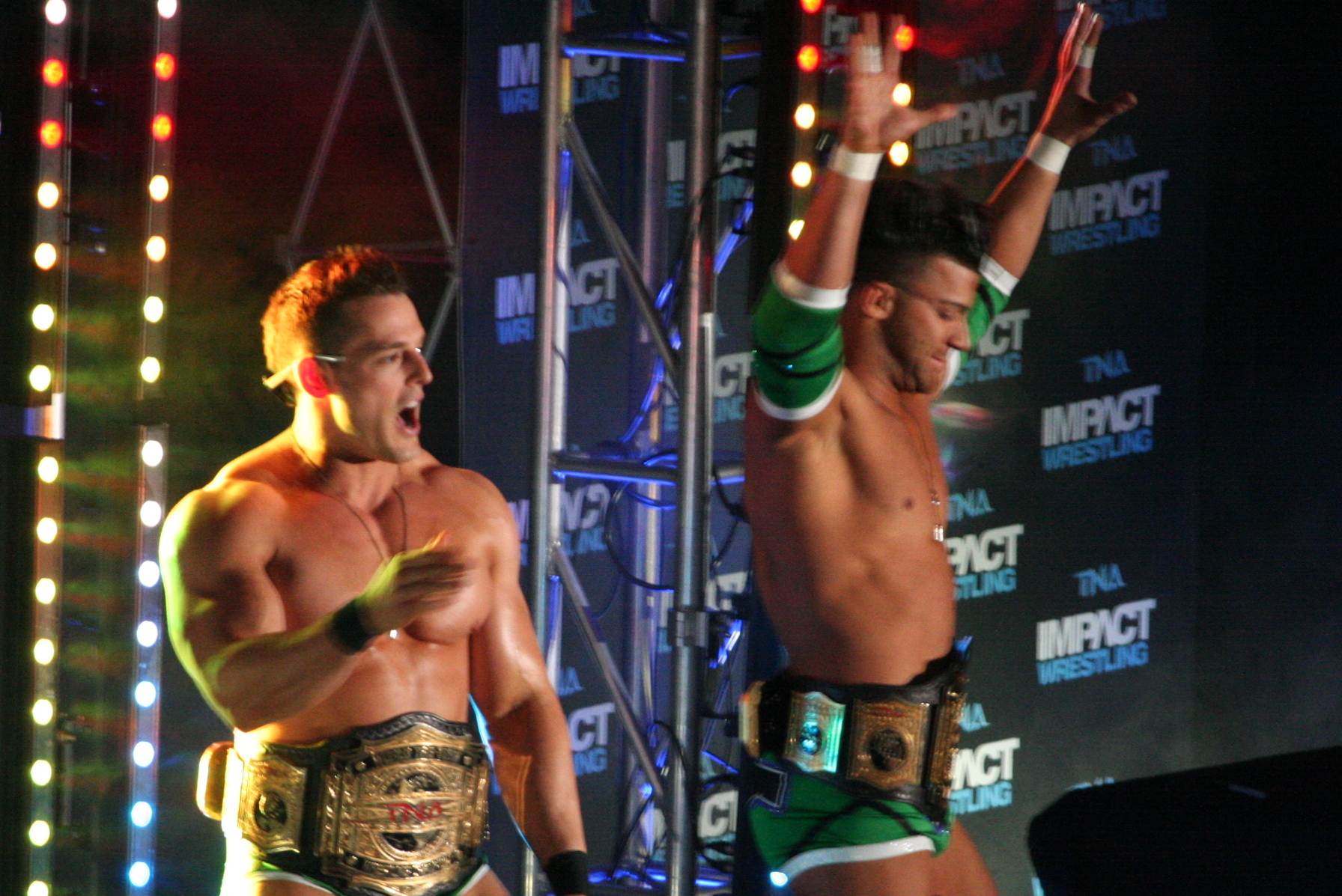
Robbie E with Jessie Godderz (left), as the TNA World Tag Team Champions in April 2014

Robbie started allying himself with Jessie Godderz on the May 2 episode of Impact Wrestling, where they teamed with Joey Ryan in a handicap match against Rob Terry, which the team lost after Robbie and Godderz walked out on Ryan and left him to be pinned. On the June 27 episode of Impact Wrestling, Robbie and Godderz, accompanied by Tara, confronted TNA World Tag Team Champions Gunner and James Storm and presented themselves as the BroMans. The following week, The BroMans were defeated by Gunner and Storm in a non-title match. On October 20, during the Bound for Glory pre-show, accompanied by "Mr. Olympia" Phil Heath, the BroMans won a four-way tag team gauntlet to become the number one contenders for the TNA World Tag Team Championship later in the night, where they defeated Gunner and Storm for the titles. The BroMans made their first televised title defense on the October 31 episode of Impact Wrestling, defeating Gunner and Storm in a rematch. On the November 28 Thanksgiving edition of Impact Wrestling, The BroMans won the first ever tag team turkey bowl match defeating Dewey Barnes and Norv Fernum, in the process forcing them to wear the annual turkey suits. BroMans lost the titles against The Wolves in a house show on February 23, 2014. They regained the title by defeating The Wolves and Team 246 (Kaz Hayashi and Shuji Kondo) at the Wrestle-1 Kaisen: Outbreak show in Tokyo, Japan on March 2. On April 27 at Sacrifice, The BroMans lost their titles to The Wolves in a 3 vs 2 handicap match with Zema Ion as their 3rd partner Robbie E began using Boom as his own. The BroMans would next pursue a feud with Knux and his new stable 'The Menagerie' stemming from Robbie's fear of clowns, which would prevent him from competing in matches. His fear would eventually become so intense he would be written off television to overcome his fear. Robbie returned to Impact Wrestling on the July 24 edition losing to The Great Muta.

On November 1, 2014, The BroMans (Robbie E and Godderz) along with DJZ were defeated by Team 246 with Minoru Tanaka during the Wrestle-1's Keiji Mutoh 30th Anniversary show. On January 23, 2015, episode of Impact Wrestling, Robbie E competed in the Feast or Fired match, during the match Velvet Sky assisted Robbie E by grabbing a feast or fired brief case but during the brief case reveal Robbie turned this around on Sky claiming that she should open the case since she was the one who originally retrieved it. Sky opened the brief case to containing the pink slip.

==== Various feuds (2015–2016) ====
On the April 17 episode of Impact Wrestling, after losing a tag team match to The Dirty Heels, Robbie E and Godderz got into a brawl. On the June 17 episode of Impact Wrestling, Robbie E turned face for the first time in his TNA career when he saved DJZ from Godderz. On June 28, 2015, at Slammiversary, he defeated his former BroMans partner Godderz. Robbie E would go on to face Godderz again in a street fight the following edition of Impact Wrestling which he lost. On the August 12 episode of Impact Wrestling, Robbie E competed in a King of the Mountain Match for the namesake championship (formerly the Television Championship) which he lost after being incapacitated from a piledriver by participant Eric Young. After Impact went off the air, Robbie E was examined for possible neck damage. During October and November (taped in July), Robbie E participated in the TNA World Title Series. defeating Eddie Edwards in his first match. However, he then lost singles matches to Matt Hardy and Davey Richards and thus finished in third place in his group, so he did not advance to the elimination rounds. Robbie E competed in the 2016 Feast or Fired match on January 26 but was unable to retrieve a briefcase.

==== The BroMans reunion (2016–2017) ====
On the March 22, 2016, episode of Impact Wrestling, Robbie E reunited with Jessie Godderz as fan favorites to face Beer Money for the TNA World Tag Team Championship, but were unsuccessful in winning the titles. At Slammiversary, Robbie E and Jessie Godderz fought Decay for the TNA World Tag Team Championship, in a losing effort.

In October, following Bound for Glory, the team quietly disbanded when Godderz went in a feud with Aron Rex for the Impact Grand Championship, and Robbie started comical segments with Grado in an attempt to introduce him in the BroMans. On the January 19 episode of Impact Wrestling, Robbie E and Swoggle lost to Aron Rex and Rockstar Spud. On the February 9 episode of Impact Wrestling, Robbie E lost to Rex in his final match for TNA. On September 29, Robbie E announced on Twitter that he had parted ways with Impact Wrestling.

=== Pro Wrestling Noah (2017) ===
On March 25, it was announced that Robbie E would be representing Impact Wrestling, alongside Bram for Pro Wrestling Noah's annual Global Tag League. In light of Bram's suspension from the tournament on April 26 due to controversial Instagram posts, Kazma Sakamoto took over for Bram for the remainder of the tournament.

=== Return to the independent circuit (2017–2018) ===
After Strauss decided to part ways with Global Force Wrestling he decided to return to the independent circuit. On April 6, 2017, Robbie E unsuccessfully challenged The Black Leopard for the IWL Heavyweight Championship in Petah Tikva, Israel at the Israeli Wrestling League's IWL XIV. At the end of 2018, Strauss retired the Robbie E character and performed under his real name.

=== Return to WWE (2019–present) ===
On March 11, 2019, it was reported that Strauss had signed with WWE and would be reporting to the WWE Performance Center. On March 21, he debuted at a NXT house show under his real name as a villainous manager, managing Rinku Singh and Saurav Gurjar. Shortly after his stable of clients grew to include Riddick Moss. He started appearing at house shows as the manager of The Outliers, a tag team consisting of Riddick Moss and Dan Matha. After 14 years not appearing on television since his SmackDown match in 2006, he made his re-debut as Robert Stone, on NXT, introducing Chelsea Green as his new client of his own stable the Robert Stone Brand.

On the May 27, 2020, episode of NXT, after Chelsea Green and Charlotte Flair defeated Rhea Ripley and Io Shirai, Green fired Stone. Over the next few weeks, Stone would appear on NXT with tattered clothes and unkempt hair after being fired by Green as he tried to recruit Rhea Ripley as his new client to no avail. On the June 17 episode of NXT, Stone would officially recruit Aliyah after he helped her defeat Xia Li. Stone and Aliyah would feud with Ripley as Ripley defeated Aliyah on the June 24 episode of NXT. The following week on Night 1 of NXT: The Great American Bash, Stone competed in his debut match alongside Aliyah against Ripley in a handicap match, with the stipulation that if Ripley lost then she would join the Robert Stone Brand, but they were defeated. On the July 22 episode of NXT, Stone officially recruited Mercedes Martinez into the Robert Stone Brand after she attacked Shotzi Blackheart. Martinez would later join Retribution stable and returned to NXT a year later. His name has since been changed to Mr. Stone and was the manager of Von Wagner alongside Sofia Cromwell until July 22, 2022, when Cromwell made her main roster debut as Maxxine Dupri on SmackDown.

In August 2023, Von Wagner turned face when he began opening up about his childhood struggles to Stone and subsequently began feuding with Bron Breakker who recently turned heel; this effectively turned Stone face as well. In April 2024, Wagner was released from WWE, effectively ending their partnership and Stone transitioned into a backstage producer. On the 2024 NXT Spring Breakin', Stone reunited with his friend Chelsea Green (who was once part of his "Robert Stone Brand" stable four years ago) during her interview segment, seemingly teasing a potential reunion between Green and Stone, with Fightful Select having reported that WWE creative made pitches to reunite both Green and Stone moving forward, although the idea never materialized on-screen. On the May 21 episode of NXT, Stone accompanied Dante Chen when he faced Lexis King in a match, which Chen won. However, the storyline was soon scrapped, and he has since become the assistant to NXT General Manager Ava alongside Stevie Turner. On March 5, Stone was named color commentator for WWE Evolve alongside Peter Rosenberg.

On February 3, 2026, Stone was appointed as the interim NXT general manager following Ava's departure from WWE. On February 17, Stone announced his departure from the Evolve commentary team to focus on being the interim general manager of NXT and was replaced by Blake Howard. He became the full-time NXT general manager on March 26.

=== Return to TNA (2025) ===
On the May 1st episode of Impact!, Stone returned to TNA with the debuting Victoria Crawford where he interrupted and informs Santino Marella that his actions as the company's director of authority were under review and in turn, Stone claimed that he and Crawford were now both deputy directors of authority and that Crawford would challenge Masha Slamovich for the TNA Knockouts World Championship at Under Siege which was made official following the segment.

== Other media ==
On November 10, 2012, Strauss, along with several other TNA workers, was featured in an episode of MTV's Made.

In 2014, Strauss and former TNA Knockout Brooke Adams participated in the 25th season of The Amazing Race. They survived until the middle part of the final leg of the race, where they were the eighth team to be eliminated and placed fourth.

Strauss participated in The Titan Games: Trials 2 (Season 1, Episode 3), that aired on January 10. He was defeated, in the first round by Bridger Buckley, in the event: Hammering Ram.

== Personal life ==
In 2011, Strauss married his longtime girlfriend Tara Sue Gally, until their divorce in 2013. Strauss and Gally remarried in 2015. Together, they have twin sons (born 2016).

== Filmography ==
Film
Year	Title	Role	Notes
2008	The Wrestler	Rob Eckos	

Television
Year	Title	Role	Notes
2012	Made	Robbie E	
2014	The Amazing Race	Robbie E	Season 25

== Championships and accomplishments ==
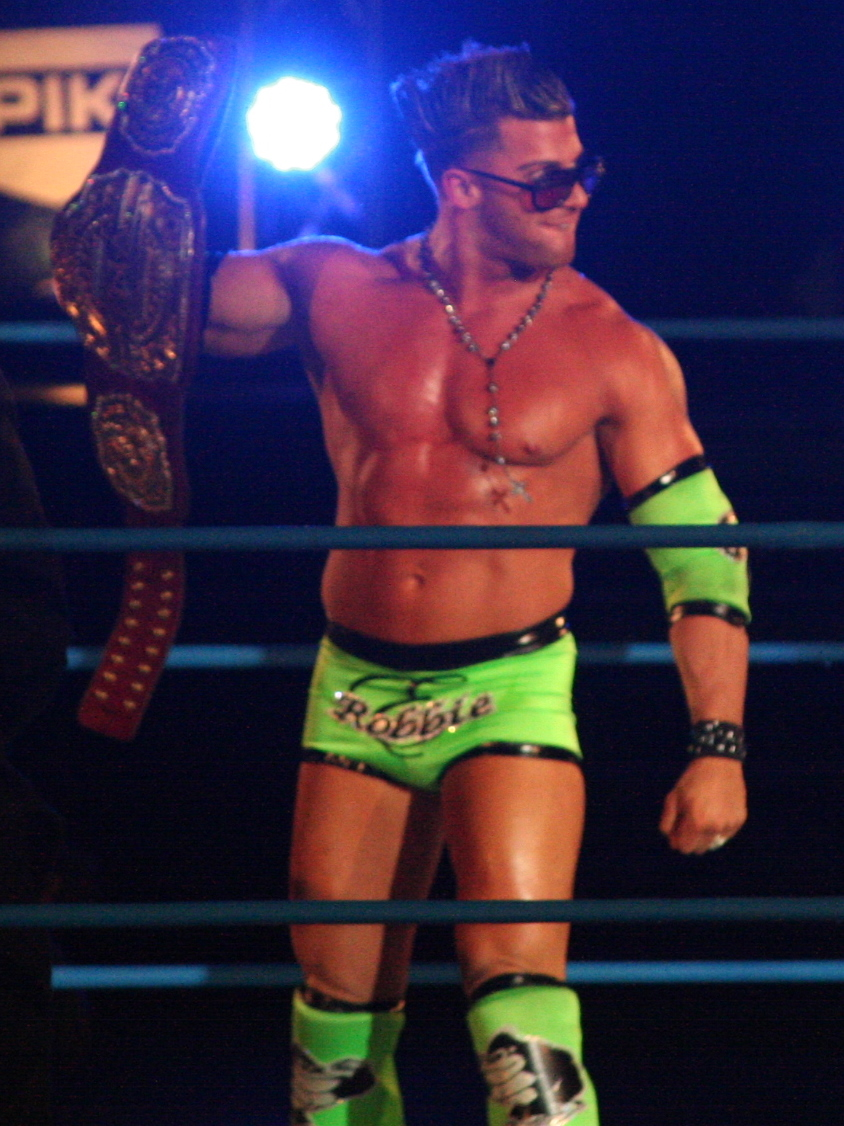
Robbie E is a former TNA Television Champion

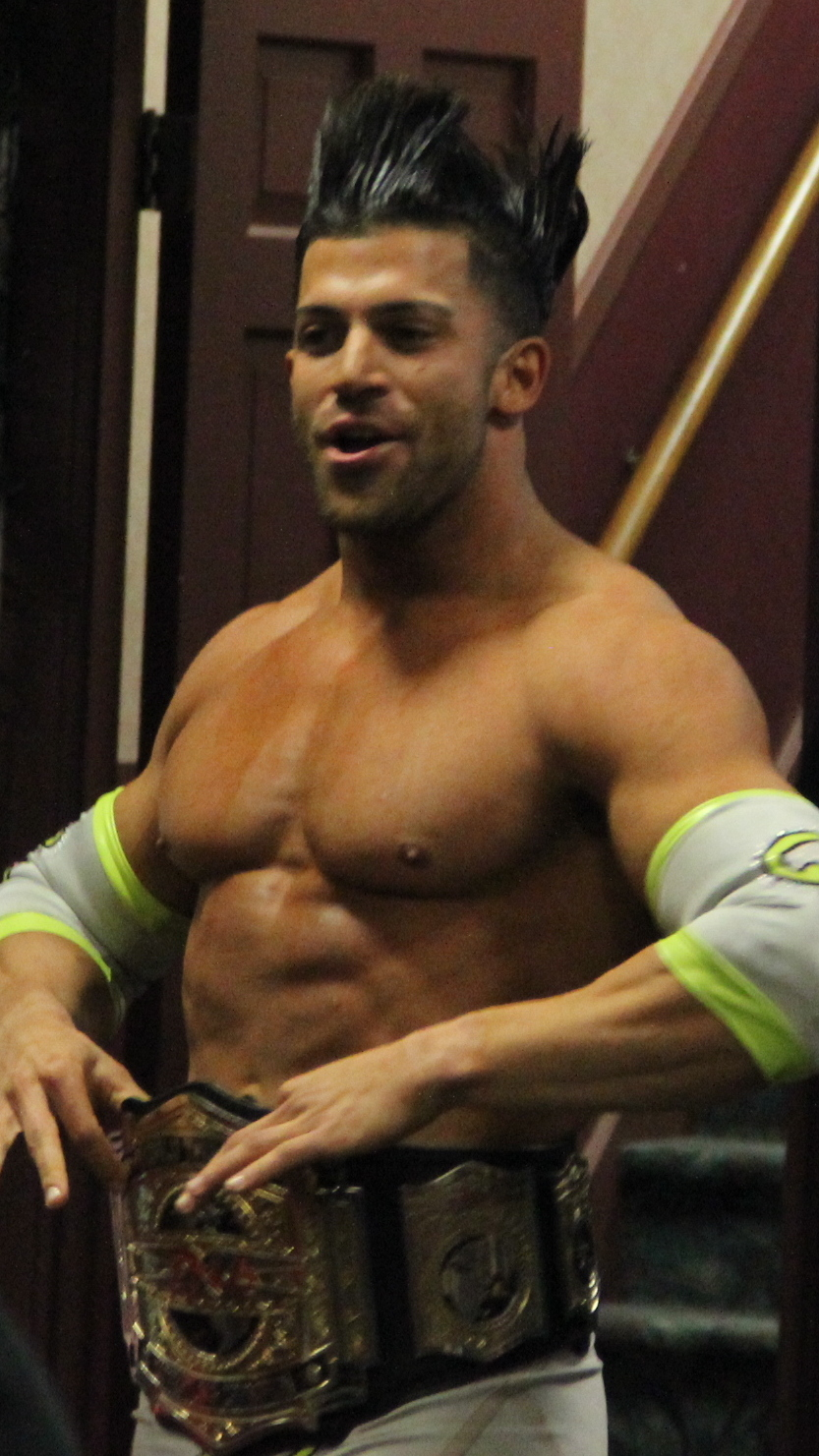
Together with Jessie Godderz, Robbie E has twice been TNA World Tag Team Champion

- Bigger Better Wrestling Federation
  - BBWF Tag Team Championship (1 time) – with Dan Ramm
- Chaotic Wrestling
  - Chaotic Wrestling Tag Team Championship (1 time) – with Billy Bax
- CyberSpace Wrestling Federation
  - CSWF Cruiserweight Championship (1 time)
- D2W Pro Wrestling
  - D2W Heavyweight Championship (1 time)
- DDT Pro-Wrestling
  - Ironman Heavymetalweight Championship (1 time)
- The Dynasty
  - Dynasty Heavyweight Championship (1 time)
- East Coast Wrestling Association
  - ECWA Mid Atlantic Championship (1 time)
  - ECWA Tag Team Championship (2 times) – with Billy Bax
  - ECWA Hall of Fame (Class of 2006)
- Great Lakes Championship Wrestling
  - GLCW Heavyweight Championship (1 time)
- Hardway Wrestling
  - HW Lightweight Championship (1 time)
- Independent Superstars of Professional Wrestling
  - ISPW Tri state Championship (1 time)
- Jersey Championship Wrestling
  - JCW Cruiserweight Championship (1 time)
- New York Wrestling Connection
  - NYWC Interstate Championship (1 time)
  - NYWC Tag Team Championship (1 time) – with Matt Striker
- Northeast Wrestling
  - NEW Tag Team Championship (1 time) – with Cam Zagami
- Pro Wrestling Illustrated
  - Ranked No. 66 of the 500 best singles wrestlers of the PWI 500 in 2012
- Pro Wrestling Pride
  - PWP Tag Team Championship (1 time) – with Danny Walsh
- Stars and Stripes Championship Wrestling
  - SSCW Heavyweight Championship (1 time)
  - SSCW Lightweight Championship (1 time)
- Total Nonstop Action Wrestling
  - TNA Television Championship (1 time)
  - TNA X Division Championship (1 time)
  - TNA World Tag Team Championship (2 times) – with Jessie Godderz
  - TNA Turkey Bowl (2013) – with Jessie Godderz
  - TNA Turkey Bowl (2016)
  - TNA X Division Championship #1 Contender Tournament (2011)
  - TNA World Cup (2016) – with Jeff Hardy, Eddie Edwards, Jessie Godderz and Jade
- Universal Independent Wrestling
  - UIW Heavyweight Championship (1 time)
- United Wrestling Coalition
  - UWC United States Championship (1 time)
- International Wrestling Alliance
  - IWA Tag Team Championship (1 time) – with Damian Adams
- Grim's Toy Show Wrestling
  - GTS YouTube Wrestling Figures Heavyweight Championship (3 times)
  - GTS Tag Team Championship (1 time) - with Grim
  - GTS United States Championship (1 time)
  - 16th GTS Triple Crown Champion
  - Christmas Chaos Winner (2016) - YouTube Wrestling Figures Heavyweight Championship
  - GTS Hall of Fame (2020)
