= NWA Shockwave Cruiser X Championship =

Professional wrestling championship

Details
- Promotion: NWA Shockwave
- Date established: October 29, 2002
- Date retired: 2006

Other names
- CSWF Cruiserweight Championship; CSWF Cruiser X Championship; NWA: Cyberspace Cruiser X Championship
Statistics
- First champion: Shawn Sheridan
- Final champion: Grim Reefer (won May 21, 2006)
- Most reigns: N/A
- Longest reign: Shawn Sheridan (329 days)
- Shortest reign: Rob Eckos (161 days)

The NWA Shockwave Cruiser X Championship was a professional wrestling X division cruiserweight championship in NWA Shockwave (NWA-SW) and the National Wrestling Alliance (NWA). It was the original title of the CyberSpace Wrestling Federation promotion and was later recognized by the NWA as a regional title. It was introduced as the CSWF Heavyweight Championship on October 19, 2002. It was established as an NWA heavyweight championship in 2005 following the promotion's admission into the NWA. The promotion became NWA: Cyberspace, and later NWA Shockwave, with the title remaining active until being discontinued in December 2006.

The inaugural champion was Shawn Sheridan, who defeated Morbius and Brian Fury in a three way match on October 19, 2002 to become the first CSWF Heavyweight Champion. He was also its longest reigning champion at 329 days. There were 6 officially recognized champions, however none held the belt more than once. Several then current wrestlers from Total Non-Stop Action held the title during its 5-year history including Michael Shane, Sonjay Dutt and Elix Skipper.

== Title history ==
#	Order in reign history
Reign	The reign number for the specific set of wrestlers listed
Event	The event in which the title was won
—	Used for vacated reigns so as not to count it as an official reign
N/A	The information is not available or is unknown
+	Indicates the current reign is changing daily

=== Names ===
Name	Years
CSWF Cruiserweight Championship	2002 — 2004
CSWF Cruiser X Championship	2004 — 2005
NWA: Cyberspace Cruiser X Championship	2005 — 2006
NWA Shockwave Cruiser X Championship	2006

=== Reigns ===
#	Wrestlers	Reign	Date	Days held	Location	Event	Notes	Ref.
1	Shawn Sheridan	1	October 19, 2002	329	Flemington, New Jersey	Halloween Horror (2002)	Sheridan defeated Morbius and Brian Fury in a three way match to become the first CSWF Cruiserweight Champion.	
2	Rob Eckos	1	September 13, 2003	N/A	Rahway, New Jersey	SummerBash (2003)		
—	Vacated	—	N/A	—	N/A	N/A	The championship is vacated when Eckos fails to appear for a scheduled title defence and is stripped as champion.	
3	Michael Shane	1	February 21, 2004	189	Wayne, New Jersey	SuperBrawl Saturday II (2004)	Defeated Dan Barry to win the vacant title. The title was renamed the CSWF Cruiser X Championship shortly afterwards.	
—	Vacated	—	August 28, 2004	—	Wayne, New Jersey	CyberCade (2004)	The championship is vacated when Shane abandoned the belt in a nearby garbage can following his victory over Grim Reefer in a lumberjack match.	
4	Sonjay Dutt	1	January 8, 2005	120	Wayne	Fatal Attraction (2005)	Awarded title via forfeit when Grim Reefer failed to appear. That same night, the title was renamed the NWA: Cyberspace Heavyweight Championship when the promotion joins the National Wrestling Alliance.	
5	Elix Skipper	1	August 21, 2005	273	Wayne	Cybercade 2 (2005)		
6	Grim Reefer	1	May 21, 2006	194	Flemington	Shockwave VII (2006)		
—	Deactivated	—	December 1, 2006	—	N/A	N/A	Title is discontinued when NWA Shockwave returns after a six-month hiatus following the death of founder Billy Firehawk.	

== List of combined reigns ==
<1	Indicates that the reign lasted less than one day.

Rank (Note: Each reign is ranked highest to lowest; reigns with the same number mean that they are tied for that certain rank.)	Wrestler	# of reigns	Combined days
1	Shawn Sheridan	1	329
2	Elix Skipper	1	273
3	Sonjay Dutt	1	225
4	Grim Reefer	1	194
5	Michael Shane	1	189
6	Rob Eckos	1	N/A

== See also ==
- List of National Wrestling Alliance championships
