= Elix Skipper =

American professional wrestler (born 1967)

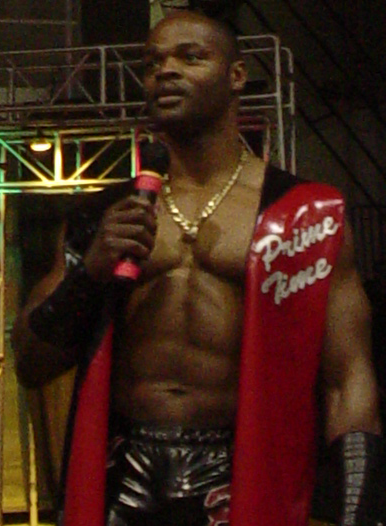
- Skipper in 2005

Personal information
- Born: December 15, 1967 (age 58) Roosevelt, New York, U.S.
- Children: 4

Professional wrestling career
- Ring name(s): Dark Guerrera; Elix Skipper; Extreme Blade; Prime Time; Skip Over
- Billed height: 6 ft 3 in (191 cm)
- Billed weight: 222 lb (101 kg)
- Trained by: WCW Power Plant
- Debut: 1998
- Retired: 2009

Elix Skipper (born December 15, 1967) is an American retired professional wrestler. He is best known for his appearances with World Championship Wrestling, where he was a one-time WCW Cruiserweight Champion and a one-time WCW Cruiserweight Tag Team Champion, and with NWA Total Nonstop Action, where he was a four-time NWA World Tag Team Champion.

== Early life ==
Skipper was born on December 15, 1967, in Roosevelt, New York. Before becoming a wrestler, Skipper participated in kickboxing. Upon deciding to become a wrestler, he resigned from his job as a store manager of McDonald's on Long Island and traveled to Atlanta, Georgia to audition at the WCW Power Plant, the professional wrestling school operated by World Championship Wrestling.

== Professional wrestling career ==
=== Early career (1998-1999) ===
Skipper made his professional wrestling debut for New Dimension Wrestling.

=== World Championship Wrestling (1999–2001) ===
Upon being accepted by the Power Plant, Skipper began his training in 1999. After training for eight months, Skipper made his television debut on an episode of Saturday Night. Seven months later, Skipper began wrestling on WCW Thunder and WCW Monday Nitro under the ring name "Skip Over", facing members of the cruiserweight division and fellow Power Plant graduates.

In August 2000, Skipper began performing under his real name while also adopting the nickname "Primetime". After interfering on behalf of Lance Storm in a bout between Storm and Mike Awesome on the August 14, 2000 episode of Nitro, Skipper was inducted into Storm's newly formed Team Canada faction. At the time Skipper joined Team Canada Storm was in possession of three of WCW's singles titles (the United States, Cruiserweight, and Hardcore titles) and had given them more Canadian-sounding names. As a reward for his actions Storm presented Skipper with the Cruiserweight Championship, which he had renamed the "101 Kilos and Under Title". Despite his American nationality and his self-professed lack of knowledge about Canada, Skipper was billed as being a Canadian and a former Canadian Football League player, complete with a Grey Cup ring. Skipper retained the 101 Kilograms and Under Championship until October 2, 2000, when Mike Sanders defeated him for the title and subsequently renamed it back to the Cruiserweight Championship. Throughout late 2000, Team Canada feuded with the Misfits In Action and the Filthy Animals.

In early 2001, Skipper left Team Canada and began competing principally in the cruiserweight division. Throughout February and March 2001, Skipper teamed with Kid Romeo in an eight-team tournament to determine the first holders of the newly created WCW Cruiserweight Tag Team Championship. Skipper and Romeo won the tournament by defeating Billy Kidman and Rey Mysterio in the tournament finals on March 18, 2001, at Greed, the final WCW pay-per-view event. On the March 26, 2001 episode of Nitro, Skipper and Romeo lost the Cruiserweight Tag Team Championship to Kidman and Mysterio.

In late March 2001, World Championship Wrestling was purchased by the World Wrestling Federation, with a number of wrestlers, including Skipper, being signed to developmental contracts.

=== World Wrestling Federation (2001) ===
Skipper made his debut early into the Invasion as a member of The Alliance. The WWF later assigned Skipper to the Heartland Wrestling Association, a WWF developmental territory. He trained in the HWA for nine months before being released in December 2001.

=== All Japan Pro Wrestling (2002-2003) ===
Upon being released from the WWF, Skipper contacted The Great Muta, a veteran Japanese wrestler who had previously invited Skipper to wrestle in Japan. Skipper subsequently travelled to Japan to perform for All Japan Pro Wrestling, where he wrestled while alternating between using his real name, the ring name "Dark Guerrera" and as the masked "Extreme Blade".

=== NWA Total Nonstop Action (2002–2006, 2007–2008) ===
==== Triple X (2002–2004) ====
Skipper joined NWA Total Nonstop Action upon its formation in June 2002, debuting under his real name on the third weekly TNA pay-per-view. Skipper competed in the X Division throughout 2002, at the same time continuing to wrestle in Japan. On the December 18, 2002 TNA pay-per-view, Skipper formed a three-man tag team known as Triple X with Low Ki and Christopher Daniels. On the same evening, Triple X joined Sports Entertainment Xtreme, a large villainous faction headed by Vince Russo.

Throughout the first half of 2003, Triple X feuded with America's Most Wanted (Chris Harris and James Storm), winning the NWA World Tag Team Championship on three occasions. In the course of their reigns, all three members of Triple X were recognised as champions and any two members of the team were eligible to defend the titles, similar to The Fabulous Freebirds. Triple X disbanded in mid-2003 when Low Ki left TNA to wrestle in Japan, and on June 25, 2003, America's Most Wanted defeated Skipper and Daniels in the first TNA steel cage match to conclude their feud.

Skipper left TNA in July 2003 as a result of a pay dispute, and performed in Japan until December 2003 when TNA offered him a new and more lucrative contract. Upon returning to TNA, Skipper took part in the America's X Cup Tournament and the World X Cup Tournament as a member of Team USA. Team USA won the World X Cup, but were defeated in the finals of the America's X Cup by Team Mexico.

In July 2004, Skipper and Daniels reformed Triple X and began feuding with America's Most Wanted once more. In the course of the feud, Skipper and Chris Harris were paired together against NWA World Tag Team Champions The Naturals after their respective partners became unavailable. Despite struggling to cooperate with one another, Skipper and Harris defeated The Naturals. They held the titles for several weeks before losing them to Christopher Daniels and James Storm. After Daniels and Storm lost the titles to Team Canada, the feud between Triple X and America's Most Wanted resumed. America's Most Wanted went on to defeat Triple X in a last team standing match on November 7, 2004, at Victory Road, with Skipper suffering a concussion in the course of the match. The feud culminated in a steel cage match on December 5, 2004, at Turning Point, with the stipulation that the losing team be forced to disband. America's Most Wanted won the match.

==== Diamonds in the Rough (2005–2007) ====
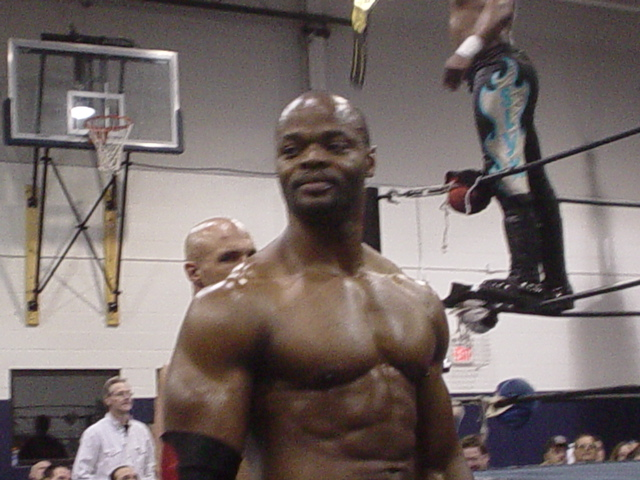
Skipper in 2005

After separating, Skipper and Daniels began feuding with one another, with Skipper unsuccessfully challenging Daniels for the TNA X Division Championship at Lockdown on April 24, 2005. Skipper went on to compete in the X Division until joining Simon Diamond's "Diamonds in the Rough" faction in August 2005, forming a tag team with David Young. The Diamonds in the Rough competed in the tag team division throughout 2005. In December 2005, the Diamonds in the Rough exchanged heated words with Major League Baseball catcher A. J. Pierzynski. Pierzynski gained his revenge on the Diamonds in the Rough by costing them a six-man tag team match at Turning Point on December 11, 2005.

The Diamonds in the Rough competed in the TNA tag team division throughout 2006, but received few high-profile matches. In February 2007, both Skipper and Young left TNA after requesting their releases.

==== Triple X reunion (2007–2008) ====
On July 15, 2007, at Victory Road, Skipper returned to TNA, competing in an Ultimate X match and reforming Triple X with Daniels and Senshi (the former Low Ki). On the July 19 episode of Impact!, Triple X won its return match against Serotonin. On the following Impact!, Daniels and Senshi won a match against Jay Lethal and Sonjay Dutt with some outside interference from Skipper. Triple X would go on to lose to The Latin American Xchange during Bound For Glory in an Ultimate X Match.

After Christopher Daniels was, in storyline, fired because of his briefcase from the "feast or fired" match containing a pink slip, Skipper reunited with Senshi. However, the tag team was short-lived, as Senshi requested and was granted his release in January. Following Senshi's departure, Skipper appeared sporadically before wrestling his last televised match in April, which he lost. He was released from his contract in May 2008.

=== Later career (2008-2009) ===
After being released from TNA, Skipper worked in the independent circuit. On August 29, 2008 he defeated Chick Donovan at NWA Prime Time in Columbus, Georgia. Then on December 13, 2008 he lost to Dennis Condrey for the vacated NWA Birmingham Heavyweight Championship in Graysville, Alabama. His last match was a loss to Tyler Black who later became known as Seth Rollins on January 9, 2009 at NWA No Limits in Iowa City, Iowa.

== Personal life ==
He has four children from two previous marriages (two daughters and two sons). His 22-year-old son, Lemarcus Skipper, was killed on April 29, 2009, by a gunman who was in his home.

== Championships and accomplishments ==
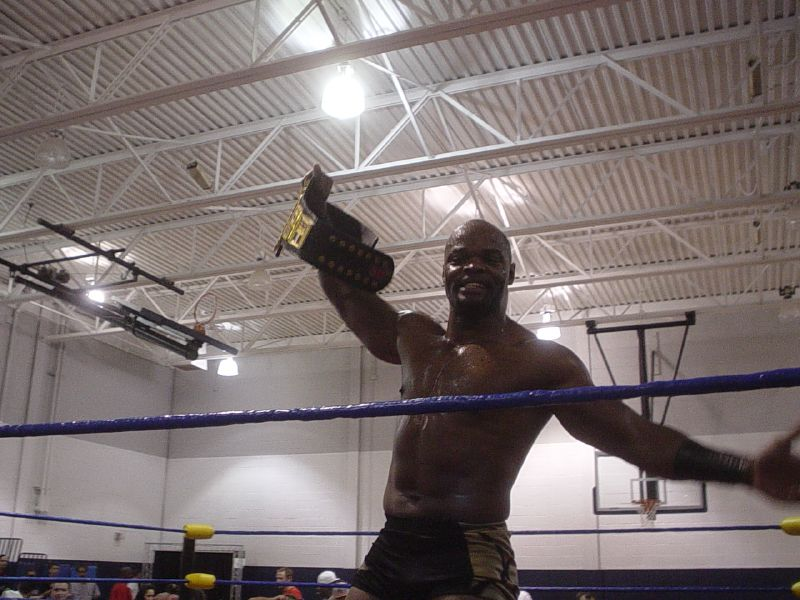
Skipper in 2005

- All Access Wrestling
  - AAW World Heavyweight Champion (1 time)
- Elite Championship Wrestling
  - ECW World Heavyweight Championship (1 time)
- Georgia Championship Wrestling / Great Championship Wrestling
  - GCW National Television Championship (1 time)
  - GCW Tag Team Championship (2 times) – with John Bogie (1) and David Young (1)^{1}
  - GCW United States Junior Heavyweight Championship (1 time)
- NWA Shockwave
  - NWA Shockwave Cruiser X Championship (1 time)
- NWA Total Nonstop Action
  - NWA World Tag Team Championship (4 times) – with Low Ki and Christopher Daniels (3)^{2} and Chris Harris (1)
  - TNA World Cup X (2004) – with Chris Sabin, Christopher Daniels and Jerry Lynn
  - TNA Year End Awards (2 times)
    - Match of the Year (2004) with Christopher Daniels vs. America's Most Wanted (Chris Harris and James Storm) at Turning Point
    - Memorable Moment of the Year (2004) Primetime walks the Six Sides of Steel at Turning Point
- NWA Wildside
  - NWA Wildside Junior Heavyweight Championship (1 time)
- NWA Wrestle Birmingham
  - NWA Alabama Tag Team Championship (1 time)^{1} – with Sonny Siaki / David Young
- Pro Wrestling Illustrated
  - Ranked No. 108 of the top 500 singles wrestlers in the PWI 500 in 2003
- USA Xtreme Wrestling
  - UXW X-treme Championship (1 time)
- World Championship Wrestling
  - WCW Cruiserweight Championship (1 time)
  - WCW Cruiserweight Tag Team Championship (1 time) – with Kid Romeo
  - WCW Cruiserweight Tag Team Championship Tournament (2001) – with Kid Romeo

^{1}After Siaki signed a contract with World Wrestling Entertainment, Skipper chose Young as a replacement without interrupting the championship reign.
^{2}Skipper defended the title with either Ki or Daniels as Triple X under the Freebird Rule.
