= WCW Cruiserweight Tag Team Championship =

Former professional wrestling title

Details
- Promotion: WCW
- Date established: March 18, 2001
- Date retired: March 26, 2001
Statistics
- First champions: Elix Skipper and Kid Romeo
- Final champions: The Filthy Animals; Billy Kidman and Rey Mysterio, Jr.
- Most reigns: All titleholders (1)
- Longest reign: Kid Romeo and Elix Skipper (8 days)
- Shortest reign: The Filthy Animals; Billy Kidman and Rey Mysterio, Jr. (<1 day)
- Oldest champion: Elix Skipper (33 years, 94 days)
- Youngest champion: Kid Romeo (26 years, 77 days)
- Heaviest champion: Kid Romeo and Elix Skipper (413 lb combined (Romeo 185 lb and Skipper 228 lb))
- Lightest champion: The Filthy Animals; Billy Kidman and Rey Mysterio, Jr. (360 lb combined (Kidman 195 lb and Mysterio, Jr. 165 lb))

The WCW Cruiserweight Tag Team Championship was a title created in 2001 just prior to World Championship Wrestling (WCW) being sold to the World Wrestling Federation (WWF, now WWE).

== History ==
The WCW Cruiserweight Championship and the matches contested for that title had long been a unique feature on WCW programming. With the number of cruiserweights signed, it was decided to expand the visibility of the division, and create a tag team title for the cruiserweights in February 2001. The title was retired when on March 26, 2001, WCW's assets were sold to the World Wrestling Federation (WWF, now WWE).

Nearly 15 years after this title was retired, WWE had planned to revive the cruiserweight tag team championship to complement its own singles championship, according to former WWE wrestler Gentleman Jack Gallagher, under its own banner for the Raw brand, but it never materialized. Another attempt for the cruiserweight tag team championship revival was planned in 2018 under the 205 Live brand but these plans also never came to fruition.

=== Tournament brackets ===
First round
Nitro (March 5)
Air Raid (Air Paris and Air Styles)	5:30
Kid Romeo and Elix Skipper	Pin
Thunder (February 26; aired on February 28)
The Jung Dragons (Yun Yang and Kaz Hayashi)	Pin
Mike Sanders and Kwee Wee	9:36
Nitro (February 26)
The Filthy Animals (Billy Kidman and Rey Mysterio Jr.)	Pin
Johnny Swinger and Jason Lee	5:14
Thunder (March 5; aired on March 7)
3 Count (Evan Karagias and Shannon Moore)	Pin
E. Z. Money and Scotty O	N/A

Semifinals
Nitro (March 12)
Romeo and Skipper	Pin
The Jung Dragons	5:03
Thunder (March 12; aired on March 14)
Filthy Animals	Pin
3 Count	9:57

Final
Greed (March 18)
Romeo and Skipper	Pin
Filthy Animals	13:46

== Reigns ==
Key
No.	Overall reign number
Reign	Reign number for the specific team—reign numbers for the individuals are in parentheses, if different
Days	Number of days held

No.	Champion	Championship change			Reign statistics		Notes	Ref.
No.	Champion	Date	Event	Location	Reign	Days	Notes	Ref.
1	Elix Skipper and Kid Romeo	March 18, 2001	Greed	Jacksonville, FL	1	8	Romeo and Skipper defeated The Filthy Animals (Billy Kidman and Rey Mysterio Jr.) in tournament final to become the inaugural champions.	
2	The Filthy Animals (Billy Kidman and Rey Mysterio Jr.)	March 26, 2001	WCW Monday Nitro	Panama City Beach, FL	1	0		
—		March 26, 2001	—	—			The World Wrestling Federation (WWF) purchased WCW and the Cruiserweight Tag Team Championship was abandoned.	

== See also ==
Cruiserweight-classed titles in WCW:

- WCW Cruiserweight Championship
- WCW Women's Cruiserweight Championship

Contemporary junior heavyweight tag team titles:

- WAR International Junior Heavyweight Tag Team Championship in Wrestle Association R
- IWGP Junior Heavyweight Tag Team Championship in New Japan Pro Wrestling
