= WCW Greed =

2001 World Championship Wrestling pay-per-view event

Greed
- Promotional poster featuring Scott Steiner
- Promotion: World Championship Wrestling
- Date: March 18, 2001
- City: Jacksonville, Florida
- Venue: Jacksonville Memorial Coliseum
- Attendance: 5,030
- Buy rate: 50,000
- Tagline: It's All or Nothin' Baby

Pay-per-view chronology
← Previous; SuperBrawl Revenge	Next → Final

Greed was the final professional wrestling pay-per-view (PPV) event produced by World Championship Wrestling (WCW). It took place on March 18, 2001 from the Jacksonville Memorial Coliseum in Jacksonville, Florida. Greed replaced the promotion's March PPV event Uncensored which was held from 1995 to 2000. The pay-per-view event took place three days before the final episode of Thunder and eight days before the final episode of Monday Nitro.

Ten matches were contested at the event. In the main event, Scott Steiner retained his WCW World Heavyweight Championship in a Falls Count Anywhere match against Diamond Dallas Page. On the undercard, Elix Skipper and Kid Romeo defeated The Filthy Animals (Billy Kidman and Rey Mysterio Jr.) to become the inaugural holders of the WCW Cruiserweight Tag Team Championship, Shane Helms defeated Chavo Guerrero Jr. to win the WCW Cruiserweight Championship, The Natural Born Thrillers (Chuck Palumbo and Sean O'Haire) retained the WCW World Tag Team Championship against Totally Buffed (Buff Bagwell and Lex Luger), and Booker T defeated Rick Steiner to win the WCW United States Heavyweight Championship.

As the final WCW PPV, WCW Greed was also the last WCW PPV of the Monday Night War era of September 4, 1995 to March 26, 2001, during which WWF Monday Night Raw (later WWF Raw Is War) and WCW Monday Nitro competed for ratings in a weekly Monday night time slot, which is now widely seen in retrospect as having been a "golden age" of pro wrestling, along with the 1980s boom.

== Storylines ==
The event featured wrestlers from pre-existing scripted feuds and storylines. Wrestlers portrayed villains, heroes, or less distinguishable characters in the scripted events that built tension and culminated in a wrestling match or series of matches.

The main feud heading into Greed was between Scott Steiner and Diamond Dallas Page over the WCW World Heavyweight Championship. At SuperBrawl Revenge, Steiner defeated Kevin Nash in a Retirement match to retain the World Heavyweight Championship and Nash was forced to retire. On the following night's episode of Monday Nitro, Steiner, alongside members of The Magnificent Seven, held a memorial service for Nash as well and listing down Superstars that Steiner defeated to retain his title. Steiner then revealed his next target to beat by revealing Kanyon out of a casket dressed as Diamond Dallas Page, with Kanyon having defeated Page at SuperBrawl Revenge the previous night. DDP then interrupted Steiner and accepted his challenge to a match at Greed with Steiner's title on the line. Later that night, DDP defeated Kanyon in a rematch before escaping through the crowd when Steiner attempted to attack him with a lead pipe.

== Event ==
Other on-screen personnel
Role:	Name:
Commentators	Tony Schiavone
Commentators	Scott Hudson
Referees	Scott Armstrong
Referees	Mark Johnson
Referees	Nick Patrick
Referees	Charles Robinson
Referees	Billy Silverman
Ring announcers	Michael Buffer (Main event)
Ring announcers	David Penzer

The third match was Bam Bam Bigelow versus Shawn Stasiak (with Stacy Keibler). While Shawn cuts a promo that involves kissing Stacy and throwing photos of himself to the crowd, Bigelow heads to the ring to confront him but Shawn goes outside numerous times to avoid being attacked. After some brawling, Shawn delivers a top-rope flying crossbody on Bigelow, who would later execute a diving headbutt on him. Stacy distracts the referee while giving Shawn some hairspray to blind Bigelow, followed by a neckbreaker he uses to gain the victory.

The fourth match was Team Canada (Lance Storm and Mike Awesome) versus Hugh Morrus and Konnan. As Storm asks for the Canadian national anthem to be played that doesn't happen, Morrus rushes to the ring and brawls with them to start the match. Morrus attempts to deliver a moonsault but Storm attacks him from behind and Awesome lands a frog splash on Morrus, only for Konnan to interrupt the pin and fight with Storm on the outside. Morrus tries to deliver the moonsault again but Storm distracts him long enough for Awesome to grab him for an Awesome Bomb to win the match.

The sixth match was contested between Totally Buffed (Buff Bagwell and Lex Luger) and The Natural Born Thrillers (Sean O'Haire and Chuck Palumbo) for the WCW World Tag Team Championship. Before the match started, Totally Buffed cut a promo saying they undermined their opponents but were now prepared to beat them. After a brief stare down, O'Haire and Palumbo rushed to the ring and brawled with them, with Bagwell holding O'Haire for a Luger attack he received instead. Palumbo and O'Haire performed Jungle Kicks and Seanton Bombs onto Totally Buffed, pinning them to win the match and retain their titles.

The eighth match was between Booker T and Rick Steiner for the WCW United States Heavyweight Championship. The match began as a brawl outside the ring, with Steiner in control after throwing Booker T into the crowd and back inside the ring to hit a Steiner-Line and double underhook powerbomb on him for consecutive two counts. After various rest holds, Booker T gains the upper hand with a flying forearm, scissor kick and faceplant on Steiner before performing a Spinaroonie, but hits the referee with a Harlem sidekick meant for Steiner who delivers a German suplex. As Steiner climbs to the top rope, Shane Douglas appears from the crowd and clocks him from behind with his cast, and Booker T executes a Book End on Steiner to win the match and the title.

== Aftermath ==
On March 23, 2001, World Wrestling Federation (WWF) owner Vince McMahon purchased WCW, acquiring the company's assets including television footage and some of the signed wrestlers’ contracts. Originally, former WCW president, Eric Bischoff, had been planning to purchase WCW with his media company in an attempt to save the company. The original idea Bischoff had was to do a complete rebranding and reboot WCW into a "new WCW", starting with a May pay per view titled "WCW: The Big Bang", which would have begun a new creative direction for WCW.

Monday Nitro aired its final episode on March 26, 2001 from Panama City Beach, Florida. In that episode, Scott Steiner lost the WCW World Heavyweight Championship to Booker T, who also held the WCW United States Heavyweight Championship at the time, making him a double champion. He would take the WCW World Heavyweight Championship to the WWF, where it was renamed the WCW Championship with Booker T as the inaugural champion.

Long time rivals Sting and Ric Flair faced each other for the last time in the main event of Nitro and the final match in WCW's history, in which Sting came out victorious after having Flair submit to the Scorpion Deathlock. After the match the two embraced, showing respect for one another.

Near the end of the episode, WWF owner Vince McMahon appeared on an episode of Raw is War (which was broadcast from Gund Arena in Cleveland, Ohio) to address the purchase of WCW; the entire address was simulcast on Nitro in order to allow McMahon to address the wrestlers and fans of both promotions. During McMahon's gloating, his son Shane McMahon arrived at the venue for Nitro and revealed that he was the one who purchased WCW. This was part of a storyline between Vince and Shane McMahon that would lead up to the WWF's Invasion storyline. It also served to help build up their match at WrestleMania X-Seven where the two were scheduled for a street fight.

While the WWF may have acquired most of WCW wrestlers’ contracts, some wrestlers, like Sting, would not join the WWF immediately after WCW's closure due to refusing to join the promotion or waiting out until their contract with AOL Time Warner expired.

Sting, despite being WCW's mainstay and face of the company, would resist joining the WWF (later renamed World Wrestling Entertainment and currently known simply as WWE) despite many close agreements on joining the promotion. He would eventually join WWE in 2014, 13 years after WCW's closure and debuted during the promotion's Survivor Series event while at the age of 55.

Despite his contract, Jeff Jarrett was fired by Vince McMahon upon his acquisition of WCW, McMahon having no interest in working with Jarrett due to the latter's contentious departure following No Mercy in 1999. After WCW closed its doors, Jarrett found success alongside his father Jerry as wrestling promoters by starting their own company, Total Nonstop Action Wrestling (TNA) (later renamed Impact Wrestling after its television program, before reverting to the TNA name in early 2024). The promotion brought a new generation of wrestlers to the public eye who later found success in WWE, while also hiring former WCW wrestlers like Sting and Scott Steiner. Jarrett returned to WWE in 2018 when he was inducted into the company's Hall of Fame, followed by an in-ring return for WWE at the following year's Royal Rumble.

Eighteen years later, the start-up All Elite Wrestling (AEW) promotion, which was co-founded by Cody Rhodes, the son of former WCW wrestler Dusty Rhodes, began airing three of its television programs (Dynamite, Rampage and Collision) on the former broadcasters of WCW, TNT and TBS.

== Reception ==
In 2018, Kevin Pantoja of 411Mania gave the event a rating of 7.0 [Good], stating, "I ended up liking this Pay-Per-View way more than expected. There are several good matches, including the opener and the main event. The WCW Tag Title match was easily the last great WCW match and it’s interesting to see how well most of this was booked. WCW was clearly headed for something better in 2001. The Tag Title squash worked wonderfully, the Dusty tag was entertaining, and I dug the Cruiserweight Title match. A good show with some high quality booking decisions."

== Results ==
No.	Results	Stipulations	Times
1	Jason Jett defeated Kwee Wee by pinfall	Singles match	12:17
2	Elix Skipper and Kid Romeo defeated The Filthy Animals (Billy Kidman and Rey Mysterio Jr.) by pinfall	Tag team match for the inaugural WCW Cruiserweight Tag Team Championship	13:46
3	Shawn Stasiak (with Stacy Keibler) defeated Bam Bam Bigelow by pinfall	Singles match	06:00
4	Team Canada (Lance Storm and Mike Awesome) defeated Hugh Morrus and Konnan by pinfall	Tag team match	11:28
5	Shane Helms defeated Chavo Guerrero Jr. (c) by pinfall	Singles match for the WCW Cruiserweight Championship	13:57
6	The Natural Born Thrillers (Sean O'Haire and Chuck Palumbo) (c) defeated Totally Buffed (Lex Luger and Buff Bagwell) by pinfall	Tag team match for the WCW World Tag Team Championship	00:54
7	Ernest Miller (with Ms. Jones) defeated Kanyon by pinfall	Singles match	10:31
8	Booker T defeated Rick Steiner (c) by pinfall	Singles match for the WCW United States Heavyweight Championship	07:31
9	Dustin and Dusty Rhodes defeated Ric Flair and Jeff Jarrett by pinfall	Tag team match	09:58
10	Scott Steiner (c) (with Midajah) defeated Diamond Dallas Page by technical submission	Falls Count Anywhere match for the WCW World Heavyweight Championship	14:14
(c) / – the champion(s) heading into the match
