= Billy Kidman =

American professional wrestler (born 1974)

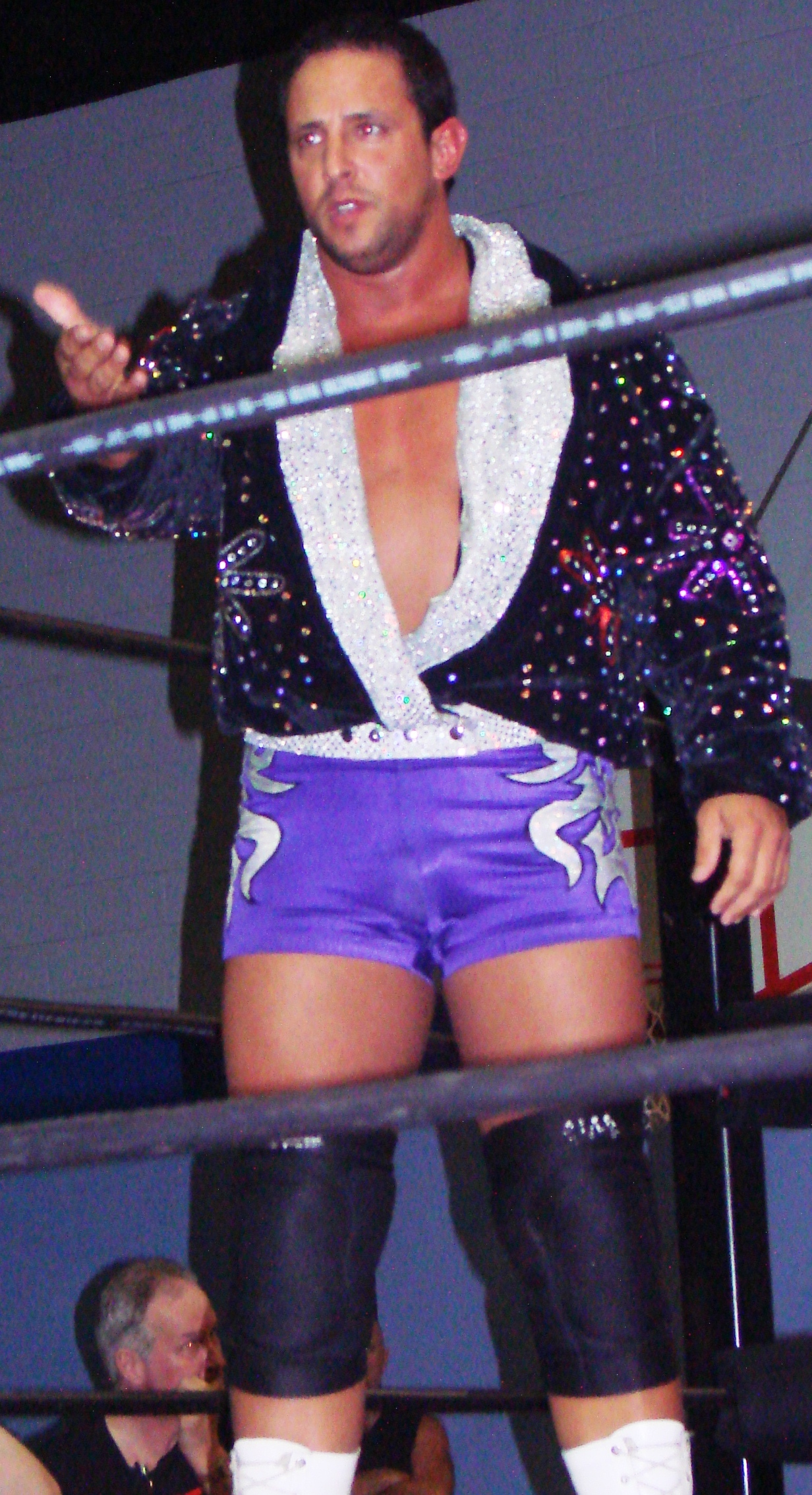
- Kidman in 2007

Personal information
- Born: Peter Alan Gruner Jr. May 11, 1974 (age 52) New Haven, Connecticut, U.S.
- Spouse: Torrie Wilson (m. 2003; div. 2008)

Professional wrestling career
- Ring name(s): Billy Kidman; Kid Flash; Kidman; Dr. Weisenburg; El Técnico
- Billed height: 5 ft 10 in (178 cm)
- Billed weight: 195 lb (88 kg)
- Billed from: Allentown, Pennsylvania
- Trained by: Afa Anoa'i
- Debut: September 11, 1994
- Retired: February 23, 2008

Peter Alan Gruner Jr. (born May 11, 1974) is an American retired professional wrestler, better known by his ring name Billy Kidman. He works for WWE, where he is a producer.

As a wrestler, Kidman is best known for his work with World Championship Wrestling (WCW) and World Wrestling Federation / Entertainment (WWF/E) throughout the late 1990s and early 2000s. While in WCW, Kidman gained fame as a key member of several stables. In addition to being a member of Raven's Flock, he also was a member of The Filthy Animals and later The New Blood. As a member of these stables, Kidman participated in memorable feuds with top WCW names, including Hulk Hogan, Jeff Jarrett, and Rey Mysterio Kidman also found championship success while in WCW, where he became a three time Cruiserweight Champion, a two time World Tag Team Champion, once with Mysterio Jr. and once with Konnan, and in the Cruiserweight Tag Team Champion final with Mysterio Jr.

Upon WCW's purchase by the World Wrestling Federation, Kidman became a member of the WCW/ECW Alliance. During his time in the WWF (later renamed to World Wrestling Entertainment), Kidman once again found success upon winning the Cruiserweight Championship an additional four times while the title was under the WCW banner and later the WWF/E banner, in addition to winning WWE's Tag Team Championship once with Paul London.

== Early life and education ==
Gruner grew up in Allentown, Pennsylvania in the Lehigh Valley region of eastern Pennsylvania, where he graduated from Parkland High School. Gruner was a banker before he started training to be a professional wrestler and was good friends with fellow professional wrestler Chris Kanyon, who he met at the Wild Samoan training center in Pennsylvania. He is a cousin of fellow professional wrestler Mikey Batts.

== Professional wrestling career ==
=== Early career (1994–1996) ===
Gruner was trained by Afa Anoaʻi, one half of The Wild Samoans, and wrestled his first match on September 11, 1994 in Hellertown, Pennsylvania against "Wild Thing" Dan Kallis on the independent circuit as Kid Flash. He formed a tag team with Ace Darling known as The Shooting Stars, and they would find success by winning the ECWA Tag Team Championship.

=== World Championship Wrestling (1996–2001) ===
==== Early appearances (1996–1997) ====
Gruner started wrestling for World Championship Wrestling on March 6, 1996 as "Kid Flash" against Chris Kanyon in a losing effort. Gruner then competed as Billy Cannon on April 10, before settling on the name Billy Kidman on May 13. He made his televised debut in WCW on the May 18 episode of Saturday Night, competing against Diamond Dallas Page in a losing effort. He mainly competed as an enhancement talent for over a year with no character. His first televised win occurred on the July 28 episode of WorldWide against Psychosis. Kidman received his first title opportunity in WCW, unsuccessfully challenging Rey Misterio Jr. for the World Cruiserweight Championship on the September 9 episode of Monday Nitro.

On the September 30 episode of Nitro, Kidman filled in for Psychosis, who could not show up due to his visa issues and competed as the masked "El Technico" by teaming with Juventud Guerrera against The Public Enemy in a losing effort. Kidman would receive two more title shots for the World Cruiserweight Championship, this time against Dean Malenko on the December 2 episode of Nitro and the December 14 episode of Saturday Night but lost both times.

==== The Flock (1997–1998) ====
On the October 13, 1997 episode of Nitro, Kidman was added to Raven's Flock. To fit in with the Flock's gimmick of being outcasts, Kidman was given the gimmick of a heroin addict, where he constantly scratched his arms and named his shooting star press, the Seven Year Itch. Kidman found little personal success with the group and competed in major matches only on a few occasions, such as participating in a battle royal to determine the #1 contender for the Cruiserweight Championship in his pay-per-view debut at Slamboree. Kidman would then lose to Juventud Guerrera at Bash at the Beach. At Fall Brawl, Kidman aided Perry Saturn in defeating Flock's leader Raven in a match, thus disbanding the group.

==== Cruiserweight Champion (1998–1999) ====
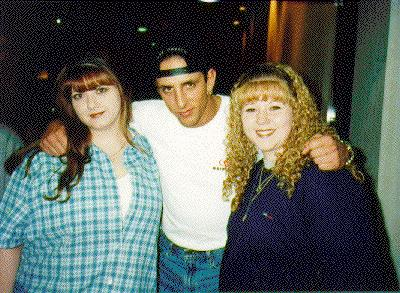
Kidman (center) with two fans in May 1999

Following the Flock's disbanding, Kidman shed his grungy attire and heroin gimmick and began performing as a clean-cut fan favorite before eventually defeating Juventud Guerrera to win his first Cruiserweight Championship on the September 14 episode of Nitro. Kidman retained the title against various cruiserweights on a weekly basis, with his first pay-per-view title defense occurring against Disco Inferno at Halloween Havoc, where Kidman retained. Kidman lost the title back to Guerrera on the November 16 episode of Nitro but regained it in a rematch at World War 3 in Auburn Hills, Michigan. Shortly after, Kidman joined Rey Mysterio, Jr. in the latter's rivalry with the Latino World Order. At Starrcade, Kidman successfully defended the Cruiserweight Championship against Guerrera and Mysterio in a triangle match. LWO leader Eddie Guerrero challenged Kidman to an immediate title match afterwards, which Kidman accepted. Kidman retained the title after assistance by Mysterio.

Kidman's title reign continued into 1999 with a successful title defense against Guerrera, Psychosis and Mysterio in a four-way match at Souled Out. Kidman then retained the title against various challengers such as Chavo Guerrero Jr. at SuperBrawl IX and Mikey Whipwreck at Uncensored, before losing the title to Mysterio on the March 15 episode of Nitro. Following this, Mysterio asked Kidman to be his tag team partner in a match for the World Tag Team Championship. Kidman at first declined, as a previous attempt at a tag team between the two did not reach any level of success. The two, however, faced Chris Benoit and Dean Malenko for the titles on the March 29 episode of Nitro, and succeeded with unwanted aid from Raven and Saturn. Kidman then faced off against Mysterio in an attempt to win back the Cruiserweight Championship at Spring Stampede, however, Mysterio retained his title.

The three teams feuded for several weeks, which ended in a three-way tag team match for the World Tag Team Championship at Slamboree. Chris Kanyon's interference led to the victory for Raven and Saturn. Kidman spent the next several months in assorted feuds.

==== Filthy Animals (1999–2001) ====
In the summer of 1999, Kidman joined Filthy Animals alongside Rey Mysterio, Konnan, and Eddie Guerrero. Initially joining together to combat Dead Pool, Filthy Animals defeated the Dead Pool twice at Road Wild and Fall Brawl. Kidman would then become responsible for unmasking Psychosis by defeating him in a hair vs. mask match on the September 27 episode of Nitro. At Halloween Havoc, Kidman substituted for an injured Mysterio and teamed with Konnan to defend the World Tag Team Championship against Harlem Heat and The First Family in a triangle match, which Harlem Heat won. However, the following night on Nitro, Kidman and Konnan defeated Harlem Heat to win the titles, beginning Kidman's second tag team title win in WCW.

Kidman then participated in a tournament for the vacant WCW World Heavyweight Championship, defeating Konnan in the first round and Norman Smiley in a hardcore match in the second round before losing to eventual winner Bret Hart in the quarter-final round. Filthy Animals then lost an intergender elimination match to The Revolution at Mayhem. The following night, on Nitro, Kidman teamed with Konnan's substitute Rey Mysterio to defend the World Tag Team Championship against Creative Control. Filthy Animals went on to lose the titles. Kidman would challenge Jeff Jarrett for the United States Heavyweight Championship on the December 27 episode of Nitro. He came close to winning the title but ended up losing the match.

Filthy Animals began to crumble in 2000 when Guerrero left WCW, and Kidman left the stable when the rest of its members turned heel. At Souled Out, Kidman participated in the Triple Threat Theater, a series of three matches with different stipulations, initially scheduled between Chris Benoit and Jeff Jarrett. However, Jarrett was unable to compete due to his injury. Kidman won the first two matches, a Catch-as-Catch Can match against Dean Malenko, and a Bunkhouse Brawl against Perry Saturn, but lost the third match, a Caged Heat match against The Wall. This resulted in Kidman feuding with Wall and Vampiro over the next few weeks, culminating with Kidman defeating Vampiro in a match at SuperBrawl 2000. Following that, Kidman joined forces with Booker to feud with Harlem Heat 2000, defeating them at Uncensored. On March 30, Kidman defeated The Artist at a house show to win his third Cruiserweight Championship, but lost the title back to Artist a day later.

In April, Kidman joined Vince Russo's New Blood stable, signalling another heel turn. At Spring Stampede, Kidman participated in a tournament for the vacant United States Heavyweight Championship, losing to Vampiro in the quarter-final round. Reflecting the gimmick of the New Blood, Kidman began acting as hotshot who refused to be held back by wrestlers beyond their prime. This led to the biggest feud of his career with Hulk Hogan, including a pinfall victory over Hogan in a handicap match. However, the rivalry concluded with back-to-back matches for Kidman against Hogan at Slamboree and The Great American Bash. The New Blood would then split up, leading Kidman to turn face as he entered a feud with Shane Douglas for the affection of his on-screen girlfriend Torrie Wilson. During the feud, Wilson turned on Kidman. Kidman was legitimately injured in a strap match at New Blood Rising, when Douglas hung Kidman from the neck using the strap. Despite winning the match, Kidman was forced to take several weeks off to recover. At Fall Brawl, Kidman and Madusa lost to Douglas and Wilson in a scaffold match.

Following the feud, Kidman began teaming with Mysterio Jr. again, thus joining Filthy Animals once again. At Halloween Havoc, Kidman and Mysterio failed to win the World Tag Team Championship from Mark Jindrak and Sean O'Haire in a triangle match, also involving The Boogie Knights. The duo then began feuding with KroniK after losing to them at Millennium Final. At Mayhem, Filthy Animals defeated Alex Wright and KroniK in a handicap match after KroniK abandoned Wright. Filthy Animals' next rivalry was against Jeff Jarrett and The Harris Brothers, losing to them in a street fight at Starrcade. They were also on the losing end against Team Canada in a penalty box match at Sin.

In the spring of 2001, Kidman and Mysterio entered the Cruiserweight Tag Team Championship tournament, defeating Jason Lee and Johnny Swinger in the quarterfinals and 3 Count in the semifinals but lost in the finals to Elix Skipper and Kid Romeo at Greed. On the final episode of Nitro, Kidman and Mysterio Jr. won the titles from Skipper and Romeo. That night, the World Wrestling Federation (WWF) purchased WCW and Kidman's contract was picked up by the WWF. As a result, Kidman and Mysterio ended up as the final Cruiserweight Tag Team Champions in WCW history.

=== World Wrestling Federation / World Wrestling Entertainment (2001–2005) ===
==== The Invasion; Cruiserweight Championship pursuit (2001–2003) ====
When the WWF purchased WCW, the contract of Gruner (who was still wrestling as Billy Kidman) was one of twenty-five involved in the purchase. When The Invasion commenced, Gruner appeared on WWF television under his Billy Kidman ring name as a tweener for The Alliance. Kidman debuted in WWF on the July 5 episode of SmackDown!, competing in the first televised WCW match on the weekly program. Kidman defeated Gregory Helms to win the WCW Cruiserweight Championship in his WWF debut. As the WCW Cruiserweight Champion, Kidman proceeded to defeat the WWF Light Heavyweight Champion X-Pac at Invasion. On the July 30 episode of Raw is War, Kidman lost the Cruiserweight Championship to X-Pac in a title versus title match, with X-Pac's Light Heavyweight Championship also on the line. After this, Kidman was later sidelined with an injury during the Invasion angle and thus did not have as big of an impact as other WCW wrestlers.

After recovering from his injury, Kidman returned to WWF in October. On the October 11 episode of SmackDown!, Kidman defeated X-Pac to win his record-tying fifth Cruiserweight Championship. He lost the title to Tajiri on the October 22 episode of Raw is War. At Survivor Series, Kidman participated in the Immunity battle royal, where the winner would receive immunity from being fired. Kidman failed to win the match, and Alliance lost later that night, thus being forced to disband. As a result, all Alliance members were fired in storyline, and Kidman was taken off television, competing at house shows for the next four months.

Kidman returned to WWF television after being drafted to the SmackDown! brand as part of the brand extension on March 25, 2002. Kidman's return match took place on the March 30 episode of Jakked, where he teamed with The Hurricane against Funaki and Tajiri in a losing effort. On the April 4 episode of SmackDown!, Kidman defeated Tajiri to win his record-breaking sixth Cruiserweight Championship. However, Tajiri reclaimed the title at Backlash. Kidman continued to feud with Tajiri over the title, wrestling him on various occasions but failed to regain the title. After losing in a #1 contender's match to Jamie Noble on the June 20 episode of SmackDown!, Kidman began feuding with Noble over the title, unsuccessfully challenging him at Vengeance.

At Rebellion, Kidman and his real-life girlfriend Torrie Wilson defeated John Cena and Dawn Marie in an intergender tag team match. After this, he went on to win his record-breaking seventh Cruiserweight Championship after defeating Jamie Noble at Survivor Series. He later lost the title three months later to Matt Hardy at No Way Out.

==== Teaming and feuding with Paul London (2004–2005) ====
Following the title loss, Kidman proceeded to spend the next few years as a cornerstone of the cruiserweight division before forming a tag team with newcomer Paul London in early 2004. Together, they slowly worked their way up the tag team ranks before ultimately winning the WWE Tag Team Championship from the Dudley Boyz on the July 8, 2004 episode of SmackDown!. Proving the win was not an upset, they went on to defeat the Dudley Boyz in a rematch for the title.

Their championship run came to an abrupt end after Kidman turned his back on London. The heel turn played off of a legitimate injury which occurred on the August 26, 2004 episode of SmackDown!, when Kidman's shooting star press unintentionally caused Chavo Guerrero to suffer a concussion. The next week, Kidman was on the top rope ready to hit the shooting star press, but hesitated, climbed down the turnbuckles, and slowly walked backstage overwhelmed with guilt after injuring Guerrero. London was left alone to defend the title against Kenzo Suzuki and René Duprée, and was easily defeated. As a result, London and Kidman faced each other at No Mercy, where Kidman defeated London before performing the shooting star press on London while he was strapped to a stretcher. This completed Kidman's heel turn, as he proceeded to blame the fans for wanting him to be more brutal with his in-ring style. Kidman and Guerrero ended their feud upon Chavo's return, the latter being victorious in the final match. Kidman then competed against London over the Cruiserweight Championship in the coming months. At the start of 2005, Kidman suffered a broken orbital bone, which sidelined him for three months.

Gruner was released from his WWE contract on July 6, 2005. Gruner stated that the release was due to an argument with management over their decision to stop booking wrestlers on first class flights overseas.

=== Independent circuit (2005–2007) ===
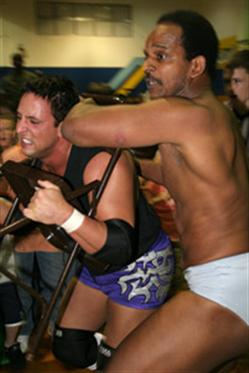
Kidman wrestling Norman Smiley at the ICW in January 2007

Following his departure from WWE, Kidman began touring the United Kingdom. During the tour, he competed for the Frontier Wrestling Alliance in a three-way match with Jody Fleisch and Jonny Storm. He also wrestled British wrestling legend Robbie Brookside in a losing effort to determine the inaugural Real Quality Wrestling Heavyweight Champion.

In 2007, Kidman made his International Wrestling Association debut in a match for the IWA World Heavyweight Championship against Ray González, which he lost. Kidman also took part in the East Coast Australian International Assault II Tour from June 1–3, 2007, where he competed against Australian wrestlers TNT and Mark Hilton before defeating Bryan Danielson to win the WSW World Heavyweight Championship on the third night in Newcastle.

On July 8, 2007, Kidman teamed up with Sean Waltman as part of a triple threat match in McAllen, Texas to crown the new NWA World Tag Team Champions. The title was previously vacated by Team 3D after Total Nonstop Action Wrestling officially pulled out of the National Wrestling Alliance. However, Kidman and Waltman lost the match to Karl Anderson and Joey Ryan.

=== Return to WWE (2007–present) ===
Kidman returned to WWE in 2007, helping train upcoming wrestlers in its then developmental territory Florida Championship Wrestling throughout 2007 and 2008. On February 23, 2008, he wrestled his last match, losing to Afa Jr. Gruner was rehired by World Wrestling Entertainment in 2010 as a producer. On September 21, 2011, WWE ran a story on their website about Gruner and his role as a producer.

On April 9, 2012, Gruner along with former wrestlers Jamie Noble, Goldust and other officials and WWE wrestlers broke up the brawl between John Cena and Brock Lesnar. In November 2013, Gruner appeared on WWE's European tour as Paul Heyman's doctor, under the name of "Dr. Weisenburg". On August 23, 2016 episode of SmackDown Live, he appeared along with Jamie Noble to prevent Dolph Ziggler from attacking AJ Styles.

Kidman's contract was furloughed by the company on April 15, 2020, due to COVID-19 cutbacks. He returned to the company on September 25, 2020.

== Personal life ==
Gruner is Jewish. After being together for four years, Gruner married former WWE Diva Torrie Wilson on July 11, 2003. They lived together in Tampa, Florida when not traveling. The couple separated in mid-2006 and divorced in 2008.

A book detailing Gruner's career, Billy Kidman: The Shooting Star, was released in early 2014.

== Championships and awards ==
- East Coast Wrestling Association
  - ECWA Tag Team Championship (1 time) – with Ace Darling
  - ECWA Hall of Fame (Class of 2004)
- Pro Wrestling Illustrated
  - Ranked No. 31 of the 500 best singles wrestlers of the year in PWI 500 in 1999
  - Ranked No. 313 of the top 500 singles wrestlers in the "PWI Years" in 2003
- Revolution Xtreme Wrestling
  - RXW World Heavyweight Championship (1 time)
- Trans-World Wrestling Federation
  - TWWF Cruiserweight Championship (1 time)
- World Championship Wrestling
  - WCW Cruiserweight Championship (3 times)
  - WCW Cruiserweight Tag Team Championship (1 time) – with Rey Mysterio Jr.
  - WCW World Tag Team Championship (2 times) – with Rey Mysterio Jr. (1) and Konnan (1)
- World Series Wrestling
  - WSW World Heavyweight Championship (1 time)
- World Wrestling Federation/Entertainment
  - WCW/WWF/E Cruiserweight Championship (4 times)
  - WWE Tag Team Championship (1 time) – with Paul London
- Wrestling Observer Newsletter
  - Worst Feud of the Year (2000) vs. Hulk Hogan

== Bibliography ==
- Carrington, L. Anne (2014). Billy Kidman: The Shooting Star. Palm Tree Books

== See also ==
- List of Jewish professional wrestlers
