= Kid Romeo =

American professional wrestler (born 1975)

Personal information
- Born: Samuel Román; 1975 (age 50–51) Miami, Florida, U.S.

Professional wrestling career
- Ring name(s): Kid Romeo; Romeo
- Billed height: 5 ft 10 in (1.78 m)
- Billed weight: 185 lb (84 kg)
- Billed from: South Beach, Florida
- Trained by: Paul Orndorff; WCW Power Plant
- Debut: September 3, 1999
- Retired: November 16, 2008

Samuel Román (born 1975) is a Puerto Rican-American former professional wrestler. He is best known for his stint in World Championship Wrestling in 2001 under the ring name Kid Romeo, where he was one half of the first ever Cruiserweight Tag Team Champions alongside Elix Skipper.

== Professional wrestling career ==
=== World Championship Wrestling (1999–2001) ===
After briefly working as a male stripper, Román started wrestling in 1999 in World Championship Wrestling after being trained by Paul Orndorff at the WCW Power Plant. He debuted later that year at a house show on September 3 under the ring name Kid Romeo, where he defeated Triple A. Two days later, Triple A defeated Romeo in a rematch. After Triple A began using his real name (Allan Funk), the two exchanged victories on Saturday Night before Romeo began wrestling against fellow Power Plant graduates in dark matches through the rest of 1999 and into early 2000.

On the January 24, 2000 episode of Nitro, Romeo made his televised debut and was easily defeated by The Wall. Two days later on Thunder, Romeo lost to Prince Iaukea in a Cruiserweight Championship tournament quarterfinal match. After winning a few consecutive dark matches, Roman was sent to Japan to compete in New Japan Pro-Wrestling in order to further hone his skills.

After losing a match against Essa Ríos on the February 10, 2001 episode of Jakked, Roman returned to WCW, where he resumed his Kid Romeo name and lost to Chris Harris in a dark match before SuperBrawl Revenge. On the March 5 episode of Nitro, Romeo was introduced as Elix Skipper's mystery tag team partner against A.J. Styles and Air Paris. With Skipper, Romeo won his redebut match and they both advanced to the semi-finals of a tournament to crown the inaugural Cruiserweight Tag Team Champions. Upon returning, Romeo adopted a heel gimmick loosely based on Ricky Martin, which was further emphasized with his entrance music being a cover of Martin's song "The Cup of Life". The following week on Nitro, Skipper and Romeo defeated The Jung Dragons to advance to the finals of the tournament. On March 18 at Greed, WCW's final pay-per-view, Romeo and Skipper defeated The Filthy Animals (Rey Mysterio Jr. and Kidman) in the tournament finals to become the promotion's first ever Cruiserweight Tag Team Champions, which also gave Romeo the first championship of his career. Romeo and Skipper began feuding with the Animals over the title, and on the final episode of Thunder on March 21, Romeo and Skipper's undefeated streak was broken as they and Chavo Guerrero Jr. lost to Mysterio Jr. Kidman and Shane Helms. On the final episode of Nitro on March 26, their feud culminated as Romeo and Skipper lost the Cruiserweight Tag Team Title to Mysterio Jr. and Kidman in what turned out to be the second to last match in WCW's history.

=== Independent circuit, hiatus and retirement (2002–2005, 2008) ===
Following WCW's closure, Román traveled to Puerto Rico to wrestle for the World Wrestling Council. He also made some appearances in Total Nonstop Action Wrestling, making his debut there on July 10, 2002, in a six-way elimination match that included Tony Mamaluke, Christopher Daniels, Elix Skipper, Jerry Lynn, and Low Ki, although Román was eliminated after Low Ki forced him to submit. He returned to TNA on May 21 as Romeo, competing in a four-way match against CM Punk, Jason Cross and Paul London, the latter of whom won the match and became the number one contender to the X Division Championship. From 2003 to 2004, Román would continue to be used as a jobber, losing to the likes of Raven, Jeff Hardy, Kid Kash and Chris Sabin. During his time with TNA, Román's only victory was a tag team dark match where he and Sonjay Dutt defeated The Naturals. In addition to TNA, Roman also wrestled in Championship Wrestling from Florida for a short time, where he feuded with Tyree Pride. He returned to TNA for the final time on May 17, 2005, where he lost to Zach Gowen. Román then took a hiatus from wrestling and subsequently began working as an exterminator.

In 2008, Román returned to wrestling as Romeo and joined NWA South Atlantic. On May 10, he teamed with Benny Blanco as the Casanova Cartel to defeat Manson and Black Knight (the latter substituting for Manson's partner Rico Moon) to win the territory's Tag Team Championship. The Cartel would go on to hold the title for over six months before being defeated by the SWAT Patrol on November 15. Following the title loss, Román retired from wrestling.

== Championships and accomplishments ==
- NWA South Atlantic
  - NWA South Atlantic Tag Team Championship (1 time) – with Benny Blanco
- World Championship Wrestling
  - WCW Cruiserweight Tag Team Championship (1 time) – with Elix Skipper
  - WCW Cruiserweight Tag Team Championship Tournament (2001) - with Elix Skipper
