= Eddie Edwards (wrestler) =

American professional wrestler (born 1983)

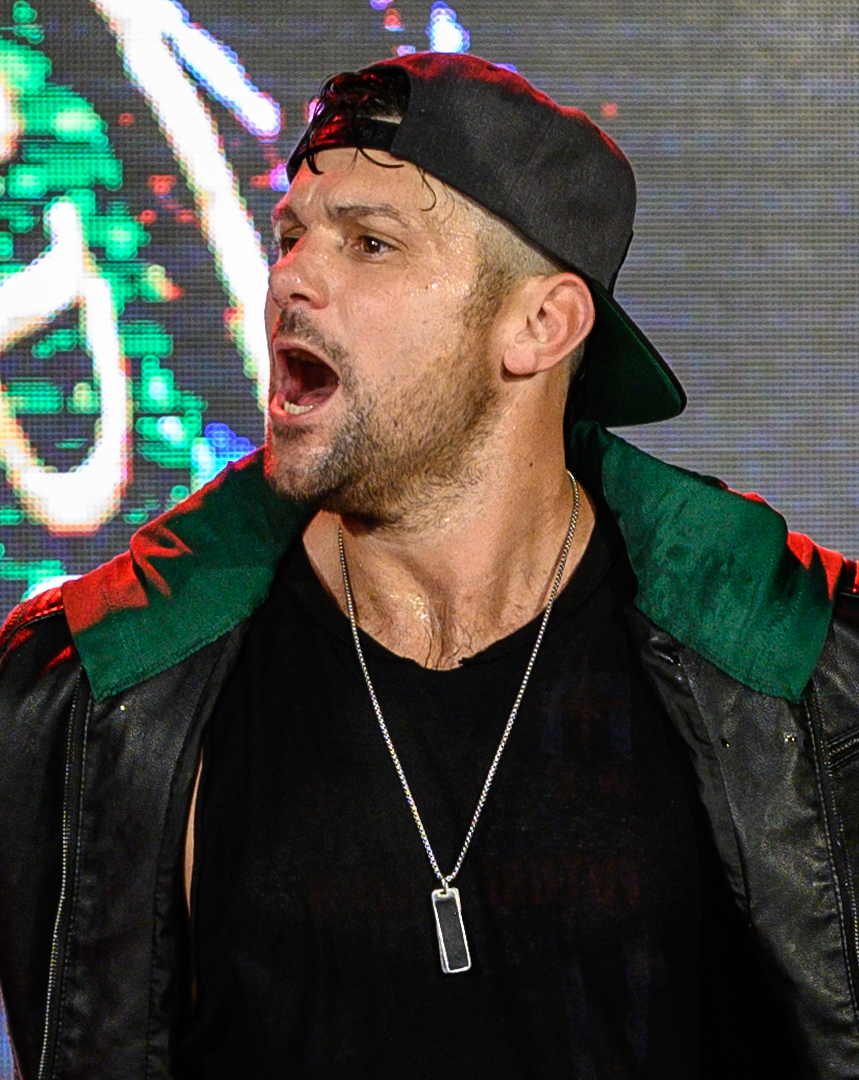
- Edwards in 2019

Personal information
- Born: Eric Maher; December 30, 1983 (age 42) Boston, Massachusetts, U.S.
- Spouse: Alisha Edwards (m. 2015)
- Children: 1

Professional wrestling career
- Ring name(s): Eddie Edwards; John Cahill
- Billed height: 6 ft 0 in (1.83 m)
- Billed weight: 214 lb (97 kg)
- Billed from: Boston, Massachusetts
- Trained by: Killer Kowalski; Slyck Wagner Brown
- Debut: 2002

Eric Maher (born December 30, 1983), better known by the ring name Eddie Edwards, is an American professional wrestler. He is signed to Total Nonstop Action Wrestling (TNA), where he is the second and current leader of The System.

In TNA, Edwards is a former two-time TNA World Champion, two-time TNA X Division Champion and a seven-time TNA World Tag Team Champion, where he won it five times with Davey Richards and twice with Brian Myers.

Edwards has also wrestled for Ring of Honor (ROH), where he is a former World Champion, the inaugural Television Champion and a two-time World Tag Team Champion with his partner Davey Richards as the American Wolves. He won ROH's Survival of the Fittest tournament in November 2010 which propelled him to win the World Championship. His World Championship victory made him the first wrestler to win the ROH Triple Crown and the first wrestler to ever hold both the TNA and ROH Triple Crowns. He was also a regular for the Southern California-based promotion Pro Wrestling Guerrilla (PWG) and has made several tours of Japan with Pro Wrestling Noah, where he is a former GHC Heavyweight Champion, making him the first gaijin to hold that title.

Between TNA, ROH and Noah, Edwards has won 15 total championships (including four world championships) and is the only wrestler to have held the TNA, ROH and GHC world championships.

== Professional wrestling career ==
=== Independent circuit (2002–present) ===
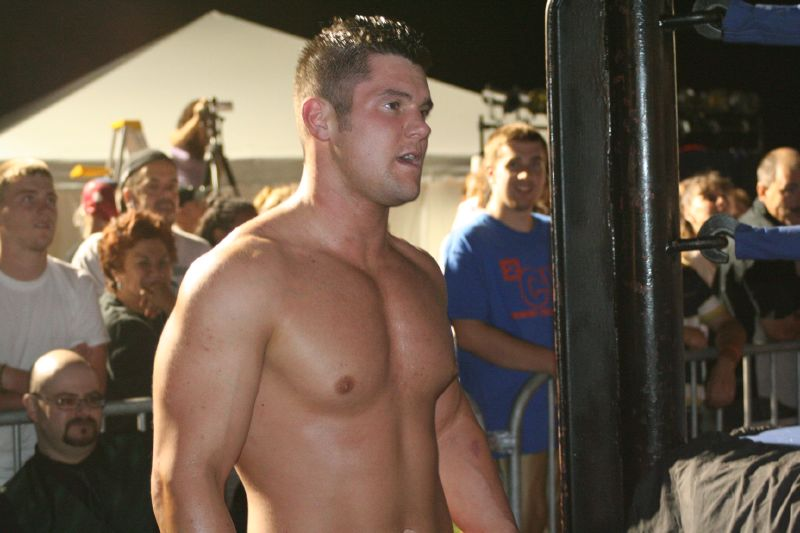
Edwards at a 2CW show in August 2008

Debuting in 2002 as Eddie Edwards, Maher has competed for numerous independent promotions throughout his career, most notably New England Championship Wrestling (NECW), Top Rope Promotions (TRP), Maryland Championship Wrestling, and the Millennium Wrestling Federation (MWF). He has also competed for MXW Pro Wrestling, Defiant Pro Wrestling, Power League Wrestling, Showcase Pro Wrestling and Big Time Wrestling.

On February 5, 2003, Edwards became the first MWF Television Champion, by defeating Jerelle Clark in the final of a tournament to crown the inaugural champion. He held the title for over two and a half years, before losing it to Tommaso Ciampa in a three-way match, also involving A.J. Styles.

In January 2007, Edwards started wrestling for Squared Circle Wrestling (2CW). As part of 2CW he wrestled against R. J. Brewer, C. W. Anderson, Samoa Joe, and challenged Slyck Wagner Brown for the 2CW Title in August 2008. Edwards won his first title in 2CW, the 2CW Tag Team Championship alongside Davey Richards, on April 2, 2010. They held the championship for four months before losing it to Colin Delaney and Jimmy Olsen on August 22.

On June 9, 2007, Edwards competed in NECW's annual Iron 8 Championship Tournament, where he defeated Gary Cassidy in his first round match. Later that night, he beat Bobby Fish, Brandon Locke, and Brian Fury in the final, in a four-way Iron Man match, to win the Tournament. The time limit had been reached with a four-way tie with each wrestler on two pinfalls, so Edwards won in sudden death overtime, during which Fish broke his ankle.

On October 30, 2011, Edwards made an appearance in Chikara, losing to Jigsaw.

On November 30, 2012, he and Roderick Strong, billed as the Dojo Bros., won the Premiere Wrestling Xperience's Tag Team Championship.

At House of Hardcore VII, Edwards made his debut in the promotion, defeating Eddie Kingston.

=== Pro Wrestling Noah (2005–2013, 2017, 2019) ===
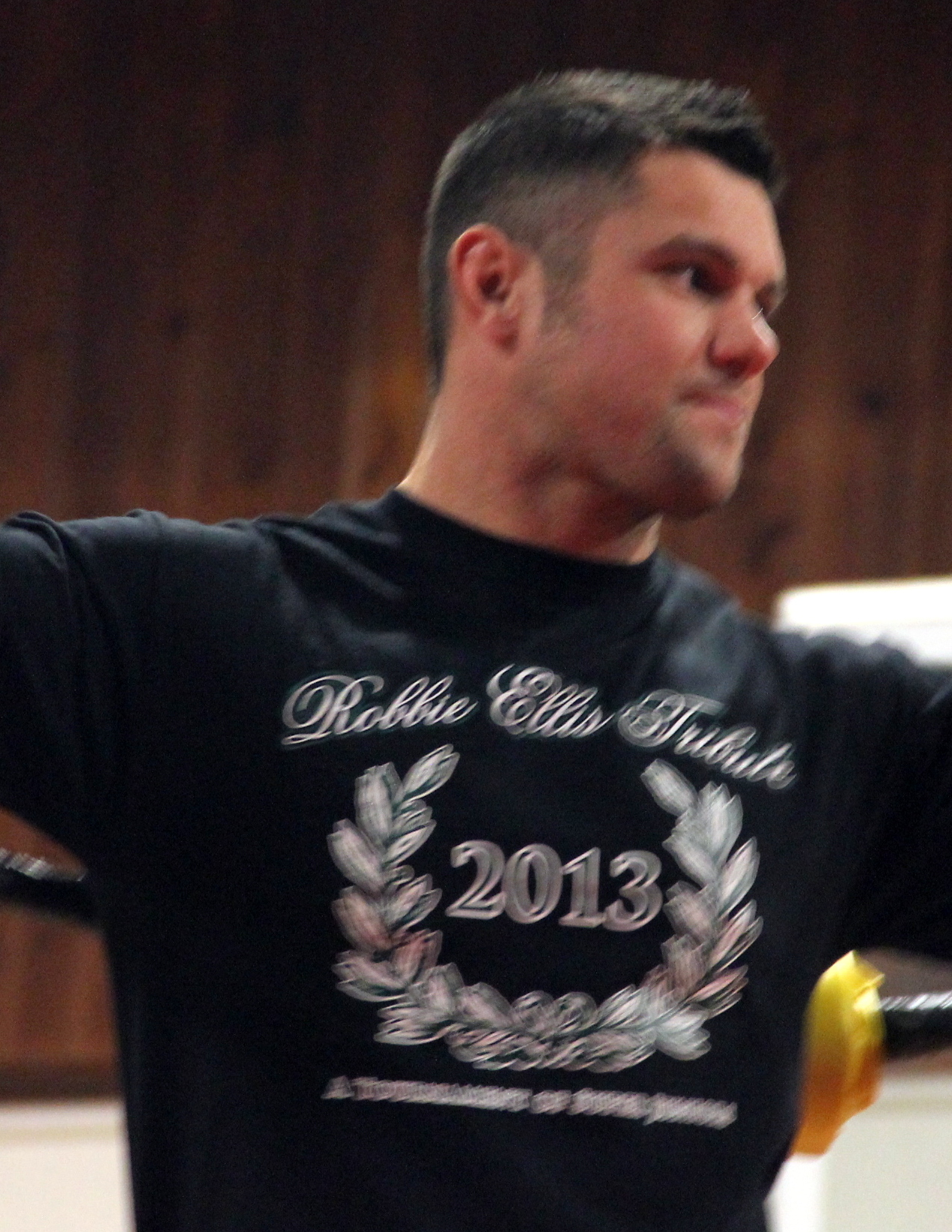
Edwards wrestling on the independent circuit in November 2013

On August 20, 2005, Edwards started his first tour with Japanese promotion Pro Wrestling Noah. During the tour, which lasted until September 18, Edwards wrestled mainly opening matches, losing all of them. During his time in Noah, Edwards also underwent further training. During 2006, Edwards made two more tours with Noah, first in April and the second in November. On December 2, Edwards picked up his first win in Noah, when he and Doug Williams defeated Shuhei Taniguchi and Yoshinari Ogawa in a tag team match, with Edwards pinning Taniguchi for the win. During the next years, Edwards continued making two tours of Noah per year and now had begun earning himself title matches in the promotion. On May 25, 2007, Edwards and Ted DiBiase, Jr. unsuccessfully challenged Kentaro Shiga and Kishin Kawabata for the GHC Hardcore Tag Team Championship, and on November 28, 2008, Edwards also unsuccessfully challenged Kenta for the GHC Junior Heavyweight Championship. During the tours, Edwards formed a partnership with Ricky Marvin, with whom he took part in the 2008 and 2009 Nippon TV Cup Jr. Heavyweight Tag Leagues, with the two making the semifinals in the latter. In the 2010 edition of the tournament, Edwards and Roderick Strong made it to the finals, before losing to the team of Atsushi Aoki and Kenta. On January 29, 2011, Edwards received his second shot at the GHC Junior Heavyweight Championship, but was defeated by the defending champion, Kotaro Suzuki. In April 2012, Edwards took part in his first Global Tag League, teaming with Colt Cabana. After two wins, one draw and four losses, the team was eliminated from the tournament, but was afterward awarded the Technique award. Edwards then formed a new partnership with Bobby Fish, with whom he took part in the 2012 Nippon TV Cup Jr. Heavyweight Tag League and 2013 Global Tag League. Edwards returned to Noah in late October 2013 to take part in the 2013 Global League. Despite big wins over reigning GHC Heavyweight Champion Kenta and Katsuhiko Nakajima, he finished last in his block.

On August 26, 2017, Edwards defeated Katsuhiko Nakajima to win the GHC Heavyweight Championship for the first time, becoming the first ever gaijin to win the title. On October 1, he defeated Naomichi Marufuji for his first successful title defense. He lost the title to Kenoh on December 22.

Edwards returned to NOAH in a Tag Team match, along with Go Shiozaki and Yoshiki Inamura against the team of HAYATA, Kenoh and Masa Kitamiya. The team of Edwards lost the match. However, Edwards won his match against Kitamiya on February 24, and that same night, they challenged the new Tag Team Champions, Go Shiozaki and Katsuhiko Nakajima (AXIZ) to a title match. The match took place on March 10, which Edwards and Kitamiya were defeated.

Edwards once again returned to a NOAH ring in November 2019 for a six-man tag team match at NOAH The Best in the Ryogoku Kokugikan. He aligned himself with heel group Stinger, joining the tag team of Atsushi Kotoge and Chris Ridgeway against Masaaki Mochizuki, Minoru Tanaka, and Super Crazy. Edwards won the match for his team after hitting Super Crazy with a Tiger Driver and a Shining Wizard.

=== Ring of Honor (2006–2013) ===
==== Early appearances (2006–2008) ====
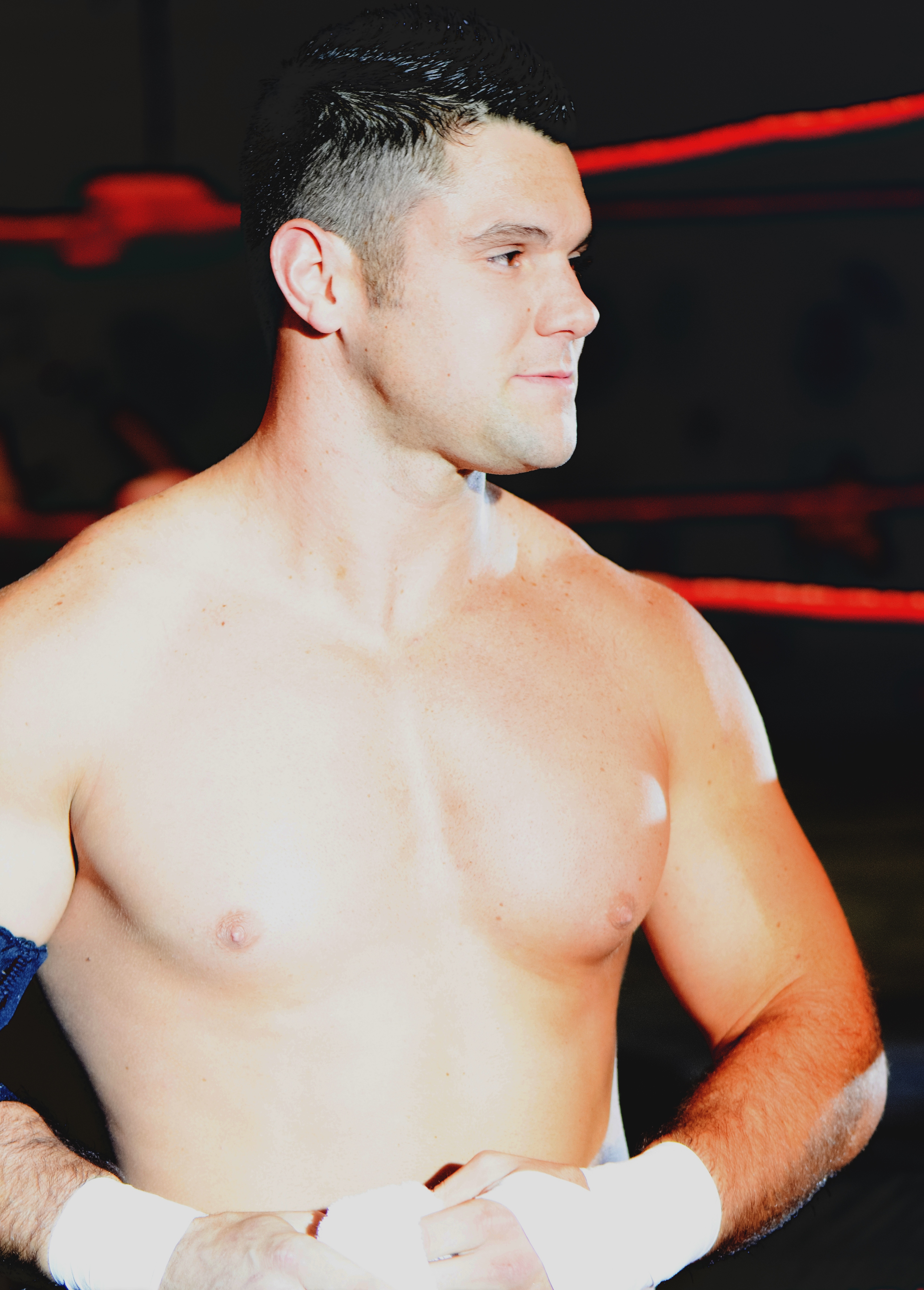
Edwards at a Ring of Honor show in August 2011

Edwards made his Ring of Honor (ROH) debut on December 22, 2006, at International Challenge, losing to Austin Aries. His second ROH appearance was over a month later, when he lost to Jack Evans at Dedicated on January 26, 2007.

On April 11, 2008, at Bedlam In Beantown, after defeating Jigsaw, Edwards accepted Larry Sweeney's proposal to join his faction, Sweet and Sour, Inc. His first match as part of Sweet and Sour, Inc was a tag team match against Erick Stevens and Pelle Primeau on April 12 at Injustice, which Edwards and fellow faction member Chris Hero won. Following this match, he went on a hiatus from ROH until Up For Grabs in June, when he lost to Claudio Castagnoli. In September 2008, Sweet and Sour, Inc, and Edwards in particular, became embroiled in a feud with Erick Stevens, leading to various combinations of the faction members taking on Stevens and an assortment of tag team partners. This included a match where Stevens and Brent Albright defeated Edwards and Adam Pearce at the Driven pay-per-view.

==== The American Wolves (2008–2010) ====
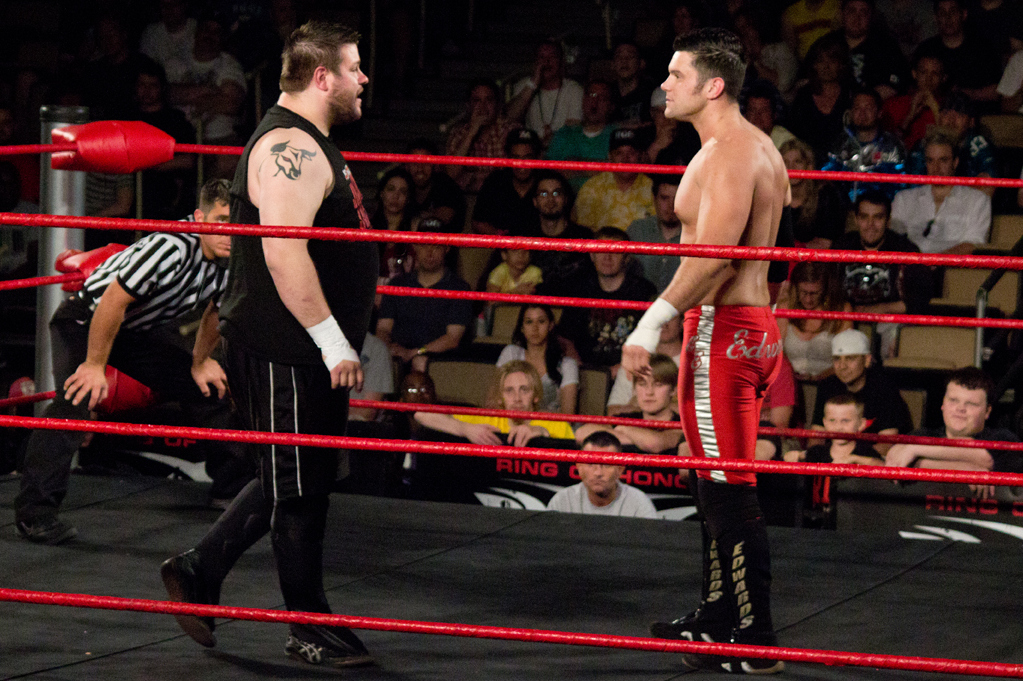
During his feud with El Generico and Kevin Steen (left) over the ROH World Tag Team Championship in 2009, Edwards broke his elbow

Later that year, in December, Edwards began teaming with fellow Sweet and Sour, Inc member, Davey Richards, as The American Wolves. Their first match as a team was on December 26, at All Star Extravaganza IV, where they lost to The Briscoe Brothers (Jay and Mark) in a three-way elimination tag team match, which also involved Claudio Castagnoli and Nigel McGuinness. The following night at Final Battle 2008, the American Wolves, along with Go Shiozaki, lost to Brent Albright, Roderick Strong, and Erick Stevens in a "New York City Street Fight". Later that night, they attacked and injured Mark Briscoe. As 2009 began, they began challenging for the ROH World Tag Team Championship, losing to the champions Kevin Steen and El Generico on numerous occasions. They eventually won the Championship on April 10, at a Ring of Honor Wrestling taping, in a "Tables are Legal" match. Edwards and Richards went on to successfully defend the Championship against teams made up of ROH's top wrestlers including Tyler Black and Bryan Danielson, and against former champions Kevin Steen and El Generico at Manhattan Mayhem III in a submission match.

On September 25, Edwards suffered a broken elbow in an Anything Goes match against Kevin Steen. Despite the injury, he was able to compete the following night in a Ladder War against Steen and Generico, in which The American Wolves retained the championship. Edwards underwent successful surgery on October 6, after the surgery was postponed from October 1. On his return to ROH on December 19 at Final Battle 2009, The American Wolves lost the Tag Team Championship to the Briscoe Brothers.

==== Focus on singles competition (2010–2012) ====
In 2010, Edwards competed in a tournament to determine the inaugural ROH World Television Champion. He defeated Colt Cabana and Kevin Steen en route to the final, where he defeated his tag team partner Richards to become the inaugural champion on March 5. He made his first defense of the championship at the Ring of Honor Wrestling television tapings the following night, by defeating Cabana, and went to successfully defend the championship again on March 20 by defeating Petey Williams. At the Ring of Honor Wrestling tapings in May, Edwards introduced the "10 Minute Hunt", where if his opponent can either defeat Edwards within 10 minutes or last 10 minutes, they would receive a future ROH World Television Championship match.

During a match at the Ring of Honor Wrestling television tapings on July 16, Davey Richards lost to Roderick Strong after refusing assistance from Shane Hagadorn, the manager of The American Wolves. Afterwards, Richards attacked Hagadorn when Hagadorn claimed credit for making Richards the best wrestler in the world, and Edwards sided with Richards, ending their association with Hagadorn. On September 8, 2010, Ring of Honor announced that Edwards had signed a contract extension with the company. Later that week, he successfully defended the ROH World Television Championship against two members of The Embassy. He defeated Erick Stevens on September 10, before defeating Shawn Daivari at Glory By Honor IX the following night.

On November 12, 2010, Edwards won the 2010 Survival of the Fittest tournament. He defeated Chris Hero in the first round to advance to the final, a six-man elimination match, in which he last eliminated Kenny King via submission to win. The following month on December 9, Edwards defeated Mark Briscoe to retain the ROH World Television Championship at the Ring of Honor Wrestling tapings, before losing it to Christopher Daniels at the second night of television tapings the following day. On March 19, 2011, at Manhattan Mayhem IV, Edwards defeated defending champion Roderick Strong to win the ROH World Championship for the first time. His victory made him the first person to win the ROH Triple Crown, having held the World Tag Team, World Television and World championships in the promotion. Edwards made his first title defense on April 1, defeating Christopher Daniels at the first night of Honor Takes Center Stage to retain the championship. On June 26 at Best in the World 2011, Edwards lost the ROH World Championship to Davey Richards.

Edwards then faced Roderick Strong in a "Ringmaster Challenge" two out of three falls match at Death Before Dishonor IX in September, with the winner earning a guaranteed match for the ROH World Championship. With one decision each, Edwards and Strong competed in a 15-minute Iron Man match for the third decision, which Edwards won during overtime. In order to prepare for his World Championship match, Edwards began training with Dan Severn to counter Richards' mixed martial arts moves. At Final Battle 2011, Severn accompanied Edwards to the ring for his rematch with Richards, in which Edwards was unsuccessful in regaining the ROH World Championship. At the January 7, 2012, tapings of Ring of Honor Wrestling, Edwards formed a new partnership with Adam Cole, opposite Davey Richards and Kyle O'Reilly. At ROH's Homecoming 2012 show on January 20, it was announced that Edwards would be unable to compete during that weekend's shows due to a staph infection, although he still made an appearance to aid Cole. On March 4 at the 10th Anniversary Show, Edwards and Cole defeated Davey Richards and Kyle O'Reilly in a main event tag team match.

==== Return of the American Wolves (2012–2013) ====
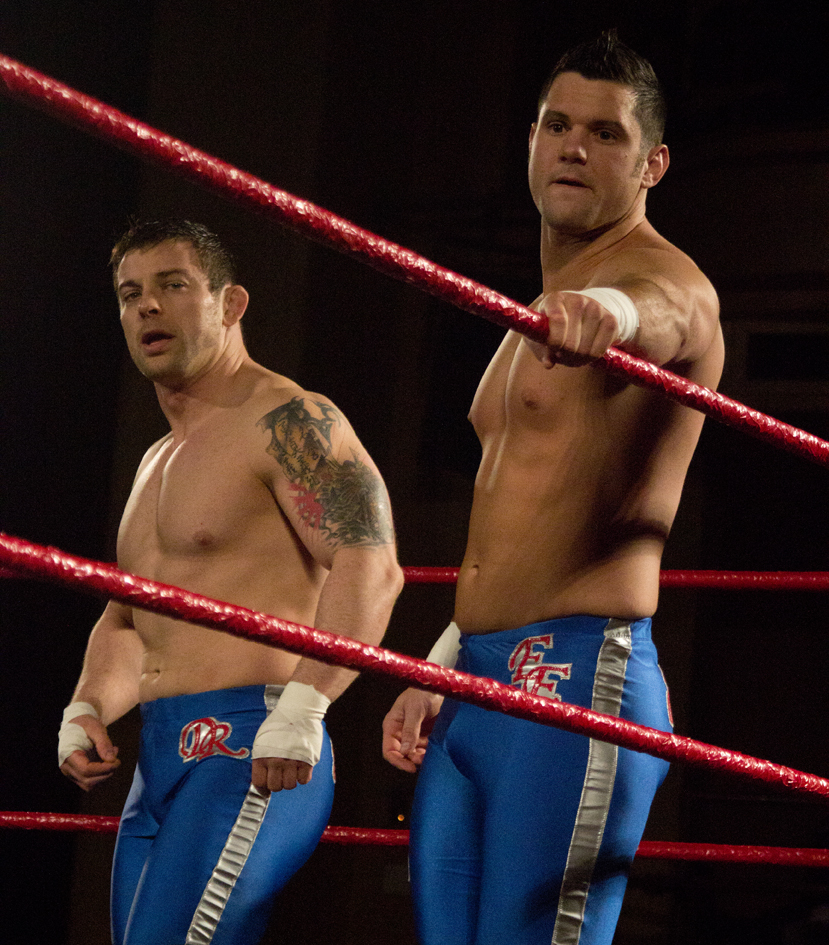
Edwards (right) with Davey Richards at Supercard of Honor VII in April 2013

On December 16 at Final Battle 2012: Doomsday, Edwards reunited with Davey Richards in a tag team match, where they defeated Bobby Fish and Kyle O'Reilly. Following their win, the American Wolves received a shot at the ROH World Tag Team Championship, but were defeated by the defending champions, the Briscoe Brothers, on January 18, 2013. On August 3, the American Wolves defeated the Forever Hooligans (Alex Koslov and Rocky Romero) to win the ROH World Tag Team Championship for the second time. They lost the title to reDRagon (Bobby Fish and Kyle O'Reilly) on August 17. On September 20 at Death Before Dishonor XI, the American Wolves unsuccessfully challenged Forever Hooligans for New Japan Pro-Wrestling's IWGP Junior Heavyweight Tag Team Championship. On December 14 at Final Battle 2013, Edwards wrestled his ROH farewell match, where he and B. J. Whitmer defeated Jay Lethal and Roderick Strong. Following the match, Edwards was attacked by The Decade (Whitmer, Strong, and Jimmy Jacobs).

=== Pro Wrestling Guerrilla (2011–2013) ===
Edwards made his Pro Wrestling Guerrilla (PWG) debut on March 4, 2011, teaming with Davey Richards to participate in the fifth annual Dynamite Duumvirate Tag Team Title Tournament. After defeating the RockNES Monsters (Johnny Goodtime and Johnny Yuma) in the opening round, Edwards and Richards were eliminated in the semifinals by eventual winners The Young Bucks (Matt and Nick Jackson). A short time later, Edwards became a member of the roster. During All Star Weekend 8 on May 27 and 28, Edwards picked up his first singles victories in PWG, defeating Alex Shelley and El Generico on Night One and Night Two, respectively. On August 20, Edwards took part in the 2011 Battle of Los Angeles, defeating Roderick Strong in the opening round before losing against PWG World Champion Kevin Steen in a non-title semifinal match.

At Fear on December 10, Edwards and Richards reunited to defeat the Super Smash Brothers (Player Uno and Stupefied). Edwards received his first PWG World Championship title shot on March 17, 2012, at World's Finest. He was scheduled to wrestle champion El Generico in a rematch of their All Star Weekend 8 encounter; the bout was turned into a three-way to include Kevin Steen, who subsequently pinned Edwards and regained the championship. Edwards made his Battle of Los Angeles return on September 1 and 2. He defeated Kyle O'Reilly in the opening round, before being eliminated in the quarterfinals by Adam Cole, who ultimately won the tournament. At Mystery Vortex, which took place on December 1, Edwards teamed with Roderick Strong under the team name "Dojo Bros." and earned back-to-back tag team victories; first defeating The Young Bucks in the opening match and then PWG World Tag Team Champions Super Smash Brothers in a non-title bout. On March 23, 2013, the Dojo Bros. received a shot at the PWG World Tag Team Championship, now held by The Young Bucks, but were defeated by the defending champions. On December 21, the Dojo Bros. defeated A. R. Fox and Rich Swann in Edwards' PWG farewell match. Edwards was set to make his return to PWG on July 24, 2015, alongside Davey Richards; however, they were later pulled before the event took place.

=== WWE developmental (2013) ===
In August 2013, after their contracts with ROH had expired, Edwards and Davey Richards took part in a tryout camp for WWE, where they were described as "standing out". On November 18, Edwards and Richards entered the WWE Performance Center in Orlando, Florida for another week-long tryout. Three days later, Edwards and Richards made their NXT debut; using the team name "The American Pitbulls" and billed as John Cahill and Derek Billington respectively, they lost to NXT Tag Team Champions The Ascension (Konnor and Viktor) in a non-title match.

=== Total Nonstop Action Wrestling/Impact Wrestling ===
==== Tag team championship reigns (2014–2016) ====
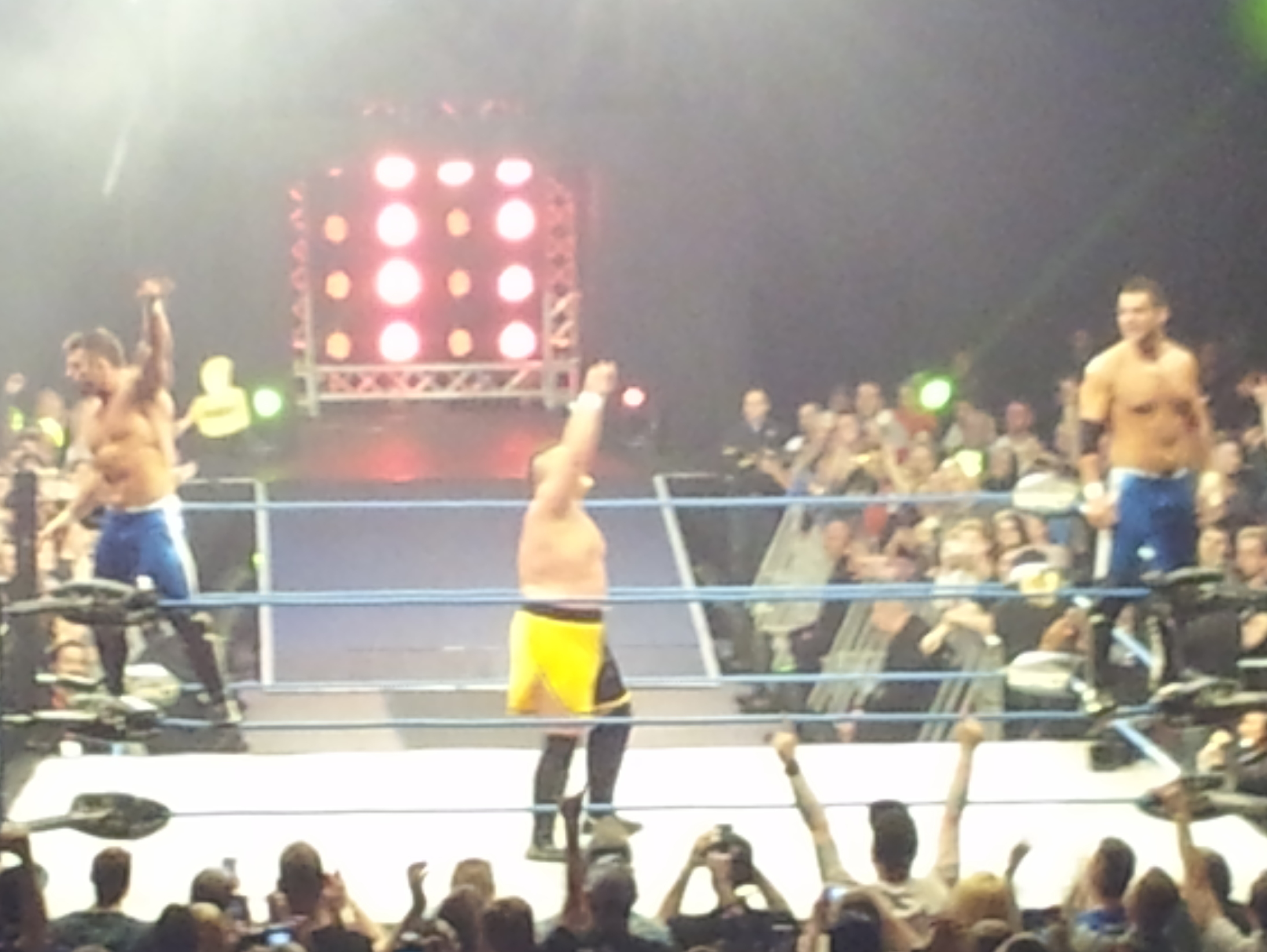
The Wolves (Edwards (right) and Davey Richards (left)) and Samoa Joe (middle) after a tag team match in 2014.

On January 16, 2014, Edwards and Richards (now renamed as The Wolves), appeared on the first episode of the Genesis specials of Impact Wrestling in a backstage segment with Dixie Carter. As part of their debut storyline, they revealed they had signed contracts with a new investor in TNA. Their in-ring debut came the following week, when they and Samoa Joe defeated The BroMans (Robbie E and Jessie Godderz) and Zema Ion in a six-man tag team match. On February 23 Edwards and Richards defeated TheBroMans to win the TNA World Tag Team Championship. After a week-long reign, The Wolves lost the championship back to The BroMans at Wrestle-1's Kaisen: Outbreak event in Tokyo, Japan in a three-way match, also including Team 246 (Kaz Hayashi and Shuji Kondo). On April 27 at the Sacrifice pay-per-view, The Wolves regained the championship by defeating Robbie E, Godderz, and DJ Z in a two-on-three handicap match. On June 15, 2014, at Slammiversary XII Edwards competed in six-way ladder match for TNA X Division Championship, which was won by Sanada. The Wolves returned to Wrestle-1 on July 6, successfully defending the TNA World Tag Team Championship against the Junior Stars (Koji Kanemoto and Minoru Tanaka). They also retained the championship in matches against Bram and Magnus and The Hardys (Matt and Jeff Hardy). After being challenged to a three-way tag team match for the title by The Hardys and Team 3D, it was decided all three teams would compete in a best of three series for the title, with the winners of the each match being able to choose the stipulation of the next. At the end of the series, the teams each had won one match so a fourth match was held; The Wolves won a Full Metal Mayhem match to retain the championship. At the Impact Wrestling tapings on September 19, Edwards and Richards lost the championship to James Storm and Abyss, but regained the title on January 30, 2015, from The Revolution.

On February 15, Edwards suffered a broken heel during a special match against his partner Davey Richards at the One Night Only X-Travaganza taping, and required surgery. As a result of the injury, The Wolves vacated the Tag Team Championship at the television tapings on March 13. On May 8, 2015, on a live edition of Impact Wrestling. he returned and him and Davey Richards issued a Challenge to Bobby Roode & Austin Aries to a best of 5 series for the TNA World Tag Team Titles. The Wolves won the first 2 matches and Dirty Heels won the next two. At Slammiversary, Aries defeated Richards, so he choose the stipulation for the last match of the series, a 30 minutes tag team Iron Man match. On June 25, 2015 (aired July 1, 2015) The Wolves defeated Dirty Heels to win the Tag Team Titles. With this victory, The Wolves shared with Beer Money the record of most reigns, with four. On July 28, (aired September 2, 2015) they lost the titles to Brian Myers and Trevor Lee. The Wolves regained the titles the following week in a rematch. At Bound for Glory, The Wolves successfully retained their titles against Myers and Lee in a rematch. During October and November (taped in July), Edwards participated in the TNA World Title Series as a member of Group Tag Team Specialists along with Robbie E his fellow partner Davey Richards and Matt Hardy, where he ended of his fourth block, failing to advance to the finals.

At TNA One Night Only: Live, The Wolves successfully retained their titles in a three-way tag team match against Kurt Angle and Drew Galloway and Eli Drake and Jessie Godderz. Then, they started a feud against Decay, defeating them by disqualification on the January 26 episode of Impact Wrestling. The feud culminated in a Monster's Ball match on the February 16 episode of Impact Wrestling, which The Wolves won, retaining their titles. On the March 8 episode of Impact Wrestling, The Wolves dropped the titles to Beer Money.

==== TNA World Heavyweight Champion (2016–2017) ====
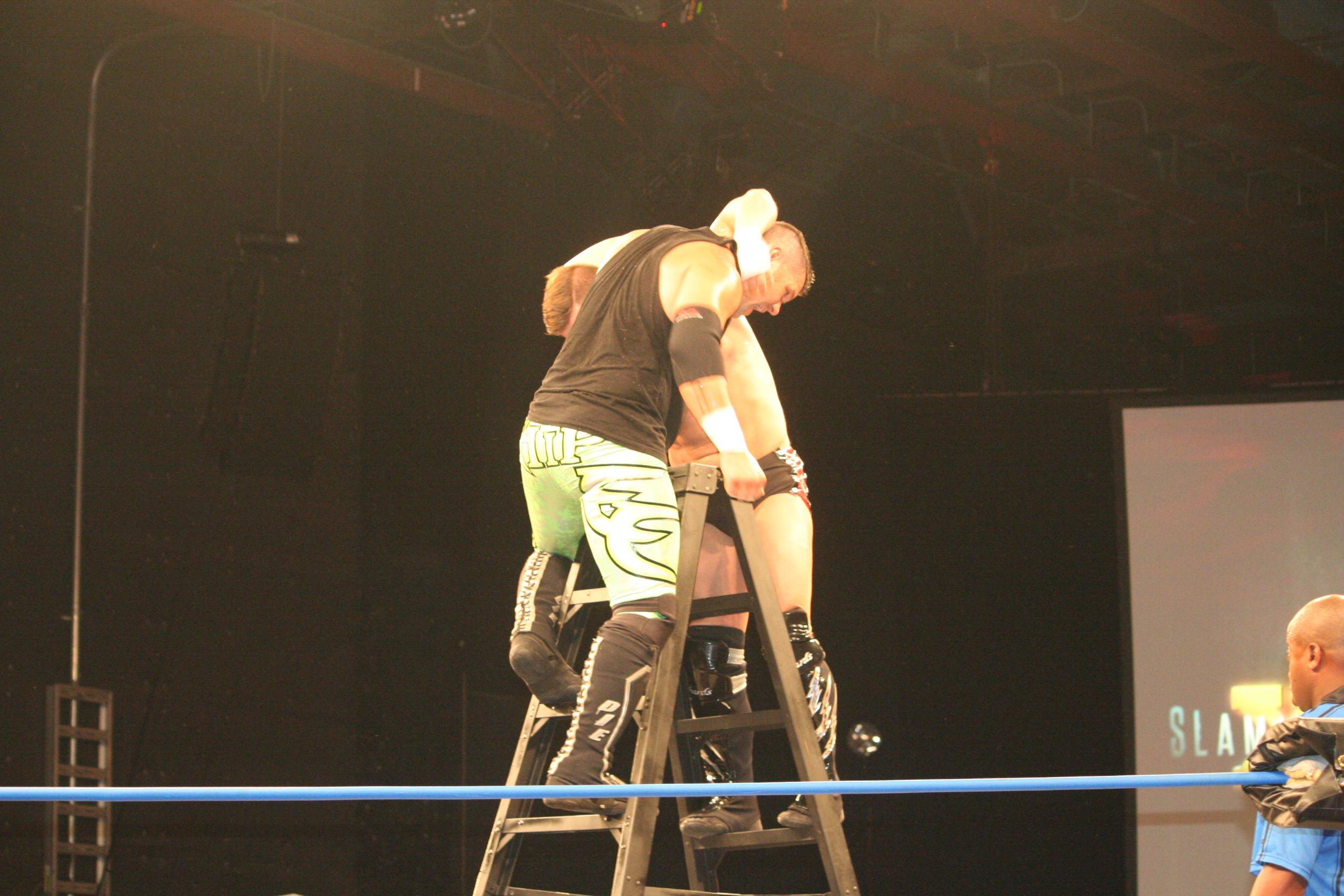
The Wolves dissolved in 2017 after Richards turned on Edwards.

Richards would be injured in the match, and Edwards would embark on a singles career. On the April 19 episode of Impact Wrestling, he started a feud with Trevor Lee and Gregory Helms, challenging Lee for the TNA X Division Championship in a three-way also involving DJ Z, but lost the match. Then, Edwards failed to win the X Division Championship two times, in an Ultimate X match at May Mayhem, which also included DJ Z and Andrew Everett, and in a singles match against Lee on the June 7 episode of Impact Wrestling. Five days later at Slammiversary, Edwards defeated Lee, DJ Z and Andrew Everett in a four-way match to win the TNA X Division Championship, marking his first singles title in TNA. He successfully retained his title against Lee in a rematch on the Gold Rush special episode of Impact Wrestling.

On the June 14 tapings of the June 21 episode of Impact Wrestling, however, Edwards dropped the title to Mike Bennett. Edwards regained the title the following day during an Ultimate X match to become a two-time X Division Champion. At Destination X, he used Option C to have a match against Lashley for the TNA World Heavyweight Championship, his title was also on the line. However, the match ended in a no contest after an interference from Bennett and Edwards was attacked by the debuting Moose. A week later, Edwards lost the X Division Championship to Lashley in a "Winner Takes All" Six Sides of Steel match with the TNA World Heavyweight Championship also on the line. On the September 22 episode of Impact Wrestling, he saved DJZ from an attack by The Helms Dynasty, and challenged him for a match for his X Division Championship, which DJZ accepted. However, a week later, Edwards failed to win the championship. After the match, both men were attacked by The Helms Dynasty. At Bound for Glory, he replaced Drew Galloway in his match against Aron Rex for the inaugural Impact Grand Championship, but was ultimately defeated.

On the October 6 episode of Impact Wrestling, Edwards defeated Lashley to win his first TNA World Heavyweight Championship. On the October 20 episode of Impact Wrestling, he successfully defended his title against Cody and against Lashley on the November 3 episode of Impact Wrestling. The following week, Edwards defeated Bound for Gold winner Eli Drake to retain his title. After the match, he was attacked by the Death Crew Council (James Storm, Bram and Kingston). On the November 17 episode of Impact Wrestling, he and Brother Nero were defeated by the DCC in a No Holds Barred handicap match. On the December 8 episode of Impact Wrestling, Edwards defended his title against Ethan Carter III, but the match ended in a no contest.

On the January 5, 2017, episode of Impact Wrestling, Edwards successfully defended his title against EC3 and Lashley in a three-way match after interference from Davey Richards. The next day, Edwards successfully defended his title against EC3 at the One Night Only: Live! event. At Genesis, Edwards lost the championship against Lashley in an Iron man match. On the February 9 episode of Impact Wrestling, Edwards lost his rematch after Richards and his wife Angelina Love interfered and turned on Edwards and his wife Alisha. After the match, Richards attacked Eddie, thus ending The Wolves in the process.

On the February 16 episode of Impact Wrestling, Edwards faced Richards in a Street Fight, however the match ended in a no contest. On the March 9 episode of Impact Wrestling, Edwards brawled with Richards at the beginning of the show, but the two were separated by security guards. On the April 6 episode of Impact Wrestling, Edwards was defeated by Richards in a Last Man Standing match. A month later, Edwards was defeated by Matt Sydal. After the match, Edwards and Alisha were attacked by Richards and Love. At No Surrender, Edwards once again failed to regain the Impact World Heavyweight Championship from Lashley. On the June 25 episode of Impact Wrestling, Edwards and Alisha defeated Richards and Love in a mixed tag team match. On the June 29 episode of Impact Wrestling in India, Edwards teamed with Alberto El Patron, James Storm and Mahabali Shera to defeat Richards, Ethan Carter III, Kongo Kong and Lashley. The feud ended at Slammiversary when Edwards and Alisha defeated Richards and Love in a Full Metal Mayhem match.

After a series of various match, notably against Eli Drake, Edwards entered at number one in the 20-man Gauntlet for the vacated GFW World Heavyweight Championship on the August 24 episode of Impact Wrestling, in which he was eliminated last by Drake. The following week, Edwards and Johnny Impact ruined Drake's championship celebration, which led to a tag team match in the main event, which Drake and Chris Adonis won. On the September 14 episode of Impact Wrestling, Edwards saved Ethan Carter III from AAA wrestlers El Hijo del Fantasma and Pagano. The following week, Edwards teamed with EC3 in a tag team match against Fantasma and Pagano, but lost after interference from El Texano Jr. Following the match, they were continually assaulted by the trio until James Storm made the save. Storm shook Edwards' hand, but refused to shake EC3's hand. At Bound for Glory, EC3, Edwards, Storm defeated Team AAA (El Hijo del Fantasma, Pagano and Texano). On November 6, 2017, in Canada, Edwards made his second defense for the GHC Heavyweight Championship against El Hijo del Fantasma, defeating him.

==== Transition as hardcore wrestler (2018–2020) ====
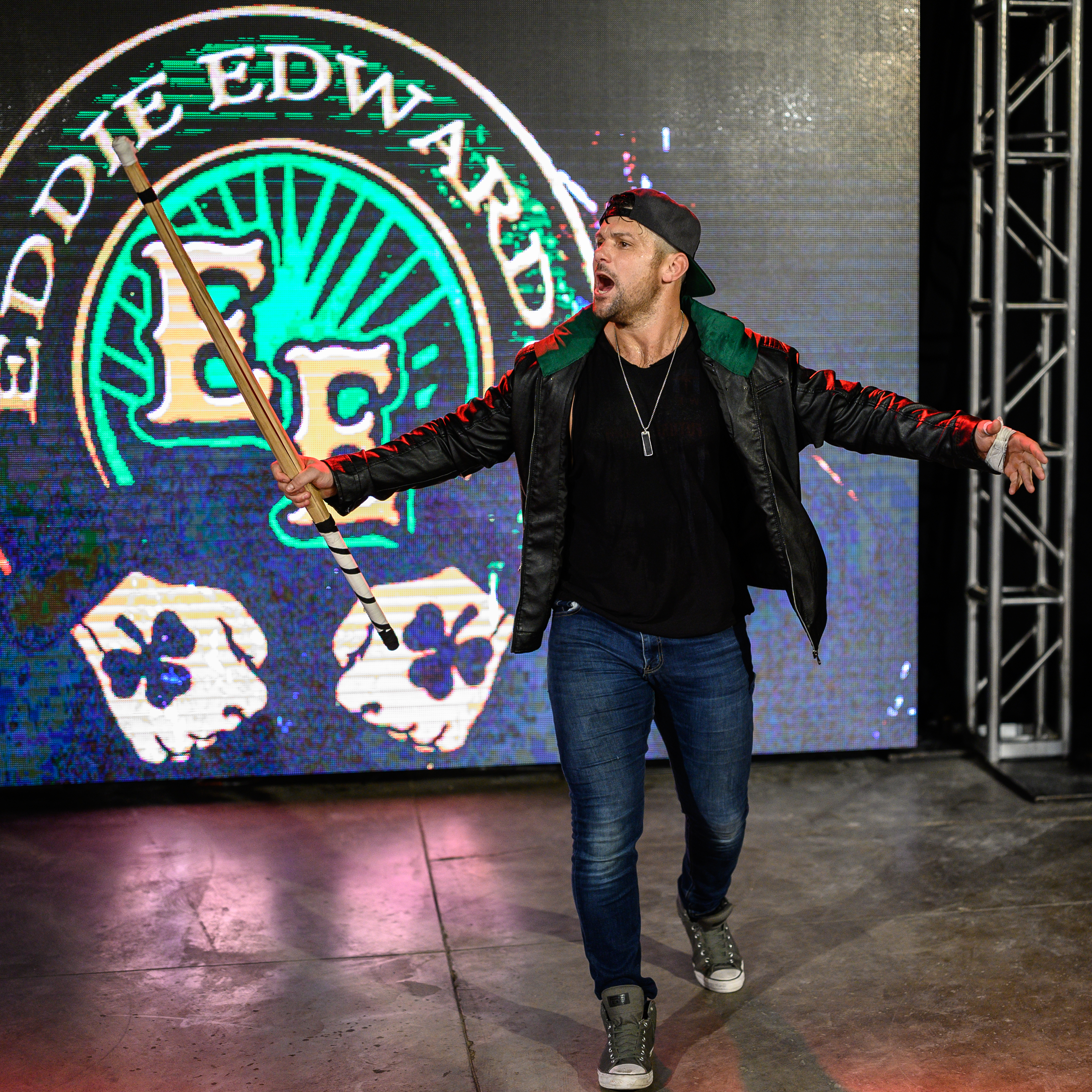
In 2018, Edwards changed his gimmick after Sami Callihan botched a spot with a baseball bat.

After a series of matches for Xplosion and Impact Wrestling, Edwards showed support for Moose during his feud against Lashley and the American Top Team on the January 11 episode of Impact Wrestling. This led to a tag-team match in which Edwards and Moose were defeated by Lashley and KM.

On the February 22 episode of Impact Wrestling, Eddie teamed with his long-time rival Lashley and defeated Ohio Versus Everything. On the March 1, 2018, episode of Impact Wrestling, Edwards was accidentally struck in the head by a baseball bat during a post-match brawl with Sami Callihan, where a chair was placed near his head and Callihan swung a baseball bat into the chair. The strike caught Edwards in the head, near his eye and nose. He was immediately taken to the hospital where he had a CT scan done, in addition to broken bones in his face, he also suffered a broken nose too. This led to a House of Hardcore match at Redemption alongside Moose and Tommy Dreamer, but the team was defeated by OVE. Immediately after the match, Eddie attacked Callihan with a barbed baseball bat and a kendo stick. He also attacked the rest of OVE, and pushed Tommy Dreamer who tried to stop him. In his rage, Eddie accidentally hurt his wife Alisha Edwards. Edwards defeated Callihan during the May 17 episode of House of Hardcore. He once again attacked Callihan and OVE after the match under the eyes of a shocking Tommy Dreamer. On the June 7 episode of Impact Wrestling, Eddie and Callihan wrestled in an Unsanctioned Fight in the Woods, where Eddie tried to kill Callihan, until being stopped by Dreamer and Alisha. On the June 14 episode of Impact Wrestling, Edwards brutally attacked Tommy Dreamer with a kendo stick after a confrontation between the duo. This led to a House of Hardcore match at Slammiversary where Eddie defeated Dreamer. After the match, Eddie cried and apologized to Dreamer for his actions. The two shook hands and Dreamer gave Eddie a kendo stick before leaving.

On the July 26 episode of Impact Wrestling, Eddie attacked Impact World Champion Austin Aries with his kendo stick, and once again the following week. This led to a championship match on the August 9 episode of Impact Wrestling which Eddie loses after being attacked by Killer Kross. The following week, Eddie attacked Kross with his kendo stick, but Aries made the save and the duo brutalized Edwards. On the August 23 episode of Impact Wrestling, Eddie was once again attacked by Aries and Kross before being saved by Moose. The following week at ReDEFINED, a match between Edwards and Moose and the duo was scheduled, however Moose was attacked before the match. Edwards wrestled the match alone, until Moose came to the ring to "help". However, Moose betrayed him, and Edwards was attacked by the trio. On the September 20 episode of Impact Wrestling at Mexico, Eddie Edwards returned and attacked the trio with his kendo stick alongside Johnny Impact. In March 2019, it was announced that Edwards had signed a multi-year deal with Impact Wrestling.

Throughout the second half of 2019 and into 2020, Edwards would feud with Ace Austin, and then Michael Elgin (engaging in a best of five series with the latter that came to a draw after a double pin in match five).

==== Various feuds (2020–2022) ====
On July 18, 2020, he would capture the now renamed Impact World Championship for the second time, winning a fatal five-way elimination match at Slammiversary for the vacant title. During this time, he would declare open challenges every week and at the same time, started a feud with the returning Eric Young. In the following weeks, he successfully defended the title in singles bouts against Trey Miguel, Sami Callihan, Brian Myers and Rob Van Dam. Edwards lost the Impact World Championship to Young on the September 1 episode of Impact!. On October 3 at Victory Road, Edwards lost to Young in the rematch for the title. At Bound for Glory, he lost to Ken Shamrock after tapping out to the ankle lock. On November 14 at Turning Point, he defeated Daivari. In early December, Eddie reignited his feud with Callihan after being attacked by him and going after his wife Alisha, before fighting him off after taking his bat. At Final Resolution, he and Alisha lost an intergender tag team match against Tenille Dashwood and Kaleb with a K, before being attacked by Callihan and getting hit with a piledriver.

On January 16, 2021, at Hard To Kill, Eddie defeated Sami Callihan in a Barbed Wire Massacre match, ending their feud. On February 13, at No Surrender, he and Matt Cardona teamed up and fought Brian Myers and Hernandez in a losing effort. The following month at Sacrifice, Edwards defeated Myers in a Hold Harmless match. In April, he got involved in a feud against Violent By Design (VBD), losing to them in an eight-man Hardcore War match at Hardcore Justice and a regular eight-man tag team match at Rebellion. On May 15, at Under Siege, Edwards teamed with FinJuice (David Finlay and Juice Robinson) in a six-man tag team match and defeated Kenny Omega and The Good Brothers (Doc Gallows and Karl Anderson). On the June 24 episode of Impact!, he teamed with New Japan Pro-Wrestling talent Satoshi Kojima to face VBD members Deaner and Joe Doering for the Impact World Tag Team Championship, but failed to win. In July, Edwards got into a feud with W. Morrissey, losing a singles bout at Slammiversary but defeated him at Homecoming in a Hardcore match. On September 18, at Victory Road, he teamed with old rival Callihan to face Morrissey and Moose in a losing effort. In November, Edwards won a three-way match to become the number one contender to Moose's Impact World Championship, but failed to win the title at Turning Point in a Full Metal Mayhem match.

==== Honor No More (2022–2023) ====
At Hard To Kill on January 8, 2022, Edwards, Rich Swann, Willie Mack, Heath and Rhino were attacked by Honor No More, a stable of Ring of Honor (ROH) wrestlers Matt Taven, Mike Bennett, PCO, and Vincent. In the following weeks on Impact, it was announced that Team Impact (Edwards, Chris Sabin, Rhino, Rich Swann, and Steve Maclin) will face Honor No More at No Surrender. At No Surrender on February 19, Edwards joined Honor No More by attacking Team Impact, costing them the match, turning heel for the first time in his Impact career. On March 5 at Sacrifice, Edwards defeated Rhino. On April 1 at Multiverse of Matches, Edwards lost to New Japan Pro-Wrestling talent Tomohiro Ishii. On April 23 at Rebellion, Edwards lost to Chris Bey in the pre-show. On May 7 at Under Siege, Edwards, along with the rest of Honor No More defeated Bullet Club (Jay White, Chris Bey, Doc Gallows, El Phantasmo, and Karl Anderson) in a 10-man tag team match. On June 19 at Slammiversary, Honor No More lost a 10-man tag team match against the Impact Originals (Alex Shelley, Chris Sabin, Frankie Kazarian, Nick Aldis, and Davey Richards). On July 1 at Against All Odds, Honor No More lost another 10-man tag team match against Heath, America's Most Wanted (Chris Harris and James Storm), and The Good Brothers (Doc Gallows and Karl Anderson). On the July 28 episode of Impact!, after Eddie Edwards defeated Ace Austin, he and the rest of Honor No More attacked the production truck and caused technical difficulties with the broadcast. Impact Executive Vice President Scott D'Amore confronted the group and put them in a 10-man tag team match against Bullet Club at Emergence; if Honor No More won, they would get a shot at the Impact World Tag Team Championship, but if Bullet Club won, Honor No More must permanently disband. At the event, Honor No More won the match.

On the August 18 episode of Impact!, Edwards won a six-way elimination match to become the number one contender to Josh Alexander's Impact World Championship at Bound for Glory. On September 23 at Victory Road, Edwards, Taven and Bennett defeated Heath, Alexander and Swann in a six-man tag team match. On October 7 at Bound for Glory, Edwards was unsuccessful in capturing the Impact World Championship from Alexander. On the October 20 episode of Impact!, Edwards tried to rally Honor No More together, but his condescending tone towards PCO caused the latter to snap and attack his now-former stablemates, officially disbanding Honor No More. Two weeks later, Edwards fought PCO in the Great Basin Desert where he incapacitated PCO and buried him in the sand. On the December 15 episode of Impact!, Edwards defeated Delirious, and attacked him after the match until the returning Jonathan Gresham made the save. On January 13 at Hard To Kill, Edwards defeated Gresham. After the match, Edwards was attacked by a returning PCO. On April 16 at Rebellion, Edwards was defeated by PCO in a Last Rites match.

==== The System (2023–present) ====
On May 26 at Under Siege, Edwards completed in the six-way match to determine the #1 contender for the Impact World Championship, which was won by Alex Shelley. On June 9 at Against All Odds, Edwards was defeated by Frankie Kazarian.

On December 9, 2023, at Final Resolution, Edwards teamed up with Brian Myers to challenge ABC (Ace Austin and Chris Bey) for the Impact World Tag Team Championship, which they were unsuccessful at winning. On December 14, Edwards resigned a new deal with TNA Wrestling. On January 13, 2024, at the "Countdown to TNA Hard to Kill", Edwards and Myers defeated Eric Young and Frankie Kazarian pre-show. During a backstage interview, Edwards, Myers, Alisha Edwards, Moose and DeAngelo Williams would form a stable calling themselves "The System". The stable later accompanied Moose to his main event match for the TNA World Championship against Alex Shelley. During the match, Edwards and the rest of The System attempted to distract Shelley, prompting a brawl with Shelley's partners, Chris Sabin and Kushida. Moose later won the match. On February 23 at the "Countdown to No Surrender" pre-show, Edwards and Myers defeated Intergalactic Jet Setters (Kevin Knight and Kushida).

On March 8 at Sacrifice, Edwards and Myers defeated ABC (Chris Bey and Ace Austin) to win the TNA World Tag Team Championship, this marked his sixth reign with the TNA World Tag Team Championship. This also marked the first time Edwards won a TNA tag team championship without Davey Richards. On April 20 at Rebellion, Edwards and Myers retained the titles against Speedball Mountain (Mike Bailey and Trent Seven). On May 3 at Under Siege, The System defeated "Broken" Matt Hardy and Speedball Mountain. On July 20 at Slammiversary, Edwards and Myers lost the TNA World Tag Team Championship to ABC, ending their reign at 134 days. Edwards and Myers regained the TNA World Tag Team Championship on September 13 at Victory Road, this marked his seventh reign with the TNA World Tag Team Championship. At the 2024 Bound for Glory Pay-Per-View, Edwards and Myers lost the TNA World Tag Team Championships to The Hardys in a Full Metal Mayhem match. This was a three-way tag team match that also involved ABC. On November 29 at Turning Point, Edwards unsuccessfully challenged Nic Nemeth for the TNA World Championship. Over a month later on the December 5 episode of Impact!, The System would invoke their rematch clause to challenge The Hardys for the titles, only for the match to end via disqualification due to Alisha Edwards interfering. The System continued to beat down The Hardys, ending when they put the champions through a table. As a result, TNA later announced that The Hardys and The System would face off once again for the TNA World Tag Team Championship at Final Resolution in a tables match. At the event, Edwards and Myers failed to regain the TNA World Tag Team Championships.

On January 19, 2025, at Genesis, Edwards and Myers fought Eric Young and Steve Maclin in a losing effort. On March 14 at Sacrifice, The System teamed up with The Colóns (Eddie Colón and Orlando Colón), and lost to Joe Hendry, Matt Hardy, Elijah, Leon Slater, and Nic Nemeth in a Steel Cage 10-man tag team match. On April 17 at Unbreakable, Edwards competed in a tournament for the newly created TNA International Championship, losing to eventual winner Maclin in a three-way semifinal that also involved Ace Austin. Ten days later, at Rebellion, The System lost to Austin and The Rascalz (Trey Miguel and Zachary Wentz). On May 23 at Under Siege, Edwards defeated Cody Deaner, preventing him from getting a new contract with TNA. On June 6 at Against All Odds, The System lost to The Hardys, Slater and The Home Town Man. On July 20 at Slammiversary, The System teamed with Matt Cardona and defeated NXT's DarkState (Dion Lennox, Osiris Griffin, Saquon Shugars, and Cutler James).

At Genesis, Edwards defeated JDC in his retirement match. On the January 22, 2026 episode of Impact!, Edwards and the rest of the System attacked Moose and JDC, turning heel and kicking them out of the group. During the January 29 TNA Impact! episode, Edwards won the annual Feast or Fired, affording him an opportunity at the TNA World Heavyweight Championship. Prior to the taping of the April 2 episode of Thursday Night Impact!, TNA president Carlos Silva presented Edwards and referee Alice Lane with All-Star Awards, an award the promotion created in May 2025 to honor standout personnel. Edwards had an unscripted impromptu brawl with Mike Santana at Sacrifice as a distraction to allow medical personnel to safely bring Steve Maclin backstage after he had suffered a legitimate injury during the match. At Rebellion on April 11, Edwards failed to defeat Santana for the TNA World Championship in his Feast or Fired cash-in match.

== Personal life ==
Maher is married to fellow Impact wrestler Alisha (née Inacio), and together they have one daughter named Acelynn. Maher is close friends with fellow pro wrestlers Davey Richards, Chris Lindsey (better known as Roderick Strong), and Bryan Danielson.

== Championships and accomplishments ==
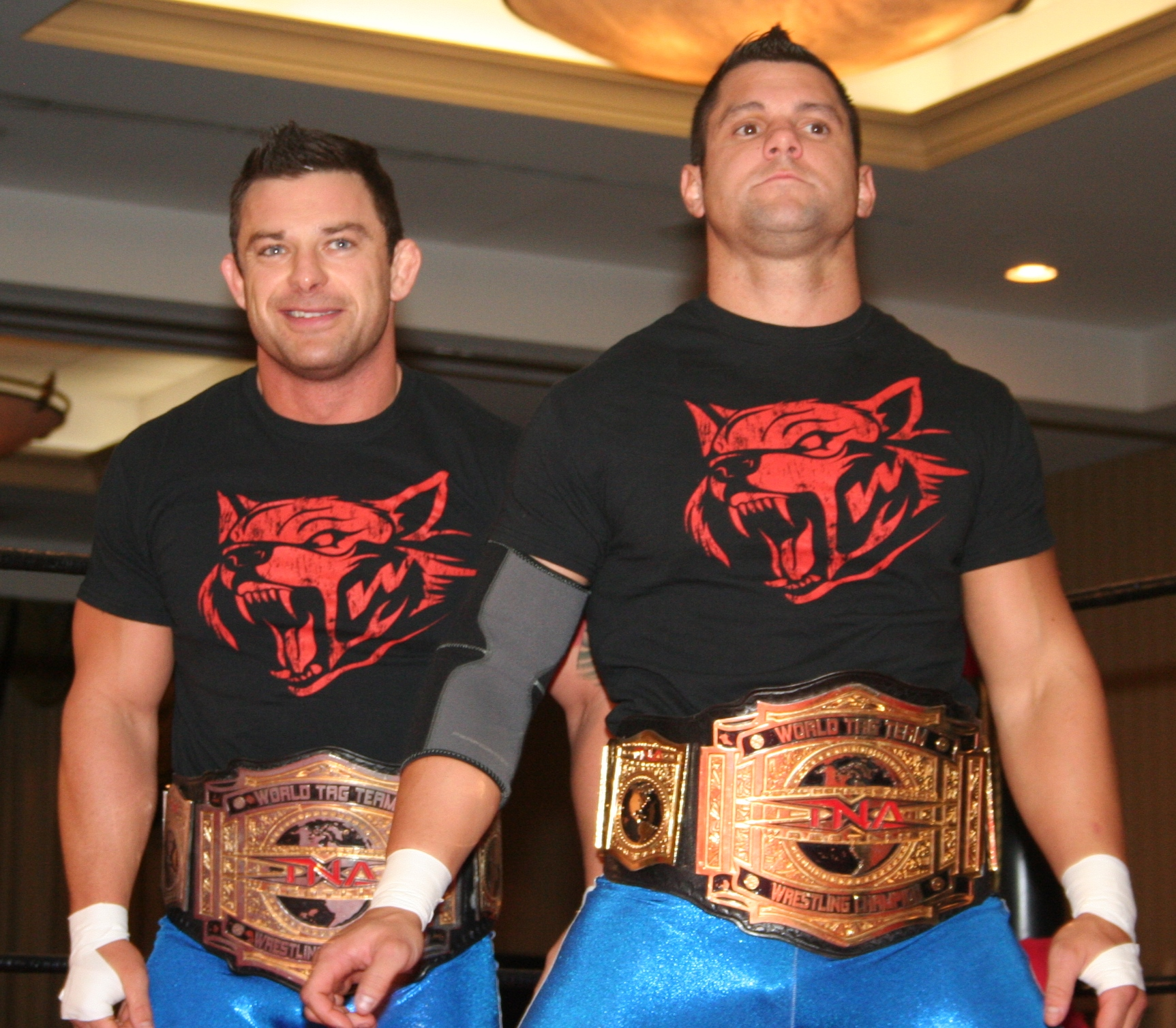
Richards and Edwards (right) are five-time TNA World Tag Team Champions

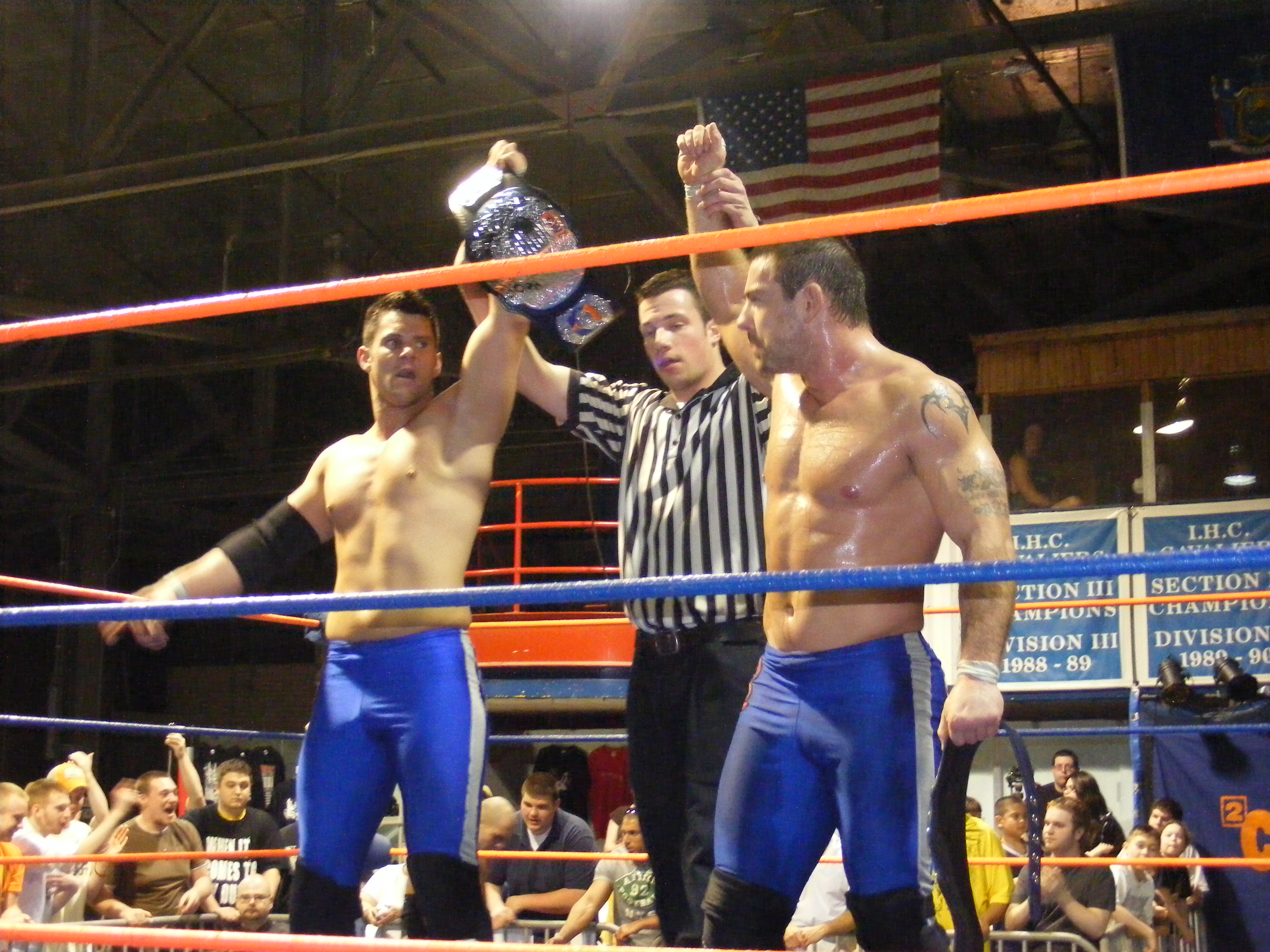
Edwards (left) with Richards (right) are former 2CW Tag Team Champions

- Assault Championship Wrestling
  - ACW Junior Heavyweight Championship (1 time)
- Create A Pro Wrestling
  - CAP Tag Team Championship (1 time) – with Brian Myers
- Dynasty Pro Wrestling
  - Dynasty Championship (1 time)
- Fight Club: Pro
  - FCP Championship (1 time)
- Millennium Wrestling Federation
  - MWF Television Championship (1 time)
- New England Championship Wrestling
  - NECW Tag Team Championship (4 times) – with D.C. Dillinger
  - Iron 8 Championship Tournament (2006, 2007)
- Premiere Wrestling Xperience
  - PWX Tag Team Championship (1 time) – with Roderick Strong
- Pro Wrestling Illustrated
  - Ranked No. 9 of the top 500 singles wrestlers in the PWI 500 in 2011
- Pro Wrestling Noah
  - GHC Heavyweight Championship (1 time)
  - Global Tag League Technique Award (2012) – with Colt Cabana
  - Nippon TV Cup Jr. Heavyweight Tag League Outstanding Performance Award (2010) – with Roderick Strong
  - NTV G+ Cup Jr. Heavyweight Tag League Fighting Spirit Award (2011) – with Delirious
  - NTV G+ Cup Jr. Heavyweight Tag League Fighting Spirit Award (2012) – with Bobby Fish
- Ring of Honor
  - ROH World Championship (1 time)
  - ROH World Television Championship (1 time, inaugural)
  - ROH World Tag Team Championship (2 times) – with Davey Richards
  - ROH World Television Championship Tournament (2010)
  - Survival of the Fittest (2010)
  - First Triple Crown Champion
- SoCal Uncensored
  - Match of the Year (2013) with Roderick Strong vs. Inner City Machine Guns (Rich Swann and Ricochet) and The Young Bucks (Matt Jackson and Nick Jackson) on August 9
- Squared Circle Wrestling
  - 2CW Tag Team Championship (1 time) – with Davey Richards
- The Wrestling Revolver
  - Revolver World Tag Team Championship (1 time) – with Davey Richards
- Top Rope Promotions
  - TRP Heavyweight Championship (1 time)
- Total Nonstop Action Wrestling/Impact Wrestling
  - Impact World/TNA World Heavyweight Championship (2 times)
  - TNA X Division Championship (2 times)
  - TNA World Tag Team Championship (7 times) – with Davey Richards (5) and Brian Myers (2)
  - TNA World Cup of Wrestling (2014) – with Bully Ray, Gunner, Eric Young and ODB
  - TNA World Cup of Wrestling (2016) – with Jeff Hardy, Jessie Godderz, Robbie E and Jade
  - Gravy Train Turkey Trot (2017) – with Allie, Richard Justice, Garza Jr., and Fallah Bahh
  - Call Your Shot Gauntlet (2019)
  - Feast or Fired (2026 – World Championship contract)
  - Eighth Triple Crown Champion
  - Impact Year End Awards (2 times)
    - Match of the Year (2020) vs. Ace Austin vs. Trey vs. Eric Young vs. Rich Swann at Slammiversary
    - Faction of the Year (2025) as The System
- WrestlePro
  - WrestlePro Silver Championship (1 time)
- Wrestling Superstar
  - Wrestling Superstar Tag Team Championship (1 time) – with Davey Richards
- Wrestling Observer Newsletter
  - Tag Team of the Year (2009) with Davey Richards
- Wrestling Federation of America
  - WFA Heavyweight Championship (2 times)
- Other accomplishments
  - Super Juniors Tournament (2013)
