= ACW Tag Team Championship (Assault) =

Professional wrestling tag team championship

Details
- Promotion: Assault Championship Wrestling
- Date established: November 30, 2001
- Date retired: March 21, 2004
Statistics
- First champions: Apollo and Gunner (Heavy Artillery)
- Final champions: Curt Daniels and Andy Jaxx (Kappa Tappa Kegga)
- Most reigns: Kappa Tappa Kegga (Andy Jaxx and Curt Daniels) (2 reigns)
- Longest reign: Kappa Tappa Kegga (287 days)
- Shortest reign: Kappa Tappa Kegga (35 days)

The ACW Tag Team Championship was the top professional wrestling tag team championship title in the American independent promotion Assault Championship Wrestling. The first champions were Heavy Artillery (Apollo and Gunner) who defeated Mind and Matter in the finals of a championship tournament held in Meriden, Connecticut on November 30, 2001. The championship was regularly defended throughout the state of Connecticut, most often in Meriden, Connecticut, until the promotion closed in early-2004.

Kappa Tappa Kegga (Curt Daniels and Andy Jaxx) holds the record for most reigns as a 2-time champion. The team's second reign, lasting 287 days, is the longest in the title's history; their first reign, which lasted only 35 days, was the shortest in the history of the title. There have been a total of 14 recognized individual champions and 7 recognized teams, who have had a combined 8 official reigns, with two vacancies.

== Title history ==
Key

No.	Overall reign number
Reign	Reign number for the specific champion
N/A	The information is not available or is unknown
Days	Number of days held
—	Used for vacated reigns in order to not count it as an official reign

=== Reigns ===
No.	Wrestlers	Reign	Date	Days held	Location	Event	Notes	Ref.
1	Apollo and Gunner (Heavy Artillery)	1	November 30, 2001	85	Meriden, CT	Live event	Defeated Mind and Matter in a tournament final.	
2	Curt Daniels and Andy Jaxx (Kappa Tappa Kegga)	1	February 23, 2002	35	Waterbury, CT	Live event		
3	Dylan Kage and Fred Curry, Jr.	1	March 30, 2002	71	Meriden, CT	Live event		
4	Redneck From Hell #1 and #2 (The Rednecks From Hell)	1	June 9, 2002	62	Meriden, CT	Live event		
5	Avil Graves and Del Tsunami	1	August 10, 2002	N/A	Pikesville, CT	Live event		
—	Vacated	—	October 2002	—	Meriden, Connecticut	N/A	Vacated when Tsunami turns on Graves during a title defense.	
6	Trent Acid and Johnny Kashmere (The Backseat Boyz)	1	November 3, 2002	131	New Britain, CT	Live event	This was a Gauntlet match involving Eddie Edwards/DC Dillanger, Bo/Jeff Douglas, The Panther Brothers, Kappa Tappa Kegga, The Rednecks From Hell, The Mutilators, and Red Hot Russ/Mike Xylas.	
—	Vacated	—	March 14, 2003	—	East Hartford, Connecticut	N/A		
7	Matt Striker and Scotty Charisma (The New Strike Force)	1	March 14, 2003	86	East Hartford, CT	Live event	Defeated Red Hot Russ and Mike Xylas to win the vacant titles.	
8	Curt Daniels and Andy Jaxx (Kappa Tappa Kegga)	2	June 8, 2003	287	Waterbury, CT	Live event		
—	Deactivated	—	March 21, 2004	—	N/A	N/A	ACW holds its last show on March 21, 2004.	
