= ACW Television Championship =

Professional wrestling championship

Details
- Promotion: Assault Championship Wrestling
- Date established: August 24, 2001
- Date retired: March 21, 2004
Statistics
- First champion: Scotty Charisma
- Most reigns: N/A
- Longest reign: Chris Hamrick (218 days)

The ACW Television Championship was a secondary professional wrestling championship title in the American independent promotion Assault Championship Wrestling. The first and only champion was Scotty Charisma who won a battle royal in Waterbury, Connecticut on July 19, 2003. The championship was regularly defended throughout the state of Connecticut, and on its weekly television series Assault TV, until the promotion closed in early 2004.

== Title history ==
#	Order in reign history
Reign	The reign number for the specific set of wrestlers listed
Event	The event in which the title was won
—	Used for vacated reigns so as not to count it as an official reign
N/A	The information is not available or is unknown
+	Indicates the current reign is changing daily

=== Reigns ===
#	Wrestlers	Reign	Date	Days held	Location	Event	Notes	Ref.
1	Scotty Charisma	1	July 19, 2003	246	Waterbury, Connecticut	Live event	Won battle royal to become the first ACW Heavyweight Champion.	
—	Deactivated	—	March 21, 2004	—	N/A	N/A	ACW holds its last show on March 21, 2004.	
