= Matt Striker =

American professional wrestler and commentator (born 1974)

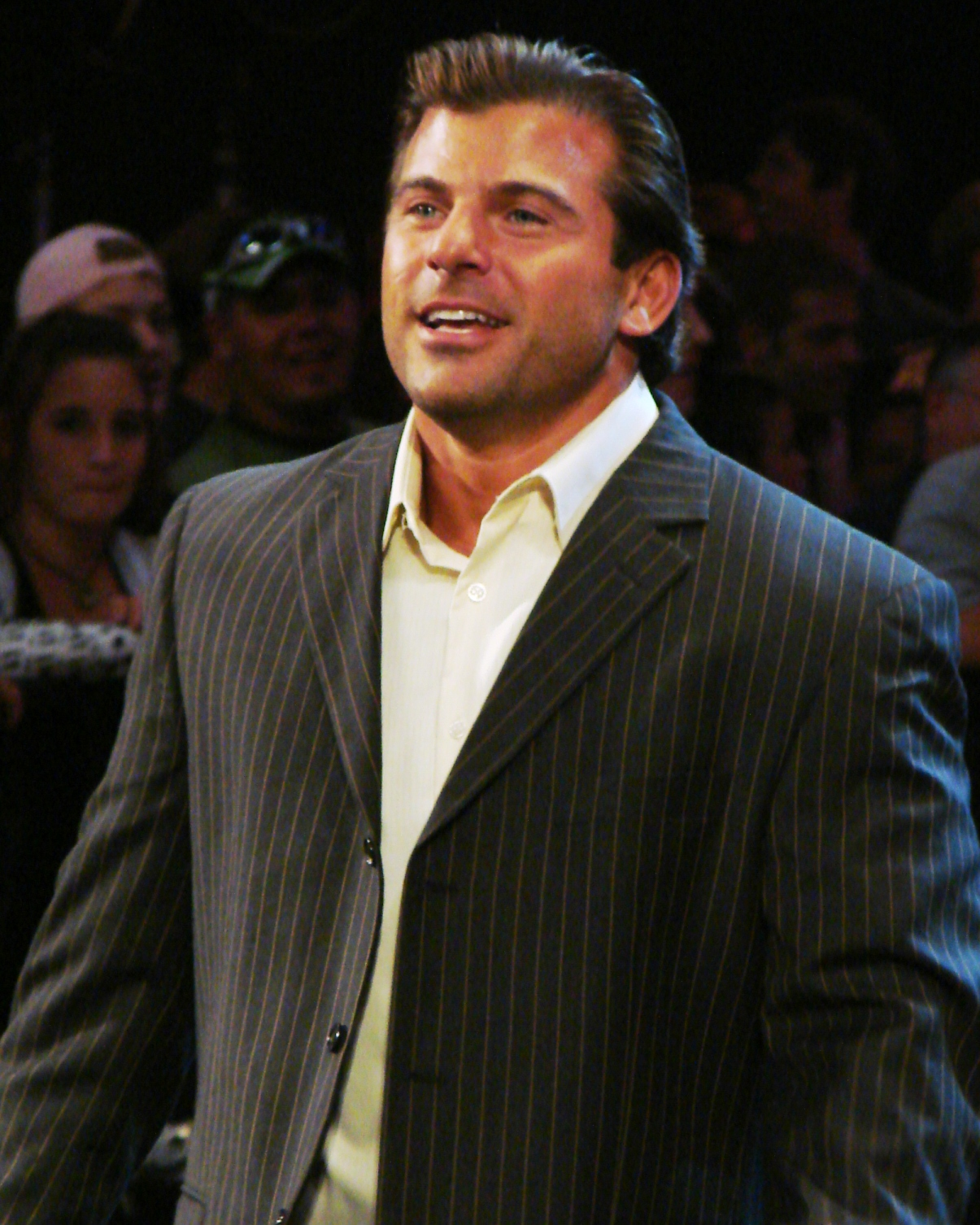
- Striker in 2008

Personal information
- Born: Matthew Kaye; June 26, 1974 (age 52) Queens, New York City, New York, U.S.

Professional wrestling career
- Ring name(s): Matt Lachey; Matt Martel; Tyler Max; Matt Striker; Muscles Marinara; Stryker; The Ultimate Striker
- Billed height: 5 ft 10 in (1.78 m)
- Billed weight: 224 lb (102 kg)
- Billed from: Bayside, New York
- Trained by: Johnny Rodz
- Debut: 2000

Matthew Kaye (born June 26, 1974) is an American professional wrestler, professional wrestling commentator, actor and former high school teacher, signed to Major League Wrestling, using the ring name Matt Striker as a commentator. During his career he has worked for WWE, Impact Wrestling, Lucha Libre AAA World Wide, and Lucha Underground.

== Professional wrestling career ==
=== Early career (2000–2005) ===
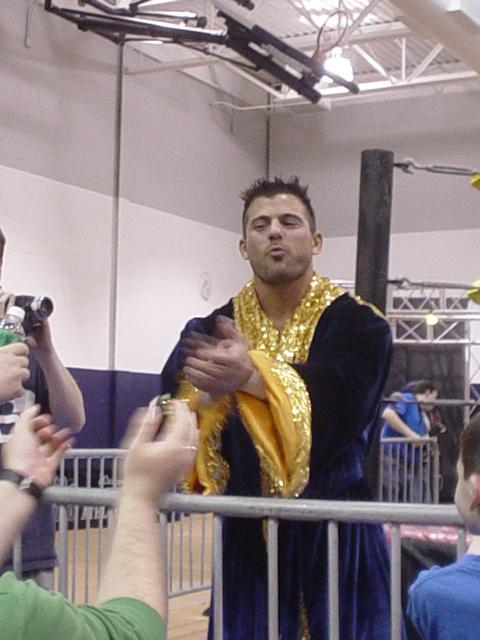
Striker competing in the independent circuit in 2005

After training with Johnny Rodz, Kaye began working on the American independent circuit. While working full-time as a teacher in 2004, he continued to wrestle during his vacation time and weekends, while also using sick days. Striker trained and worked the northeast independent circuit with notable stablemates Ricky Vega and Tim Arson. On December 16, 2004, Striker began a tour of Japan with Pro Wrestling Zero1 and was later invited back for an extended tour in early 2005. After resigning from his teaching position, he continued to wrestle around New York, and on April 30, 2005, won the New York Wrestling Connection (NYWC)'s Heavyweight Championship by defeating Mike Mondo. A few weeks later, on May 21, while still the Heavyweight Champion, he defeated Joey Braggiol to win the NYWC Interstate Championship, but only held the championship for two weeks, before losing it back to Braggiol on June 4. He made a few appearances for Ring of Honor in mid-2005, before returning to NYWC to lose the Heavyweight Championship to Jerry Lynn on July 30, after holding it for four months. He continued to wrestle for independent promotions throughout mid-2005, until he signed a contract with WWE.

=== World Wrestling Entertainment/WWE (2005–2013) ===
==== Debut and Striker's Classroom (2005–2006) ====
Kaye, using the name Matt Martel, wrestled Kurt Angle in an invitational match on the February 24, 2005 episode of SmackDown! in Philadelphia, Pennsylvania. After the revelation that Kaye was a teacher appeared in mainstream news publications, Kaye made a WWE second appearance on the July 11, 2005 episode of Raw to face Angle for a second time. His news coverage was played up by Angle, who once again defeated Kaye. The following week, Angle defeated him for the third consecutive time. Kaye, now known as Matt Striker, went on to compete on Heat and appear in WWE's developmental territory, Deep South Wrestling.

Striker developed a villainous teacher persona and beginning on December 12, hosted a segment called Matt Striker's Classroom on Raw. During the segments, he ridiculed the audience and treated the crowd as intellectual inferiors. On April 24, he participated in a six-man tag team match, in which he, Chris Masters and Shelton Benjamin were defeated by Carlito, Rob Van Dam, and Charlie Haas. During the Backlash pay-per-view, Striker hosted an edition of his Classroom segment, which ended when Eugene, who in storyline was mentally impaired, attacked Striker. Striker, in retaliation, attacked Eugene with a dictionary the following night on Raw. The feud between the two ended when Eugene gained a mentor in "Hacksaw" Jim Duggan and defeated Striker. Striker appeared only rarely on Raw throughout June and July, and his final match for the brand was on July 31, when he was quickly defeated by John Cena.

==== ECW (2006–2008) ====
At the end of August 2006, Striker left the Raw brand to join ECW, making his debut on August 23. He continued his Classroom segment on ECW, which provoked a feud with The Sandman after Striker insulted him. Striker made his in-ring debut for the brand on the September 19, 2006 episode of ECW, when his team of Mike Knox and Test were defeated by Tommy Dreamer, Sabu, and The Sandman when Test was disqualified for pushing the referee. Striker continued his feud with The Sandman until the October 17 episode of ECW, when The Sandman defeated him in a Singapore Cane on a Pole match.

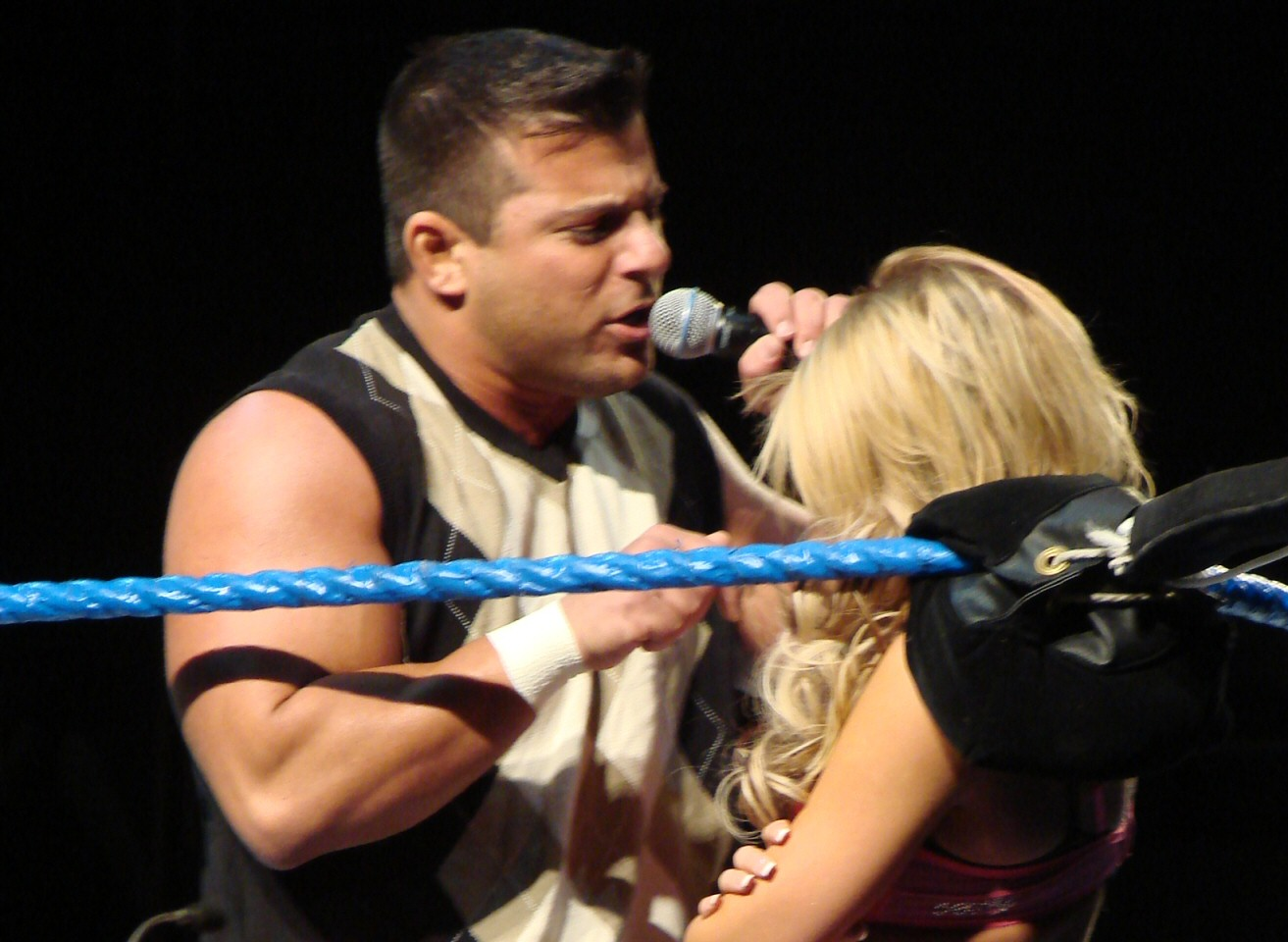
Striker (left) talking down to Kelly Kelly at an ECW live event

On February 6, Striker aligned himself with Mr. McMahon's New Breed stable, along with Elijah Burke, Kevin Thorn, and Marcus Cor Von. The New Breed immediately engaged themselves in a feud with the ECW Originals (Rob Van Dam, Tommy Dreamer, Sabu and The Sandman). At WrestleMania 23, the New Breed was defeated by the ECW Originals in an 8-man tag team match, but won a rematch on the following episode of ECW. In the midst of the feud, tension began to appear between the leader Elijah Burke and Striker, after Striker and Cor Von were defeated by the debuting Major Brothers. As a result, Striker began trying to avenge the loss to the Major Brothers and defeated Brett Major on the May 22 episode of ECW. The feud with the ECW Originals lost momentum, however, as Sabu was released from his WWE contract in mid-May, and the feud ended at the One Night Stand pay-per-view, when Striker, Cor Von, and Burke lost to Dreamer, Sandman, and CM Punk in a tables match.

On June 12, Striker was defeated by The Boogeyman in a singles match, and two weeks later, The Boogeyman attacked him during an edition of Piper's Pit. On July 10, Striker invited Boogeyman to the ring, allowing the debuting Big Daddy V to attack him. Striker then formed an alliance with Big Daddy V that lasted until March 2008, acting as Big Daddy V's manager and regularly accompanying him to the ring. In November, Striker and Big Daddy V started a feud with Kane, after Kane attacked Striker. Striker and Big Daddy V wrestled Kane in a handicap match, and the pair also aligned briefly with Mark Henry. Henry helped Big Daddy V win a match against Kane on the November 27 episode of ECW, and in return, Striker refereed a match between Henry and The Undertaker, refusing to count a pinfall against Henry.

==== Commentator and host (2008–2013) ====
As part of the 2008 WWE Supplemental Draft in June 2008, Striker was drafted back to the Raw brand. After a brief stint, Striker returned to ECW to take over duties as color commentator, debuting on August 5. Striker and his commentary partner, Todd Grisham, won the 2008 Slammy Award for the Announce Team of the Year for 2008. In April 2009, however, Grisham was moved to the SmackDown brand, and Josh Mathews debuted as the new play-by-play commentator. In addition to commentating on ECW on SyFy and ECW pay-per-view matches, Striker and Mathews represented the ECW brand on WWE Superstars every week.

On October 27, 2009, it was announced that Striker would move from commentary on ECW to SmackDown, reuniting with Grisham. The move was made to help accommodate Jim Ross, who had been taking time off to deal with his recent Bell's palsy attack. The following October, Striker and Grisham were joined by Michael Cole on SmackDown, forming a three-man announce team. Striker, however, was replaced in early February 2011 by Booker T.

Striker began hosting NXT in early 2010. He wrestled his first match in three years on the August 2, 2011 episode of NXT, teaming with Titus O'Neil in a winning effort against Derrick Bateman and Darren Young in a tag team match. He fought Young in the next two weeks, but Young emerged victorious both times. Striker later teamed up with William Regal to face Young and JTG, but Striker and Regal were unsuccessful. Meanwhile, as NXT host, Striker was frequently bullied by Curt Hawkins and Tyler Reks, The storyline included his "kidnapping" on the March 21 episode of NXT Redemption by unknown persons, later revealed to be Hawkins and Reks. During this time, Striker also continued to commentate on Superstars, with the explanation given being that to keep his kidnapping a secret, WWE hired a body double to assume Striker's duties. Striker was later "rescued" on the April 11 episode NXT Redemption. Striker ceased his role as NXT host with the conclusion of NXT Redemption.

After hosting NXT, Striker began interviewing WWE employees on Raw and SmackDown. During the summer of 2012, Striker became the host of WWE Afterburn for international broadcasts. On the October 12 SmackDown, Striker tried to interview Team Hell No (Kane and Daniel Bryan), but they both attacked him. On the October 15 episode of Raw, Striker demanded that he receive an apology and was instead forced to face Kane in his final WWE match, which Striker lost. On June 20, 2013, Striker departed WWE after the company opted to not renew his contract.

=== Independent circuit (2013–present) ===
On June 21, Striker made his first post-WWE appearance, by appearing on Family Wrestling Entertainment iPPV, FWE Rumble in Queens, New York as a color commentator. On October 21, 2013, Striker was defeated by Justin Credible in NYWC's House of Madness. After the match, Striker nailed Credible, causing him to bleed. Backstage, Striker tried to apologize but Credible cursed him out in the locker room and stormed off. In July 2013, Championship Wrestling from Hollywood (CWFH) announced Striker as the new announcer of the promotion on MAVTV. On November 2, 2013, Striker made his in ring debut for CWFH, unsuccessfully challenging Scorpio Sky for the CWFH Heritage Heavyweight Championship.

On March 14, 2014, Striker took part in German promotion Westside Xtreme Wrestling's 16 Carat Gold weekend. On March 15, Striker and Trent? defeated Hot & Spicy (Axel Dieter Jr. and Da Mack) to win the wXw World Tag Team Championship. They lost the title to Hot & Spicy the following day. From July 18 to August 2, 2014, Striker took part in Pro Wrestling Noah's 2014 NTV G+ Cup Junior Heavyweight Tag League, where he and partner Super Crazy finished with a record of two wins and two losses, failing to advance to the finals.

=== Lucha Underground (2014–2018) ===
On September 5, 2014, it was reported that Striker had signed with Lucha Underground as the lead English language announcer, alongside Vampiro. Striker and Vampiro provided English language commentary from the show's debut in 2014 to its conclusion in 2018.

=== International commentator (2015–present) ===
Striker, along with Vampiro, served as one half of the English language commentators for AAA's Lucha Libre World Cup internet pay-per-view on May 24, 2015. On August 9, 2015, Striker returned to AAA English language commentary alongside Hugo Savinovich for AAA's Triplemanía XXIII pay-per-view.

Striker and Jim Ross served as the English language commentators for New Japan Pro-Wrestling (NJPW)'s Wrestle Kingdom 9 in Tokyo Dome pay-per-view on January 4, 2015. On October 12, Striker returned to NJPW to provide English commentary on King of Pro-Wrestling, this time working alongside long-time Ring of Honor commentator Kevin Kelly. The following year, Striker returned to NJPW English commentary at Wrestle Kingdom 10 in Tokyo Dome on January 4, 2016, again working alongside Kelly, as well as NJPW wrestler Yoshitatsu.

=== Impact Wrestling (2021–2022) ===
Striker began to work as a commentator for Impact Wrestling in January 2021, along with D'Lo Brown. He left the promotion in January 2022.

== Other media ==
Matt Striker is currently the co-host of Bettor's Eye on The MLB Network.

Kaye was a child actor and had roles in the films Wise Guys and Child Savers. In 2011, Kaye appeared in the films Big Fat Gyspy Gangster and Tezz in uncredited roles.

In early 2018, he joined FITE TV. Kaye can be seen on FITE In Focus analyzing combat sports events such as MMA, Boxing and Bare Knuckle fighting.

In 2019, Kaye continued his work in the sports broadcasting industry hosting shows such as "The Fantasy Baseball Hour, "Fantasy Sports Today", "Pro Football Rewind" and "Diamond Bets."

He has also hosted Sirius XM Fantasy Sports Radio programs.

Kaye was a writer and cast member of the Labor of Love dating game show that began airing on Fox on May 21, 2020. The eight-episode series features fifteen men participating in challenges and dates that test their parenting and personal skills. Those whom contestant Kristy Katzmann finds satisfactory will continue to advance to the following episode, until the end of the series, where she will decide – with the help of the show's host, actress Kristin Davis – whether to choose one of the men to start a family with or not.

=== Filmography ===
Year	Title	Role
1986	Wise Guys	Harry Valentini Jr.
1988	The Child Saver	Marty
2011	Big Fat Gypsy Gangster	Riot Officer (uncredited)
2012	Tezz	CO19 Officer (uncredited)
2017	After School Special	Detective Lockhorn
2019	Sensory Perception	Marco

== Personal life ==
Kaye earned a Bachelor's degree in History and went on to obtain a Master's degree with distinction (3.9GPA or higher) in educational psychology. He began working as a high school teacher after college. He once worked part-time as a substitute, filling in when other teachers were on leave. In mid-2004, he was hired full-time as a social studies teacher at Benjamin N. Cardozo High School in Queens, New York, but wrestled part-time during his vacation time and on weekends.

Kaye played semi-pro hockey and has studied jiu-jitsu, catch wrestling, and boxing. He has quoted scriptures on air from various sacred texts including, Torah, Quran, and the Vedas.

== Championships and accomplishments ==
- Assault Championship Wrestling
  - ACW Tag Team Championship (1 time) – with Scotty Charisma
- Coastal Championship Wrestling
  - CCW Tag Team Championship (1 time) – with Will Austin
- DDT Pro-Wrestling
  - Ironman Heavymetalweight Championship (2 times)
- East Coast Wrestling Association
  - ECWA Tag Team Championship (1 time) – with Ace Darling
- Jersey Championship Wrestling
  - JCW Tag Team Championship (1 time) – with Ace Darling
- High Impact Wrestling Canada
  - HIW Wildside Provincial Championship (1 time)
- LDN Wrestling
  - LDN Capital Wrestling Championship (1 time)
- New York Wrestling Connection
  - NYWC Heavyweight Championship (1 time)
  - NYWC Interstate Championship (1 time)
  - NYWC Tag Team Championship (1 time) – with Rob Eckos
- Premier Wrestling Federation
  - PWF Tag Team Championship (1 time) – with Josh Daniels
- Pro Wrestling Illustrated
  - Ranked No. 166 of the top 500 singles wrestlers in the PWI 500 in 2006
- Pro Wrestling Noah
  - NTV G+ Cup Junior Heavyweight Tag League Technique Award (2014) – with Super Crazy
- Total Professional Wrestling
  - TPW Light Heavyweight Championship (1 time)
  - TPW Tag Team Championship (1 time) – with Red Flair
- USA Pro Wrestling
  - USA Pro Tag Team Championship (2 times) – with Simon Diamond
- West Coast Wrestling Connection
  - WCWC Pacific Northwest Championship (1 time)
- Westside Xtreme Wrestling
  - wXw World Tag Team Championship (1 time) – with Trent?
- World Wrestling Entertainment
  - Slammy Award (1 time)
    - Announce Team of the Year (2008) – with Todd Grisham
- Wrestling Observer Newsletter
  - Best Television Announcer (2008)

Preceded by Josh Mathews	Impact! lead announcer 2021–2022	Succeeded by Tom Hannifan
