= ACW Junior Heavyweight Championship =

Professional wrestling championship

Details
- Promotion: Assault Championship Wrestling
- Date established: February 23, 2002
- Date retired: March 21, 2004
Statistics
- First champion(s): Tiger Mulligan
- Most reigns: Jim Nastic (2 reigns)
- Longest reign: Eddie Edwards (211 days)
- Shortest reign: Jim Nastic (24 days)

The ACW Junior Heavyweight Championship was a secondary professional wrestling championship title in the American independent promotion Assault Championship Wrestling. The first-ever champion was Tiger Mulligan who defeated Shockwav, and Frankie Starz in a Four Corners match in Meriden, Connecticut on August 24, 2001. The championship was regularly defended throughout the state of Connecticut, most often in Meriden, Connecticut, but also in New Britain and Waterbury, Connecticut until the promotion closed in early-2004.

Jim Nastic holds the record for most reigns as a 2-time champion. At 211 days, Eddie Edwards' reign is the longest in the title's history. Jim Nastic's first reign, which lasted only 24 days, was the shortest in the history of the title. Overall, there have been 8 reigns shared between 7 wrestlers, with one vacancy.

== Title history ==
#	Order in reign history
Reign	The reign number for the specific set of wrestlers listed
Event	The event in which the title was won
—	Used for vacated reigns so as not to count it as an official reign
N/A	The information is not available or is unknown
+	Indicates the current reign is changing daily

=== Reigns ===
#	Wrestlers	Reign	Date	Days held	Location	Event	Notes	Ref.
1	Tiger Mulligan	1	February 23, 2002	35	Waterbury, Connecticut	Live event	Mulligan defeated Shockwave and Frankie Starz in a four corners match to become the first ACW Junior Heavyweight Champion.	
2	Scotty Charisma	1	March 30, 2002	113	Meriden, Connecticut	Live event		
3	Jim Nastic	1	July 21, 2002	24	Waterbury, Connecticut	Live event		
4	Chi Chi Cruz	1	August 14, 2002	N/A	Meriden, Connecticut	Live event		
—	Vacated	—	October 2002	—	N/A	N/A	The championship is vacated when Chi Chi Cruz is stripped of the title.	
5	Del Tsunami	1	November 3, 2002	189	New Britain, Connecticut	Live event	Defeated Jim Nastic, Abunai, and Scotty Charisma in a four corners match.	
6	Jim Nastic	2	May 11, 2003	69	Waterbury, Connecticut	Live event		
7	Eddie Edwards	1	July 19, 2003	211	Waterbury, Connecticut	Live event		
8	Abunai	1	February 15, 2004	35	New Britain, Connecticut	Live event		
—	Deactivated	—	March 21, 2004	—	N/A	N/A	ACW holds its last show on March 21, 2004.	

== Combined reigns ==
Rank	Wrestler	Reigns	Combined days
1	Eddie Edwards	1	211
2	Del Tsunami	1	189
3	Scotty Charisma	1	113
4	Jim Nastic	2	93
5	Chi Chi Cruz	1	48-78
6	Abunai	1	35
6	Tiger Mulligan	1	35
