= ACW Heavyweight Championship =

Professional wrestling championship

Details
- Promotion: Assault Championship Wrestling
- Date established: August 24, 2001
- Date retired: March 21, 2004
Statistics
- First champion: Chris Hamrick
- Most reigns: Dylan Kage (2 reigns)
- Longest reign: Chris Hamrick (218 days)
- Shortest reign: Jeff Rocket (4 days)

The ACW Heavyweight Championship was the top professional wrestling championship title in the American independent promotion Assault Championship Wrestling. The first-ever champion was Chris Hamrick who won the title in a championship tournament held in Meriden, Connecticut on August 24, 2001. The championship was regularly defended throughout the state of Connecticut, most often in Meriden, Connecticut, until the promotion closed in early-2004.

Dylan Kage holds the record for most reigns as the only 2-time champion. At 217 days, Chris Hamrick's reign is the longest in the title's history. Jeff Rocket's reign, which lasted only 4 days before vacating due to injury, was the shortest in the history of the title. Overall, there have been 9 reigns shared between 8 wrestlers, with one vacancy.

== Title history ==
#	Order in reign history
Reign	The reign number for the specific set of wrestlers listed
Event	The event in which the title was won
—	Used for vacated reigns so as not to count it as an official reign
N/A	The information is not available or is unknown
+	Indicates the current reign is changing daily

=== Reigns ===
#	Wrestlers	Reign	Date	Days held	Location	Event	Notes	Ref.
1	Chris Hamrick	1	August 24, 2001	218	Meriden, Connecticut	Live event	Won tournament to become the first ACW Heavyweight Champion.	
2	Slyk Wagner Brown	1	March 30, 2002	71	Meriden, Connecticut	Live event		
3	Balls Mahoney	1	June 9, 2002	62	Meriden, Connecticut	Live event		
4	Jeff Rocket	1	August 10, 2002	4	Pikesville, Connecticut	Live event		
—	Vacated	—	August 14, 2002	—	Meriden, Connecticut	N/A	The championship is vacated when Jeff Rocket suffers an injury.	
5	Dylan Kage	1	August 14, 2002	109	Meriden, Connecticut	Live event	Defeated Ron Zombie in a singles match.	
6	Paul E. Normous	1	December 1, 2002	103	New Britain, Connecticut	Live event		
7	Johnny Thunder	1	March 14, 2003	149	East Hartford, Connecticut	Live event		
8	Dylan Kage	2	August 10, 2003	189	Meriden, Connecticut	Live event		
9	Ron Zombie	1	February 15, 2004	35	New Britain, Connecticut	Reload (2004)		
—	Deactivated	—	March 21, 2004	—	N/A	N/A	ACW holds its last show on March 21, 2004.	
