= Mr. Scott Wright =

American professional wrestler and bodybuilder

Personal information
- Born: Scott Wright; August 8, 1977 (age 49) Sloatsburg, New York

Professional wrestling career
- Ring name(s): Mr. Scott Wright; Scotty Charisma; Scotty Wright
- Billed height: 6 ft 0 in (1.83 m)
- Billed weight: 205 lb (93 kg)
- Billed from: New York City, New York
- Trained by: Gino Caruso; Jason Knight; James Maritato
- Debut: September 6, 2001

Scott Wright (born August 8, 1977) is an American professional wrestler and bodybuilder, better known by his ring name, Mr. Scott Wright. He is also known for his appearances under the ring name Scotty Charisma.

== Early life ==
Prior to wrestling, Wright worked in the fitness industry for New York Sports Clubs in Danbury, Connecticut and Nanuet, New York. He has held personal training certifications through both the National Academy of Sports Medicine and the Aerobics and Fitness Association of America as well as a certification as nutritional specialist for Apex Fitness. Coinciding with his wrestling career, Wright has been a seventh and eighth grade history teacher at Suffern Middle School in New York. He also began competing as a bodybuilder in 1998 and continued to do so throughout his career as a wrestler.

== Professional wrestling career ==
=== Early career (2001–2005) ===
After training in East Coast Professional Wrestling's school at Lake Hiawatha, New Jersey, Wright made his wrestling debut under the ring name Scotty Charisma in 2001. He would wrestle consistently for the ECPW promotion all throughout his career and regularly trained at their facility. In May 2003 Charisma won the ECPW Jr. Heavyweight Championship from rival Damian Adams at a fundraiser show at Suffern High School in New York. Charisma also became a regular for the Connecticut based Assault Championship Wrestling, where he gained much success as he won the promotion's Junior Heavyweight Championship once, Tag Team Championship once with Matt Striker and became the promotion's first and only Television Champion. After ACW folded in 2004, Charisma returned to the independent circuit before he made his East Coast Wrestling Association debut on September 18, 2004 in a victory over Handsome Johnny aka current WWE star Hanson Soon after debuting, he won the promotion's Heavyweight Championship after defeating then-champion R. J. Brewer, Mike Kruel, Andrew Ryker and Xavier in a five-way elimination match on February 12, 2005. Charisma later lost the ECWA title to Fred Sampson aka former WWE star Darren Young on November 5, 2005.

=== World Wrestling Entertainment (2005–2007) ===
Scott Wright's first major appearance on WWE television came from the Pepsi Arena in Albany, NY on March 3, 2005 when he was the local wrestler chosen for the Kurt Angle Invitational Challenge. The sketch was a swerve as Shawn Michaels would attack Angle from behind while disguised as a camera man before the match could begin. This appearance aired on the March 5, 2005 edition of Smackdown and was included in the Wrestlemania 21 highlight buildup for the Angle/Michaels match. Ironically, four months later Wright was chosen to play one of Kurt Angle’s bodyguards who carried his gold medal to the ring on the July 18, 2005 episode of Raw from the Meadowlands Izod Center. He remained at ringside for Angle’s exciting match against Matt Striker who was billed as the local wrestler chosen for the Kurt Angle Challenge. Wright, as Scotty Charisma, made his World Wrestling Entertainment in ring debut on the December 13, 2005 episode of Velocity, where he teamed with his ECWA rival Arch Kincaid in a losing effort against Paul London and Brian Kendrick. A few weeks later on January 2, 2006, Wright teamed with Fred Sampson in a losing effort to The Heart Throbs at the Meadowlands Izod Center in East Rutherford, New Jersey in a tag team match taped for Heat. The next night, both Charisma and Sampson took part in another tag team match at the Wachovia Arena in Wilkes Barre, Pennsylvania, which they lost to The Dicks (James and Chad) on Velocity. The following week Wright and Danny Doring wrestled the FBI (Vito and Nunzio) in a WWE Smackdown Dark Match at the Wells Fargo Center in Philadelphia, PA. Wright's first singles match in WWE occurred on the June 13, 2006 tapings of SmackDown! at the Sovereign Bank Arena in Trenton, NJ, which he lost to Vito. Wright would have three other WWE singles matches in the Summer of 2006 facing Umaga on the July 3rd episode of Monday Night Raw at the Wells Fargo Center in Philadelphia, the debuting Elijah Burke at the July 31st Supershow Smackdown taping at the Meadowlands Izod Center, and Sylvan Grenier at the September 12th Smackdown taping at the DCU Center in Worcester, Massachusetts.

Wright would also appear on the November 27, 2006 episode of Raw, playing the role of a UPS delivery man in a backstage segment where Triple H and Shawn Michaels trapped the Spirit Squad in a crate to be shipped to "OVW" (Ohio Valley Wrestling). This was the last time the Spirit Squad was seen on WWE television. On the December 18, 2006 episode of Raw, Wright played the role of a secret service man who was protecting a George W. Bush impersonator in the ring during a segment with Cryme Tyme (Shad Gaspard & JTG) at the MCI Center in Washington DC. Scotty Charisma's last WWE match was on May 7, 2007 during a taping for HEAT at the Bryce Jordan Center on the campus of Penn State University when he teamed with independent standout Xavier in a loss to "Hacksaw" Jim Duggan and Eugene in a tag team match. Wright would continue to make cameo appearances on WWE television until April 2009, one of which was playing the ill-fated camera man that was kicked in the face by Kane during the CM Punk/Batista match during the July 2008 Great American Bash Pay Per View from the Nassau Coliseum in Uniondale, NY.

=== Independent circuit (2006–2013) ===
On March 1, 2008, Charisma, now renamed to Mr. Scott Wright, won the ECWA Title for the second time on March 1, 2008 after defeating Aden Chambers.[2] Wright would go on to hold the title for just over a month before losing it to Glen Osbourne on April 5.[5] One of the major highlights of Wright's career was being selected to compete in the 2010 "Super Eight" Tournament in on July 10, 2010 in Newark, Delaware. Wright was eliminated in the first round by "U-Gene" Nick Dinsmore.[6]

On July 13, 2012, Scotty won the D2W International Title defeating General Bobby Lee Walker and was named 2012 D2W "Most Popular Wrestler". Although he is not officially retired from professional wrestling, Wright's last match was on June 1, 2013 in Newark, Delaware, losing an Eight-Men Tag in ECWA.[13]

== Personal life ==
In July 2004, Wright was introduced to fitness model and personal trainer Kathleen Schreeck. On July 14, 2006, the couple were married at Sacred Heart Church in Suffern, New York, and the service was attended by many wrestlers from the wrestling community. On March 15, 2009, the Wrights gave birth to their first child, Sophia. On May 3, 2010, the Wrights gave birth to their second daughter, Isabelle. On October 11, 2011 Scott and Kathy welcomed their third daughter Angelina. On May 4, 2016 the Wright's welcomed their son Jackson Carl into the world. On February 1, 2019, Scott and Kathy had their fifth child Alexis Doreen. The Wright family currently resides in Scott's hometown of Sloatsburg, New York.

Wright received a bachelor's degree in justice and law administration and later received his master's degree in history, both from Western Connecticut State University. He was a walk-on basketball player for three years at Western Connecticut and finally earned his varsity letter during his junior year. A broken tailbone sidelined him during the preseason of his senior year, and Wright was offered a position as a student coach by head coach Bob Campbell. He was immediately put in charge of strength and conditioning and was also given recruiting duties. Wright remained an assistant basketball coach for Western Connecticut State University for four more seasons before leaving the college in March 1998.

Wright returned home to Suffern High School in New York where he served as Freshmen Boys Basketball Coach in 1998–99 and JV Boys Basketball Coach from 1999 to 2001. From 2007 to 2013 Wright assisted with the girls' program at Suffern High School.

In April 2013, Wright was named Varsity Boys Basketball Coach at Suffern High School in New York. In his eight years as head coach, the Mounties have a record of 95–64 including three straight league championships. Notable former players: Chris Torres, Sienna University.

== Championships and accomplishments ==
=== Bodybuilding ===
- 2001 ANBC U.S. Nationals – 8th in the USA (Open Tall Class)
- 2005 NBI Natural Tri-State – 1st (Novice Division)

=== Professional wrestling ===
- Assault Championship Wrestling
  - ACW Junior Heavyweight Championship (1 time)
  - ACW Television Championship (1 time)
  - ACW Tag Team Championship (1 time) – with Matt Striker
- D2W Pro Wrestling
  - D2W International Championship (1 time)
- Declaration of Independents
  - DOI ranked him #149 of the 250 best singles wrestlers in the DOI Top 250 in 2004
- East Coast Professional Wrestling
  - ECPW Light Heavyweight Championship (1 time)
- East Coast Wrestling Association
  - ECWA Heavyweight Championship (2 times)
- Pro Wrestling Illustrated
  - PWI ranked him #341 of the 500 best singles wrestlers in the PWI 500 in 2005
