= Assault Championship Wrestling =

American independent wrestling promotion

- Acronym: ACW
- Founded: 2000
- Style: American Wrestling
- Headquarters: Milford PA
- Owner: Jason Knight (2001- Current)
- Parent: Jason Knight Productions
- Sister: New England Championship Wrestling
- Formerly: Acid Pro Wrestling
- Website: AssaultWrestling.com; AcidWrestling.com

Assault Championship Wrestling is an American independent wrestling promotion originally based in Connecticut, more recently Milford, PA, and promoted by Jason Knight, a pro wrestler and manager, best known for his time in the ECW. The first major independent promotion to operate in Connecticut, Assault Championship Wrestling became important on the independent circuit particularly after the close of Extreme Championship Wrestling in 2002 and featured many former ECW veterans including Danny Doring, Kid Kash, Justin Credible, Little Guido, Tony DeVito, Balls Mahoney, John Kronus, Francine and Joel Gertner who acted as its commissioner.

New England Championship Wrestling, a rival promotion, often held inter-promotional events as well as allowing its champions to defend their titles at ACW cards. They also had a working arraignment with Knight's wrestling dojo. A number of independent wrestlers also made frequent appearances including Matt Stryker, Julio Dinero, Wagner Brown, Matthew Kaye, Homicide, Jeff Rocker, Scotty Charisma and The Backseat Boyz (Trent Acid and Johnny Kashmere). Popular female wrestlers included Mercedes Martinez, Becky Bayless, April Hunter, Nikki Roxx, Talia Madison, Ana Rocha and Angel Orsini.

ACW was re-launched by Knight on Aug 12, 2023 in Williamstown NJ and is currently running primary in New Jersey, Pennsylvania, and returning to Connecticut in 2024.

== History ==
Originally established under Acid Pro Wrestling, the promotion began operating in central Connecticut in early 2000 and held its first supercard, The Best Things In Life Are Free!, in Waterbury, Connecticut on May 26, 2000. It also held its first televised event in Waterbury featuring Angel Orsini, Joel Gertner and Jason Knight on November 12, 2000.

The promotion would continue holding shows in Plainville, Southington, Naugatuck and Meriden, Connecticut during 2001 with appearances by Homicide, the F.B.I., Francine, Christian York, Chris Hamrick, Julio Dinero, New Jack, Chris Candido and Tammy Lynn Sytch. On April 8, 2001, an Evening Gown match between Foxxy Dreams and Missy Hyatt took place at an ACW show in East Hartford. Hyatt was originally scheduled to face another female wrestler, however Dreams took her place when Hyatt's opponent did not arrive. Although Foxxy Dreams technically defeated Hyatt after tearing off her gown, the match official Joel Gertner stopped the match and awarded the win to Hyatt deciding to change the stipulations for the winner to be the first to lose her dress.

Knight had originally been the booker for the promotion, however he left to start a rival promotion after a falling out with the owners. After Knight took over the promotion in August 2001, the promotion was renamed Assault Championship Wrestling and followed up on the success of the previous supercard with Second Wave and Hell to Pay later that year.

In 2002, the promotion expanded holding events in New Britain and North Haven, Connecticut. The promotion also began The House of Pain Dojo in nearby Waterbury, Connecticut. On August 9, 2002, Knight and several ACW wrestlers were at New England Championship Wrestling's second annual Birthday Bash at the Goodtimes Emporium in Somerville, Massachusetts. Knight, who was a guest commentator for iMassRadio.com, was the first ever guest celebrity to attend the event along with Traci Brooks. Students from the House of Pain Pro Wrestling school were also at the event.

The following year, its main heel stable La Familia, led by assistant ACW booker Mike E. Milano, appeared on several shows with Connecticut Championship Wrestling. Although speculated that their arrival might lead to an "invasion" storyline, ACW abruptly stopped future appearances due to Knight's refusal to work with certain people in charge at CCW.

In early-May, an unexpected cancellation of an outdoor show as well as its website going offline prompted internet rumors that the promotion was shutting down. This was denied by officials, specifically wrestler and part-time road agent Bulldog Blanski, who explained the show had been originally canceled due to rain and that the venue had decided to cancel its next show the following week on Mother's Day. He further explained that the website had been changing servers and announced the promotion would continue holding shows with the next event being held at Riders Cafe in Waterbury on June 6, 2003.

However, the company began suffering financial trouble during its last year and held its last event in New Britain on March 21, 2004. The card featured Chi Chi Cruz, Dances with Dudley, Tony DeVito, Scotty Charisma, Mercedes Martinez and Justin Credible vs Kid Kash in the main event.

Knight's wrestling school remained open however and, in late 2004, several former ACW mainstays including Bulldog Blanski and Mike E. Milano decided to start another promotion, Defiant Pro Wrestling. The promotion was initially successful, but ran into a bump in the road causing an 8-month hiatus. Jason Knight appeared at its return show Burning Bridges in Southington, Connecticut on November 19, 2005, as the new Commissioner of the company. Knight would remain with DPW through 2008 when he and Milano parted ways once again.

In August 2008 after Knight purchased DPW's Proving Grounds Dojo from Milano, ACW tried to relaunch in Waterbury, CT and started training a few wrestlers. They managed to only have 2 shows with very little attendance. They went bankrupt for a second time in December 2008, also losing the building, which has since become a church.

On March 12, 2023 Jason Knight announced the re-launch of Assault Championship Wrestling, on his official Facebook page & website.

== Championships ==
| Championship: | Last Champion(s): | Active From: | Active Till: | Notes: |
|---|---|---|---|---|
| ACW Heavyweight Championship | Ron Zombie | February 15, 2004 | March 21, 2004 | |
| ACW Junior Heavyweight Championship | Abunai | February 15, 2004 | March 21, 2004 | |
| ACW Television Championship | Scotty Charisma | July 19, 2003 | March 21, 2004 | Won battle royal to become first champion. |
| ACW Hardcore Championship | Jamie Pain | September 7, 2003 | March 21, 2004 | |
| ACW Great American Championship | Tony Devito | June 8, 2003 | March 21, 2004 | Defeated Jeff Rocker in tournament final to win the vacant title. |
| ACW Tag Team Championship | Kappa Tappa Kegga (Andy Jaxx and Curt Daniels) | June 8, 2003 | March 21, 2004 | |
