= ECWA Women's Super 8 Tournament =

The ECWA Women's Super 8 Tournament is an annual professional wrestling tournament held by the East Coast Wrestling Association (ECWA) annually since 2014. The tournament is contested by eight female wrestlers in a one-night single-elimination format. The tournament was originally called the ECWA Super 8 ChickFight Tournament until being rebranded in 2019.

== History ==
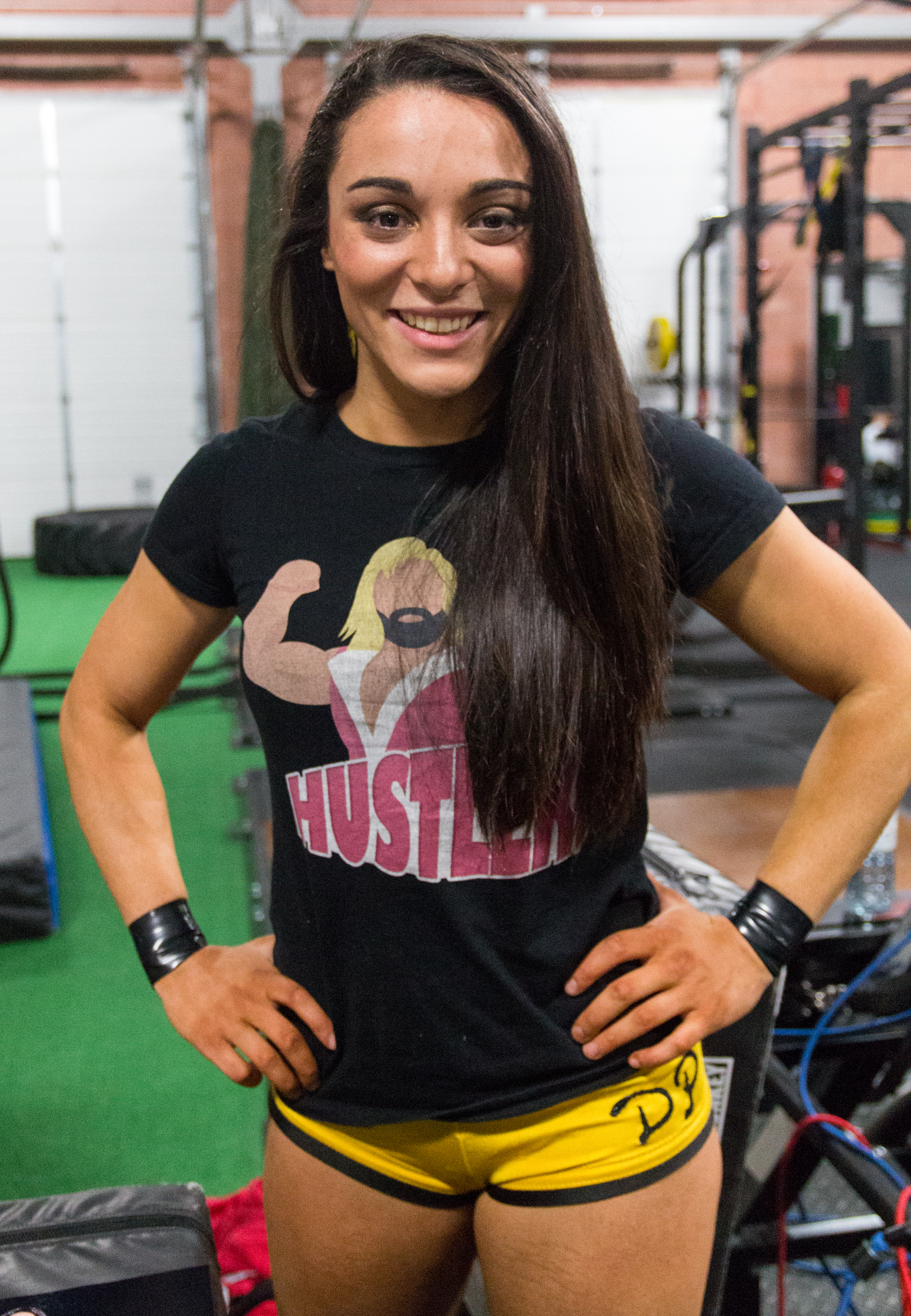
Deonna Purrazzo is a record two-time winner of the ECWA Women's Super 8 Tournament

The Super 8 Tournament was first held on October 11, 2014, and was won by Tessa Blanchard. Deonna Purrazzo became the first wrestler in 20 years at ECWA to win the tournament back-to-back between the year 2015 and 2016, including the ECWA Super 8 Tournament. In 2021, the tournament was renamed to the Women's Super 8 Tournament.

=== List of past winners ===
Year	Winner
2014	Tessa Blanchard
2015	Deonna Purrazzo
2016	Deonna Purrazzo
2017	Karen Q
2019	Quinn McKay
2021	Megan Bayne
2022	Erica Leigh

== Past tournament results ==
=== 2014 ===
ECWA Super 8 ChickFight Tournament
- Date: October 11, 2014
- City: Carney's Point, New Jersey
- Venue: YMCA of Carney's Point

The inaugural Super 8 ChickFight Tournament took part on October 11, 2014, at the YMCA of Carney's Point in Carney's Point, New Jersey. In the tournament finals, Tessa Blanchard defeated Jenny Rose to win the tournament and the vacant ECWA Women's Championship.

Quarterfinals
1	Tessa Blanchard	Pin
8	Tina San Antonio	7:01
4	Renee Michelle	Pin
5	Candy Cartwright	6:38
2	Jenny Rose	Sub
7	Annie Social	7:15
3	Gabby Gilbert	Sub
6	Nikki Addams	8:43

Semifinals
Renee Michelle	6:20
Tessa Blanchard	Pin
Gabby Gilbert	7:13
Jenny Rose	Sub

Final
Jenny Rose	8:58
Tessa Blanchard	Pin

=== 2015 ===
ECWA 2nd Annual Super 8 ChickFight Tournament
- Date: October 17, 2015
- City: Woodbury Heights, New Jersey
- Venue: Woodbury Heights Community Center

The second Super 8 ChickFight Tournament took part on October 17, 2015, at the Woodbury Heights Community Center in Woodbury Heights, New Jersey. In the tournament finals, Deonna Purrazzo defeated the inaugural tournament winner Tessa Blanchard to win the tournament and the vacated ECWA Women's Championship.

Quarterfinals
1	Tessa Blanchard
8	Daysia Danielle
4	Kennadi Brink
5	Savannah Evans
2	Deonna Purrazzo	Sub
7	Miranda Vionette
3	Brittany Blake
6	Terra Calaway

Semifinals
Kennadi Brink
Tessa Blanchard
Brittany Blake
Deonna Purrazzo	Sub

Final
Tessa Blanchard
Deonna Purrazzo	Sub

=== 2016 ===
ECWA 3rd Annual Super 8 ChickFight Tournament
- Date: October 22, 2016
- City: Woodbury Heights, New Jersey
- Venue: Woodbury Heights Community Center

The third Annual Super 8 ChickFight Tournament took part on October 22, 2016, at the Woodbury Heights Community Center in Woodbury Heights, New Jersey. In the tournament finals, Deonna Purrazzo defeated Karen Q, becoming the first person in 20 years to win the Super 8 Tournament back-to-back.

Quarterfinals
1	Kiera Hogan	Pin
8	Maria Manic
4	Karen Q	Sub
5	Aja Perera
2	Deonna Purrazzo	Sub
7	Tasha Steelz
3	Britt Baker	Pin
6	Faye Jackson (Note: Faye Jackson replaced the injured Rachael Ellering.)

Semifinals
Britt Baker
Karen Q	Sub
Kiera Hogan
Deonna Purrazzo

Final
Karen Q
Deonna Purrazzo

=== 2017 ===
ECWA 4th Annual Super 8 ChickFight Tournament
- Date: October 21, 2017
- City: Woodbury Heights, New Jersey
- Venue: Woodbury Heights Community Center

The fourth Annual Super 8 ChickFight Tournament took part on October 21, 2017, at the Woodbury Heights Community Center in Woodbury Heights, New Jersey. During the semifinals, Karen Q and Santana Garrett wrestled to a time limit draw. As a result, the two advanced to the finals where they competed in a three-way match, which also involved Deonna Purrazzo. In the end, Karen submitted Purrazzo with the Boston crab to win the tournament and the vacant ECWA Women's Championship.

Quarterfinals
1	Deonna Purrazzo	Pin
8	Allie Recks
4	Skylar	Pin
5	Kaitlin Diemond
2	Karen Q	Pin
7	Christina Marie	Pin
3	Santana Garrett	Pin
6	Samantha Heights

Semifinals
Deonna Purrazzo	Pin
Skylar
Karen Q	Draw
Santana Garrett

Final
Karen Q	Sub
Deonna Purrazzo and Santana Garrett

=== 2019 ===
ECWA Super 8 ChickFight Tournament 2019
- Date: March 16, 2019
- City: New Castle, Delaware
- Venue: Asbury United Methodist Church

The fifth Super 8 ChickFight Tournament 2019 took part on March 16, 2019, at the Asbury United Methodist Church in New Castle, Delaware. During the tournament, the ECWA Women's Championship changed hands multiple times. During the quarterfinals, Scarlett Bordeaux defeated the reigning champion Miss Jasmine to win the title. In the semifinals, Bordeaux lost the title to Gabby Ortiz. At the end, at the tournament finals, Quinn McKay defeated Ortiz to win the tournament and the title.

Quarterfinals
1	Quinn McKay
8	Zoe Skye
4	Nikki Addams
5	Sammi Pandora
2	Gabby Ortiz
7	Gemma Cross
3	Scarlett Bordeaux
6	Miss Jasmine

Semifinals
Quinn McKay
Nikki Addams
Gabby Ortiz
Scarlett Bordeaux

Final
Quinn McKay
Gabby Ortiz

=== 2021 ===
ECWA Women's Super 8 Tournament 2021
- Date: July 31, 2021
- City: Paulsboro, New Jersey
- Venue: Arena Monster Factory LLC
- Attendance: ca. 100

The sixth tournament, which was renamed to Women's Super 8 Tournament, took part on July 31, 2021, at the Arena Monster Factory LLC in Paulsboro, New Jersey. Megan Bayne won the tournament after defeating Ashley D'Amboise in the finals.

Quarterfinals
1	Tina San Antonio
8	Erica Leigh	11:01
4	Ashley D'Amboise
5	Adena Steele	3:55
2	Gabby Ortiz
7	Vicious Vicki	6:27
3	Megan Bayne
6	Damaris Dawkins	9:05

Semifinals
Tina San Antonio	6:53
Ashley D'Amboise
Gabby Ortiz	6:47
Megan Bayne

Final
Ashley D'Amboise	8:55
Megan Bayne

=== 2022 ===
ECWA Women's Super 8 Tournament 2022
- Date: August 6, 2022
- City: Paulsboro, New Jersey
- Venue: Arena Monster Factory LLC

The seventh Women's Super 8 Tournament 2022 took part on August 6, 2022, at the Arena Monster Factory LLC in Paulsboro, New Jersey, which aired on ECWA'S YouTube channel. Erica Leigh won the tournament after defeating Jordan Blade in the finals.

Quarterfinals
1	Adena Steele
8	Erica Leigh
4	Abby Jane
5	Mother Endless
2	Bonesaw Brooks
7	Kennedi Copeland
3	Cosmic
6	Jordan Blade

Semifinals
Erica Leigh
Mother Endless
Kennedi Copeland
Jordan Blade

Final
Erica Leigh
Jordan Blade
