= ECWA Women's Championship =

Professional wrestling women's championship

Details
- Promotion: East Coast Wrestling Association
- Date established: September 7, 2013
- Date retired: April 30, 2022
Statistics
- First champion(s): Jessie Kaye
- Final champion(s): Gabby Ortiz
- Most reigns: Renee Michelle and Gabby Ortiz (2 times)
- Longest reign: Deonna Purrazzo (735 days)
- Shortest reign: Gabby Ortiz and Scarlett Bordeaux (<1 days)

The East Coast Wrestling Association Women's Championship (stylized as ECWA Women's Championship) was a women's professional wrestling championship in East Coast Wrestling Association.

== Title history ==
Key
No.	Overall reign number
Reign	Reign number for the specific champion
Days	Number of days held

No.	Champion	Championship change			Reign statistics		Notes	Ref.
No.	Champion	Date	Event	Location	Reign	Days	Notes	Ref.
1	Jessie Kaye	September 7, 2013	ECWA 46th Anniversary Show	Newark, DE	1	273	Defeated Missy Sampson to become the inaugural champion.	
2	Renee Michelle	June 7, 2014	Raising the Bar III	Newark, DE	1	35		
—	Vacated	July 12, 2014	Hall of Fame	Newark, DE	—	—	The championship was vacated due to a match against Jessie Kaye ends with a double pinfall in a Loser Leaves ECWA match.	
3	Tessa Blanchard	October 11, 2014	Super 8 ChickFight Tournament	Carney's Point, NJ	1	161	Defeated Jenny Rose at the Super 8 ChickFight Tournament finals to win the vacant championship.	
4	Renee Michelle	March 21, 2015	19th Annual Super 8 Tournament	Woodbury Heights, NJ	2	147		
—	Vacated	August 15, 2015	—	—	—	—	The championship was vacated for unknown reasons.	
5	Deonna Purrazzo	October 17, 2015	2nd Annual Super 8 ChickFight Tournament	Woodbury Heights, NJ	1	609	Defeated Tessa Blanchard at the Super 8 ChickFight Tournament finals to win the vacant championship.	
—	Vacated	June 17, 2017	Raising the Bar	Woodbury Heights, NJ	—	—	Deonna Purrazzo vacated the championship after defeating Karen Q.	
6	Karen Q	October 21, 2017	4th Annual Super 8 ChickFight Tournament	Woodbury Heights, NJ	1	42	Defeated Deonna Purrazzo and Santana Garrett in a three-way match at the Super 8 ChickFight Tournament finals to win the vacant championship.	
—	Vacated	December 2, 2017	—	—	—	—	Karen Q was stripped from her championship for failing to make title defense.	
7	Damaris	December 2, 2017	Toys for Tots VI	Woodbury Heights, NJ	1	112	Defeated Miss Jasmine to win vacated championship.	
8	Christina Marie	March 24, 2018	Joker's Wild	Atlantic City, NJ	1	203		
9	Miss Jasmine	October 13, 2018	Witching Hour	New Castle, DE	1	154		
10	Scarlett Bordeaux	March 16, 2019	Super 8 ChickFight Tournament 2019	New Castle, DE	1	<1		
11	Gabby Ortiz	March 16, 2019	Super 8 ChickFight Tournament 2019	New Castle, DE	1	<1		
12	Quinn McKay	March 16, 2019	Super 8 ChickFight Tournament 2019	New Castle, DE	1	N/A (Note: It is unknown how many days Quinn McKay held the title due to it being unknown when she vacated the championship sometime in 2019.)		
—	Vacated	2019	—	—	—	—	Quinn McKay vacated the championship in 2019, but the exact date is uncertain.	
13	Gabby Ortiz	August 3, 2021	N/A	Paulsboro, NJ	2	270	Ortiz was awarded the vacant championship.	
—	Deactivated	April 30, 2022	Night of Unusual Matches	Morganville, NJ	—	—	The championship was retired after Erica Leigh captured the ECWA Legacy Championship and it was determined that the gender barriers between championships was no longer needed, making Gabby Ortiz the final champion.	

== Combined Reigns ==
N/A	The exact length of a title reign is too uncertain to calculate.

Rank	Wrestler	No. of Reigns	Combined Days
1	Deonna Purrazzo	1	609
2	Jessie Kaye	1	273
3	Gabby Ortiz	2	270
4	Christina Marie	1	203
5	Renee Michelle	2	182
6	Tessa Blanchard	1	161
7	Miss Jasmine	1	154
8	Damaris	1	112
9	Karen Q	1	42
10	Scarlett Bordeaux	1	<1
11	Quinn McKay	1	N/A
