= Helen Sommers =

American politician (1932–2017)

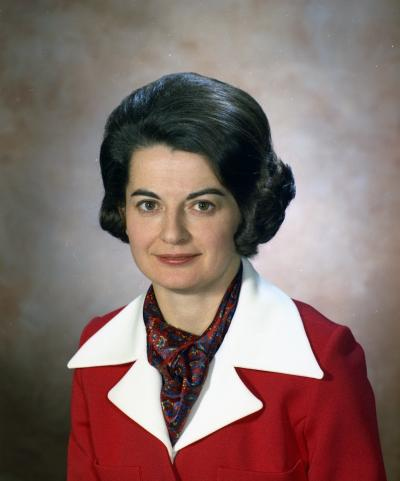
- Sommers in 1973

Member of the Washington House of Representatives from the 36th district
- In office January 8, 1973 – January 12, 2009
- Preceded by: Gladys Kirk
- Succeeded by: Reuven Carlyle

Personal details
- Born: Helen Elizabeth Sommers; March 29, 1932 Woodbury Heights, New Jersey, U.S.
- Died: March 7, 2017 (aged 84) Palm Beach Gardens, Florida, U.S.
- Party: Democratic
- Education: University of Washington

Helen Elizabeth Sommers (March 29, 1932 – March 7, 2017) was an American politician. She served in the Washington House of Representatives from 1972 to 2009. She represented Washington's 36th legislative district as a Democrat. At the time of her retirement she was the state's longest serving legislator.

== Early life ==
Sommers was born on March 29, 1932, in Woodbury Heights, New Jersey. Her parents were Roy Sommers, a car dealer who lost his auto dealership during the Great Depression and worked as a car salesman for the remainder of his career, and Christine Sommers, a housewife who went back to her job as office manager for the local Girl Scouts chapter after her husband lost his dealership. Sommers and her siblings Martin and Joan were raised Presbyterian. She graduated from Woodbury High School, where she joined the National Honor Society and studied secretarial training.

== Early career ==
After graduation, Sommers began working for a Mobil Oil Company refinery as a clerk. In 1962, she began studying correspondence courses at the University of Washington although she had never been to the state. She visited Seattle, Washington, in 1965 for summer classes and moved to the city full-time in 1968 where she earned her bachelor's and masters' degrees in economics from the university. She was also a Charles Bullard Forest Research Fellow at Harvard University.

== Political career ==
Sommers was first elected to the Washington House of Representatives in 1972, the first woman to be elected from her district in thirty years. She was appointed as the chair of the House Appropriations Committee on January 10, 1994, by Speaker Brian Ebersole.

== Death and legacy ==
Sommers died on March 7, 2017, in Palm Beach Gardens, Florida, aged 84. A building on the Capitol Campus was named in her honor.
