= Deonna Purrazzo =

American professional wrestler (born 1994)

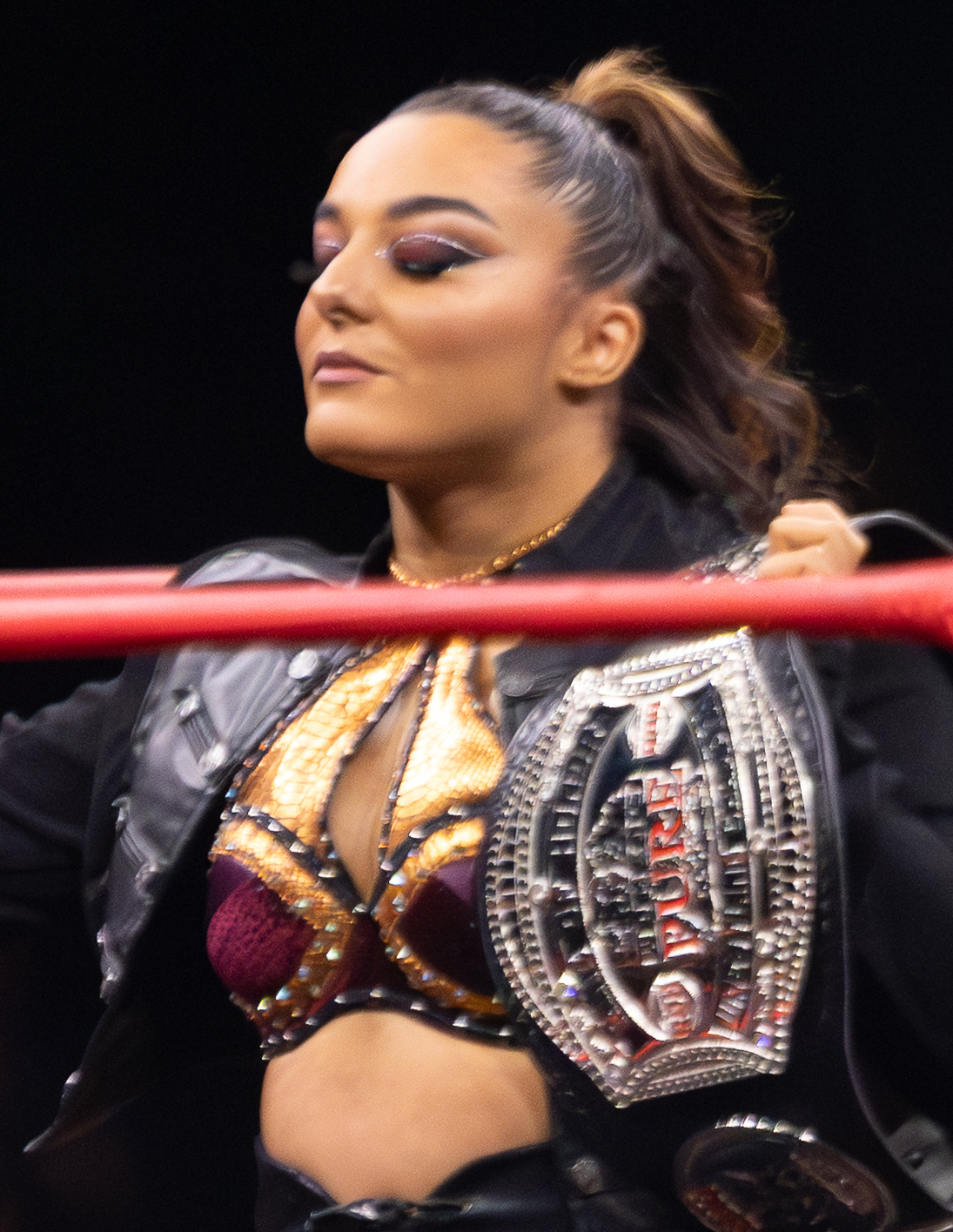
- Purrazzo in 2026

Personal information
- Born: Deonna Lynn Purrazzo; June 10, 1994 (age 32) Livingston, New Jersey, U.S.
- Education: Southern New Hampshire University (BA)
- Spouse: Steve Maclin (m. 2022)

Professional wrestling career
- Ring name(s): Deonna; Deonna Purrazzo; La Luchadora
- Billed height: 5 ft 3 in (1.60 m)
- Billed weight: 154 lb (70 kg)
- Billed from: Hackettstown, New Jersey
- Trained by: Damian Adams; WWE Performance Center; Rip Rogers; Robbie E
- Debut: December 6, 2013

Deonna Lynn Purrazzo (born June 10, 1994) is an American professional wrestler. She is signed to All Elite Wrestling (AEW) and its sister promotion Ring of Honor (ROH), where she is the current and inaugural ROH Women's Pure Champion.

Purrazzo began training in December 2012, and then started wrestling in various independent promotions the following year, eventually appearing in national companies TNA and ROH. She also worked for the Japanese promotion World Wonder Ring Stardom from 2017 to 2018. After making various appearances for WWE beginning in 2014, she signed with the company in 2018 and was appointed to its developmental brand NXT, yet she was released in 2020. Purrazzo then re-signed with TNA, which had been renamed to Impact Wrestling in 2017, and quickly rose through the ranks in the women's division, and she also appeared in AAA through a partnership with Impact. After leaving Impact at the end of 2023, Purrazzo signed with AEW that same month.

== Early life ==
Deonna Lynn Purrazzo was born on June 10, 1994, in Livingston, New Jersey. She is of Italian descent and has a twin brother named Dominic; Deonna was born first. Purazzo grew up in Jefferson Township, New Jersey, and attended Jefferson Township High School.

== Professional wrestling career ==
=== Early career (2012–2016) ===
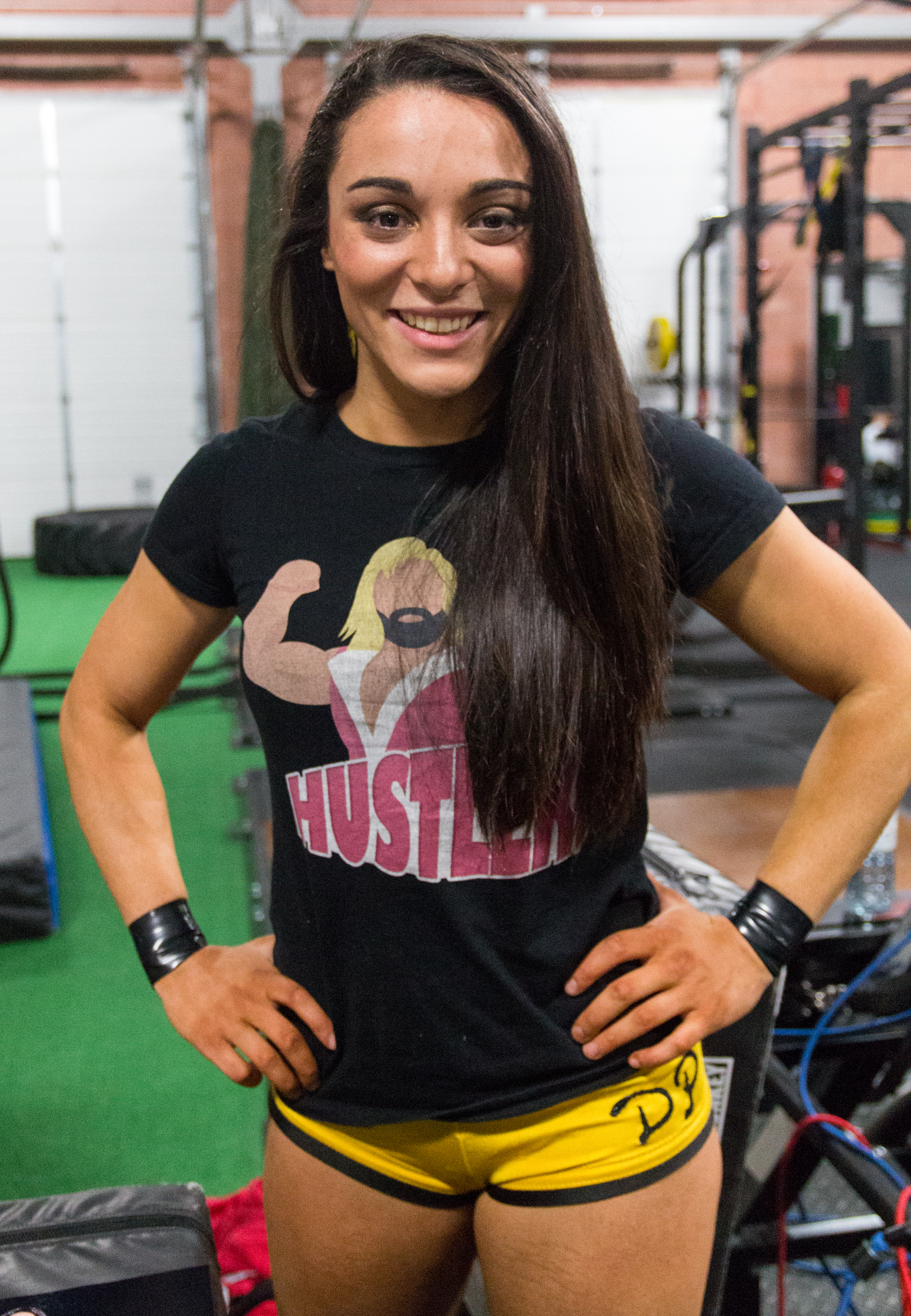
Purrazzo in 2016

Purrazzo started training at the now defunct D2W Pro Wrestling Academy in December 2012 after she spotted an advertisement for it. She made her in-ring debut in 2013. Purrazzo left D2W in 2014, alongside trainer Damian Adams. Both continued training at Team Adams Training facility in Northern New Jersey. She has attended extra training sessions alongside Rip Rogers at Ohio Valley Wrestling (OVW) in Louisville, Kentucky.

On October 17, 2015, at the East Coast Wrestling Association (ECWA)'s second annual Super 8 ChickFight Tournament, Purrazzo won the tournament and the ECWA Women's Championship after defeating Tessa Blanchard in the finals. On October 22, 2016, Purazzo, still being the ECWA Women's Champion, won the third Super 8 ChickFight Tournament after defeating Karen Q in the finals, being the first wrestler in ECWA's history to win the tournament back-to-back. On June 17, 2017, Purrazzo vacated the championship after defeating Karen. On October 21, at the fourth Super 8 ChickFight Tournament, Purrazzo advanced to the finals, where she faced against Karen and Santana Garrett in a three-way match, which was won by Karen.

=== Ring of Honor (2015–2018) ===
Purrazzo is co-credited with starting the "rebirth" of Ring of Honor (ROH)'s women's division (officially called Women of Honor), as her ROH debut match against Mandy Leon (in Baltimore, Maryland on July 25, 2015) was ROH's first women's match in roughly a decade. Although losing the contest, this match set the tone for what was to come in WOH. In December 2015 at the 2300 Arena in Philadelphia, Pennsylvania, Purrazzo teamed with Hania "The Howling Huntress" in another losing effort against Mandy Leon and Sumie Sakai. Purrazzo made an appearance at the Ring of Honor Supercard of Honor X in April 2016 where she teamed with Amber Gallows in a tag team match against Solo Darling and Mandy Leon, but lost via submission. On the December 14 episode of ROH's Women of Honor Wednesday webseries, Purrazzo returned to face off against Sumie Sakai in a winning effort. Purrazzo made her first appearance on ROH TV episode that aired on December 10, 2016. Purrazzo defeated Candice LeRae.

On June 23, 2017, at Best in the World, Purrazzo teamed with Mandy Leon in a losing effort against Kris Wolf and Sumie Sakai. During the following night's TV tapings, Purrazzo wrestled a three-way match against Karen Q and Kelly Klein, and was pinned by Karen Q. On the July 29 tapings (uploaded on YouTube on September 6), Purrazzo lost a singles match to Klein, following interference from Karen Q, who attacked Purrazzo during and after the match. On October 13, at Global Wars: Pittsburgh, Purrazzo teamed with Leon and Jenny Rose in a winning effort, against Britt Baker, Faye Jackson and Sumie Sakai.

On January 11, 2018, Purrazzo signed a contract with ROH.

Purrazzo was a featured participant in the Women of Honor Championship tournament, held in the spring of 2018. At ROH Manhattan Mayhem 2018 she won together with Tenille Dashwood in a tag team match against Jenny Rose and Sumie Sakai. Purrazzo advanced to the quarterfinals of the Women Of Honor Championship tournament by defeating Holidead, then was eliminated by World Wonder Ring Stardom's Mayu Iwatani.

Purrazzo left ROH on July 1, 2018, her final match came in a loss against Kelly Klein.

=== Total Nonstop Action Wrestling (2014–2017) ===
Purrazzo made her TNA wrestling debut during the May 10, 2014, taping of Total Nonstop Action Wrestling, losing a singles match against Brooke at Knockouts Knockdown II. Deonna returned to TNA on January 8, 2016, at the One Night Only: Live PPV and participated in a number one contender's gauntlet match, where she was eliminated by Awesome Kong. She made a third appearance on March 17, 2016, at Knockouts Knockdown IV where she lost to Madison Rayne. On the January 19, 2017 edition of Impact Wrestling, Purrazzo faced Brooke in a losing effort. Purrazzo was also featured in an Xplosion match, losing to Laurel Van Ness.

=== World Wonder Ring Stardom (2017–2018) ===
Purrazzo made her World Wonder Ring Stardom debut, on January 29, 2017. Purrazzo teamed with Christi Jaynes and Shayna Baszler in a six-woman tag team match, with the trio defeating Oedo Tai Kagetsu, Kris Wolf and Viper.

On February 4, Purrazzo teamed once again with Baszler and Jaynes in another winning effort against Arisu Nanase, Jungle Kyona and Natsuko Tora. On February 11, Purrazzo and Baszler defeated Queen's Quest (HZK and Io Shirai) and Toni Storm and Zoe Lucas, in a three-way tag team match. On February 18, Purrazzo teamed with Baszler and Jaynes in a winning effort against AZM, HZK and Shirai in a six-woman tag team match. On February 23, Purrazzo unsuccessfully challenged Storm for the SWA World Championship.

Purrazzo returned to Stardom on June 3, 2018, where she teamed with Lucas and Storm in a losing effort against Io Shirai, Konami and Momo Watanabe. On June 23, Purrazzo unsuccessfully challenged Watanabe for the Wonder of Stardom Championship.

=== WWE (2014–2020) ===
==== Early appearances (2014–2017) ====
In 2014, Purrazzo started working as extra talent for WWE appearing in several skits with Adam Rose as a "Rosebud".

She appeared on the November 11, 2015, episode of NXT where she was defeated by Nia Jax. On the November 19 episode of NXT, Purrazzo lost to Asuka. On the January 13, 2016, episode of NXT, she participated in a battle royal to determine the number one contender for the NXT Women's Championship. She kept appearing throughout 2016, losing to the likes of Asuka, Emma, Nia Jax, and Bayley.

On the December 13, 2016, episode of SmackDown Live, Purrazzo was set to face SmackDown Women's Champion Alexa Bliss, however, Bliss attacked her before the match began.

In 2017, WWE selected Purrazzo as an alternate for its inaugural Mae Young Classic tournament. She wrestled on night two of the tournament in a dark match, teaming with Jessica James to defeat Nicole Matthews and Barbi Hayden.

==== NXT (2018–2020) ====
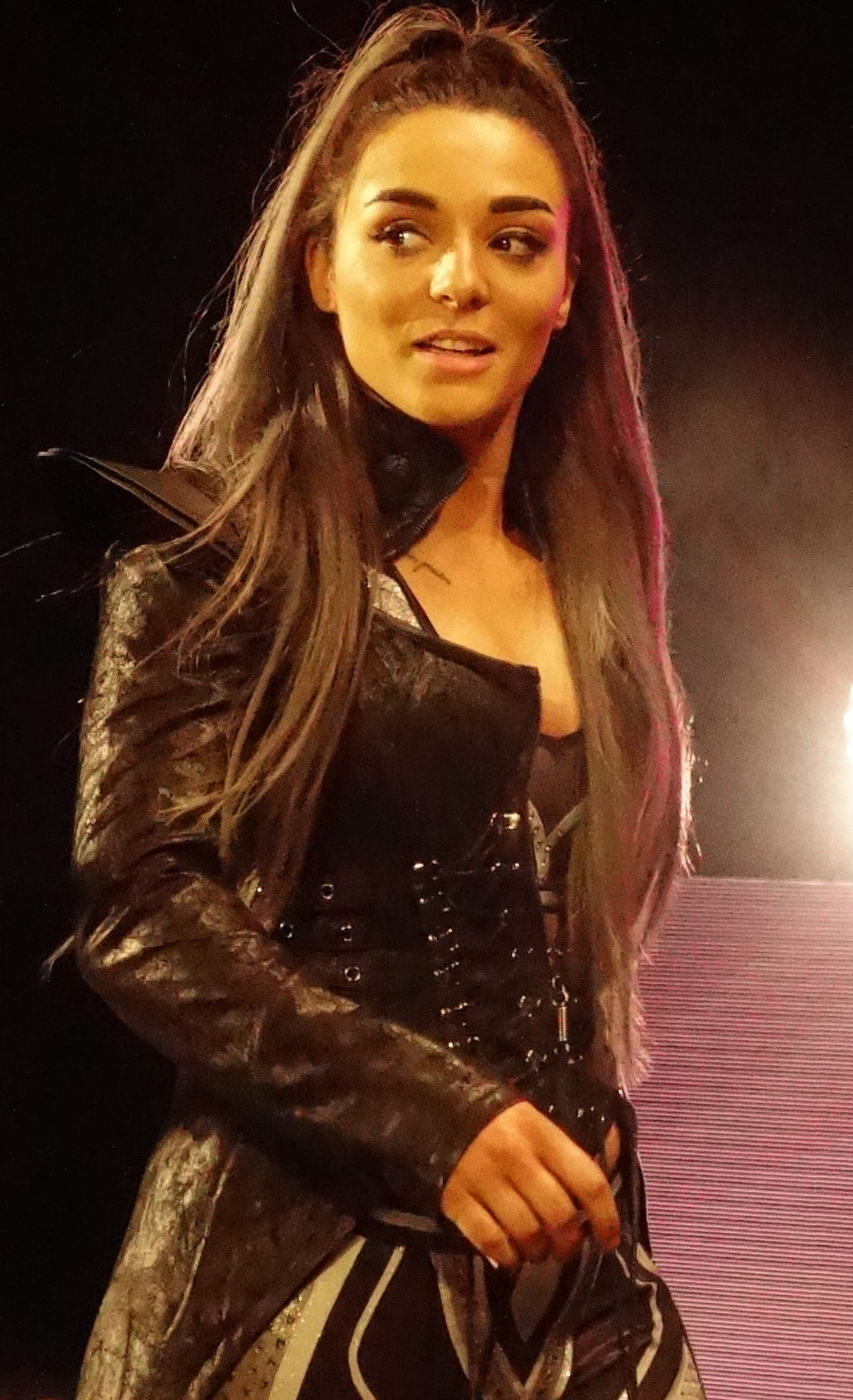
Purrazzo in 2019.

In early April 2018 during the “WrestleMania Weekend”, WWE offered Purrazzo a contract backstage at a Shimmer Women Athletes show. Though Purrazzo was still under contract to Ring of Honor, she accepted and pulled out of her match at that summer's All In pay per view (a record-setting independent wrestling event produced by what would become AEW). Purrazzo's WWE signing was reported on May 31; that same week, WWE announced she would appear in the second Mae Young Classic. On August 22, Purrazzo fought Bianca Belair in a losing effort. During the Mae Young Classic, Purrazzo advanced to the tournament's quarterfinals, defeating Priscilla Kelly and Xia Li before losing to Io Shirai. On December 26, Purrazzo made her NXT UK debut, where she unsuccessfully challenged Rhea Ripley for the NXT UK Women's Championship, after the match, Ripley attacked Purrazzo until she was rescued by Toni Storm. The following week, Purrazzo fought Storm, where, Storm managed to defeat her. On December 16, 2019, Purrazzo appeared on Raw in a singles match against Asuka, where she was defeated. On the January 15, 2020 episode of NXT, Purrazzo attacked Shotzi Blackheart upon being eliminated from a battle royal by her, also turning heel. Purrazzo had an unsuccessful match with Blackheart on January 29. Purrazzo also fought Tegan Nox for the chance to qualify in a number one Contender's Ladder Match, but Nox defeated her. Purrazzo appeared on the April 6 episode of Raw in a squash match against the returning Nia Jax, where she was defeated. On April 15, WWE released Purrazzo and nearly two dozen other wrestlers and producers, ending her six-year tenure the company. During Purrazzo's entire WWE run, she had only 16 televised matches. According to Purrazzo, WWE's creative team believed she was not yet ready for television.

=== Return to Impact Wrestling (2020–2023) ===
==== Knockouts World Champion (2020–2022) ====
After Purrazzo's WWE release, Impact Wrestling wrestler/producer Madison Rayne contacted her. One month after, Purrazzo appeared on the May 26 episode of Impact! in a taped promo introducing herself as "The Virtuosa", a wrestler possessing immense technical skill and certainty of her future success. Purrazzo's in-ring debut was on the June 9 episode of Impact!, attacking Knockouts Champion Jordynne Grace and by placing her in the Fujiwara armbar to establish herself as a heel. On July 18 at Slammiversary, Purrazzo defeated Grace by submission to win the championship. On August 24, during the second night of the Emergence special, Purrazzo made her first successful title defense against Grace in the first Knockouts 30-minute Iron Man match in Impact history, winning two falls to one. At Victory Road, she had another successful title defense against Susie. On October 21, it was confirmed that Purrazzo had signed a long-term deal with Impact Wrestling.

At Bound for Glory, Purrazzo was scheduled to defend the Knockouts Championship against Kylie Rae, however, Rae was injured which Impact had not provided an explanation for her absence during the show. Su Yung was the replacement for Rae and defeated Purrazzo, ending her reign at 98 days. On November 14, at Turning Point, Purrazzo won back the title from Yung in a no disqualification match. After she and Kimber Lee were eliminated in the first round of the Knockouts Tag Team Championship Tournament, Purrazzo feuded with Rosemary and Taya Valkyrie, beating them in successful title defenses at Final Resolution and Hard To Kill respectively. On March 13, 2021, at Sacrifice, she defeated ODB to retain her Knockouts title. On April 10, at Hardcore Justice, Purrazzo defeated Jazz in a Title vs. Career match, ending Jazz's in-ring career. At Rebellion, she retained her title against Tenille Dashwood. On May 15, at Under Siege, Purrazzo defeated Havok by submission to successfully retain her title. On June 12, at Against All Odds, Purrazzo defeated Rosemary again to successfully retain her Knockouts Championship.

At Slammiversary, Purrazzo was scheduled to face a mystery opponent, who was revealed to be Thunder Rosa, however, Purrazzo defeated her and retained her title. After the match, National Wrestling Alliance (NWA) executive producer Mickie James invited Purrazzo to defend the title at NWA EmPowerrr, but Purrazzo give her disrespect and James kicked Purrazzo in the face. At Homecoming, Purrazzo teamed with Matthew Rehwoldt and defeated Hernandez and Alisha Edwards in the first round, Matt Cardona and Chelsea Green in the semifinals, and Decay (Crazzy Steve and Rosemary) in the final to become the Homecoming King and Queen. At Emergence, Purrazzo and Rehwoldt defeated Trey Miguel and Melina. Purrazzo eventually accepted Mickie James' invite, successfully defending the Knockouts Championship against Melina at NWA EmPowerrr. At Knockouts Knockdown, Purrazzo defeated Masha Slamovich, James' handpicked opponent. At Bound for Glory on October 23, Purrazzo lost the title to James, ending her reign at 343 days. At Turning Point, Purrazzo attacked James after she retained the title against Mercedes Martinez, and announced that she would invoke her rematch clause at Hard To Kill. At the event, on January 8, 2022, Purrazzo failed to regain the title, losing to James in a Texas Deathmatch.This was the first time the Knockouts main evented a PPV.

==== Championship reigns (2022–2023) ====
On the January 10, 2022, episode of Impact!, Purrazzo defeated Rok-C in a Winner Takes All match to retain her AAA Reina de Reinas Championship and also win the ROH Women's World Championship. At Slammiversary, she competed in the inaugural Queen of the Mountain match for the Knockouts World Championship, which was won by Jordynne Grace.

On the July 21 episode of Impact!, Purrazzo alongside Chelsea Green, now collectively known as VXT, faced the Knockouts World Champion Jordynne Grace and Mia Yim, which they were victorious. Ten days later, at Ric Flair's Last Match event, she competed in a three-way match for the title, which was won by Grace after she made Rachael Ellering submit. On August 12, at the Countdown to Emergence pre-show, VXT defeated Rosemary and Taya Valkyrie to win the Impact Knockouts World Tag Team Championship. They lost the titles on October 7 at Bound for Glory to The Death Dollz (Jessicka, Rosemary and Valkyrie), ending their reign at 56 days.

On the January 9, 2023 episode of Impact!, Purrazzo confronted Gisele Shaw for mentioning Chelsea Green. Shaw got a bowl of food and was about to throw it at Purrazzo but she saw it coming and threw it all over Shaw's face. Purrazzo thought it was hilarious, turning face in the process, so Santino Marella stepped in and said that they could settle their differences at No Surrender. On February 24, 2023, at the event, Purrazzo was defeated by Shaw. In March 2023, the rematch between Purrazzo and Shaw was set to take place at Sacrifice. On March 24, Purrazzo defeated Shaw in a rematch at Sacrifice. Six days later at Multiverse United, Purrazzo defeated Masha Slamovich, Miyu Yamashita and Shaw, who Purrazzo pinned, in a four-way match to be added to Impact Knockouts World Championship match at Rebellion.

Purrazzo went on to beat Jordynne Grace at Rebellion to win the title for the third time (defending champion Mickie James has vacated the title due to injury, with Purrazzo and Grace competing to become the new champion). On the April 27 episode of Impact!, during the main event, Purrazzo had her first successful title defense after submitting Taylor Wilde. Post-match, Purrazzo was attacked by Wilde and her accomplice KiLynn King before being saved by Grace. On the May 11, 2023, episode of Impact!, Purrazzo and Grace challenged The Coven for their title, but were unsuccessful. Post-match, Purrazzo and Grace was attacked by The Coven until Trinity runs down to the ring and makes the save. On May 26 at Under Siege, Purrazzo successfully retained the title against Grace. Since Grace lost, she can no longer challenge for the title as long as Purrazzo is champion.

On the June 1 episode of Impact!, Trinity challenged Purrazzo for her title at Slammiversary which Purrazzo accepted, however, both were attacked by Gisele Shaw and Savannah Evans afterwards. On June 9, at Against All Odds, Purrazzo teamed with Trinity defeating Evans and Shaw. On July 15 at Slammiversary, Purrazzo lost her title to Trinity via submission, ending her reign at 90 days. Four days later, on the subsequent episode of Impact!, Purrazzo, furious that Grace's return announcement came after she lost the Knockouts World Championship, challenged Grace to a match at Victory Road. At the event, Purrazzo lost to Grace. at Turning Point, Purrazzo lost to Trinity in a Last Chance match failing to win the championship. After the match, she attacked Trinity from behind only to be laid out by special guest referee Gail Kim.

At Final Resolution on December 9, Purrazzo teamed with Gisele Shaw losing to Trinity and Jordynne Grace. After the match, she offered Shaw a handshake which was accepted by Shaw, but was laid out afterwards. This marked Purrazzo's final appearance with the company as her contract was set to expire by the end of the year.

=== Lucha Libre AAA Worldwide (2021–2023) ===
On May 1, 2021 (through Impact's talent sharing agreement with AAA), Purrazzo made her Mexican wrestling and AAA debut challenging Faby Apache at Triplemanía XXIX. Purrazzo won this Champion vs. Champion match, winning the AAA Reina de Reinas title while defending the Impact Knockouts Championship. On April 23, 2022, at Rebellion, she lost the title to Taya Valkyrie, ending her reign at 252 days. On March 19, 2023, Purrazzo alongside Jordynne Grace and Kamille, representing the United States, won the women's Lucha Libre World Cup after defeating Team Mexico (Flammer, La Hiedra and Sexy Star II) in the finals.

=== All Elite Wrestling / Return to ROH (2022; 2024–present) ===
==== One night appearance (2022) ====
On April 1, 2022, Purrazzo was also booked for the Multiverse of Matches at WrestleCon, which was held on the same night as ROH's Supercard of Honor XV; as such, she was unable to attend the latter event. Mercedes Martinez then became interim champion of the ROH Women's World Championship by defeating Willow Nightingale during the event, setting up for a championship unification match with Purrazzo. The match took place on the May 4 episode of Dynamite, where Martinez defeated Purrazzo in the main event.

==== The Vendetta (2024–2025) ====
On the January 3, 2024 episode of Dynamite, Purrazzo made her official company debut by confronting Mariah May and officially announced that she was signed to AEW, establishing herself as a face in the process, targeting former friend Toni Storm's AEW Women's World Championship. On the January 13 episode of Collision, Purrazzo made her official AEW in-ring debut by defeating Red Velvet. On March 3 at Revolution, Purrazzo unsuccessfully challenged "Timeless" Toni Storm for the AEW Women's World Championship. Following her match with Thunder Rosa on the April 27 episode of Rampage, Purrazzo turned heel by attacking her after the match. Purrazzo continued her feud with Rosa, defeating her in a singles bout on May 26 at Double or Nothing and in a no disqualification match on June 15 during the one year anniversary of Collision. Purrazzo participated in the Women's Owen Hart Foundation Tournament, where she was defeated by Hikaru Shida in the first round on the June 29 episode of Collision.

Purrazzo continued her feud with Thunder Rosa, attacking her on the July 12 episode of Rampage after her match with Rachael Ellering. On the following week's Collision, she defeated Rosa for the third time in a lumberjack match following assistance from Taya Valkyrie. On the August 3 episode of Collision, Purrazzo accepted Rosa's challenge for a Texas bullrope match on next week's Collision, which she lost. In late 2024, Purrazzo formed an alliance with Valkyrie, later known as "The Vendetta".

On January 25, 2025, at Collision: Homecoming, Purrazzo competed in a four-way match to determine the number one contender to Mercedes Moné's AEW TBS Championship, which was won by Yuka Sakazaki who pinned Purrazzo following a distraction by Harley Cameron.)

==== Women's Pure Champion (2025–present) ====
On April 24, 2025, it was confirmed that Purrazzo would make her return to ROH, now the sister promotion of AEW, to compete in a tournament to crown the inaugural ROH Women's Pure Champion. During the May 9 episode of ROH on Honor Club, Purrazzo defeated Ashley Vox, winning the first women's Pure Rules match in ROH. On December 5, 2025, at Final Battle, Purrazzo defeated Billie Starkz in the tournament finals via submission to become the inaugural ROH Pure Women's Champion.

== Professional wrestling style and persona ==
Purrazzo countering her opponents' aerial attack into a Fujiwara armbar, a staple of her arsenal.

Purrazzo describes her style as "very meticulous and very methodical", looking for her Fujiwara armbar submission hold, being called "The Fujiwara Armbar Specialist". She is also nicknamed "The Virtuosa", a nickname she chose since she was looking for a moniker that would not only reflect her technical abilities in the ring, but also gave femininity, elegance, and grace to her persona.

== Other media ==
In September 2025, Purrazzo, alongside her husband Steve Maclin, launched their own podcast named Boots to Boots.

== Personal life ==
In 2020, she began dating fellow professional wrestler and New Jersey native Stephen Kupryk, better known as Steve Maclin. On February 12, 2022, Purrazzo announced that she and Kupryk were engaged. They were married on November 10, 2022.

On August 1, 2023, Purrazzo revealed that she received her Bachelor of Arts degree in history after graduating from Southern New Hampshire University.

In 2024, Purazzo announced that she started working on her Master's degree in Political Science at Liberty University.

== Championships and accomplishments ==
- Dynamite Championship Wrestling
  - DCW Women's Championship (1 time)
- East Coast Wrestling Association
  - ECWA Women's Championship (1 time)
  - ECWA Super 8 ChickFight Tournament (2015, 2016)
  - ECWA Year-End Award (4 times)
    - Match of the Year (2016) – vs. Karen Q on October 22
    - Most Popular Wrestler (2016)
    - Most Shocking Moment (2016) – for winning back to back ECWA Women's Super 8 Tournaments
    - Wrestler of the Year (2016)
- ESPN
  - Ranked No. 25 of the 30 best Pro Wrestlers Under 30 in 2023
- Game Changer Wrestling
  - GCW Women's Championship (1 time)
- Impact Wrestling
  - Impact Knockouts Championship (3 times)
  - Impact Knockouts World Tag Team Championship (1 time) – with Chelsea Green
  - Homecoming King and Queen Tournament (2021) – with Matthew Rehwoldt
  - Impact Year End Award (4 times)
    - Knockout of the Year (2020, 2021)
    - Wrestler of the Year (2020)
    - Knockouts Match of the Year (2021) vs. Mickie James at Bound for Glory
- Lucha Libre AAA Worldwide
  - AAA Reina de Reinas Championship (1 time)
  - Lucha Libre World Cup: 2023 Women's division – with Jordynne Grace and Kamille
- Monster Factory Pro Wrestling
  - MFPW Girls Championship (1 time)
- New York Wrestling Connection
  - NYWC Starlet Championship (1 time)
- Paradise Alley Pro Wrestling
  - Center Ring Divas Championship (1 time)
- Pro Wrestling Illustrated
  - Ranked No. 3 of the top 150 female wrestlers in the PWI Women's 150 in 2021
  - Ranked No. 7 of the top 250 women's wrestlers in the PWI Women's 250 in 2023
- Ring of Honor
  - ROH Women's World Championship (1 time)
  - ROH Women's Pure Championship (1 time, inaugural, current)
  - ROH Women's Pure Championship Tournament (2025)
  - ROH Year-End Award (1 time)
    - WOH Wrestler of the Year (2017)
