= Gladys Kirk =

American politician (1903–1974)

Member of the Washington House of Representatives from the 36th district
- In office 1957–1973
- Preceded by: Douglas Kirk
- Succeeded by: Helen Sommers

Personal details
- Born: February 18, 1903 Gypsum, Colorado
- Died: June 1974 (aged 71) Seattle, Washington
- Party: Republican
- Spouse: Douglas Kirk

Gladys Kirk (February 18, 1903 – June 1974) was an American politician. She was a Republican, representing District 36 in the Washington House of Representatives which included parts of King County, from 1957 to 1973. She was defeated by Helen Sommers in 1972.
