= Wendy Choo =

American professional wrestler (born 1992)

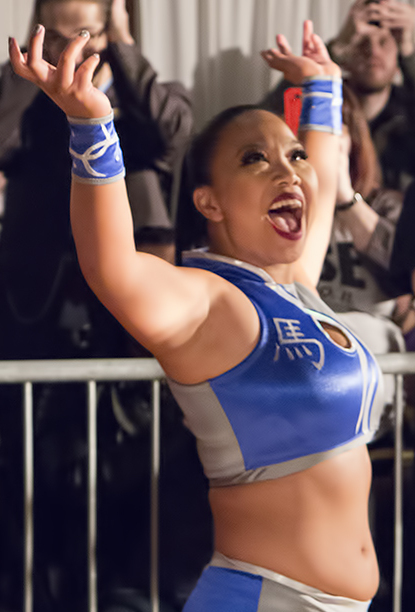
- Choo in 2018

Personal information
- Born: Karen Yu; January 18, 1992 (age 34) New York City, New York, U.S.
- Education: Queens College (BSc); Lehman College (MA)

Professional wrestling career
- Ring name(s): Karen Q Karen Yu; Mei Ying; Wendy Choo
- Billed height: 5 ft 2 in (157 cm)
- Billed from: Chinatown, N.Y. (as Karen Q) "The City That Never Sleeps" (as Wendy Choo)
- Trained by: Damian Adams; Johnny Rodz; Sara Del Rey; WWE Performance Center
- Debut: September 6, 2014

Karen Yu (born January 18, 1992) is an American professional wrestler. She is best known for her time in WWE, where she performed on the NXT and Evolve brands under the ring name Wendy Choo.

Yu started her career in 2014, working on the independent circuit as Karen Q, most notably appearing for Ring of Honor. In 2018 she began to work with WWE during the Mae Young Classic, signing a contract with the promotion the next year. She spent her WWE tenure wrestling the NXT and Evolve brand (as Mei Ying and later as Wendy Choo) and winning the WWE Evolve Women's Championship before leaving WWE in 2026.

== Early life ==
Yu was born on January 18, 1992 in New York City, New York. She grew up in the Bayside, Queens neighborhood of New York City, attending Benjamin N. Cardozo High School. Yu participated in gymnastics from the age of five. Yu received an NCAA Division II scholarship for volleyball, earning a bachelor's degree in physical education from Queens College and a master's degree in teaching from Lehman College. While attending Queens College, she played volleyball for the Queens Knights. Before becoming a full-time professional wrestler, Yu taught physical education at Fiorello H. LaGuardia High School and coached gymnastics at Benjamin N. Cardozo High School.

== Professional wrestling career ==
=== Independent circuit; Ring of Honor (2014–2019) ===
Yu was first trained to wrestle by Johnny Rodz at Gleason's Gym in Brooklyn, then by Damian Adams at the Team Adams Pro Wrestling Academy in Wharton, New Jersey. She debuted in 2014 under her birth name, appearing with the Centereach, New York-based Victory Pro Wrestling (VPW) promotion. Over the following years, she competed on the independent circuit, primarily in the Northeastern United States. In 2016, she adopted the ring name "Karen Q". She won her first title in April 2016, defeating Nikki Addams for the VPW Women's Championship. In 2017, she won the East Coast Wrestling Association Women's Championship. She took part in the ECWA Super 8 ChickFight Tournament in 2016 and 2017, losing to Deonna Purrazzo in the finals in 2016 and winning the tournament in 2017.

In April 2017, Yu began appearing with Ring of Honor (ROH). At Survival of the Fittest in November 2017, she lost to Deonna Purrazzo in a no disqualification match. At Final Battle in December 2018, Yu took part in a four way match for the Women of Honor World Championship that was won by Kelly Klein, marking her first pay-per-view appearance.

=== WWE (2018–2026) ===
==== NXT (2018, 2019–2025) ====
Having made her first appearance with WWE in August 2018, competing in the Mae Young Classic tournament under the ring name Karen Q, Yu signed a contract with WWE in February 2019. She was assigned to the WWE Performance Center in Orlando, Florida for further training. From February to July 2019, she wrestled for WWE as Karen Q, primarily teaming with Xia Li on NXT house shows. In July 2019, Yu suffered a fractured lateral malleolus; she spent the next two years rehabilitating, undergoing two surgeries.

In December 2020, Yu was reintroduced on NXT as "Mei Ying", the leader of the stable Tian Sha alongside Xia Li and Boa. She returned to the ring in August 2021. In November 2021, the Mei Ying character was dropped and Yu was again repackaged, this time as "Wendy Choo". In March 2022, Choo and Dakota Kai competed in the Dusty Rhodes Tag Team Classic, losing to Io Shirai and Kay Lee Ray in the finals. In June 2022 at NXT In Your House, Choo unsuccessfully challenged Mandy Rose for the NXT Women's Championship. Choo went on to feud with Tiffany Stratton, defeating her in a lights out match in August 2022. In February 2023, Choo suffered an unspecified injury; she was written off television to allow her to recuperate via an angle that saw her attacked in a parking lot.

Choo returned to the ring at a house show in May 2024. The next month, she returned to WWE TV under a new, more aggressive persona. In July, Choo formed an alliance with Tatum Paxley, which ended the next month when Choo turned on Paxley at NXT: The Great American Bash after Paxley failed to defeat NXT Women's North American Champion Kelani Jordan for the title. In September, Choo formed an alliance with Total Nonstop Action Wrestling (TNA) wrestler Rosemary, attacking TNA Knockouts World Champion Jordynne Grace during her open challenge. This led to Choo getting a title match at the TNA pay-per-view Victory Road but she failed to win. At the TNA PPV Bound For Glory, Choo and Rosemary failed to defeat TNA Knockouts World Tag Team Champions Spitfire (Dani Luna and Jody Threat) for the titles. After the match, Rosemary turned on Choo, ending their alliance. Their feud culminated in a casket match on the October 29, 2024, episode of NXT, which Choo lost.

==== Evolve (2025–2026) ====
On the March 12, 2025, episode of WWE Evolve, Choo defeated Aria Bennett in her Evolve debut match. Prior to the match, Choo handed Kylie Rae a teddy bear and a note, starting a storyline between the two. In the weeks after, Choo kept giving Rae gifts consisting of teddy bears and blankets. On the April 2 episode, Choo defeated Rae. On the May 28 episode, Choo and Rae were two of the four women who participated in the fatal four-way elimination match to crown the inaugural WWE Evolve Women's Champion, where Choo was eliminated by Rae. After Kendal Grey relinquished the Evolve Women's Championship, Choo (no longer portraying her nightmarish slumber gimmick) won the vacant title by pinning Nikkita Lyons in an eight-woman gauntlet match on the April 15, 2026 episode (taped March 20), marking her first WWE championship. Choo later lost the championship to Lyons at Evolve: Succession III on June 24 (taped May 29), ending her reign at 70 days. On September 4, 2026, Choo was released by WWE.

== Professional wrestling style and persona ==
Choo wrestles in a "technical" style with a mix of "technical wizardry and breathtaking aerial assaults". Her finishing moves have included a modified Boston crab (dubbed the Spring Roll), a fujiwara armbar, and a rear naked choke. She utilizes "an array of stunning suplexes".

In 2020 and 2021, Yu portrayed the "enigmatic and destructive" character of Mei Ying, a 1,000-year-old woman who acted as a "Yoda" for the Tian Sha stable. In 2022, she adopted the gimmick of Wendy Choo, a constantly tired wrestler who performs in a onesie. In 2024, she adopted a more "nightmarish" version of this gimmick.

== Other media ==
Yu made her video game debut as a playable character in the Race to NXT Pack DLC for WWE 2K23 and subsequently appeared in WWE 2K24 and WWE 2K25.

== Personal life ==
Yu is a Chinese American.

== Championships and accomplishments ==
- East Coast Wrestling Association
  - ECWA Women's Championship (1 time)
  - Super 8 ChickFight Tournament (2017)
  - ECWA Year-End Award (1 time)
    - Match of the Year (2016) – vs. Deonna Purrazzo on October 22
- Pro Wrestling Illustrated
  - Ranked No. 86 of the top 100 female wrestlers in the PWI Women's 100 in 2018
- Victory Pro Wrestling
  - VPW Women's Championship (1 time)
- WWE
  - WWE Evolve Women's Championship (1 time)
