= Jessika Carr =

American professional wrestling referee

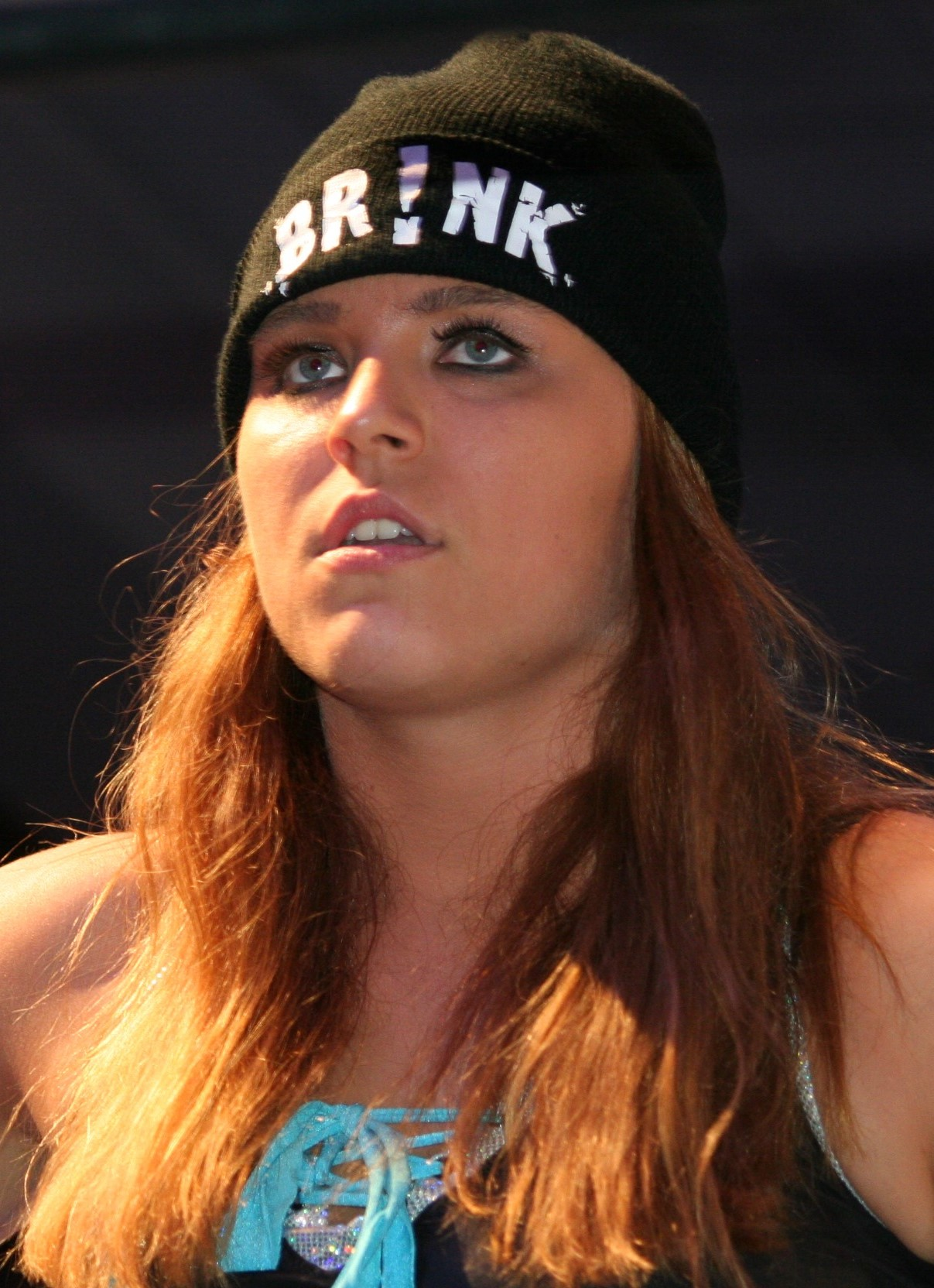
- Carr in 2017

Personal information
- Born: Jessika Heiser; June 25, 1991 (age 34) Baltimore, Maryland, United States

Professional wrestling career
- Ring name(s): Jessie Kaye; Jessika Carr; Jessika Heiser; Kennadi Brink; Kennedy Lewis; Kalyx
- Billed from: Severn, Maryland; Baltimore, Maryland; Hollywood, Florida
- Trained by: Duane Gill; Bubba Ray Dudley; D-Von Dudley; WWE Performance Center
- Debut: July 2011

Jessika Heiser (born June 25, 1991) is an American professional wrestling referee and professional wrestler. She is signed to WWE, where she performs on the Raw brand as a referee under the ring name Jessika Carr, as well as wrestling on the Evolve brand as Kalyx. After signing with the company in 2017, Heiser became the first female WWE referee since the 1980s. She is also known by her ring names Jessie Kaye and Kennadi Brink on the independent circuit. She regularly worked for Maryland Championship Wrestling.

== Early life ==
As a teenager, Heiser was overweight; she credited her love of wrestling and desire to become a wrestler as "her escape" and her inspiration to change. With help from a local professional wrestler, who was signed to a developmental contract with WWE, she was able to lose over 60 lbs and become an athlete.

== Professional wrestling career ==
=== Early career (2011–2017) ===
In July 2010, Heiser started training regularly at Duane Gill's Academy of Professional Wrestling in Severn, Maryland. She made her in ring debut as Jessie Kaye on July 17, 2011, and wrestled under the brands MCW and PCW in 2011. On April 28, 2012, she won the DCW Women's Champion. On June 2, 2013, she became the inaugural VOW Vixen's Champion. On September 7, 2013, she became the inaugural ECWA Women's Champion. Heiser continued to wrestle under the name Jessie Kaye until October 2015 with her final match against Mary Elizabeth Monroe at Mid-Atlantic Wrestling Fanfest.

Heiser debuted as Kennadi Brink in a Four Corners match for the MCW Women's Title on October 16th 2015. On the October 21, 2016 episode of Women of Honor, Heiser made her Ring of Honor debut under the ring name Kennadi Brink in a match against Rachael Ellering. On January 5th 2017 Heiser made her wrestling debut for NXT under the name Kennedy Lewis against Nikki Cross, this is the only appearance of the Kennedy Lewis character. She continued to wrestle under the name Kennadi Brink until April 2017 with her final match being against Renee Michelle and Sahara Se7en at MCW Spring Fever.

=== WWE (2017–present) ===
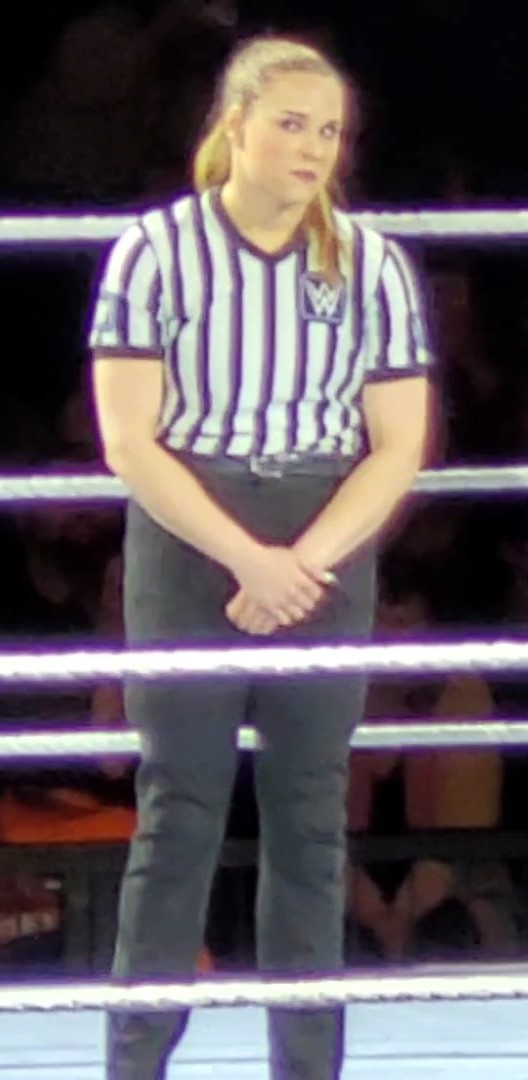
Carr in October 2023

Heiser signed with WWE in 2017 as a referee under the ring name Jessika Carr. She became WWE's first female referee since Rita Chatterton in the 1980s. On November 27. 2019, Heiser refereed her final match in NXT as she was promoted to SmackDown. She was farewelled by Tommaso Ciampa after his loss to Finn Bálor. On October 21, 2021, Heiser refereed at Crown Jewel, becoming the first woman to referee in Saudi Arabia, as well as becoming the first female to referee a Hell in a Cell match. On May 4, 2024, she became the first female referee in WWE to officiate a world title main event at Backlash. On January 6, 2025, she became the first referee to officiate a main event on Netflix. On February 21, 2025, Heiser debuted on Evolve as a wrestler under the ring name Kalyx.

== Personal life ==
Heiser credits The Rock, The Undertaker, Trish Stratus, and Mickie James as her influences in professional wrestling.

== Championships and accomplishments ==
- Dynamite Championship Wrestling
  - DCW Women's Championship (1 time)
- East Coast Wrestling Association
  - ECWA Women's Championship (1 time)
- Pro Wrestling Illustrated
  - Ranked No. 47 of the top 50 female wrestlers in the PWI Female 50 in 2014
- Vicious Outcast Wrestling
  - VOW Vixens Championship (1 time)
