= Woodbury Heights, New Jersey =

Borough in Gloucester County, New Jersey, US

- Borough
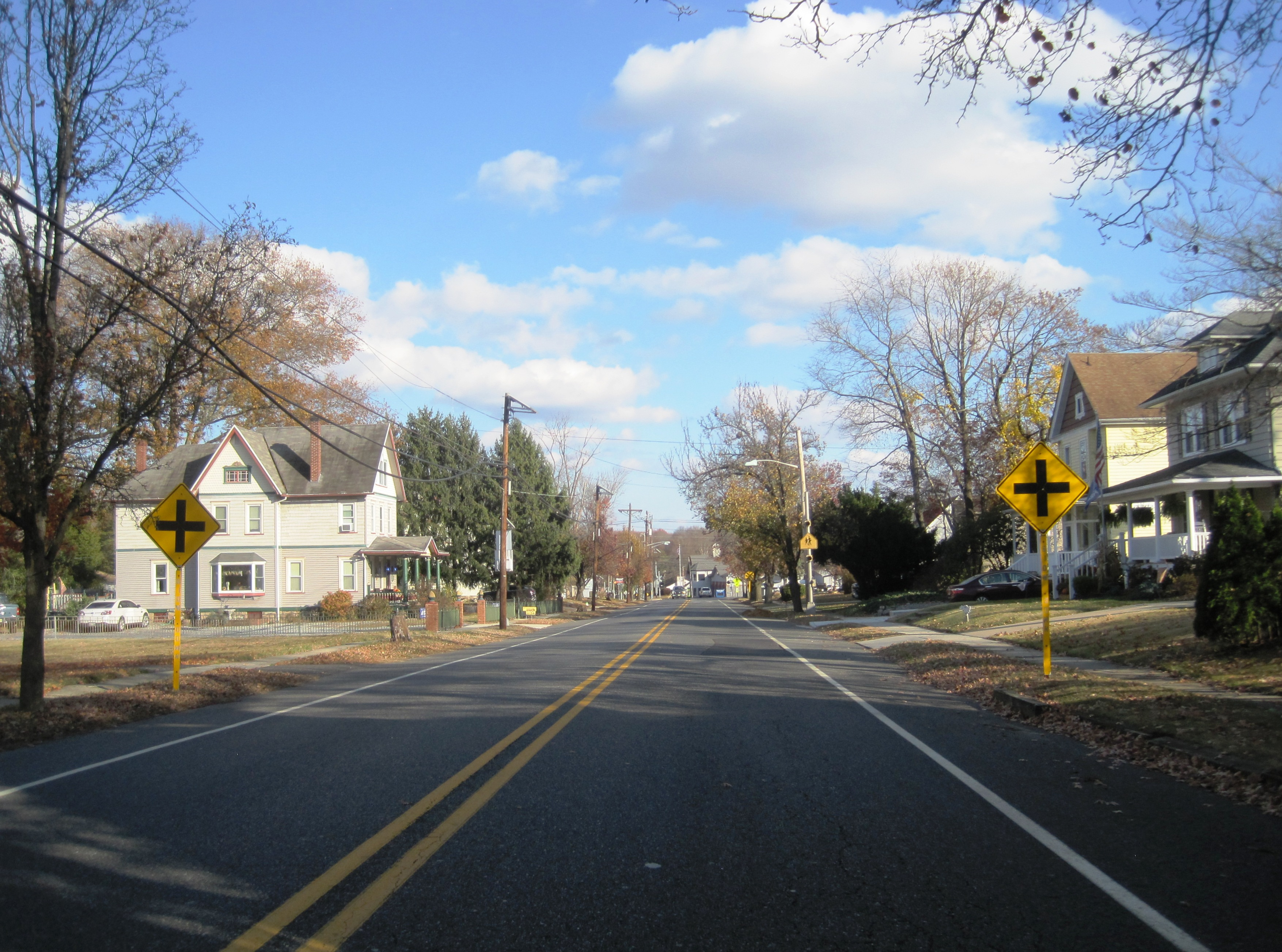
- CR 652 (Elm Avenue) eastbound in Woodbury Heights

- logo

- Map of Woodbury Heights highlighted within Gloucester County. Inset: Location of Gloucester County in New Jersey.

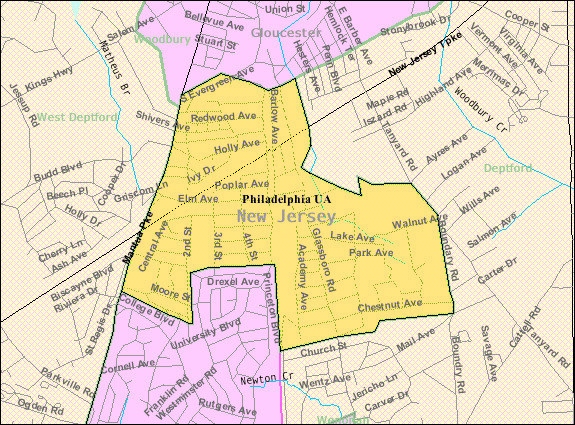
- Census Bureau map of Woodbury Heights, New Jersey

- Location in Gloucester County Location in New Jersey Location in the United States
- Coordinates: 39.81329°N 75.15065°W
- Country: United States
- State: New Jersey
- County: Gloucester
- Incorporated: April 27, 1915

Government
  - Type: Borough
  - Body: Borough Council
  - Mayor: Matthew Cosenza (R, term ends December 31, 2026)
  - Municipal clerk: Shannon Elton

Area
  - Total: 1.25 sq mi (3.24 km^{2})
  - Land: 1.25 sq mi (3.23 km^{2})
  - Water: 0.0077 sq mi (0.02 km^{2}) 0.48%
  - Rank: 480th of 565 in state 22nd of 24 in county
- Elevation: 46 ft (14 m)

Population (2020)
  - Total: 3,098
  - Estimate (2023): 3,127
  - Rank: 446th of 565 in state 20th of 24 in county
  - Density: 2,486/sq mi (960/km^{2})
  - Rank: 253rd of 565 in state 7th of 24 in county
- Time zone: UTC−05:00 (Eastern (EST))
  - Summer (DST): UTC−04:00 (Eastern (EDT))
- ZIP Code: 08097
- Area code: 856
- FIPS code: 3401582180
- GNIS feature ID: 0885448
- Website: bwhnj.com

Woodbury Heights is a borough in Gloucester County, in the U.S. state of New Jersey. As of the 2020 United States census, the borough's population was 3,098, an increase of 43 (+1.4%) from the 2010 census count of 3,055, which in turn reflected an increase of 67 (+2.2%) from the 2,988 counted in the 2000 census.

Woodbury Heights was formed as a borough by an act of the New Jersey Legislature on April 6, 1915, from portions of Deptford Township, based on the results of a referendum held on April 27, 1915. Portions were exchanged with Woodbury in 1925, and portions of the city were annexed on March 22, 1938. Portions were exchanged with Deptford Township in 1956 and other portions were annexed from the township in 1965. The borough was named for the city of Woodbury, which in turn was named for its founder Henry Wood, who settled in the area in 1683 after arriving from Bury, England, at the age of 80 to escape religious persecution.

As of 2020, the borough had the 19th-highest property tax rate in New Jersey with an equalized rate of 4.442% compared to 3.212% in the county as a whole and a statewide average of 2.279%.

== Geography ==
According to the U.S. Census Bureau, the borough had a total area of 1.25 square miles (3.24 km^{2}), including 1.25 square miles (3.23 km^{2}) of land and 0.01 square miles (0.02 km^{2}) of water (0.48%). Glen Lake, although no longer open for swimming, is available for fishing and non-motorized boating.

The borough borders the Gloucester County municipalities of Deptford Township, West Deptford Township, and Woodbury.

== Demographics ==
Historical population
Census	Pop.	Note	%±
1920	481		—
1930	997		107.3%
1940	1,137		14.0%
1950	1,373		20.8%
1960	1,723		25.5%
1970	3,621		110.2%
1980	3,460		−4.4%
1990	3,392		−2.0%
2000	2,988		−11.9%
2010	3,055		2.2%
2020	3,098		1.4%
2023 (est.)	3,127	▲	0.9%
Population sources: 1920–2000 1920; 1920–1930 1940–2000; 2000 2010 2020

=== 2020 census ===
As of the 2020 census, Woodbury Heights had a population of 3,098. The median age was 40.5 years. 21.9% of residents were under the age of 18 and 16.1% of residents were 65 years of age or older. For every 100 females there were 93.0 males, and for every 100 females age 18 and over there were 94.5 males age 18 and over.

100.0% of residents lived in urban areas, while 0.0% lived in rural areas.

There were 1,095 households in Woodbury Heights, of which 33.0% had children under the age of 18 living in them. Of all households, 60.4% were married-couple households, 12.0% were households with a male householder and no spouse or partner present, and 20.9% were households with a female householder and no spouse or partner present. About 17.4% of all households were made up of individuals and 8.4% had someone living alone who was 65 years of age or older.

There were 1,149 housing units, of which 4.7% were vacant. The homeowner vacancy rate was 2.2% and the rental vacancy rate was 3.8%.

Racial composition as of the 2020 census
Race	Number	Percent
White	2,736	88.3%
Black or African American	122	3.9%
American Indian and Alaska Native	2	0.1%
Asian	31	1.0%
Native Hawaiian and Other Pacific Islander	11	0.4%
Some other race	42	1.4%
Two or more races	154	5.0%
Hispanic or Latino (of any race)	164	5.3%

=== 2010 census ===
The 2010 United States census counted 3,055 people, 1,081 households, and 832 families in the borough. The population density was 2,499.4 inhabitants per square mile (965.0/km^{2}). There were 1,125 housing units at an average density of 920.4 per square mile (355.4/km^{2}). The racial makeup was 92.96% (2,840) White, 3.40% (104) Black or African American, 0.16% (5) Native American, 1.64% (50) Asian, 0.03% (1) Pacific Islander, 0.36% (11) from other races, and 1.44% (44) from two or more races. Hispanic or Latino of any race were 2.42% (74) of the population.

Of the 1,081 households, 32.1% had children under the age of 18; 61.2% were married couples living together; 11.1% had a female householder with no husband present and 23.0% were non-families. Of all households, 18.2% were made up of individuals and 9.3% had someone living alone who was 65 years of age or older. The average household size was 2.82 and the average family size was 3.22.

22.6% of the population were under the age of 18, 9.0% from 18 to 24, 24.8% from 25 to 44, 30.0% from 45 to 64, and 13.6% who were 65 years of age or older. The median age was 41.2 years. For every 100 females, the population had 94.2 males. For every 100 females ages 18 and older there were 92.4 males.

The Census Bureau's 2006–2010 American Community Survey showed that (in 2010 inflation-adjusted dollars) median household income was $82,411 (with a margin of error of +/− $6,735) and the median family income was $91,667 (+/− $14,100). Males had a median income of $68,478 (+/− $6,757) versus $49,327 (+/− $4,589) for females. The per capita income for the borough was $33,099 (+/− $2,495). About 0.7% of families and 1.0% of the population were below the poverty line, including 1.0% of those under age 18 and none of those age 65 or over.

=== 2000 census ===
As of the 2000 census, there were 2,988 people, 1,027 households, and 825 families residing in the borough. The population density was 2,437.2 inhabitants per square mile (941.0/km^{2}). There were 1,045 housing units at an average density of 852.4 per square mile (329.1/km^{2}). The racial makeup of the borough was 96.35% White, 1.54% African American or Black, 0.27% Native American, 1.00% Asian, 0.00% Pacific Islander, 0.47% from other races, and 0.37% from two or more races. 1.24% of the population were Hispanic or Latino of any race.

There were 1,027 households, out of which 38.2% had children under the age of 18 living with them, 66.4% were married couples living together, 9.6% had a female householder with no husband present, and 19.6% were non-families. 16.7% of all households were made up of individuals, and 8.1% had someone living alone who was 65 years of age or older. The average household size was 2.89 and the average family size was 3.24.

In the borough, the population was spread out, with 26.1% under the age of 18, 6.7% from 18 to 24, 29.2% from 25 to 44, 24.7% from 45 to 64, and 13.3% who were 65 years of age or older. The median age was 38 years. For every 100 females, there were 92.6 males. For every 100 females age 18 and over, there were 90.8 males.

The median income for a household in the borough was $63,266, and the median income for a family was $70,167. Males had a median income of $51,342 versus $33,220 for females. The per capita income for the borough was $24,001. 4.1% of the population and 2.4% of families were below the poverty line. Out of the total people living in poverty, 3.7% were under the age of 18 and 2.8% were 65 or older.

== Government ==
=== Local government ===
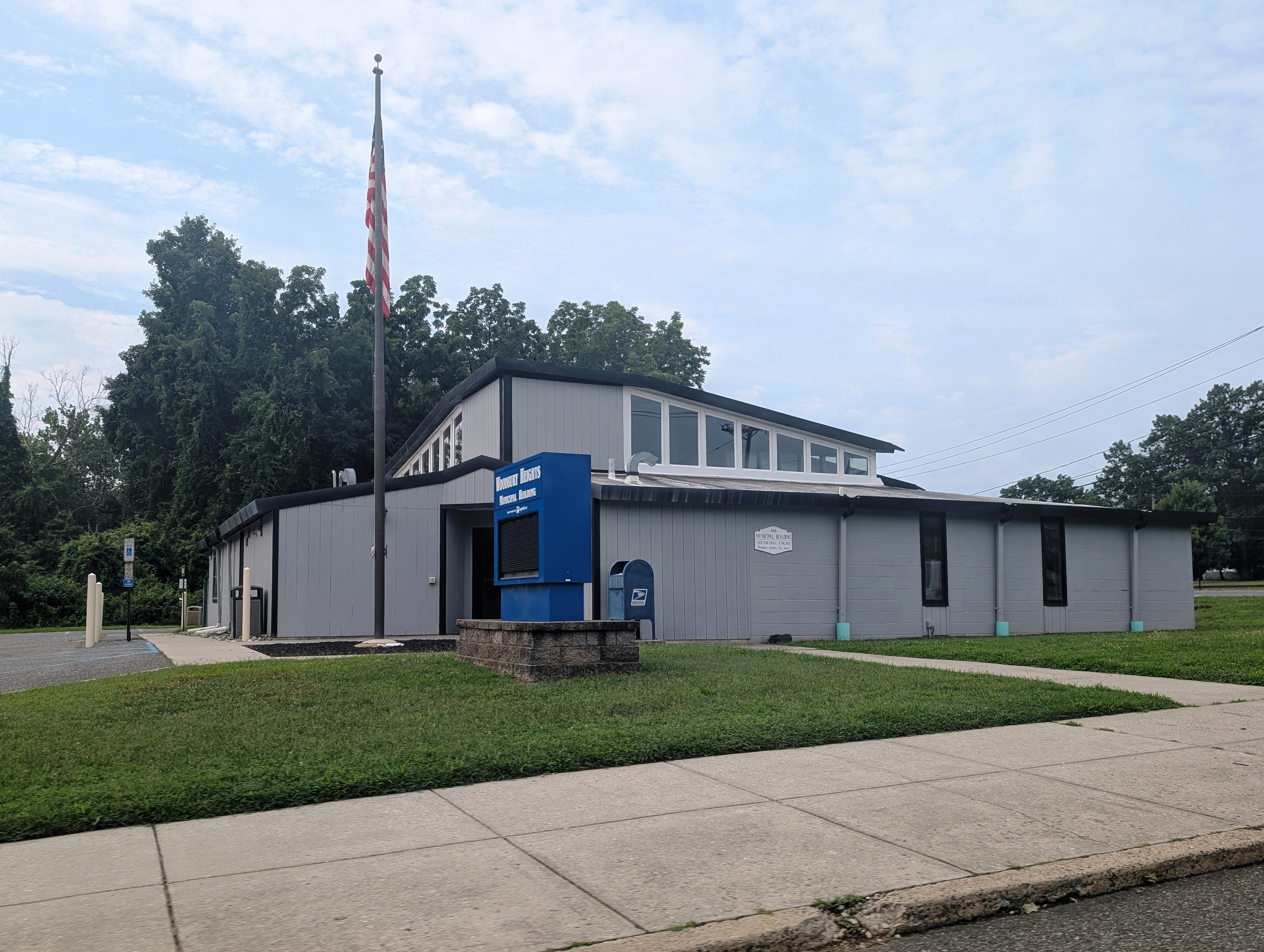
Woodbury Heights municipal complex

Woodbury Heights is governed under the borough form of New Jersey municipal government, which is used in 218 (of the 564) municipalities statewide, making it the most common form of government in New Jersey. The governing body is comprised of the mayor and the borough council, with all positions elected at-large on a partisan basis as part of the November general election. A mayor is elected directly by the voters to a four-year term of office. The borough council includes six members elected to serve three-year terms on a staggered basis, with two seats coming up for election each year in a three-year cycle. The borough form of government used by Woodbury Heights is a "weak mayor / strong council" government in which council members act as the legislative body with the mayor presiding at meetings and voting only in the event of a tie. The mayor can veto ordinances subject to an override by a two-thirds majority vote of the council. The mayor makes committee and liaison assignments for council members, and most appointments are made by the mayor with the advice and consent of the council.

As of 2025, the mayor of Woodbury Heights is Republican Matthew W. Cosenza, whose term of office ends December 31, 2026. Borough Council members are Council President Collin Aregood (D, 2026), Eileen M. Connors (R, 2027), Richard J. Gambale Jr. (D, 2026), Robert M. Yerka (R, 2027), Bruce Farrell (D, 2028) and Nicholas Smith (D, 2028).

At the January 2019 reorganization meeting, the borough council appointed Robert J. Morrison to fill the seat expiring in December 2019 that became vacant when William C. Packer took office as mayor and appointed Jeffrey A. Pitzo to fill the seat expiring in December 2020 that had been held by Eshia "Jake" Jacob.

=== Federal, state, and county representation ===
Woodbury Heights is located in the 1st Congressional District and is part of New Jersey's 5th state legislative district. For the 119th United States Congress, New Jersey's 1st congressional district is represented by Donald Norcross (D, Camden). New Jersey is represented in the United States Senate by Democrats Cory Booker (Newark, term ends 2027) and Andy Kim (Moorestown, term ends 2031).

For the 2026–2027 session, the 5th legislative district of the New Jersey Legislature is represented in the State Senate by Nilsa Cruz-Perez (D, Barrington) and in the General Assembly by Bill Moen (D, Camden) and William Spearman (D, Camden).

Gloucester County is governed by a board of county commissioners, whose seven members are elected at-large to three-year terms of office on a staggered basis in partisan elections, with either two or three seats coming up for election each year. At a reorganization meeting held each January, the Board selects a Director and a Deputy Director from among its members. As of 2025, Gloucester County's Commissioners are:

Director Frank J. DiMarco (D, Deptford Township, 2025), Matt Weng (D, Pitman, 2026), Joann Gattinelli (D, Washington Township, 2026), Nicholas DeSilvio (R, Franklin Township, 2027), Denice DiCarlo (D, West Deptford Township, 2025) Deputy Director Jim Jefferson (D, Woodbury, 2026) and Christopher Konawel Jr. (R, Glassboro, 2027).

Gloucester County's constitutional officers are: Clerk James N. Hogan (D, Franklin Township; 2027), Sheriff Carmel Morina (D, Greenwich Township; 2027) and Surrogate Giuseppe "Joe" Chila (D, Woolwich Township; 2028).

=== Politics ===
United States presidential election results for Woodbury Heights 2024 2020 2016 2012 2008 2004
Year	Republican		Democratic		Third party(ies)	
Year	No.	%	No.	%	No.	%
2024	862	46.92%	939	51.12%	36	1.96%
2020	897	45.81%	1,027	52.45%	34	1.74%
2016	802	47.48%	825	48.85%	62	3.67%
2012	702	42.21%	946	56.89%	15	0.90%
2008	768	42.88%	990	55.28%	33	1.84%
2004	830	47.35%	906	51.68%	17	0.97%

As of March 2011, there were a total of 2,255 registered voters in Woodbury Heights, of which 843 (37.4%) were registered as Democrats, 397 (17.6%) were registered as Republicans and 1,011 (44.8%) were registered as Unaffiliated. There were 4 voters registered as Libertarians or Greens.

In the 2012 presidential election, Democrat Barack Obama received 56.9% of the vote (946 cast), ahead of Republican Mitt Romney with 42.2% (702 votes), and other candidates with 0.9% (15 votes), among the 1,673 ballots cast by the borough's 2,275 registered voters (10 ballots were spoiled), for a turnout of 73.5%. In the 2008 presidential election, Democrat Barack Obama received 54.7% of the vote (990 cast), ahead of Republican John McCain with 42.4% (768 votes) and other candidates with 1.8% (33 votes), among the 1,811 ballots cast by the borough's 2,304 registered voters, for a turnout of 78.6%. In the 2004 presidential election, Democrat John Kerry received 51.5% of the vote (906 ballots cast), outpolling Republican George W. Bush with 47.2% (830 votes) and other candidates with 0.8% (17 votes), among the 1,760 ballots cast by the borough's 2,239 registered voters, for a turnout percentage of 78.6.

Gubernatorial election results for Woodbury Heights
Year	Republican		Democratic		Third party(ies)	
Year	No.	%	No.	%	No.	%
2025	678	44.37%	839	54.91%	11	0.72%
2021	576	49.87%	571	49.44%	8	0.69%
2017	381	40.36%	535	56.67%	28	2.97%
2013	625	61.70%	371	36.62%	17	1.68%
2009	494	42.19%	532	45.43%	145	12.38%
2005	521	42.67%	649	53.15%	51	4.18%

In the 2013 gubernatorial election, Republican Chris Christie received 61.7% of the vote (625 cast), ahead of Democrat Barbara Buono with 36.6% (371 votes), and other candidates with 1.7% (17 votes), among the 1,040 ballots cast by the borough's 2,249 registered voters (27 ballots were spoiled), for a turnout of 46.2%. In the 2009 gubernatorial election, Democrat Jon Corzine received 44.6% of the vote (532 ballots cast), ahead of Republican Chris Christie with 41.4% (494 votes), Independent Chris Daggett with 11.4% (136 votes) and other candidates with 0.8% (9 votes), among the 1,193 ballots cast by the borough's 2,274 registered voters, yielding a 52.5% turnout.

United States Senate election results for Woodbury Heights1
Year	Republican		Democratic		Third party(ies)	
Year	No.	%	No.	%	No.	%
2024	811	45.13%	966	53.76%	20	1.11%
2018	645	48.57%	620	46.69%	63	4.74%
2012	605	37.28%	986	60.75%	32	1.97%
2006	589	45.41%	676	52.12%	32	2.47%

United States Senate election results for Woodbury Heights2
Year	Republican		Democratic		Third party(ies)	
Year	No.	%	No.	%	No.	%
2020	868	44.97%	1,017	52.69%	45	2.33%
2014	410	40.88%	569	56.73%	24	2.39%
2013	248	48.16%	258	50.10%	9	1.75%
2008	695	41.03%	969	57.20%	30	1.77%

== Education ==
The Woodbury Heights School District serves public school students in kindergarten through sixth grade at Woodbury Heights Elementary School. As of the 2023–24 school year, the district, comprised of one school, had an enrollment of 261 students and 25.6 classroom teachers (on an FTE basis), for a student–teacher ratio of 10.2:1.

For seventh through twelfth grade, public school students attend Gateway Regional High School, a regional public high school established in 1964 that serves students from the boroughs of National Park, Wenonah, Westville and Woodbury Heights, as part of the Gateway Regional High School District. As of the 2023–24 school year, the high school had an enrollment of 875 students and 82.2 classroom teachers (on an FTE basis), for a student–teacher ratio of 10.6:1.

Students from across the county are eligible to apply to attend Gloucester County Institute of Technology, a four-year high school in Deptford Township that provides technical and vocational education. As a public school, students do not pay tuition to attend the school.

St. Margaret Regional School is a PreK–8 elementary school founded in 1963 that operates under the auspices of the Roman Catholic Diocese of Camden.

== Transportation ==
=== Roads and highways ===
As of May 2010, the borough had a total of 18.83 miles (30.30 km) of roadways, of which 14.89 miles (23.96 km) were maintained by the municipality, 2.43 miles (3.91 km) by Gloucester County, 0.53 miles (0.85 km) by the New Jersey Department of Transportation and 0.98 miles (1.58 km) by the New Jersey Turnpike Authority.

County Road 553 passes through the heart of the borough, while Route 45 runs along the borough's western border. The New Jersey Turnpike passes through, but the closest interchange is 15–20 minutes away at Exit 3 in Camden County.

Interstate 295 and Route 55 are accessible in neighboring communities.

=== Public transportation ===
NJ Transit bus service is available on the 410 route between Glassboro and Philadelphia and on the 412 route between Sewell and Philadelphia.

The borough is the site of a planned stop on the Glassboro–Camden Line, an 18-mile (28.97 km) diesel multiple unit light rail system.

== Notable people ==
People who were born in, residents of, or otherwise closely associated with Woodbury Heights include:

- Daniel Webster Cluff (1916–1989), United States Coast Guard officer who led the February 1952 effort that resulted in the rescue of 32 survivors from the SS Pendleton
- Grace Helbig (born 1985), comedian, actress and YouTube personality
- Helen Sommers (1932–2017), politician who served in the Washington House of Representatives from 1972 to 2009
- Stephen Starr (born 1957), CEO of Starr Restaurants
