= Best of the Super Juniors =

Professional wrestling tournament

Best of the Super Juniors trophy

The Best of the Super Juniors (often abbreviated BOSJ) is an annual professional wrestling tournament held by New Japan Pro-Wrestling (NJPW), typically in May or June. Originally known as Top of the Super Juniors, the first tournament was held in 1988 with annual tournaments taking place since 1991. The wrestlers in the tournament are typically junior heavyweight wrestlers from promotions all over the world. As of 2026, NJPW has held 37 Super Juniors tournaments. Hiromu Takahashi holds the record for most tournament wins with four. Takahashi is also the only wrestler to have won three consecutive tournaments. Kanemoto holds the record for the most final appearances, having wrestled eight finals between 1997 and 2009. Liger has participated in the most tournaments, competing in all tournaments except 1995 and 2000 until his 26th and final Super Junior tournament in 2017.

== History and format ==
The tournament was formed in 1988 by NJPW. It was originally called the Top of the Super Juniors. The tournament is a round-robin style tournament where a wrestler scores points. The winner, assuming they are not already the champion, receives an opportunity to wrestle for the IWGP Junior Heavyweight Championship not long after the tournament is over. Since 2010, the title match has taken place at June/July's Dominion event.

In 1994, the tournament was renamed the Best of the Super Juniors. Since 1996 the tournament has been divided into a two-block system used in many other puroresu tournaments. In this format the top two scorers in each block advance to the semifinals, at which point single-elimination rules take effect. During the round-robin portion, a win is worth two points, a time limit draw is worth one, and any other result zero; all matches have a 30-minute time limit, though in the past it has been twenty minutes.

== Pre-existing Junior Heavyweight Tournaments (1981–1986) ==
No.	Year	Winner	Final venue	Attendance	Reference
-	1981	Perro Aguayo	Suzuyo Memorial Gymnasium	unverified	
-	1984	Dynamite Kid	Kuramae Kokugikan	12,000	
-	1986	Shiro Koshinaka	Ryogoku Kokugikan	11,190	

=== 1981 ===
Before the first official Top of the Super Juniors event, NJPW hosted at least three tournaments that shared the round-robin format & junior heavyweight focus. All were to crown a champion. In the case of 1981, it was for the WWF Light Heavyweight Championship (Note: Though the title was technically "light" instead of "junior", sub-heavyweight classes are generally treated as the same broad division within Japanese professional wrestling. Such as in the case of the J-Crown.). Despite being hosted by NJPW, it was essentially a tournament for the Universal Wrestling Association lucha libre promotion, consisted exclusively of its luchadors, and was defended predominantly in Mexico following the crowning of its first champion - Perro Aguayo.

As no point system is readily apparent, wins & draws are listed instead. Gran Hamada had rematches against Anibal and Fishman during the tour, which he also won.

Final standings
Wrestler	W	D	L
Gran Hamada	4	0	0
Perro Aguayo	3	0	1
Aníbal	2	0	2
George Takano	1	0	3
Fishman	0	0	4

Results	Aníbal	Fishman	Takano	Hamada	Aguayo
Aníbal	—N/a	Aníbal (?)	Aníbal (?)	Hamada (9:52)	Perro (?)
Fishman	Aníbal (?)	—N/a	Takano (6:33)	Hamada (?)	Perro (?)
Takano	Aníbal (?)	Takano (6:33)	—N/a	Hamada (?)	Perro (?)
Hamada	Hamada (9:52)	Hamada (?)	Hamada (?)	—N/a	Hamada^{CO} (?)
Aguayo	Perro (?)	Perro (?)	Perro (?)	Hamada^{CO} (?)	—N/a

Final
1	Gran Hamada	Pin
2	Perro Aguayo	14:58

=== 1984 ===
A second tournament for a WWF-commissioned title - 1984's "WWF Junior Heavyweight Championship League" - stretched from January 1 to February 7, 1984. Held as a single block involving nine competitors, the final day featured 3 rematches between the top 3 finishers, with Dynamite Kid winning both of his to claim the title.

Bret Hart and Kuniaki Kobayashi wrestled twice, for unknown reasons. Their first match is counted towards the record shown here, in which Bret won by disqualification. The second match went to a double countout.

Final standings
Wrestler	W	D	L
Dynamite Kid	6	1	1
The Cobra	5	3	0
Davey Boy Smith	5	2	1
Black Tiger	4	1	3
Bret Hart	4	1	3
Kuniaki Kobayashi	2	3	3
Isamu Teranishi	2	1	5
Nobuhiko Takada	1	0	7
Baby Face	0	1	7

Results	Baby	Tiger	Hart	Cobra	Smith	Kid	Teranishi	Kobayashi	Takada
Baby	—N/a	Tiger (11:27)	Hart (10:22)	Cobra (9:31)	Smith (11:46)	Kid (9:30)	DCO (10:49)	Kobayashi (?)	Takada (forfeit)
Tiger	Tiger (11:27)	—N/a	Tiger (9:34)	Cobra (12:55)	Smith (?)	Kid (12:22)	Tiger (11:39)	DCO (10:33)	Tiger (12:25)
Hart	Hart (10:22)	Tiger (9:34)	—N/a	DCO (8:55)	Smith (11:26)	Kid (10:20)	Hart (forfeit)	Hart (10:41)	Hart (6:59)
Cobra	Cobra (9:31)	Cobra (12:55)	DCO (8:55)	—N/a	DCO (6:42)	Cobra (13:01)	Cobra (12:36)	DCO (10:15)	Cobra (14:22)
Smith	Smith (11:46)	Smith (?)	Smith (11:26)	DCO (6:42)	—N/a	Kid (14:11)	Smith (9:52)	Smith (9:57)	Smith (11:15)
Kid	Kid (9:30)	Kid (12:22)	Kid (10:20)	Cobra (13:01)	Kid (14:11)	—N/a	Kid (11:47)	DCO (12:49)	Kid (10:19)
Teranishi	DCO (10:49)	Tiger (11:39)	Hart (forfeit)	Cobra (12:36)	Smith (9:52)	Kid (11:47)	—N/a	Teranishi (6:33)	Teranishi (10:56)
Kobayashi	Kobayashi (?)	DCO (10:33)	Hart (10:41)	DCO (10:15)	Smith (9:57)	DCO (12:49)	Teranishi (6:33)	—N/a	Kobayashi (8:23)
Takada	Takada (forfeit)	Tiger (12:25)	Hart (6:59)	Cobra (14:22)	Smith (11:15)	Kid (10:19)	Teranishi (10:56)	Kobayashi (8:23)	—N/a

Semifinals
2	The Cobra	DCO
3	Davey Boy Smith	9:55
1	Dynamite Kid	CO
3	Davey Boy Smith	14:03

Final
2	The Cobra	Pin
1	Dynamite Kid	6:17

=== 1986 ===
The third prototypical juniors tournament 2 years later was the "IWGP Junior Heavyweight Championship League" to crown the inaugural IWGP Junior Heavyweight Champion. It featured eight competitors, and stretched from January 3 to February 6. Its scoring system was relatively nuanced; a decisive win gave 5 points, a win by countout or disqualification gave 4, and a draw gave 2. Once again it was one block, with a final that re-matched the top two scorers. Shiro Koshinaka won by defeating points-leader The Cobra - whom had gotten disqualified against him during the earlier block stage - to become the first ever IWGP junior champion.

Final standings
Wrestler	Score
The Cobra	28
Shiro Koshinaka	27
Johnny Mantell	26
Tony St. Clair	26
Black Tiger	23
Don Arakawa	12
Scorpio	9
Shunji Kosugi	7
Keiichi Yamada	6

Results	Tiger	Arakawa	Cobra	Mantell	Yamada	Scorpio	Koshinaka	Kosugi	St. Clair
Tiger	—N/a	Tiger^{CO} (7:08)	Cobra (10:59)	Mantell^{DQ} (10:46)	Tiger (14:07)	Tiger (10:36)	DCO (11:10)	Tiger (9:10)	DCO (10:59)
Arakawa	Tiger^{CO} (7:08)	—N/a	Cobra^{DQ} (6:00)	Mantell^{DQ} (6:23)	Arakawa (11:01)	Scorpio^{DQ} (7:52)	DCO (12:21)	Arakawa (10:31)	St. Clair (4:57)
Cobra	Cobra (10:59)	Cobra^{DQ} (6:00)	—N/a	Cobra (10:18)	DCO (11:45)	Cobra (10:37)	Koshinaka^{DQ} (7:45)	Cobra (12:00)	DCO (10:31)
Mantell	Mantell^{DQ} (10:46)	Mantell^{DQ} (6:23)	Cobra (10:18)	—N/a	Mantell (15:43)	Mantell (11:00)	Mantell^{CO} (11:35)	DCO (10:02)	DCO (12:13)
Yamada	Tiger (14:07)	Arakawa (11:01)	DCO (11:45)	Mantell (15:43)	—N/a	Yamada^{CO} (12:30)	Koshinaka (13:56)	Kosugi (12:34)	St. Clair (8:37)
Scorpio	Tiger (10:36)	Scorpio^{DQ} (7:52)	Cobra (10:37)	Mantell (11:00)	Yamada^{CO} (12:30)	—N/a	Koshinaka (7:01)	Scorpio (10:44)	St. Clair (10:59)
Koshinaka	DCO (11:10)	DCO (12:21)	Koshinaka^{DQ} (7:45)	Mantell^{CO} (11:35)	Koshinaka (13:56)	Koshinaka (7:01)	—N/a	Koshinaka^{CO} (12:12)	Koshinaka (9:26)
Kosugi	Tiger (9:10)	Arakawa (10:31)	Cobra (12:00)	DCO (10:02)	Kosugi (12:34)	Scorpio (10:44)	Koshinaka^{CO} (12:12)	—N/a	St. Clair (9:13)
St. Clair	DCO (10:59)	St. Clair (4:57)	DCO (10:31)	DCO (12:13)	St. Clair (8:37)	St. Clair (10:59)	Koshinaka (9:26)	St. Clair (9:13)	—N/a

Final
1	The Cobra	Pin
2	Shiro Koshinaka	15:22

== Top of the Super Juniors (1988–1993) ==
No.	Year	Winner	Final venue	Attendance	Reference
I	1988	Shiro Koshinaka	Nakajima Sports Center	6,150	
-	1990	Jushin Thunder Liger	Gifu Industrial Hall	unverified	
II	1991	Norio Honaga	Ryōgoku Kokugikan	11,500	
III	1992	Jushin Thunder Liger	Ryōgoku Kokugikan	11,500	
IV	1993	Pegasus Kid	Osaka Prefectural Gymnasium	6,580	

=== 1988 ===
The 1988 Top of the Super Juniors was a 12-man tournament held from January 4 to February 7. The points system from 1986 was carried over, with wins by forfeit also counting for 4 points. The two wrestlers with the most points at the end of the tournament, Shiro Koshinaka and reigning IWGP Junior Heavyweight Champion Hiroshi Hase, faced off in a singles match to determine the winner. The winner, Koshinaka, went on to win the Junior Championship from Owen Hart on June 24, 1988, after failing to win the title from Hiroshi Hase twice on March 19 and May 8.

Norio Honaga presumably withdrew due to injury, as he wrestled in tag matches on the first two days of the tour, then did not wrestle again until weeks after the tournament had finished.

Final standings
Wrestler	Score
Shiro Koshinaka	41
Hiroshi Hase	41
Nobuhiko Takada	40
Owen Hart	39
Kazuo Yamazaki	38
Keiichi Yamada	31
Kuniaki Kobayashi	24
Hiro Saito	24
Tony St. Clair	14
Tatsutoshi Goto	9
Masakatsu Funaki	8
Norio Honaga	0

Results	Saito	Hase	Yamazaki	Yamada	Kobayashi	Funaki	Takada	Honaga	Hart	Koshinaka	Goto	St. Clair
Saito	—N/a	Hase (13:27)	Yamazaki (13:22)	Saito (11:11)	Kobayashi (12:36)	Saito (7:32)	Takada (12:28)	Saito (forfeit)	Hart (11:49)	Koshinaka (12:03)	Saito (12:28)	Saito (12:29)
Hase	Hase (13:27)	—N/a	Yamazaki (11:26)	Hase (12:38)	Kobayashi (10:51)	Hase (10:09)	DCO (13:31)	Hase (forfeit)	Hase (13:09)	Hase (12:04)	Hase (13:49)	Hase (12:13)
Yamazaki	Yamazaki (13:22)	Yamazaki (11:26)	—N/a	Yamada (10:07)	Yamazaki^{DQ} (15:06)	Yamazaki (13:28)	Yamazaki (14:08)	Yamazaki (forfeit)	Hart (12:56)	Koshinaka (12:58)	Yamazaki (11:55)	Yamazaki (8:55)
Yamada	Saito (11:11)	Hase (12:38)	Yamada (10:07)	—N/a	Kobayashi (16:12)	Yamada (9:24)	DCO (12:28)	Yamada (forfeit)	Yamada (10:54)	Koshinaka (18:14)	Yamada (13:18)	Yamada (10:01)
Kobayashi	Kobayashi (12:36)	Kobayashi (10:51)	Yamazaki^{DQ} (15:06)	Kobayashi (16:12)	—N/a	Funaki^{CO} (9:10)	Takada (10:18)	Kobayashi (forfeit)	Hart (10:34)	Koshinaka (13:49)	Kobayashi (11:12)	Kobayashi (11:09)
Funaki	Saito (7:32)	Hase (10:09)	Yamazaki (13:28)	Yamada (9:24)	Funaki^{CO} (9:10)	—N/a	Takada (20:05)	Funaki (forfeit)	Hart (10:55)	Koshinaka (12:04)	Goto (10:28)	St. Clair (7:32)
Takada	Takada (12:28)	DCO (13:31)	Yamazaki (14:08)	DCO (12:28)	Takada (10:18)	Takada (20:05)	—N/a	Takada (forfeit)	Takada (13:43)	DKO (20:34)	Takada (19:34)	Takada (11:29)
Honaga	Saito (forfeit)	Hase (forfeit)	Yamazaki (forfeit)	Yamada (forfeit)	Kobayashi (forfeit)	Funaki (forfeit)	Takada (forfeit)	—N/a	Hart (forfeit)	Koshinaka (forfeit)	Goto (forfeit)	St. Clair (forfeit)
Hart	Hart (11:49)	Hase (13:09)	Hart (12:56)	Yamada (10:54)	Hart (10:34)	Hart (10:55)	Takada (13:43)	Hart (forfeit)	—N/a	Hart (15:00)	Hart (7:57)	Hart (11:28)
Koshinaka	Koshinaka (12:03)	Hase (12:04)	Koshinaka (12:58)	Koshinaka (18:14)	Koshinaka (13:49)	Koshinaka (12:04)	DKO (20:34)	Koshinaka (forfeit)	Hart (15:00)	—N/a	Koshinaka (8:12)	Koshinaka (9:50)
Goto	Saito (12:28)	Hase (13:49)	Yamazaki (11:55)	Yamada (13:18)	Kobayashi (11:12)	Goto (10:28)	Takada (19:34)	Goto (forfeit)	Hart (7:57)	Koshinaka (8:12)	—N/a	St. Clair (7:47)
St. Clair	Saito (12:29)	Hase (12:13)	Yamazaki (8:55)	Yamada (10:01)	Kobayashi (11:09)	St. Clair (7:32)	Takada (11:29)	St. Clair (forfeit)	Hart (11:28)	Koshinaka (9:50)	St. Clair (7:47)	—N/a

Final
1	Hiroshi Hase	Pin
2	Shiro Koshinaka	16:43

=== 1990 ===
Whilst there was not a named "Super Juniors" event in 1990, there was nonetheless a month-long round-robin junior heavyweight tournament in the same vein at the beginning of the year, to establish a #1 contender for the championship. The block matches took place on the "NJPW New Spring Gold Series 1990" tour, stretching from January 5 to January 30, with the winner receiving their championship match at the tour's finale on January 31. There was no "final", with individual wins (of any type, ending the system from the previous two tournaments) being worth 5 point each and the overall winner being whoever accrued the most points. Jushin Thunder Liger won the tournament by last defeating Owen Hart, and defeated Naoki Sano to regain the title that Sano had defeated him for months prior, thus beginning his second reign.

As in the previous tournament, Norio Honaga was originally booked to compete, and instead forfeited all of his matches. Strangely however, on this occasion he was still present throughout the tour, instead wrestling in tag matches alongside "Blond Outlaws" teammate Tatsutoshi Goto. Biff Wellington likewise forfeited his final 2 matches, presumably due to injury (as he did not wrestle again for several months).

A block match between Hiro Saito & Akira Nogami did not take place, possibly due to both having been mathematically eliminated from the tournament.

Final standings
Wrestler	Score
Jushin Thunder Liger	40
Owen Hart	35
Takayuki Iizuka	30
Hiro Saito	30
Akira Nogami	25
Biff Wellington	20
Black Tiger	20
Osamu Matsuda	10
Hirokazu Hata	10
Norio Honaga	0

Results	Nogami	Wellington	Tiger	Saito	Hata	Liger	Honaga	Matsuda	Hart	Iizuka
Nogami	—N/a	Nogami (forfeit)	Nogami (9:26)	-	Nogami (13:13)	Liger (11:52)	Nogami (forfeit)	Nogami (14:44)	Hart (11:36)	Iizuka (?)
Wellington	Nogami (forfeit)	—N/a	Tiger (forfeit)	Saito (6:03)	Wellington (7:03)	Liger (4:48)	Wellington (forfeit)	Wellington (5:50)	Hart (9:02)	Wellington (8:02)
Tiger	Nogami (9:26)	Tiger (forfeit)	—N/a	Saito (?)	Tiger (8:51)	Liger (11:28)	Tiger (forfeit)	Tiger (10:12)	Hart (12:30)	Iizuka (?)
Saito	-	Saito (6:03)	Saito (?)	—N/a	Saito (8:25)	Saito (12:53)	Saito (forfeit)	Saito (10:08)	Hart (12:23)	Iizuka (8:19)
Hata	Nogami (13:13)	Wellington (7:03)	Tiger (8:51)	Saito (8:25)	—N/a	Liger (12:13)	Hata (forfeit)	Hata (10:26)	Hart (12:02)	Iizuka (12:30)
Liger	Liger (11:52)	Liger (4:48)	Liger (11:28)	Saito (12:53)	Liger (12:13)	—N/a	Liger (forfeit)	Liger (11:29)	Liger (12:28)	Liger (14:53)
Honaga	Nogami (forfeit)	Wellington (forfeit)	Tiger (forfeit)	Saito (forfeit)	Hata (forfeit)	Liger (forfeit)	—N/a	Matsuda (forfeit)	Hart (forfeit)	Iizuka (forfeit)
Matsuda	Nogami (14:44)	Wellington (5:50)	Tiger (10:12)	Saito (10:08)	Hata (10:26)	Liger (11:29)	Matsuda (forfeit)	—N/a	Hart (8:25)	Matsuda (13:45)
Hart	Hart (11:36)	Hart (9:02)	Hart (12:30)	Hart (12:23)	Hart (12:02)	Liger (12:28)	Hart (forfeit)	Hart (8:25)	—N/a	Iizuka (?)
Iizuka	Iizuka (?)	Wellington (8:02)	Iizuka (?)	Iizuka (8:19)	Iizuka (12:30)	Liger (14:53)	Iizuka (forfeit)	Matsuda (13:45)	Iizuka (?)	—N/a

=== 1991 ===
The 1991 Top of the Super Juniors was a seven-man tournament held from April 15 to April 30 and the first to use the modern points system. Before the tournament, the reigning Junior Heavyweight Champion, Jushin Thunder Liger, vacated the title so the winner of the 1991 Top of the Super Juniors also became the champion; with his victory over Liger in the final, Norio Honaga also won the championship.

Final standings
Wrestler	Score
Norio Honaga	8
Jushin Thunder Liger	8
Pegasus Kid	8
Negro Casas	8
Owen Hart	6
David Finlay	4
Flyin' Scorpio	0

Results	Casas	Finlay	Hart	Honaga	Kid	Liger	Scorpio
Casas	—N/a	Casas (5:33)	Casas (6:45)	Honaga (6:35)	Kid (11:52)	Casas (6:51)	Casas (6:31)
Finlay	Casas (5:33)	—N/a	Hart (8:35)	Honaga (6:25)	Finlay (7:04)	Liger (11:38)	Finlay (7:56)
Hart	Casas (6:45)	Hart (8:35)	—N/a	Honaga (7:23)	Hart (11:04)	Liger (14:58)	Hart (7:55)
Honaga	Honaga (6:35)	Honaga (6:25)	Honaga (7:23)	—N/a	Kid (9:22)	Liger (9:44)	Honaga (7:51)
Kid	Kid (11:52)	Finlay (7:04)	Hart (11:04)	Kid (9:22)	—N/a	Kid (14:01)	Kid
Liger	Casas (6:51)	Liger (11:38)	Liger (14:58)	Liger (9:44)	Kid (14:01)	—N/a	Liger (8:46)
Scorpio	Casas (6:31)	Finlay (7:56)	Hart (7:55)	Honaga (7:51)	Kid	Liger (8:46)	—N/a

Semifinals
1	Norio Honaga	Pin
3	Pegasus Kid	9:21
2	Jushin Thunder Liger	Pin
4	Negro Casas	11:14

Final
1	Norio Honaga	Pin
2	Jushin Thunder Liger	21:54

=== 1992 ===
The 1992 Top of the Super Juniors was a nine-man tournament, held from April 16 to April 30. The winner, Jushin Thunder Liger, became the first man to win the tournament while holding the IWGP Junior Heavyweight Championship. Finalist El Samurai - one of only two men to score a win over Liger in the tournament - was Liger's next title challenger on May 17, where Samurai lost, and once again on June 26, where he won the championship.

Final standings
Wrestler	Score
El Samurai	14
Jushin Thunder Liger	12
Norio Honaga	12
Negro Casas	10
Pegasus Kid	10
David Finlay	6
Eddie Guerrero	4
Flyin' Scorpio	2
Koji Kanemoto	2

Results	Finlay	Guerrero	Samurai	Scorpio	Liger	Kanemoto	Casas	Honaga	Kid
Finlay	—N/a	Finlay (12:16)	Samurai (11:08)	Finlay (10:58)	Liger (11:52)	Finlay (10:43)	Casas (9:37)	Honaga (9:26)	Kid (9:29)
Guerrero	Finlay (12:16)	—N/a	Samurai (10:10)	Guerrero (13:48)	Liger (12:13)	Guerrero (11:05)	Casas (7:28)	Honaga (9:34)	Kid (12:06)
Samurai	Samurai (11:08)	Samurai (10:10)	—N/a	Samurai (10:51)	Samurai (15:34)	Samurai (11:29)	Samurai (5:44)	Honaga (10:00)	Samurai (9:36)
Scorpio	Finlay (10:58)	Guerrero (13:48)	Samurai (10:51)	—N/a	Liger (11:23)	Scorpio (12:52)	Casas (10:05)	Honaga (7:07)	Kid (9:55)
Liger	Liger (11:52)	Liger (12:13)	Samurai (15:34)	Liger (11:23)	—N/a	Liger (10:08)	Liger (7:24)	Liger (12:14)	Kid (12:42)
Kanemoto	Finlay (10:43)	Guerrero (11:05)	Samurai (11:29)	Scorpio (12:52)	Liger (10:08)	—N/a	Kanemoto (9:14)	Honaga (5:15)	Kid (10:53)
Casas	Casas (9:37)	Casas (7:28)	Samurai (5:44)	Casas (10:05)	Liger (7:24)	Kanemoto (9:14)	—N/a	Casas (8:56)	Casas (11:38)
Honaga	Honaga (9:26)	Honaga (9:34)	Honaga (10:00)	Honaga (7:07)	Liger (12:14)	Honaga (5:15)	Casas (8:56)	—N/a	Honaga (8:00)
Kid	Kid (9:29)	Kid (12:06)	Samurai (9:36)	Kid (9:55)	Kid (12:42)	Kid (10:53)	Casas (11:38)	Honaga (8:00)	—N/a

Semifinal			Final
			1	El Samurai	Pin
2	Jushin Thunder Liger	Pin	2	Jushin Thunder Liger	21:15
3	Norio Honaga	14:26

=== 1993 ===
The 1993 Top of the Super Juniors was an 11-man tournament held from May 26 to June 14. As the result of a four-way tie for second place (Jushin Thunder Liger was also tied, but was eliminated due to injury), the four men held a playoff tournament to challenge first-place Pegasus Kid (better known as Chris Benoit) in the final; this ended up being El Samurai, who would nonetheless fall against Pegasus Kid. Pegasus became the first foreign wrestler to win the tournament as a result. He also went on to challenge the champion Liger unsuccessfully on August 8. Eddie Guerrero participated in the 1992 tournament under his real name, but wrestled in the 1993 tournament as the second incarnation of "Black Tiger"

Final standings
Wrestler	Score
Pegasus Kid	14
Black Tiger II	12
El Samurai	12
Dean Malenko	12
Flyin' Scorpio	12
Jushin Thunder Liger	12
David Finlay	10
Norio Honaga	10
Lightning Kid	8
Shinjiro Otani	4
Masao Orihara	4

Results	Tiger	Finlay	Malenko	Samurai	Scorpio	Liger	Lightning	Orihara	Honaga	Pegasus	Otani
Tiger	—N/a	Finlay (9:57)	Tiger (12:45)	Tiger (11:25)	Tiger (7:25)	Tiger (14:39)	Lightning (11:30)	Tiger (forfeit)	Tiger (11:25)	Pegasus (13:00)	Otani (13:28)
Finlay	Finlay (9:57)	—N/a	Finlay (11:51)	Samurai (15:05)	Finlay (10:21)	Liger (11:24)	Lightning (6:29)	Orihara (9:26)	Finlay (7:03)	Pegasus (8:02)	Finlay (9:17)
Malenko	Tiger (12:45)	Finlay (11:51)	—N/a	Samurai (12:13)	Malenko (13:29)	Malenko (17:23)	Malenko (11:15)	Malenko (forfeit)	Malenko (11:05)	Pegasus (9:41)	Malenko (10:51)
Samurai	Tiger (11:25)	Samurai (15:05)	Samurai (12:13)	—N/a	Samurai (10:25)	Liger (13:27)	Samurai (11:09)	Orihara (11:39)	Samurai (9:06)	Pegasus (10:52)	Samurai (12:05)
Scorpio	Tiger (7:25)	Finlay (10:21)	Malenko (13:29)	Samurai (10:25)	—N/a	Scorpio (3:30)	Scorpio (8:54)	Scorpio (forfeit)	Scorpio (7:37)	Scorpio (11:00)	Scorpio (8:52)
Liger	Tiger (14:39)	Liger (11:24)	Malenko (17:23)	Liger (13:27)	Scorpio (3:30)	—N/a	Liger (10:50)	Liger (forfeit)	Honaga (12:51)	Liger (15:05)	Liger (11:57)
Lightning	Lightning (11:30)	Lightning (6:29)	Malenko (11:15)	Samurai (11:09)	Scorpio (8:54)	Liger (10:50)	—N/a	Lightning (forfeit)	Honaga (4:42)	Pegasus (12:13)	Lightning (12:46)
Orihara	Tiger (forfeit)	Orihara (9:26)	Malenko (forfeit)	Orihara (11:39)	Scorpio (forfeit)	Liger (forfeit)	Lightning (forfeit)	—N/a	Honaga (forfeit)	Pegasus (9:18)	Otani (forfeit)
Honaga	Tiger (11:25)	Finlay (7:03)	Malenko (11:05)	Samurai (9:06)	Scorpio (7:37)	Honaga (12:51)	Honaga (4:42)	Honaga (forfeit)	—N/a	Honaga (7:06)	Honaga (8:39)
Pegasus	Pegasus (13:00)	Pegasus (8:02)	Pegasus (9:41)	Pegasus (10:52)	Scorpio (11:00)	Liger (15:05)	Pegasus (12:13)	Pegasus (9:18)	Honaga (7:06)	—N/a	Pegasus
Otani	Otani (13:28)	Finlay (9:17)	Malenko (10:51)	Samurai (12:05)	Scorpio (8:52)	Liger (11:57)	Lightning (12:46)	Otani (forfeit)	Honaga (8:39)	Pegasus	—N/a

Quarterfinals
2	Black Tiger II	Sub
4	Dean Malenko	13:51
3	El Samurai	Pin
5	Flyin' Scorpio	10:16

Semifinals
4	Dean Malenko	Pin
3	El Samurai	12:20

Final
1	Pegasus Kid	Pin
3	El Samurai	18:44

== Best of the Super Juniors (1994–present) ==
No.	Year	Winner	Total won	Final venue	Attendance	Reference
I	1994	Jushin Thunder Liger	1 (2)	Osaka Prefectural Gymnasium	6,580	
II	1995	Wild Pegasus	1 (2)	Sapporo Nakajima Sports Center	6,500	
III	1996	Black Tiger II	1	Osaka Prefectural Gymnasium	6,650	
IV	1997	El Samurai	1	Nippon Budokan	14,000	
V	1998	Koji Kanemoto	1	Osaka Municipal Central Gymnasium	8,000	
VI	1999	Kendo Kashin	1	Nippon Budokan	13,600	
VII	2000	Tatsuhito Takaiwa	1	Osaka Municipal Central Gymnasium	6,200	
VIII	2001	Jushin Thunder Liger	2 (3)	Osaka Prefectural Gymnasium	5,700	
IX	2002	Koji Kanemoto	2	Osaka Prefectural Gymnasium	5,200	
X	2003	Masahito Kakihara	1	Kyoto City Gymnasium	4,500	
XI	2004	Tiger Mask IV	1	Korakuen Hall	1,861	
XII	2005	Tiger Mask IV	2	Korakuen Hall	2,005	
XIII	2006	Minoru	1	Korakuen Hall	1,646	
XIV	2007	Milano Collection A.T.	1	Korakuen Hall	2,005	
XV	2008	Wataru Inoue	1	Korakuen Hall	2,010	
XVI	2009	Koji Kanemoto	3	Korakuen Hall	2,005	
XVII	2010	Prince Devitt	1	Korakuen Hall	2,005	
XVIII	2011	Kota Ibushi	1	Korakuen Hall	2,005	
XIX	2012	Ryusuke Taguchi	1	Korakuen Hall	2,050	
XX	2013	Prince Devitt	2	Korakuen Hall	2,015	
XXI	2014	Ricochet	1	Yoyogi 2nd Gymnasium	3,014	
XXII	2015	Kushida	1	Yoyogi 2nd Gymnasium	3,250	
XXIII	2016	Will Ospreay	1	Sendai Sun Plaza Hall	2,167	
24	2017	Kushida	2	Yoyogi 2nd Gymnasium	3,454	
25	2018	Hiromu Takahashi	1	Korakuen Hall	1,740	
26	2019	Will Ospreay	2	Ryōgoku Kokugikan	7,650	
27	2020	Hiromu Takahashi	2	Nippon Budokan	3,564	
28	2021	Hiromu Takahashi	3	Ryōgoku Kokugikan	3,215	
29	2022	Hiromu Takahashi	4	Nippon Budokan	3,250	
30	2023	Master Wato	1	Ota City General Gymnasium	3,132	
31	2024	El Desperado	1	Osaka-jo Hall	7,254	
32	2025	Kosei Fujita	1	Ota City General Gymnasium	3,044	
33	2026	Yoh	1	Ota City General Gymnasium	3,969	

=== 1994 ===
The 1994 Best of the Super Juniors, the first tournament to be held under that name, was an 11-man tournament contested from May 26 to June 13. Jushin Thunder Liger once again won while also the reigning Junior Heavyweight champion, and also became the first wrestler to win the tournament twice. Guest natives included Super Delfin and Taka Michinoku from Michinoku Pro Wrestling and Masayoshi Motegi from Wrestle Dream Factory. Liger did not defend the title again before an ankle injury forced him to vacate it in September, instigating another tournament to crown a new champion.

Final standings
Wrestler	Score
Jushin Thunder Liger	14
Super Delfin	14
El Samurai	12
Wild Pegasus	12
Black Tiger II	12
Dean Malenko	12
Shinjiro Otani	10
Tokimitsu Ishizawa	8
David Finlay	8
Taka Michinoku	4
Masayoshi Motegi	2

Results	Liger	Delfin	Samurai	Pegasus	Tiger	Malenko	Otani	Ishizawa	Finlay	Taka	Motegi
Liger	—N/a	Liger (19:33)	Samurai (18:20)	Liger (16:06)	Liger (17:36)	Malenko (16:07)	Liger (18:52)	Liger (17:16)	Finlay (10:15)	Liger (7:54)	Liger (13:04)
Delfin	Liger (19:33)	—N/a	Samurai (13:59)	Pegasus (13:58)	Delfin (13:13)	Delfin (13:49)	Delfin (14:00)	Delfin (9:42)	Finlay (11:51)	Delfin (11:46)	Delfin (10:55)
Samurai	Samurai (18:20)	Samurai (13:59)	—N/a	Draw (30:00)	Tiger (11:29)	Malenko (16:24)	Otani (14:10)	Samurai (11:24)	Samurai (forfeit)	Samurai (8:16)	Samurai (9:38)
Pegasus	Liger (16:06)	Pegasus (13:58)	Draw (30:00)	—N/a	Tiger (13:38)	Pegasus (14:04)	Otani (10:36)	Pegasus (12:34)	Pegasus (11:53)	Pegasus (4:35)	Pegasus (13:20)
Tiger	Liger (17:36)	Delfin (13:13)	Tiger (11:29)	Tiger (13:38)	—N/a	Malenko (11:42)	Otani (13:48)	Tiger (12:15)	Tiger (10:56)	Tiger (8:28)	Tiger (8:00)
Malenko	Malenko (16:07)	Delfin (13:49)	Malenko (16:24)	Pegasus (14:04)	Malenko (11:42)	—N/a	Malenko (16:56)	Ishizawa (14:16)	Finlay (10:10)	Malenko (12:40)	Malenko (12:55)
Otani	Liger (18:52)	Delfin (14:00)	Otani (14:10)	Otani (10:36)	Otani (13:48)	Malenko (16:56)	—N/a	Ishizawa (10:03)	Finlay (12:26)	Otani (0:16)	Otani (7:48)
Ishizawa	Liger (17:16)	Delfin (9:42)	Samurai (11:24)	Pegasus (12:34)	Tiger (12:15)	Ishizawa (14:16)	Ishizawa (10:03)	—N/a	Ishizawa (forfeit)	Taka (9:41)	Ishizawa (10:44)
Finlay	Finlay (10:15)	Finlay (11:51)	Samurai (forfeit)	Pegasus (11:53)	Tiger (10:56)	Finlay (10:10)	Finlay (12:26)	Ishizawa (forfeit)	—N/a	Finlay (10:21)	Motegi (9:06)
Taka	Liger (7:54)	Delfin (11:46)	Samurai (8:16)	Pegasus (4:35)	Tiger (8:28)	Malenko (12:40)	Otani (0:16)	Taka (9:41)	Finlay (10:21)	—N/a	Taka (10:00)
Motegi	Liger (13:04)	Delfin (10:55)	Samurai (9:38)	Pegasus (13:20)	Tiger (8:00)	Malenko (12:55)	Otani (7:48)	Ishizawa (10:44)	Motegi (9:06)	Taka (10:00)	—N/a

Final
1	Jushin Thunder Liger	Pin
2	Super Delfin	18:29

=== 1995 ===
The 1995 Best of the Super Juniors was a 10-man tournament held from June 23 to July 13. Like Jushin Thunder Liger the year prior, Wild Pegasus (formerly Pegasus Kid) won the tournament for the second time and was the only non Japanese to do so until Prince Devitt won the tournament in 2010. Norio Honaga injured his ribs after the fourth day, so he forfeited his remaining matches. Like in 1993, Pegasus failed in his championship challenge, this time against Koji Kanemoto on September 25, 1995. Gran Hamada from Michinoku Pro Wrestling was the guest native.

Final standings
Wrestler	Score
Wild Pegasus	10
Shinjiro Otani	10
Black Tiger II	10
Koji Kanemoto	10
Dean Malenko	9
Gran Hamada	9
El Samurai	9
Brian Pillman	8
Alex Wright	8
Norio Honaga	4

Results	Pegasus	Otani	Tiger	Kanemoto	Malenko	Hamada	Pillman	Samurai	Wright	Honaga
Pegasus	—N/a	Pegasus (14:28)	Tiger (20:20)	Pegasus (16:30)	Pegasus (16:34)	Pegasus (12:22)	Pillman (11:11)	Draw (30:00)	Pegasus (13:30)	Honaga (9:39)
Otani	Pegasus (14:28)	—N/a	Otani (16:37)	Draw (30:00)	Malenko (14:00)	Otani (12:52)	Otani (11:38)	Samurai (13:47)	Otani (14:53)	Otani (forfeit)
Tiger	Tiger (20:20)	Otani (16:37)	—N/a	Tiger (17:45)	Malenko (17:39)	Hamada (13:02)	Pillman (13:32)	Tiger (12:03)	Tiger (11:30)	Tiger (forfeit)
Kanemoto	Pegasus (16:30)	Draw (30:00)	Tiger (17:45)	—N/a	Kanemoto (15:27)	Hamada (11:08)	Kanemoto (11:15)	Kanemoto (14:58)	Kanemoto (15:13)	Kanemoto (forfeit)
Malenko	Pegasus (16:34)	Malenko (14:00)	Malenko (17:39)	Kanemoto (15:27)	—N/a	Draw (30:00)	Malenko (9:56)	Samurai (12:10)	Malenko (13:37)	Honaga (10:28)
Hamada	Pegasus (12:22)	Otani (12:52)	Hamada (13:02)	Hamada (11:08)	Draw (30:00)	—N/a	Hamada (12:36)	Samurai (12:21)	Wright (11:47)	Hamada (forfeit)
Pillman	Pillman (11:11)	Otani (11:38)	Pillman (13:32)	Kanemoto (11:15)	Malenko (9:56)	Hamada (12:36)	—N/a	Pillman (11:43)	Wright (11:17)	Pillman (forfeit)
Samurai	Draw (30:00)	Samurai (13:47)	Tiger (12:03)	Kanemoto (14:58)	Samurai (12:10)	Samurai (12:21)	Pillman (11:43)	—N/a	Wright (10:41)	Samurai (forfeit)
Wright	Pegasus (13:30)	Otani (14:53)	Tiger (11:30)	Kanemoto (15:13)	Malenko (13:37)	Wright (11:47)	Wright (11:17)	Wright (10:41)	—N/a	Wright (8:36)
Honaga	Honaga (9:39)	Otani (forfeit)	Tiger (forfeit)	Kanemoto (forfeit)	Honaga (10:28)	Hamada (forfeit)	Pillman (forfeit)	Samurai (forfeit)	Wright (8:36)	—N/a

Semifinals
1	Wild Pegasus	Pin
3	Black Tiger II	16:37
2	Shinjiro Otani	Pin
4	Koji Kanemoto	15:24

Final
1	Wild Pegasus	Pin
2	Shinjiro Otani	19:16

=== 1996 ===
The 1996 Best of the Super Juniors was held from May 24 to June 12 and was the first to use the two-block format, featuring seven wrestlers in each block. The winner, Black Tiger, would unsuccessfully challenge The Great Sasuke for the championship on June 17, 1996.

Final standings
Block A		Block B	
El Samurai	10	Black Tiger II	10
Wild Pegasus	10	Jushin Thunder Liger	8
Tatsuhito Takaiwa	8	Shinjiro Otani	6
Franz Schumann	2	Dean Malenko	6
Emilio Charles Jr.	2	Norio Honaga	4
Mr. J.L.	2	Tokimitsu Ishizawa	4
Koji Kanemoto	2	Villano IV	2

Block A	Charles	J.L.	Kanemoto	Pegasus	Samurai	Schumann	Takaiwa
Charles	—N/a	N/A	N/A	Pegasus (forfeit)	Samurai (forfeit)	Schumann (forfeit)	Takaiwa (N/A)
J.L.	N/A	—N/a	N/A	Pegasus (11:14)	Samurai (8:36)	J.L. (9:27)	Takaiwa (N/A)
Kanemoto	N/A	N/A	—N/a	Pegasus (N/A)	Samurai (N/A)	N/A	Takaiwa (N/A)
Pegasus	Pegasus (forfeit)	Pegasus (11:14)	Pegasus (N/A)	—N/a	Samurai (16:07)	Pegasus (11:14)	Pegasus (8:28)
Samurai	Samurai (forfeit)	Samurai (8:36)	Samurai (N/A)	Samurai (16:07)	—N/a	Samurai (N/A)	Takaiwa (11:59)
Schumann	Schumann (forfeit)	J.L. (9:27)	N/A	Pegasus (11:14)	Samurai (N/A)	—N/a	Schumann (8:52)
Takaiwa	Takaiwa (N/A)	Takaiwa (N/A)	Takaiwa (N/A)	Pegasus (8:28)	Takaiwa (11:59)	Schumann (8:52)	—N/a
Block B	Honaga	Ishizawa	Liger	Malenko	Otani	Tiger	Villano
Honaga	—N/a	Honaga (11:41)	Liger (11:29)	Malenko (9:33)	Honaga (13:13)	Tiger (N/A)	Villano (8:02)
Ishizawa	Honaga (11:41)	—N/a	Liger (13:53)	Ishizawa (8:06)	Otani (8:26)	Tiger (12:40)	Ishizawa (10:13)
Liger	Liger (11:29)	Liger (13:53)	—N/a	Malenko (14:22)	Liger (17:42)	Tiger (13:27)	Liger (9:11)
Malenko	Malenko (9:33)	Ishizawa (8:06)	Malenko (14:22)	—N/a	Otani (14:47)	Tiger (18:30)	Malenko (N/A)
Otani	Honaga (13:13)	Otani (8:26)	Liger (17:42)	Otani (14:47)	—N/a	Otani (15:20)	Otani (9:35)
Tiger	Tiger (N/A)	Tiger (12:40)	Tiger (13:27)	Tiger (18:30)	Otani (15:20)	—N/a	Tiger (12:08)
Villano	Villano (8:02)	Ishizawa (10:13)	Liger (9:11)	Malenko (N/A)	Otani (9:35)	Tiger (12:08)	—N/a

Semifinals
A1	El Samurai	Pin
B2	Jushin Thunder Liger	15:11
B1	Black Tiger II	Pin
A2	Wild Pegasus	20:17

Final
B2	Jushin Thunder Liger	Pin
B1	Black Tiger II	18:44

=== 1997 ===
The 1997 Best of the Super Juniors was a two-block, 14-man tournament held from May 16 to June 5. This and the following tournament in 1998 would utilize a points system that involved simply one point for a win, and zero for a loss or draw. The winner, El Samurai, went on to defeat Jushin Thunder Liger for the championship on July 6. Guest natives included Gran Naniwa and Hanzo Nakajima from Michinoku Pro Wrestling and Yoshihiro Tajiri from Big Japan Pro Wrestling. The final pitting Kanemoto against Samurai was awarded five stars by Dave Meltzer.

Final standings
Block A		Block B	
Koji Kanemoto	5	El Samurai	5
Jushin Thunder Liger	4	Shinjiro Otani	4
Tatsuhito Takaiwa	4	Chris Jericho	4
Gran Naniwa	3	Hanzo Nakajima	3
Dr. Wagner Jr.	2	Yoshihiro Tajiri	3
Doc Dean	2	Scorpio Jr.	1
Chavo Guerrero Jr.	1	Robbie Brookside	1

Block A	Dean	Guerrero	Kanemoto	Liger	Naniwa	Takaiwa	Wagner
Dean	—N/a	Dean (16:04)	Kanemoto (10:27)	Dean (11:51)	Naniwa (12:29)	Takaiwa (11:36)	Wagner (7:29)
Guerrero	Dean (16:04)	—N/a	Kanemoto (15:12)	Liger (10:20)	Guerrero (11:05)	Takaiwa (12:14)	Wagner (11:13)
Kanemoto	Kanemoto (10:27)	Kanemoto (15:12)	—N/a	Kanemoto (16:32)	Kanemoto (14:53)	Takaiwa (18:09)	Kanemoto (12:11)
Liger	Dean (11:51)	Liger (10:20)	Kanemoto (16:32)	—N/a	Liger (16:32)	Liger (15:53)	Liger (12:59)
Naniwa	Naniwa (12:29)	Guerrero (11:05)	Kanemoto (14:53)	Liger (16:32)	—N/a	Naniwa (15:41)	Naniwa (12:39)
Takaiwa	Takaiwa (11:36)	Takaiwa (12:14)	Takaiwa (18:09)	Liger (15:53)	Naniwa (15:41)	—N/a	Takaiwa (9:53)
Wagner	Wagner (7:29)	Wagner (11:13)	Kanemoto (12:11)	Liger (12:59)	Naniwa (12:39)	Takaiwa (9:53)	—N/a
Block B	Brookside	Jericho	Nakajima	Otani	Samurai	Scorpio	Tajiri
Brookside	—N/a	Brookside (13:43)	Nakajima (12:23)	Otani (15:31)	Samurai (11:32)	Scorpio (10:07)	Tajiri (11:34)
Jericho	Brookside (13:43)	—N/a	Jericho (10:53)	Otani (12:59)	Jericho (15:12)	Jericho (11:16)	Jericho (13:36)
Nakajima	Nakajima (12:23)	Jericho (10:53)	—N/a	Otani (12:26)	Samurai (14:30)	Nakajima (8:05)	Nakajima (9:18)
Otani	Otani (15:31)	Otani (12:59)	Otani (12:26)	—N/a	Samurai (18:35)	Otani (7:55)	Tajiri (11:44)
Samurai	Samurai (11:32)	Jericho (15:12)	Samurai (14:30)	Samurai (18:35)	—N/a	Samurai (9:00)	Samurai (13:42)
Scorpio	Scorpio (10:07)	Jericho (11:16)	Nakajima (8:05)	Otani (7:55)	Samurai (9:00)	—N/a	Tajiri (9:16)
Tajiri	Tajiri (11:34)	Jericho (13:36)	Nakajima (9:18)	Tajiri (11:44)	Samurai (13:42)	Tajiri (9:16)	—N/a

Final
A1	Koji Kanemoto	Pin
B1	El Samurai	23:51

=== 1998 ===
The 1998 Best of the Super Juniors was a two-block, 12-man tournament held from May 16 to June 3. Like the previous year, it used a simpler points system, including one point for a win and zero for a loss or draw. The winner, Koji Kanemoto, would make an unsuccessful challenge to the champion, Jushin Thunder Liger, on July 15, as well as an equally unsuccessful rematch on January 4, 1999, before beating Liger for the title on March 17, 1999.

Final standings
Block A		Block B	
Dr. Wagner Jr.	4	Koji Kanemoto	4
El Samurai	3	Shiryu	3
Jushin Thunder Liger	3	Kendo Kashin	3
Tatsuhito Takaiwa	2	El Felino	2
Shinjiro Otani	2	Hayato Nanjo	2
Masakazu Fukuda	1	Yuji Yasuraoka	1

Block A	Fukuda	Liger	Otani	Samurai	Takaiwa	Wagner
Fukuda	—N/a	Liger (15:54)	Otani (14:38)	Samurai (13:52)	Fukuda (14:18)	Wagner (13:48)
Liger	Liger (15:54)	—N/a	Liger (20:37)	Samurai (18:19)	Takaiwa (15:03)	Liger (11:27)
Otani	Otani (14:38)	Liger (20:37)	—N/a	Otani (14:55)	Takaiwa (17:46)	Wagner (12:44)
Samurai	Samurai (13:52)	Samurai (18:19)	Otani (14:55)	—N/a	Samurai (14:20)	Wagner (14:16)
Takaiwa	Fukuda (14:18)	Takaiwa (15:03)	Takaiwa (17:46)	Samurai (14:20)	—N/a	Wagner (12:37)
Wagner	Wagner (13:48)	Liger (11:27)	Wagner (12:44)	Wagner (14:16)	Wagner (12:37)	—N/a
Block B	Felino	Kanemoto	Kashin	Nanjo	Shiryu	Yasuraoka
Felino	—N/a	Kanemoto (12:34)	Kashin (6:14)	Felino (10:52)	Shiryu (10:19)	Felino (forfeit)
Kanemoto	Kanemoto (12:34)	—N/a	Kanemoto (15:52)	Kanemoto (7:18)	Kanemoto (16:52)	Yasuraoka (18:07)
Kashin	Kashin (6:14)	Kanemoto (15:52)	—N/a	Kashin (8:58)	Shiryu (10:07)	Kashin (forfeit)
Nanjo	Felino (10:52)	Kanemoto (7:18)	Kashin (8:58)	—N/a	Nanjo (11:22)	Nanjo (forfeit)
Shiryu	Shiryu (10:19)	Kanemoto (16:52)	Shiryu (10:07)	Nanjo (11:22)	—N/a	Shiryu (forfeit)
Yasuraoka	Felino (forfeit)	Yasuraoka (18:07)	Kashin (forfeit)	Nanjo (forfeit)	Shiryu (forfeit)	—N/a

Final
A1	Dr. Wagner Jr.	Pin
B1	Koji Kanemoto	26:17

=== 1999 ===
The 1999 Best of the Super Juniors was a two-block, 12-man tournament held from May 19 to June 8. The winner, Kendo Kashin, went on to defeat the champion Koji Kanemoto for the title on August 28, who he had also defeated in the BOSJ final. Kanemoto became the first person to reach the final three years in a row.

Final standings
Block A		Block B	
Koji Kanemoto	8	Kendo Kashin	8
Gran Hamada	6	Shinjiro Otani	7
Jushin Thunder Liger	6	El Samurai	5
Masaaki Mochizuki	4	Dr. Wagner Jr.	4
Tatsuhito Takaiwa	4	Minoru Tanaka	4
Super Shocker	2	Masao Orihara	2

Block A	Hamada	Kanemoto	Liger	Mochizuki	Shocker	Takaiwa
Hamada	—N/a	Kanemoto (15:46)	Hamada (10:08)	Hamada (10:47)	Hamada (10:17)	Takaiwa (12:32)
Kanemoto	Kanemoto (15:46)	—N/a	Liger (20:29)	Kanemoto (9:40)	Kanemoto (10:19)	Kanemoto (13:29)
Liger	Hamada (10:08)	Liger (20:29)	—N/a	Liger (11:13)	Liger (13:59)	Takaiwa (17:47)
Mochizuki	Hamada (10:47)	Kanemoto (9:40)	Liger (11:13)	—N/a	Mochizuki (10:44)	Mochizuki (13:11)
Shocker	Hamada (10:17)	Kanemoto (10:19)	Liger (13:59)	Mochizuki (10:44)	—N/a	Shocker (13:50)
Takaiwa	Takaiwa (12:32)	Kanemoto (13:29)	Takaiwa (17:47)	Mochizuki (13:11)	Shocker (13:50)	—N/a
Block B	Kashin	Orihara	Otani	Samurai	Tanaka	Wagner
Kashin	—N/a	Kashin (7:06)	Otani (9:34)	Kashin (10:00)	Kashin (10:21)	Kashin (8:58)
Orihara	Kashin (7:06)	—N/a	Otani (9:37)	Samurai (12:52)	Orihara (10:52)	Wagner (10:08)
Otani	Otani (9:34)	Otani (9:37)	—N/a	Draw (30:00)	Tanaka (13:57)	Otani (11:19)
Samurai	Kashin (10:00)	Samurai (12:52)	Draw (30:00)	—N/a	Tanaka (10:32)	Samurai (11:42)
Tanaka	Kashin (10:21)	Orihara (10:52)	Tanaka (13:57)	Tanaka (10:32)	—N/a	Wagner (10:09)
Wagner	Kashin (8:58)	Wagner (10:08)	Otani (11:19)	Samurai (11:42)	Wagner (10:09)	—N/a

Final
A1	Koji Kanemoto	Sub
B1	Kendo Kashin	13:15

=== 2000 ===
The 2000 Best of the Super Juniors was a two-block, 12-man tournament held from May 19 to June 9. The winner, Tatsuhito Takaiwa, would go on to defeat Jushin Thunder Liger for the title on July 20, 2000, ending Liger's last reign with the championship.

Final standings
Block A		Block B	
Tatsuhito Takaiwa	8	Shinjiro Otani	10
Gran Hamada	6	Minoru Tanaka	6
Koji Kanemoto	6	Kendo Kashin	6
El Samurai	4	Katsumi Usuda	4
Dr. Wagner Jr.	4	Kid Romeo	2
Shinya Makabe	2	Minoru Fujita	2

Block A	Hamada	Kanemoto	Makabe	Samurai	Takaiwa	Wagner
Hamada	—N/a	Hamada (13:00)	Hamada (8:37)	Hamada (8:16)	Takaiwa (6:39)	Wagner (10:24)
Kanemoto	Hamada (13:00)	—N/a	Kanemoto (10:37)	Kanemoto (8:14)	Kanemoto (14:04)	Wagner (10:30)
Makabe	Hamada (8:37)	Kanemoto (10:37)	—N/a	Samurai (9:52)	Takaiwa (11:11)	Makabe (12:38)
Samurai	Hamada (8:16)	Kanemoto (8:14)	Samurai (9:52)	—N/a	Takaiwa (9:34)	Samurai (13:51)
Takaiwa	Takaiwa (6:39)	Kanemoto (14:04)	Takaiwa (11:11)	Takaiwa (9:34)	—N/a	Takaiwa (13:06)
Wagner	Wagner (10:24)	Wagner (10:30)	Makabe (12:38)	Samurai (13:51)	Takaiwa (13:06)	—N/a
Block B	Fujita	Kashin	Romeo	Otani	Tanaka	Usuda
Fujita	—N/a	Kashin (5:56)	Romeo (6:06)	Otani (9:16)	Tanaka (11:20)	Fujita (10:08)
Kashin	Kashin (5:56)	—N/a	Kashin (4:51)	Otani (9:59)	Tanaka (9:10)	Kashin (8:30)
Romeo	Romeo (6:06)	Kashin (4:51)	—N/a	Otani (5:37)	Tanaka (5:15)	Usuda (6:16)
Otani	Otani (9:16)	Otani (9:59)	Otani (5:37)	—N/a	Otani (12:14)	Otani (12:55)
Tanaka	Tanaka (11:20)	Tanaka (9:10)	Tanaka (5:15)	Otani (12:14)	—N/a	Usuda (11:56)
Usuda	Fujita (10:08)	Kashin (8:30)	Usuda (6:16)	Otani (12:55)	Usuda (11:56)	—N/a

Final
A1	Tatsuhito Takaiwa	Pin
B1	Shinjiro Otani	18:35

=== 2001 ===
The 2001 Best of the Super Juniors was a two-block, 12-man tournament held from May 18 to June 4. With his victory, Jushin Thunder Liger became both the first person to win the tournament three times and the first to not lose a single match during the tournament. For unclear reasons, Liger did not receive a championship match as a reward for his victory (possibly due to his concentration on heavyweight exploits, like that year's G1 Climax and G1 Tag League).

Final standings
Block A		Block B	
Jushin Thunder Liger	10	Minoru Tanaka	8
El Samurai	6	Akira	6
Silver King	6	Super Shocker	6
Chris Candido	4	Dr. Wagner Jr.	6
Gran Naniwa	4	Shinya Makabe	4
Wataru Inoue	0	Katsuyori Shibata	0

Block A	Candido	Inoue	Liger	Naniwa	Samurai	King
Candido	—N/a	Candido (5:10)	Liger (5:48)	Candido (8:01)	Samurai (4:53)	King (7:40)
Inoue	Candido (5:10)	—N/a	Liger (13:56)	Naniwa (10:48)	Samurai (14:29)	King (8:26)
Liger	Liger (5:48)	Liger (13:56)	—N/a	Liger (14:05)	Liger (13:26)	Liger (12:32)
Naniwa	Candido (8:01)	Naniwa (10:48)	Liger (14:05)	—N/a	Naniwa (11:29)	King (10:01)
Samurai	Samurai (4:53)	Samurai (14:29)	Liger (13:26)	Naniwa (11:29)	—N/a	Samurai (10:33)
King	King (7:40)	King (8:26)	Liger (12:32)	King (10:01)	Samurai (10:33)	—N/a
Block B	Akira	Makabe	Shibata	Shocker	Tanaka	Wagner
Akira	—N/a	Makabe (10:15)	Akira (6:18)	Akira (10:10)	Akira (23:22)	Wagner (11:38)
Makabe	Makabe (10:15)	—N/a	Makabe (6:23)	Shocker (9:41)	Tanaka (16:34)	Wagner (9:03)
Shibata	Akira (6:18)	Makabe (6:23)	—N/a	Shocker (9:07)	Tanaka (6:24)	Wagner (9:28)
Shocker	Akira (10:10)	Shocker (9:41)	Shocker (9:07)	—N/a	Tanaka (12:53)	Shocker (14:23)
Tanaka	Akira (23:22)	Tanaka (16:34)	Tanaka (6:24)	Tanaka (12:53)	—N/a	Tanaka (14:45)
Wagner	Wagner (11:38)	Wagner (9:03)	Wagner (9:28)	Shocker (14:23)	Tanaka (14:45)	—N/a

Final
A1	Jushin Thunder Liger	Pin
B1	Minoru Tanaka	26:12

=== 2002 ===
The 2002 Best of the Super Juniors was a 14-man, two-block tournament held from May 18 to June 5. It once again used the 1997–98 system of one point for a win, and zero for a loss or draw. The two-time winner, Koji Kanemoto, went on to defeat champion Minoru Tanaka for the title on July 19, the same man he defeated in the final of the tournament. The Black Tiger who wrestled in the 2002 event was not Eddie Guerrero who had previously participated in the tournament under that name, but luchador Silver King, who had taken over the character in the preceding year.

Final standings
Block A		Block B	
Koji Kanemoto	4	Minoru Tanaka	4
Jushin Thunder Liger	4	El Samurai	4
Katsuyori Shibata	3	Gedo	3
Black Tiger III	3	Masayuki Naruse	3
Masahito Kakihara	3	Akira	3
Curry Man	2	Tiger Mask IV	3
Jado	1	Wataru Inoue	2

Block A	B. Tiger	Curry	Jado	Kakihara	Kanemoto	Liger	Shibata
B. Tiger	—N/a	Curry (8:46)	B. Tiger (5:00)	B. Tiger (8:20)	B. Tiger (13:35)	Liger (13:30)	Shibata (8:20)
Curry	Curry (8:46)	—N/a	Jado (10:47)	Kakihara (9:23)	Kanemoto (10:50)	Liger (12:58)	Curry (7:14)
Jado	B. Tiger (5:00)	Jado (10:47)	—N/a	Kakihara (forfeit)	Kanemoto (12:06)	Draw (3:10)	Shibata (forfeit)
Kakihara	B. Tiger (8:20)	Kakihara (9:23)	Kakihara (forfeit)	—N/a	Kakihara (12:28)	Liger (14:06)	Shibata (5:39)
Kanemoto	B. Tiger (13:35)	Kanemoto (10:50)	Kanemoto (12:06)	Kakihara (12:28)	—N/a	Kanemoto (17:17)	Kanemoto (6:12)
Liger	Liger (13:30)	Liger (12:58)	Draw (3:10)	Liger (14:06)	Kanemoto (17:17)	—N/a	Liger (9:45)
Shibata	Shibata (8:20)	Curry (7:14)	Shibata (forfeit)	Shibata (5:39)	Kanemoto (6:12)	Liger (9:45)	—N/a
Block B	Akira	Gedo	Inoue	Naruse	Samurai	Tanaka	T. Mask
Akira	—N/a	Gedo (11:12)	Akira (7:47)	Naruse (9:37)	Samurai (11:48)	Akira (16:13)	Akira (10:36)
Gedo	Gedo (11:12)	—N/a	Inoue (11:19)	Gedo (10:41)	Samurai (13:25)	Gedo (12:51)	T. Mask (14:49)
Inoue	Akira (7:47)	Inoue (11:19)	—N/a	Naruse (10:23)	Inoue (7:21)	Tanaka (8:13)	T. Mask (8:16)
Naruse	Naruse (9:37)	Gedo (10:41)	Naruse (10:23)	—N/a	Samurai (9:19)	Tanaka (12:14)	Naruse (6:54)
Samurai	Samurai (11:48)	Samurai (13:25)	Inoue (7:21)	Samurai (9:19)	—N/a	Tanaka (13:01)	T. Mask (12:08)
Tanaka	Akira (16:13)	Gedo (12:51)	Tanaka (8:13)	Tanaka (12:14)	Tanaka (13:01)	—N/a	Tanaka (10:22)
T. Mask	Akira (10:36)	T. Mask (14:49)	T. Mask (8:16)	Naruse (6:54)	T. Mask (12:08)	Tanaka (10:22)	—N/a

Final
A1	Koji Kanemoto	Pin
B1	Minoru Tanaka	14:12

=== 2003 ===
The 2003 Best of the Super Juniors was a 14-man, two-block tournament held from May 23 to June 11. It introduced the modern system of each block's top two scorers advancing to the semifinals with Masahito Kakihara winning the tournament. Kakihara would unsuccessfully challenge champion Tiger Mask IV on July 6, despite having beaten him in the tournament.

Final standings
Block A		Block B	
Akira	10	Koji Kanemoto	8
Takashi Sugiura	8	Masahito Kakihara	8
Jushin Thunder Liger	8	Tiger Mask IV	8
Minoru Fujita	8	Masayuki Naruse	6
Ebessan	4	Stampede Kid	4
Gedo	4	El Samurai	4
Ryusuke Taguchi	0	Jado	4

Block A	Akira	Ebessan	Fujita	Gedo	Liger	Sugiura	Taguchi
Akira	—N/a	Akira (8:24)	Fujita (12:34)	Akira (11:49)	Akira (16:04)	Akira (12:10)	Akira (8:34)
Ebessan	Akira (8:24)	—N/a	Fujita (8:24)	Ebessan (9:09)	Liger (10:56)	Sugiura (11:52)	Ebessan (7:14)
Fujita	Fujita (12:34)	Fujita (8:24)	—N/a	Fujita (11:41)	Liger (11:27)	Sugiura (11:27)	Fujita (10:26)
Gedo	Akira (11:49)	Ebessan (9:09)	Fujita (11:41)	—N/a	Liger (14:09)	Gedo (12:16)	Gedo (8:39)
Liger	Akira (16:04)	Liger (10:56)	Liger (11:27)	Liger (14:09)	—N/a	Sugiura (12:06)	Liger (6:53)
Sugiura	Akira (12:10)	Sugiura (11:52)	Sugiura (11:27)	Gedo (12:16)	Sugiura (12:06)	—N/a	Sugiura (9:13)
Taguchi	Akira (8:34)	Ebessan (7:14)	Fujita (10:26)	Gedo (8:39)	Liger (6:53)	Sugiura (9:13)	—N/a
Block B	Jado	Kakihara	Kanemoto	Naruse	Samurai	Stampede	Tiger
Jado	—N/a	Kakihara (6:56)	Jado (5:23)	Jado (7:38)	Samurai (12:26)	Stampede (5:13)	Tiger (9:59)
Kakihara	Kakihara (6:56)	—N/a	Kanemoto (11:07)	Naruse (9:15)	Kakihara (8:13)	Kakihara (7:06)	Kakihara (10:31)
Kanemoto	Jado (5:23)	Kanemoto (11:07)	—N/a	Kanemoto (10:56)	Samurai (8:29)	Kanemoto (8:50)	Kanemoto (10:45)
Naruse	Jado (7:38)	Naruse (9:15)	Kanemoto (10:56)	—N/a	Naruse (9:07)	Naruse (9:09)	Tiger (10:05)
Samurai	Samurai (12:26)	Kakihara (8:13)	Samurai (8:29)	Naruse (9:07)	—N/a	Stampede (9:41)	Tiger (12:09)
Stampede	Stampede (5:13)	Kakihara (7:06)	Kanemoto (8:50)	Naruse (9:09)	Stampede (9:41)	—N/a	Tiger (7:38)
Tiger	Tiger (9:59)	Kakihara (10:31)	Kanemoto (10:45)	Tiger (10:05)	Tiger (12:09)	Tiger (7:38)	—N/a

Semifinals
A1	Akira	Sub
B2	Masahito Kakihara	8:28
B1	Koji Kanemoto	Sub
A2	Takashi Sugiura	12:48

Final
B2	Masahito Kakihara	Pin
B1	Koji Kanemoto	15:33

=== 2004 ===
The 2004 Best of the Super Juniors was a 16-man, two-block tournament held from May 22 to June 13. It featured a unique structure from other years: the top scorer from each block would advance to the semifinals, while the second and third-place finishers in each block would start in the quarterfinals. Jushin Thunder Liger, after finishing first in Block A, was forced to withdraw from the tournament due to a spinal injury, leaving American Dragon to go to the semifinals instead. The eventual winner, Tiger Mask IV, would unsuccessfully challenge Heat for the title on July 19, though he would defeat him in a rematch on January 4, 2005.

Final standings
Block A		Block B	
Jushin Thunder Liger (withdrew)	9	Tiger Mask IV	12
American Dragon	9	Último Dragón	11
Masahito Kakihara	9	Heat	10
Koji Kanemoto	7	Masayuki Naruse	10
El Samurai	7	Rocky Romero	7
"Big Boss" Ma-g-ma	7	Garuda	3
Wataru Inoue	4	Katsuhiko Nakajima	2
Ryusuke Taguchi	4	Curry Man	1

Block A	A. Dragon	Inoue	Kakihara	Kanemoto	Liger	Ma-g-ma	Samurai	Taguchi
A. Dragon	—N/a	A. Dragon (12:34)	A. Dragon (9:44)	A. Dragon (11:51)	Liger (13:10)	Ma-g-ma (14:35)	A. Dragon (12:58)	Draw (20:00)
Inoue	A. Dragon (12:34)	—N/a	Kakihara (10:37)	Inoue (11:44)	Liger (5:46)	Ma-g-ma (11:16)	Samurai (10:39)	Inoue (10:19)
Kakihara	A. Dragon (9:44)	Kakihara (10:37)	—N/a	Kakihara (10:55)	Draw (20:00)	Kakihara (10:33)	Samurai (9:50)	Kakihara (7:32)
Kanemoto	A. Dragon (11:51)	Inoue (11:44)	Kakihara (10:55)	—N/a	Kanemoto (16:33)	Draw (20:00)	Kanemoto (13:58)	Kanemoto (8:50)
Liger	Liger (13:10)	Liger (5:46)	Draw (20:00)	Kanemoto (16:33)	—N/a	Liger (7:07)	Liger (14:08)	Taguchi (0:45)
Ma-g-ma	Ma-g-ma (14:35)	Ma-g-ma (11:16)	Kakihara (10:33)	Draw (20:00)	Liger (7:07)	—N/a	Samurai (11:56)	Ma-g-ma (8:48)
Samurai	A. Dragon (12:58)	Samurai (10:39)	Samurai (9:50)	Kanemoto (13:58)	Liger (14:08)	Samurai (11:56)	—N/a	Draw (20:00)
Taguchi	Draw (20:00)	Inoue (10:19)	Kakihara (7:32)	Kanemoto (8:50)	Taguchi (0:45)	Ma-g-ma (8:48)	Draw (20:00)	—N/a
Block B	Curry	Ú. Dragón	Garuda	Heat	Nakajima	Naruse	Romero	Tiger
Curry	—N/a	Ú. Dragón (forfeit)	Draw (20:00)	Heat (11:19)	Nakajima (8:20)	Naruse (forfeit)	Romero (forfeit)	Tiger (forfeit)
Ú. Dragón	Ú. Dragón (forfeit)	—N/a	Ú. Dragón (8:46)	Draw (20:00)	Ú. Dragón (9:07)	Naruse (11:06)	Ú. Dragón (12:10)	Ú. Dragón (12:01)
Garuda	Draw (20:00)	Ú. Dragón (8:46)	—N/a	Heat (5:11)	Garuda (8:41)	Naruse (11:06)	Romero (9:55)	Tiger (10:42)
Heat	Heat (11:19)	Draw (20:00)	Heat (5:11)	—N/a	Heat (11:26)	Heat (15:38)	Draw (20:00)	Tiger (14:08)
Nakajima	Nakajima (8:20)	Ú. Dragón (9:07)	Garuda (8:41)	Heat (11:26)	—N/a	Naruse (1:41)	Romero (8:39)	Tiger (7:11)
Naruse	Naruse (forfeit)	Naruse (11:06)	Naruse (11:06)	Heat (15:38)	Naruse (1:41)	—N/a	Naruse (8:41)	Tiger (3:32)
Romero	Romero (forfeit)	Ú. Dragón (12:10)	Romero (9:55)	Draw (20:00)	Romero (8:39)	Naruse (8:41)	—N/a	Tiger (13:14)
Tiger	Tiger (forfeit)	Ú. Dragón (12:01)	Tiger (10:42)	Tiger (14:08)	Tiger (7:11)	Tiger (3:32)	Tiger (13:14)	—N/a

Quarterfinals
B2	Último Dragón	Pin
A3	Koji Kanemoto	5:30
A2	Masahito Kakihara	Sub
B3	Heat	12:52

Semifinals
A1	American Dragon	Sub
A3	Koji Kanemoto	13:34
B1	Tiger Mask IV	Pin
B3	Heat	15:14

Final
A3	Koji Kanemoto	Pin
B1	Tiger Mask IV	11:26

=== 2005 ===
The 2005 Best of the Super Juniors was a 14-man, two-block tournament held from May 21 to June 19. Tiger Mask IV was the first person to win the tournament in consecutive years until Hiromu Takahashi tied the record in 2020 and 2021. Tiger Mask was also the first wrestler since Jushin Thunder Liger in 1994 to win the tournament as champion. His first defence after the tournament was against outsider Dick Togo, who did not compete in the tournament.

The 2005 edition featured the third wrestler to don the Black Tiger mask, as Rocky Romero had begun working as Black Tiger IV the previous year. After withdrawing from the tournament (presumably doe to injury) before his block match against Tiger Mask, he would return and defeat Tiger Mask for the title on October 8.

Final standings
Block A		Block B	
Minoru	8	Gedo	10
Koji Kanemoto	8	Tiger Mask IV	8
Hirooki Goto	6	Jushin Thunder Liger	8
El Samurai	6	Wataru Inoue	6
Masahito Kakihara	6	Black Tiger IV	4
Stampede Kid	4	Katsushi Takemura	4
Jado	4	Akiya Anzawa	2

Block A	Goto	Jado	Kakihara	Kanemoto	Minoru	Samurai	Stampede
Goto	—N/a	Jado (11:31)	Goto (10:16)	Kanemoto (11:28)	Minoru (11:28)	Goto (10:08)	Goto (7:57)
Jado	Jado (11:31)	—N/a	Kakihara (8:02)	Kanemoto (10:40)	Minoru (12:29)	Jado (14:04)	Stampede (9:59)
Kakihara	Goto (10:16)	Kakihara (8:02)	—N/a	Kanemoto (10:29)	Kakihara (10:04)	Samurai (10:47)	Kakihara (8:30)
Kanemoto	Kanemoto (11:28)	Kanemoto (10:40)	Kanemoto (10:29)	—N/a	Minoru (19:38)	Samurai (12:15)	Kanemoto (9:34)
Minoru	Minoru (11:28)	Minoru (12:29)	Kakihara (10:04)	Minoru (19:38)	—N/a	Minoru (13:04)	Stampede (11:30)
Samurai	Goto (10:08)	Jado (14:04)	Samurai (10:47)	Samurai (12:15)	Minoru (13:04)	—N/a	Samurai (9:31)
Stampede	Goto (7:57)	Stampede (9:59)	Kakihara (8:30)	Kanemoto (9:34)	Stampede (11:30)	Samurai (9:31)	—N/a
Block B	Anzawa	B. Tiger	Gedo	Inoue	Liger	Takemura	T. Mask
Anzawa	—N/a	B. Tiger (6:13)	Gedo (10:21)	Anzawa (forfeit)	Liger (8:36)	Takemura (7:46)	T. Mask (5:34)
B. Tiger	B. Tiger (6:13)	—N/a	Gedo (forfeit)	Inoue (11:01)	Liger (forfeit)	B. Tiger (6:46)	T. Mask (forfeit)
Gedo	Gedo (10:21)	Gedo (forfeit)	—N/a	Inoue (15:13)	Gedo (17:24)	Gedo (11:29)	Gedo (11:25)
Inoue	Anzawa (forfeit)	Inoue (11:01)	Inoue (15:13)	—N/a	Liger (16:50)	Takemura (forfeit)	Inoue (11:53)
Liger	Liger (8:36)	Liger (forfeit)	Gedo (17:24)	Liger (16:50)	—N/a	Liger (12:12)	T. Mask (8:58)
Takemura	Takemura (7:46)	B. Tiger (6:46)	Gedo (11:29)	Takemura (forfeit)	Liger (12:12)	—N/a	T. Mask (6:12)
T. Mask	T. Mask (5:34)	T. Mask (forfeit)	Gedo (11:25)	Inoue (11:53)	T. Mask (8:58)	T. Mask (6:12)	—N/a

Semifinals
A1	Minoru	Pin
B2	Tiger Mask IV	12:03
B1	Gedo	Pin
A2	Koji Kanemoto	10:54

Final
B2	Tiger Mask IV	Pin
B1	Gedo	16:03

=== 2006 ===
The 2006 Best of the Super Juniors was a 14-man, two-block tournament held from May 27 to June 18. The winner, Minoru, went on to defeat Koji Kanemoto for the title in December 2006. This tournament marked the first time that neither block winner made it to the final.

Final standings
Block A		Block B	
Jushin Thunder Liger	10	Wataru Inoue	10
Minoru	8	Tiger Mask IV	8
El Samurai	7	Koji Kanemoto	7
Ryusuke Taguchi	7	Gedo	5
Jado	6	Black Tiger IV	4
Sangre Azteca	2	Hirooki Goto	4
Fuego	2	Gentaro	4

Block A	Azteca	Fuego	Jado	Liger	Minoru	Samurai	Taguchi
Azteca	—N/a	Azteca (10:28)	Jado (7:41)	Liger (12:12)	Minoru (12:26)	Samurai (11:08)	Taguchi (12:50)
Fuego	Azteca (10:28)	—N/a	Jado (11:14)	Liger (7:12)	Fuego (4:40)	Samurai (9:51)	Taguchi (6:06)
Jado	Jado (7:41)	Jado (11:14)	—N/a	Liger (15:19)	Minoru (12:54)	Draw (30:00)	Draw (6:01)
Liger	Liger (12:12)	Liger (7:12)	Liger (15:19)	—N/a	Liger (21:20)	Liger (12:16)	Taguchi (15:30)
Minoru	Minoru (12:26)	Fuego (4:40)	Minoru (12:54)	Liger (21:20)	—N/a	Minoru (13:24)	Minoru (19:18)
Samurai	Samurai (11:08)	Samurai (9:51)	Draw (30:00)	Liger (12:16)	Minoru (13:24)	—N/a	Samurai (12:02)
Taguchi	Taguchi (12:50)	Taguchi (6:06)	Draw (6:01)	Taguchi (15:30)	Minoru (19:18)	Samurai (12:02)	—N/a
Block B	B. Tiger	Gedo	Gentaro	Goto	Inoue	Kanemoto	T. Mask
B. Tiger	—N/a	Gedo (10:59)	B. Tiger (14:21)	B. Tiger (12:04)	Inoue (11:41)	Kanemoto (16:35)	T. Mask (9:36)
Gedo	Gedo (10:59)	—N/a	Gedo (12:32)	Goto (15:21)	Inoue (13:17)	Draw (15:06)	T. Mask (12:59)
Gentaro	B. Tiger (14:21)	Gedo (12:32)	—N/a	Goto (8:27)	Gentaro (14:31)	Kanemoto (12:18)	Gentaro (10:22)
Goto	B. Tiger (12:04)	Goto (15:21)	Goto (8:27)	—N/a	Inoue (9:57)	Kanemoto (9:49)	T. Mask (10:58)
Inoue	Inoue (11:41)	Inoue (13:17)	Gentaro (14:31)	Inoue (9:57)	—N/a	Inoue (16:46)	Inoue (5:57)
Kanemoto	Kanemoto (16:35)	Draw (15:06)	Kanemoto (12:18)	Kanemoto (9:49)	Inoue (16:46)	—N/a	T. Mask (12:58)
T. Mask	T. Mask (9:36)	T. Mask (12:59)	Gentaro (10:22)	T. Mask (10:58)	Inoue (5:57)	T. Mask (12:58)	—N/a

Semifinals
A1	Jushin Thunder Liger	Pin
B2	Tiger Mask IV	10:27
B1	Wataru Inoue	Sub
A2	Minoru	18:42

Final
B2	Tiger Mask IV	Sub
A2	Minoru	22:52

=== 2007 ===
The 2007 Best of the Super Juniors was a 14-man, two-block tournament held from June 1 to June 17. On June 7, it was announced that Prince Devitt would be forced to withdraw from the tournament due to an injury, forfeiting all scheduled matches in the process. Milano Collection A.T. became the first wrestler since Shiro Koshinaka to win the tournament on his first try, but would fail to even challenge for the Junior Heavyweight championship; instead, he graduated to the heavyweight division to compete in that year's G1 Climax. The title match instead went to Ryusuke Taguchi for having defeated champion Minoru during the block stages. Taguchi beat Minoru again to win the championship on July 6.

Final standings
Block A		Block B	
Wataru Inoue	10	Ryusuke Taguchi	10
Milano Collection A.T.	8	Minoru	8
Tiger Mask IV	8	Koji Kanemoto	7
Jushin Thunder Liger	8	Gedo	5
Taichi Ishikari	4	B×B Hulk	4
Yujiro	4	El Samurai	4
Prince Devitt (withdrew)	0	Tetsuya Naito	4

Block A	Inoue	Ishikari	Liger	Milano	Devitt	Tiger	Yujiro
Inoue	—N/a	Inoue (13:33)	Liger (15:47)	Inoue (14:22)	Inoue (forfeit)	Inoue (11:36)	Inoue (10:47)
Ishikari	Inoue (13:33)	—N/a	Liger (12:29)	Milano (11:25)	Ishikari (11:40)	Tiger (8:59)	Ishikari (10:41)
Liger	Liger (15:47)	Liger (12:29)	—N/a	Milano (16:41)	Liger (forfeit)	Tiger (14:08)	Liger (11:19)
Milano	Inoue (14:22)	Milano (11:25)	Milano (16:41)	—N/a	Milano (10:18)	Milano (11:23)	Yujiro (10:35)
Devitt	Inoue (forfeit)	Ishikari (11:40)	Liger (forfeit)	Milano (10:18)	—N/a	Tiger (forfeit)	Yujiro (forfeit)
Tiger	Inoue (11:36)	Tiger (8:59)	Tiger (14:08)	Milano (11:23)	Tiger (forfeit)	—N/a	Tiger (10:34)
Yujiro	Inoue (10:47)	Ishikari (10:41)	Liger (11:19)	Yujiro (10:35)	Yujiro (forfeit)	Tiger (10:34)	—N/a
Block B	Hulk	Gedo	Naito	Kanemoto	Minoru	Samurai	Taguchi
Hulk	—N/a	Hulk (11:03)	Hulk (11:10)	Kanemoto (12:05)	Minoru (11:52)	Samurai (8:53)	Taguchi (12:30)
Gedo	Hulk (11:03)	—N/a	Naito (9:29)	Draw (15:50)	Minoru (13:26)	Gedo (14:13)	Gedo (11:36)
Naito	Hulk (11:10)	Naito (9:29)	—N/a	Kanemoto (10:16)	Minoru (9:01)	Naito (9:27)	Taguchi (9:47)
Kanemoto	Kanemoto (12:05)	Draw (15:50)	Kanemoto (10:16)	—N/a	Kanemoto (16:32)	Samurai (16:19)	Taguchi (12:07)
Minoru	Minoru (11:52)	Minoru (13:26)	Minoru (9:01)	Kanemoto (16:32)	—N/a	Minoru (11:36)	Taguchi (14:15)
Samurai	Samurai (8:53)	Gedo (14:13)	Naito (9:27)	Samurai (16:19)	Minoru (11:36)	—N/a	Taguchi (10:26)
Taguchi	Taguchi (12:30)	Gedo (11:36)	Taguchi (9:47)	Taguchi (12:07)	Taguchi (14:15)	Taguchi (10:26)	—N/a

Semifinals
A1	Wataru Inoue	Sub
B2	Minoru	14:45
B1	Ryusuke Taguchi	Pin
A2	Milano Collection A.T.	12:47

Final
A1	Wataru Inoue	Pin
A2	Milano Collection A.T.	19:37

=== 2008 ===
The 2008 Best of the Super Juniors featured 12 participants in two blocks and was held from May 31 to June 15. Outside entrants include former winner Tatsuhito Takaiwa from Pro Wrestling Zero1 and Jimmy Rave from Total Nonstop Action Wrestling. Prince Devitt was again forced out due to injury following his match with Tiger Mask IV, forfeiting his remaining matches. Immediately after the tournament, winner Wataru Inoue, who also joined Liger and Tiger in winning the tournament as champion, graduated to the heavyweight division, vacating the IWGP Junior Heavyweight Championship in the process.

Final standings
Block A		Block B	
Ryusuke Taguchi	8	Tiger Mask IV	10
Wataru Inoue	8	Koji Kanemoto	6
Minoru	4	Jimmy Rave	6
Jushin Thunder Liger	4	Tetsuya Naito	4
Tatsuhito Takaiwa	4	Akira	4
Yujiro	2	Prince Devitt (withdrew)	0

Block A	Inoue	Liger	Minoru	Taguchi	Takaiwa	Yujiro
Inoue	—N/a	Inoue (17:13)	Inoue (19:14)	Taguchi (17:44)	Inoue (13:24)	Inoue (11:19)
Liger	Inoue (17:13)	—N/a	Minoru (13:32)	Taguchi (14:31)	Liger (14:49)	Liger (9:57)
Minoru	Inoue (19:14)	Minoru (13:32)	—N/a	Taguchi (14:29)	Minoru (11:31)	Yujiro (11:58)
Taguchi	Taguchi (17:44)	Taguchi (14:31)	Taguchi (14:29)	—N/a	Takaiwa (14:39)	Taguchi (13:20)
Takaiwa	Inoue (13:24)	Liger (14:49)	Minoru (11:31)	Takaiwa (14:39)	—N/a	Takaiwa (10:47)
Yujiro	Inoue (11:19)	Liger (9:57)	Yujiro (11:58)	Taguchi (13:20)	Takaiwa (10:47)	—N/a
Block B	Akira	Devitt	Kanemoto	Naito	Rave	Tiger
Akira	—N/a	Akira (forfeit)	Akira (18:14)	Naito (13:56)	Rave (11:25)	Tiger (10:22)
Devitt	Akira (forfeit)	—N/a	Kanemoto (forfeit)	Naito (forfeit)	Rave (forfeit)	Tiger (1:40)
Kanemoto	Akira (18:14)	Kanemoto (forfeit)	—N/a	Kanemoto (10:43)	Kanemoto (13:57)	Tiger (10:16)
Naito	Naito (13:56)	Naito (forfeit)	Kanemoto (10:43)	—N/a	Rave (8:01)	Tiger (11:10)
Rave	Rave (11:25)	Rave (forfeit)	Kanemoto (13:57)	Rave (8:01)	—N/a	Tiger (14:03)
Tiger	Tiger (10:22)	Tiger (1:40)	Tiger (10:16)	Tiger (11:10)	Tiger (14:03)	—N/a

Semifinals
A1	Ryusuke Taguchi	Sub
B2	Koji Kanemoto	9:22
B1	Tiger Mask IV	Pin
A2	Wataru Inoue	9:03

Final
B2	Koji Kanemoto	Sub
A2	Wataru Inoue	27:50

=== 2009 ===
The 2009 Best of the Super Juniors featured 14 participants in two blocks and was held from May 30 to June 14. With his victory Koji Kanemoto became only the second wrestler to win the tournament three times in total. He lost a title match on July 20 against the defending champion Tiger Mask IV.

Final standings
Block A		Block B	
Prince Devitt	8	Koji Kanemoto	8
Atsushi Aoki	8	Kota Ibushi	8
Akira	6	Jushin Thunder Liger	6
Jado	6	Ryusuke Taguchi	6
Milano Collection A.T.	6	Tsuyoshi Kikuchi	6
Tiger Mask IV	6	Taichi	4
Black Tiger V	2	Yamato	4

Block A	Akira	Aoki	B. Tiger	Jado	Milano	Devitt	T. Mask
Akira	—N/a	Aoki (15:00)	Akira (12:52)	Jado (14:58)	Akira (11:17)	Devitt (9:53)	Akira (10:05)
Aoki	Aoki (15:00)	—N/a	Aoki (9:36)	Aoki (10:00)	Aoki (11:12)	Devitt (11:16)	T. Mask (10:27)
B. Tiger	Akira (12:52)	Aoki (9:36)	—N/a	Jado (11:26)	Milano (10:29)	Devitt (7:20)	B. Tiger (3:51)
Jado	Jado (14:58)	Aoki (10:00)	Jado (11:26)	—N/a	Milano (16:22)	Devitt (12:54)	Jado (10:48)
Milanno	Akira (11:17)	Aoki (11:12)	Milano (10:29)	Milano (16:22)	—N/a	Milano (15:22)	T. Mask (16:12)
Devitt	Devitt (9:53)	Devitt (11:16)	Devitt (7:20)	Devitt (12:54)	Milano (15:22)	—N/a	T. Mask (11:19)
T. Mask	Akira (10:05)	T. Mask (10:27)	B. Tiger (3:51)	Jado (10:48)	T. Mask (16:12)	T.Mask (11:19)	—N/a
Block B	Liger	Kanemoto	Ibushi	Taguchi	Taichi	Kikuchi	Yamato
Liger	—N/a	Kanemoto (17:27)	Ibushi (16:35)	Liger (10:08)	Liger (11:11)	Liger (8:30)	Yamato (3:38)
Kanemoto	Kanemoto (17:27)	—N/a	Kanemoto (14:18)	Kanemoto (17:11)	Kanemoto (12:05)	Kikuchi (9:18)	Yamato (9:40)
Ibushi	Ibushi (16:35)	Kanemoto (14:18)	—N/a	Taguchi (10:13)	Ibushi (11:59)	Ibushi (9:56)	Ibushi (10:13)
Taguchi	Liger (10:08)	Kanemoto (17:11)	Taguchi (10:13)	—N/a	Taichi (10:01)	Taguchi (11:31)	Taguchi (13:17)
Taichi	Liger (11:11)	Kanemoto (12:05)	Ibushi (11:59)	Taichi (10:01)	—N/a	Kikuchi (9:24)	Taichi (9:31)
Kikuchi	Liger (8:30)	Kikuchi (9:18)	Ibushi (9:56)	Taguchi (11:31)	Kikuchi (9:24)	—N/a	Kikuchi (10:54)
Yamato	Yamato (3:38)	Yamato (9:40)	Ibushi (10:13)	Taguchi (13:17)	Taichi (9:31)	Kikuchi (10:54)	—N/a

Semifinals
A1	Prince Devitt	Pin
B2	Kota Ibushi	8:14
B1	Koji Kanemoto	Stop
A2	Atsushi Aoki	6:27

Final
A1	Prince Devitt	Sub
B1	Koji Kanemoto	19:55

=== 2010 ===
The 2010 Best of the Super Juniors tournament featured 16 participants divided into two blocks, and took place from May 30 to June 13. Outside entrants included Fujita "Jr." Hayato (Michinoku Pro), Kota Ibushi (DDT Pro-Wrestling), Kenny Omega (DDT/Ring of Honor/Pro Wrestling Guerrilla), Kushida (Smash), La Sombra (Consejo Mundial de Lucha Libre), Davey Richards (ROH/PWG), and Taiji Ishimori (Pro Wrestling Noah). On May 31, 2010, it was announced that Tiger Mask IV had injured a vertebra during his match against La Sombra and would be out of action for two months. As a result, Tiger Mask IV withdrew from the competition and forfeited the rest of his matches, which automatically gave all of his opponents two points. On June 6, 2010, Fujita had to forfeit his match against Akira due to injury, thereby also forfeiting the rest of the tournament. Prince Devitt won the tournament and went on to defeat Naomichi Marufuji on June 19, 2010, at Dominion 6.19, becoming the new IWGP Junior Heavyweight Champion.

Final standings
Block A		Block B	
Kota Ibushi	12	Taiji Ishimori	10
Prince Devitt	10	Ryusuke Taguchi	10
Davey Richards	10	Akira	8
Jushin Thunder Liger	8	Kenny Omega	8
Kushida	8	Koji Kanemoto	8
La Sombra	6	Fujita "Jr." Hayato (withdrew)	6
Gedo	2	Tama Tonga	4
Tiger Mask IV (withdrew)	0	Nobuo Yoshihashi	2

Block A	Richards	Gedo	Liger	Ibushi	Kushida	Sombra	Devitt	Tiger
Richards	—N/a	Richards (11:13)	Richards (09:14)	Ibushi (11:27)	Richards (11:13)	Richards (12:06)	Devitt (16:26)	Richards (forfeit)
Gedo	Richards (11:13)	—N/a	Liger (11:27)	Ibushi (09:42)	Kushida (10:09)	Sombra (11:25)	Devitt (12:13)	Gedo (forfeit)
Liger	Richards (09:14)	Liger (11:27)	—N/a	Liger (13:35)	Liger (12:44)	Sombra (04:31)	Devitt (10:18)	Liger (forfeit)
Ibushi	Ibushi (11:27)	Ibushi (09:42)	Liger (13:35)	—N/a	Ibushi (12:03)	Ibushi (11:49)	Ibushi (10:59)	Ibushi (forfeit)
Kushida	Richards (11:13)	Kushida (10:09)	Liger (12:44)	Ibushi (12:03)	—N/a	Kushida (08:17)	Kushida (07:15)	Kushida (forfeit)
Sombra	Richards (12:06)	Sombra (11:25)	Sombra (04:31)	Ibushi (11:49)	Kushida (08:17)	—N/a	Devitt (07:29)	La Sombra (10:33)
Devitt	Devitt (16:26)	Devitt (12:13)	Devitt (10:18)	Ibushi (10:59)	Kushida (07:15)	Devitt (07:29)	—N/a	Devitt (forfeit)
Tiger	Richards (forfeit)	Gedo (forfeit)	Liger (forfeit)	Ibushi (forfeit)	Kushida (forfeit)	La Sombra (10:33)	Devitt (forfeit)	—N/a
Block B	Akira	Fujita	Omega	Kanemoto	Yoshihashi	Taguchi	Ishimori	Tonga
Akira	—N/a	Akira (forfeit)	Akira (11:26)	Akira (11:27)	Yoshihashi (12:45)	Taguchi (12:45)	Akira (09:17)	Tonga (10:22)
Fujita	Akira (forfeit)	—N/a	Fujita (12:14)	Kanemoto (15:38)	Fujita (09:00)	Taguchi (forfeit)	Ishimori (forfeit)	Fujita (09:12)
Omega	Akira (11:26)	Fujita (12:14)	—N/a	Omega (11:29)	Omega (14:30)	Omega (14:12)	Ishimori (09:54)	Omega (10:15)
Kanemoto	Akira (11:27)	Kanemoto (15:38)	Omega (11:29)	—N/a	Kanemoto (13:01)	Taguchi (12:57)	Kanemoto (13:13)	Kanemoto (09:21)
Yoshihashi	Yoshihashi (12:45)	Fujita (09:00)	Omega (14:30)	Kanemoto (13:01)	—N/a	Taguchi (10:45)	Ishimori (09:03)	Tonga (06:19)
Taguchi	Taguchi (12:45)	Taguchi (forfeit)	Omega (14:12)	Taguchi (12:57)	Taguchi (10:45)	—N/a	Ishimori (11:40)	Taguchi (07:41)
Ishimori	Akira (09:17)	Ishimori (forfeit)	Ishimori (09:54)	Kanemoto (13:13)	Ishimori (09:03)	Ishimori (11:40)	—N/a	Ishimori (07:55)
Tonga	Tonga (10:22)	Fujita (09:12)	Omega (10:15)	Kanemoto (09:21)	Tonga (06:19)	Taguchi (07:41)	Ishimori (07:55)	—N/a

Semifinals
A1	Kota Ibushi	Pin
B2	Ryusuke Taguchi	10:14
B1	Taiji Ishimori	Pin
A2	Prince Devitt	6:56

Final
A1	Kota Ibushi	Pin
A2	Prince Devitt	14:34

=== 2011 ===
The 2011 Best of the Super Juniors featured 18 participants in two blocks, and was held from May 26 to June 10. This marked the largest number of entrants in the history of the tournament. Outside entrants included Daisuke Sasaki (freelancer), Fujita "Jr." Hayato (Michinoku Pro), Great Sasuke (Michinoku Pro), Kenny Omega (DDT Pro-Wrestling), Kota Ibushi (DDT), Máscara Dorada (Consejo Mundial de Lucha Libre), and TJP (freelancer). Sasaki and Taichi earned their spots in the tournament by winning Road to the Super Jr. 2Days Tournaments on April 8, 2011. Kota Ibushi became the first wrestler not affiliated with New Japan Pro-Wrestling to win the tournament. He went on to defeat Prince Devitt for the IWGP Junior Heavyweight Championship on June 18, 2011.

Final standings
Block A		Block B	
Prince Devitt	14	Kota Ibushi	12
Davey Richards	12	Ryusuke Taguchi	10
Kenny Omega	10	Great Sasuke	10
Koji Kanemoto	8	Kushida	10
Tiger Mask IV	8	Taka Michinoku	8
Fujita "Jr." Hayato	6	Máscara Dorada	8
TJP	6	Jushin Thunder Liger	8
Taichi	4	Gedo	4
Jado	4	Daisuke Sasaki	2

Block A	Richards	Fujita	Jado	Omega	Kanemoto	Devitt	Taichi	Tiger	TJP
Richards	—N/a	Richards (10:03)	Richards (13:01)	Richards (9:55)	Richards (12:06)	Richards (13:18)	Richards (10:06)	Tiger (9:56)	TJP (9:51)
Fujita	Richards (10:03)	—N/a	Jado (7:11)	Omega (10:43)	Fujita (10:18)	Devitt (8:09)	Fujita (8:34)	Tiger (9:00)	Fujita (7:44)
Jado	Richards (13:01)	Jado (7:11)	—N/a	Jado (9:42)	Kanemoto (9:15)	Devitt (12:14)	Taichi (10:04)	Tiger (8:27)	TJP (12:07)
Omega	Richards (9:55)	Omega (10:43)	Jado (9:42)	—N/a	Omega (11:43)	Devitt (12:08)	Omega (8:59)	Omega (9:05)	Omega (8:20)
Kanemoto	Richards (12:06)	Fujita (10:18)	Kanemoto (9:15)	Omega (11:43)	—N/a	Devitt (7:22)	Kanemoto (10:37)	Kanemoto (9:59)	Kanemoto (8:11)
Devitt	Richards (13:18)	Devitt (8:09)	Devitt (12:14)	Devitt (12:08)	Devitt (7:22)	—N/a	Devitt (9:45)	Devitt (6:54)	Devitt (8:51)
Taichi	Richards (10:06)	Fujita (8:34)	Taichi (10:04)	Omega (8:59)	Kanemoto (10:37)	Devitt (9:45)	—N/a	Taichi (7:04)	TJP (8:29)
Tiger	Tiger (9:56)	Tiger (9:00)	Tiger (8:27)	Omega (9:05)	Kanemoto (9:59)	Devitt (6:54)	Taichi (7:04)	—N/a	Tiger (8:06)
TJP	TJP (9:51)	Fujita (7:44)	TJP (12:07)	Omega (8:20)	Kanemoto (8:11)	Devitt (8:51)	TJP (8:29)	Tiger (8:06)	—N/a
Block B	Sasaki	Gedo	Sasuke	Liger	Ibushi	Kushida	Dorada	Taguchi	Taka
Sasaki	—N/a	Sasaki (11:10)	Sasuke (4:05)	Liger (8:06)	Ibushi (10:39)	Kushida (6:53)	Dorada (8:02)	Taguchi (7:18)	Taka (7:19)
Gedo	Sasaki (11:10)	—N/a	Gedo (9:09)	Liger (7:27)	Ibushi (10:10)	Kushida (8:02)	Dorada (7:37)	Gedo (11:29)	Taka (10:01)
Sasuke	Sasuke (4:05)	Gedo (9:09)	—N/a	Sasuke (17:35)	Ibushi (11:46)	Sasuke (2:47)	Sasuke (4:28)	Taguchi (15:39)	Sasuke (9:57)
Liger	Liger (8:06)	Liger (7:27)	Sasuke (17:35)	—N/a	Ibushi (8:47)	Liger (10:45)	Dorada (3:18)	Liger (9:20)	Taka (8:57)
Ibushi	Ibushi (10:39)	Ibushi (10:10)	Ibushi (11:46)	Ibushi (8:47)	—N/a	Kushida (12:46)	Ibushi (7:28)	Taguchi (13:21)	Ibushi (9:40)
Kushida	Kushida (6:53)	Kushida (8:02)	Sasuke (2:47)	Liger (10:45)	Kushida (12:46)	—N/a	Kushida (6:25)	Taguchi (10:14)	Kushida (9:29)
Dorada	Dorada (8:02)	Dorada (7:37)	Sasuke (4:28)	Dorada (3:18)	Ibushi (7:28)	Kushida (6:25)	—N/a	Dorada (7:02)	Taka (9:45)
Taguchi	Taguchi (7:18)	Gedo (11:29)	Taguchi (15:39)	Liger (9:20)	Taguchi (13:21)	Taguchi (10:14)	Dorada (7:02)	—N/a	Taguchi (9:26)
Taka	Taka (7:19)	Taka (10:01)	Sasuke (9:57)	Taka (8:57)	Ibushi (9:40)	Kushida (9:29)	Taka (9:45)	Taguchi (9:26)	—N/a

Semifinals
A1	Prince Devitt	Pin
B2	Ryusuke Taguchi	8:29
B1	Kota Ibushi	Pin
A2	Davey Richards	11:17

Final
B2	Ryusuke Taguchi	Pin
B1	Kota Ibushi	20:22

=== 2012 ===
The 2012 Best of the Super Juniors featured 18 participants and took place from May 27 to June 10. Outside entrants included Alex Koslov (American independents), Ángel de Oro (Consejo Mundial de Lucha Libre), Brian Kendrick (American independents), Daisuke Sasaki (freelancer), and Pac (Dragon Gate). Black Tiger earned his spot in the tournament by winning the Road to the Super Jr. 2Days Tournament on April 15, 2012. On May 9, New Japan announced that Davey Richards had to pull out of the tournament, following his doctor's orders after a car accident. He was replaced by Brian Kendrick. On May 25, New Japan announced that Black Tiger had been pulled from the tournament, two days after the character's performer Nosawa Rongai had been arrested for smuggling marijuana. He was replaced by Hiromu Takahashi. The tagline of the event was "The Door to the Glory". For the fifth year in a row, the previous year's runner-up, this time Ryusuke Taguchi, came back to win the tournament. Taguchi went on to unsuccessfully challenge Low Ki for the IWGP Junior Heavyweight Championship on June 16 at Dominion 6.16.

Final standings
Block A		Block B	
Pac	10	Low Ki	16
Prince Devitt	10	Ryusuke Taguchi	10
Ángel de Oro	8	Brian Kendrick	10
Jushin Thunder Liger	8	Alex Koslov	10
Rocky Romero	8	Tiger Mask IV	8
Taichi	8	Taka Michinoku	8
Kushida	8	Daisuke Sasaki	4
Bushi	6	Jado	4
Gedo	6	Hiromu Takahashi	2

Block A	Oro	Bushi	Gedo	Liger	Kushida	Pac	Devitt	Romero	Taichi
Oro	—N/a	Bushi (9:50)	Oro (8:15)	Oro (8:21)	Kushida (8:22)	Oro (9:46)	Devitt (8:10)	Romero (10:38)	Oro (9:28)
Bushi	Bushi (9:50)	—N/a	Bushi (8:16)	Liger (7:10)	Kushida (10:51)	Pac (8:35)	Devitt (8:03)	Bushi (5:23)	Taichi (9:33)
Gedo	Oro (8:15)	Bushi (8:16)	—N/a	Gedo (7:43)	Gedo (10:32)	Pac (14:36)	Devitt (11:14)	Romero (8:41)	Gedo (9:49)
Liger	Oro (8:21)	Liger (7:10)	Gedo (7:43)	—N/a	Liger (8:18)	Pac (10:20)	Devitt (12:13)	Liger (7:53)	Liger (7:35)
Kushida	Kushida (8:22)	Kushida (10:51)	Gedo (10:32)	Liger (8:18)	—N/a	Kushida (9:33)	Kushida (12:56)	Romero (12:15)	Taichi (2:33)
Pac	Oro (9:46)	Pac (8:35)	Pac (14:36)	Pac (10:20)	Kushida (9:33)	—N/a	Pac (17:24)	Romero (10:14)	Pac (10:43)
Devitt	Devitt (8:10)	Devitt (8:03)	Devitt (11:14)	Devitt (12:13)	Kushida (12:56)	Pac (17:24)	—N/a	Devitt (11:15)	Taichi (10:59)
Romero	Romero (10:38)	Bushi (5:23)	Romero (8:41)	Liger (7:53)	Romero (12:15)	Romero (10:14)	Devitt (11:15)	—N/a	Taichi (9:58)
Taichi	Oro (9:28)	Taichi (9:33)	Gedo (9:49)	Liger (7:35)	Taichi (2:33)	Pac (10:43)	Taichi (10:59)	Taichi (9:58)	—N/a
Block B	Koslov	Kendrick	Sasaki	Takahashi	Jado	Low Ki	Taguchi	Taka	Tiger
Koslov	—N/a	Kendrick (6:31)	Koslov (10:05)	Koslov (6:43)	Koslov (9:57)	Low Ki (10:14)	Taguchi (14:54)	Koslov (8:22)	Koslov (10:30)
Kendrick	Kendrick (6:31)	—N/a	Kendrick (10:21)	Kendrick (5:50)	Kendrick (8:31)	Low Ki (10:37)	Taguchi (9:59)	Taka (10:51)	Kendrick (6:34)
Sasaki	Koslov (10:05)	Kendrick (10:21)	—N/a	Sasaki (5:02)	Sasaki (8:57)	Low Ki (8:03)	Taguchi (6:55)	Taka (6:22)	Tiger (7:14)
Takahashi	Koslov (6:43)	Kendrick (5:50)	Sasaki (5:02)	—N/a	Jado (5:55)	Low Ki (7:43)	Taguchi (6:12)	Takahashi (3:30)	Tiger (6:50)
Jado	Koslov (9:57)	Kendrick (8:31)	Sasaki (8:57)	Jado (5:55)	—N/a	Low Ki (10:14)	Taguchi (9:43)	Taka (8:31)	Jado (7:26)
Low Ki	Low Ki (10:14)	Low Ki (10:37)	Low Ki (8:03)	Low Ki (7:43)	Low Ki (10:14)	—N/a	Low Ki (14:10)	Low Ki (10:24)	Low Ki (11:14)
Taguchi	Taguchi (14:54)	Taguchi (9:59)	Taguchi (6:55)	Taguchi (6:12)	Taguchi (9:43)	Low Ki (14:10)	—N/a	Taka (11:11)	Tiger (9:41)
Taka	Koslov (8:22)	Taka (10:51)	Taka (6:22)	Takahashi (3:30)	Taka (8:31)	Low Ki (10:24)	Taka (11:11)	—N/a	Tiger (6:40)
Tiger	Koslov (10:30)	Kendrick (6:34)	Tiger (7:14)	Tiger (6:50)	Jado (7:26)	Low Ki (11:14)	Tiger (9:41)	Tiger (6:40)	—N/a

Semifinals
A1	Pac	Pin
B2	Ryusuke Taguchi	10:38
B1	Low Ki	Sub
A2	Prince Devitt	8:50

Final
B2	Ryusuke Taguchi	Pin
B1	Low Ki	17:01

=== 2013 ===
The twentieth Best of the Super Juniors tournament was officially announced on March 28, 2013, and took place over ten shows between May 24 and June 9. The participants were announced on May 3; outside entrants included Beretta (American independents), Brian Kendrick (American independents), Kenny Omega (DDT), Ricochet (Dragon Gate), and Titán (Consejo Mundial de Lucha Libre).

Ryusuke Taguchi, who originally won Block B, was sidelined with a hip injury following June 6 and was replaced in his semifinal match by Taka Michinoku, who had finished third in the block. The winner, Prince Devitt, became only the third wrestler to win all of his matches in the tournament. When Jushin Thunder Liger achieved the feat in 2001, his tournament comprised only six matches, while Devitt's comprised ten. Devitt, having recently turned heel and formed the villainous Bullet Club stable, used this showing of dominance over the division as an excuse to focus on the heavyweight scene, directly parlaying it into a #1 contendership match for the IWGP Heavyweight Championship at Dominion 6.22 (instead of the traditional junior title defence). However, unlike winners who had previously done the same like Wataru Inoue and Milano Collection AT, he maintained his stature as a junior heavyweight and remained the champion. After one final defence in July against Gedo, who did not even qualify to compete in the tournament, he refused to defned the championship again until Kota Ibushi - who was also excluded due to injury - returned and defeated him at Wrestle Kingdom 8.

Previous-year's runner-up Low Ki had been released in January, following his unauthorized decision to wrestle his championship match at Wrestle Kingdom 7 in a cosplay of Agent 47 from Hitman video game series. Thus ending the 5-year streak of BoSJ finalists becoming the following tournament's winner.

Final standings
Block A		Block B	
Prince Devitt	16	Ryusuke Taguchi (withdrew)	10
Alex Shelley	10	Kenny Omega	10
Ricochet	10	Taka Michinoku	8
Taichi	8	Kushida	8
Rocky Romero	8	Alex Koslov	8
Jushin Thunder Liger	8	Brian Kendrick	8
Beretta	6	Tiger Mask IV	8
Titán	6	Bushi	6
Hiromu Takahashi	0	Jado	6

Block A	Shelley	Beretta	Takahashi	Liger	Devitt	Ricochet	Romero	Taichi	Titán
Shelley	—N/a	Shelley (9:38)	Shelley (6:17)	Liger (9:23)	Devitt (12:44)	Shelley (16:33)	Shelley (14:03)	Taichi (8:58)	Shelley (3:36)
Beretta	Shelley (9:38)	—N/a	Beretta (7:14)	Liger (6:46)	Devitt (10:12)	Ricochet (11:56)	Romero (8:00)	Beretta (9:23)	Beretta (7:56)
Takahashi	Shelley (6:17)	Beretta (7:14)	—N/a	Liger (7:49)	Devitt (6:20)	Ricochet (6:39)	Romero (6:10)	Taichi (7:08)	Titán (5:26)
Liger	Liger (9:23)	Liger (6:46)	Liger (7:49)	—N/a	Devitt (6:27)	Ricochet (7:26)	Romero (8:15)	Taichi (7:50)	Liger (8:27)
Devitt	Devitt (12:44)	Devitt (10:12)	Devitt (6:20)	Devitt (6:27)	—N/a	Devitt (13:27)	Devitt (9:39)	Devitt (7:07)	Devitt (5:24)
Ricochet	Shelley (16:33)	Ricochet (11:56)	Ricochet (6:39)	Ricochet (7:26)	Devitt (13:27)	—N/a	Romero (10:58)	Ricochet (7:42)	Ricochet (7:23)
Romero	Shelley (14:03)	Romero (8:00)	Romero (6:10)	Romero (8:15)	Devitt (9:39)	Romero (10:58)	—N/a	Taichi (8:30)	Titán (7:14)
Taichi	Taichi (8:58)	Beretta (9:23)	Taichi (7:08)	Taichi (7:50)	Devitt (7:07)	Ricochet (7:42)	Taichi (8:30)	—N/a	Titán (8:17)
Titán	Shelley (3:36)	Beretta (7:56)	Titán (5:26)	Liger (8:27)	Devitt (5:24)	Ricochet (7:23)	Titán (7:14)	Titán (8:17)	—N/a
Block B	Koslov	Kendrick	Bushi	Jado	Omega	Kushida	Taguchi	Taka	Tiger
Koslov	—N/a	Kendrick (9:47)	Koslov (5:07)	Koslov (8:48)	Omega (9:57)	Kushida (10:45)	Koslov (12:25)	Taka (9:12)	Koslov (8:14)
Kendrick	Kendrick (9:47)	—N/a	Kendrick (5:56)	Kendrick (8:24)	Omega (9:40)	Kushida (9:13)	Kendrick (3:38)	Taka (7:39)	Tiger (6:44)
Bushi	Koslov (5:07)	Kendrick (5:56)	—N/a	Bushi (9:17)	Omega (8:35)	Bushi (9:25)	Taguchi (11:05)	Bushi (5:47)	Tiger (7:19)
Jado	Koslov (8:48)	Kendrick (8:24)	Bushi (9:17)	—N/a	Jado (9:37)	Kushida (10:03)	Jado (10:31)	Jado (7:27)	Tiger (8:01)
Omega	Omega (9:57)	Omega (9:40)	Omega (8:35)	Jado (9:37)	—N/a	Omega (16:10)	Taguchi (13:23)	Omega (10:12)	Tiger (8:14)
Kushida	Kushida (10:45)	Kushida (9:13)	Bushi (9:25)	Kushida (10:03)	Omega (16:10)	—N/a	Taguchi (11:27)	Taka (12:11)	Kushida (9:17)
Taguchi	Koslov (12:25)	Kendrick (3:38)	Taguchi (11:05)	Jado (10:31)	Taguchi (13:23)	Taguchi (11:27)	—N/a	Taguchi (7:31)	Taguchi (7:14)
Taka	Taka (9:12)	Taka (7:39)	Bushi (5:47)	Jado (7:27)	Omega (10:12)	Taka (12:11)	Taguchi (7:31)	—N/a	Taka (4:00)
Tiger	Koslov (8:14)	Tiger (6:44)	Tiger (7:19)	Tiger (8:01)	Tiger (8:14)	Kushida (9:17)	Taguchi (7:14)	Taka (4:00)	—N/a

Semifinals
A1	Prince Devitt	Pin
B2	Kenny Omega	9:09
B3	Taka Michinoku	Pin
A2	Alex Shelley	10:14

Final
A1	Prince Devitt	Pin
A2	Alex Shelley	18:25

=== 2014 ===
The twenty-first Best of the Super Juniors tournament was officially announced on March 14, 2014, and took place between May 30 and June 8. The participants were announced on May 4; outside entrants included Kenny Omega (DDT), Máscara Dorada (Consejo Mundial de Lucha Libre) and Ricochet (Dragon Gate). For the first time in four years, the reigning IWGP Junior Heavyweight Champion did not take part in the tournament as Kota Ibushi was concentrating on chasing the NEVER Openweight Championship. Alex Koslov dislocated his left shoulder in his first match against Ricochet on May 30 and was forced to pull out of the tournament, forfeiting all of his matches. Alex Shelley won block B of the tournament, but was forced to pull out of the semifinals after suffering a shoulder injury in his final round-robin match. As a result, Taichi, who had finished third in the block, advanced to the semifinals. Winner Ricochet received his title match agaisnt Ibushi at Dominion 6.21, and failed to capture the championship. Ibushi would instead lose the title to his following challenger, finalist KUSHIDA.

Final standings
Block A		Block B	
Kushida	10	Alex Shelley (withdrew)	8
Ricochet	10	Ryusuke Taguchi	8
Taka Michinoku	8	Taichi	8
Matt Jackson	8	Nick Jackson	8
Bushi	8	Tiger Mask IV	6
Máscara Dorada	6	El Desperado	6
Jushin Thunder Liger	6	Rocky Romero	6
Alex Koslov (withdrew)	0	Kenny Omega	6

Block A	Koslov	Bushi	Liger	Kushida	Dorada	M. Jackson	Ricochet	Taka
Koslov	—N/a	Bushi (forfeit)	Liger (forfeit)	Kushida (forfeit)	Dorada (forfeit)	M. Jackson (forfeit)	Ricochet (14:29)	Taka (forfeit)
Bushi	Bushi (forfeit)	—N/a	Bushi (8:51)	Bushi (9:58)	Bushi (5:32)	M. Jackson (8:51)	Ricochet (7:31)	Taka (7:55)
Liger	Liger (forfeit)	Bushi (8:51)	—N/a	Kushida (14:15)	Dorada (7:06)	M. Jackson (6:52)	Liger (10:39)	Liger (10:54)
Kushida	Kushida (forfeit)	Bushi (9:58)	Kushida (14:15)	—N/a	Dorada (7:57)	Kushida (11:44)	Kushida (12:10)	Kushida (10:29)
Dorada	Dorada (forfeit)	Bushi (5:32)	Dorada (7:06)	Dorada (7:57)	—N/a	M. Jackson (8:04)	Ricochet (8:59)	Taka (5:31)
M. Jackson	M. Jackson (forfeit)	M. Jackson (8:51)	M. Jackson (6:52)	Kushida (11:44)	M. Jackson (8:04)	—N/a	Ricochet (11:09)	Taka (5:25)
Ricochet	Ricochet (14:29)	Ricochet (7:31)	Liger (10:39)	Kushida (12:10)	Ricochet (8:59)	Ricochet (11:09)	—N/a	Ricochet (8:51)
Taka	Taka (forfeit)	Taka (7:55)	Liger (10:54)	Kushida (10:29)	Taka (5:31)	Taka (5:25)	Ricochet (8:51)	—N/a
Block B	Shelley	Desperado	Omega	N. Jackson	Romero	Taguchi	Taichi	Tiger
Shelley	—N/a	Desperado (9:57)	Omega (11:30)	Shelley (10:38)	Romero (11:03)	Shelley (14:09)	Shelley (4:28)	Shelley (3:13)
Desperado	Desperado (9:57)	—N/a	Desperado (14:12)	N. Jackson (9:07)	Desperado (9:30)	Taguchi (10:43)	Taichi (5:33)	Tiger (8:33)
Omega	Omega (11:30)	Desperado (14:12)	—N/a	N. Jackson (9:09)	Romero (11:36)	Omega (16:19)	Taichi (8:22)	Omega (10:50)
N. Jackson	Shelley (10:38)	N. Jackson (9:07)	N. Jackson (9:09)	—N/a	N. Jackson (8:17)	Taguchi (9:01)	Taichi (6:17)	N. Jackson (8:07)
Romero	Romero (11:03)	Desperado (9:30)	Romero (11:36)	N. Jackson (8:17)	—N/a	Taguchi (11:42)	Romero (7:14)	Tiger (8:45)
Taguchi	Shelley (14:09)	Taguchi (10:43)	Omega (16:19)	Taguchi (9:01)	Taguchi (11:42)	—N/a	Taguchi (9:32)	Tiger (11:29)
Taichi	Shelley (4:28)	Taichi (5:33)	Taichi (8:22)	Taichi (6:17)	Romero (7:14)	Taguchi (9:32)	—N/a	Taichi (6:36)
Tiger	Shelley (3:13)	Tiger (8:33)	Omega (10:50)	N. Jackson (8:07)	Tiger (8:45)	Tiger (11:29)	Taichi (6:36)	—N/a

Semifinals
A1	Kushida	Sub
B3	Taichi	7:29
B2	Ryusuke Taguchi	Pin
A2	Ricochet	5:49

Final
A1	Kushida	Pin
A2	Ricochet	23:06

=== 2015 ===
The twenty-second Best of the Super Juniors tournament was officially announced on March 4, 2015, and took place between May 22 and June 7. The participants were announced on May 7; outside entrants included Bárbaro Cavernario (Consejo Mundial de Lucha Libre), Bobby Fish (Ring of Honor), Chase Owens (National Wrestling Alliance), Kyle O'Reilly (ROH) and the debuting David Finlay Jr., the son of Dave Finlay. For the second year in a row, the reigning IWGP Junior Heavyweight Champion, Kenny Omega, did not enter the tournament. Instead, the winner of the tournament - 2014 finalist KUSHIDA - would challenge for his title at Dominion 7.5 in Osaka-jo Hall. Where KUSHIDA won. Alex Shelley was forced to pull out of the tournament after his opening match with a foot injury, forcing him to forfeit the rest of his matches.

Final standings
Block A		Block B	
Kyle O'Reilly	12	Kushida	12
Ryusuke Taguchi	10	Bobby Fish	10
Beretta	8	Máscara Dorada	10
Chase Owens	8	Rocky Romero	8
Jushin Thunder Liger	8	Tiger Mask IV	8
Bárbaro Cavernario	6	Nick Jackson	6
Gedo	4	Alex Shelley (withdrew)	2
Yohei Komatsu	0	David Finlay	0

Block A	Cavernario	Beretta	Owens	Gedo	Liger	O'Reilly	Taguchi	Komatsu
Cavernario	—N/a	Beretta (13:46)	Cavernario (7:15)	Cavernario (10:53)	Liger (6:11)	O'Reilly (7:50)	Taguchi (8:43)	Cavernario (8:32)
Beretta	Beretta (13:46)	—N/a	Beretta (10:19)	Beretta (8:07)	Liger (7:55)	O'Reilly (13:04)	Taguchi (10:58)	Beretta (10:20)
Owens	Cavernario (7:15)	Beretta (10:19)	—N/a	Owens (7:57)	Owens (8:07)	O'Reilly (11:54)	Owens (18:27)	Owens (7:42)
Gedo	Cavernario (10:53)	Beretta (8:07)	Owens (7:57)	—N/a	Liger (12:36)	O'Reilly (14:15)	Gedo (14:00)	Gedo (10:01)
Liger	Liger (6:11)	Liger (7:55)	Owens (8:07)	Liger (12:36)	—N/a	O'Reilly (8:52)	Taguchi (8:34)	Liger (8:36)
O'Reilly	O'Reilly (7:50)	O'Reilly (13:04)	O'Reilly (11:54)	O'Reilly (14:15)	O'Reilly (8:52)	—N/a	Taguchi (13:15)	O'Reilly (10:14)
Taguchi	Taguchi (8:43)	Taguchi (10:58)	Owens (18:27)	Gedo (14:00)	Taguchi (8:34)	Taguchi (13:15)	—N/a	Taguchi (11:33)
Komatsu	Cavernario (8:32)	Beretta (10:20)	Owens (7:42)	Gedo (10:01)	Liger (8:36)	O'Reilly (10:14)	Taguchi (11:33)	—N/a
Block B	Shelley	Fish	Finlay	Kushida	Dorada	Jackson	Romero	Tiger
Shelley	—N/a	Fish (forfeit)	Shelley (5:32)	Kushida (forfeit)	Dorada (forfeit)	Jackson (forfeit)	Romero (forfeit)	Tiger (forfeit)
Fish	Fish (forfeit)	—N/a	Fish (8:18)	Kushida (16:29)	Fish (10:43)	Fish (11:31)	Fish (13:06)	Tiger (9:22)
Finlay	Shelley (5:32)	Fish (8:18)	—N/a	Kushida (9:40)	Dorada (7:46)	Jackson (9:39)	Romero (10:50)	Tiger (7:21)
Kushida	Kushida (forfeit)	Kushida (16:29)	Kushida (9:40)	—N/a	Kushida (8:53)	Jackson (9:08)	Kushida (15:53)	Kushida (11:44)
Dorada	Dorada (forfeit)	Fish (10:43)	Dorada (7:46)	Kushida (8:53)	—N/a	Dorada (9:44)	Dorada (10:19)	Dorada (10:05)
Jackson	Jackson (forfeit)	Fish (11:31)	Jackson (9:39)	Jackson (9:08)	Dorada (9:44)	—N/a	Romero (13:05)	Tiger (8:03)
Romero	Romero (forfeit)	Fish (13:06)	Romero (10:50)	Kushida (15:53)	Dorada (10:19)	Romero (13:05)	—N/a	Romero (11:01)
Tiger	Tiger (forfeit)	Tiger (9:22)	Tiger (7:21)	Kushida (11:44)	Dorada (10:05)	Tiger (8:03)	Romero (11:01)	—N/a

Final
A1	Kyle O'Reilly	Sub
B1	Kushida	30:45

=== 2016 ===
The twenty-third Best of the Super Juniors tournament took place between May 21 and June 7, 2016. The participants were announced on May 3. Outside entrants included Volador Jr. (Consejo Mundial de Lucha Libre), Bobby Fish, Kyle O'Reilly, Matt Sydal, Barreta (Ring of Honor), Chase Owens (National Wrestling Alliance), Will Ospreay (Revolution Pro Wrestling) and Ricochet (Dragon Gate, Pro Wrestling Guerrilla). Matt Jackson and Nick Jackson were originally announced for the tournament, but both were forced to pull out with injuries before the opening day. On May 19, Matt was replaced with David Finlay Jr. and Nick with Chase Owens. With his win, Will Ospreay, the first English winner of the tournament, also became the youngest Best of the Super Juniors winner in history. Ospreay went on to unsuccessfully challenge Kushida for the IWGP Junior Heavyweight Championship on June 19 at Dominion 6.19 in Osaka-jo Hall. The tournament became known for a controversial match between Ospreay and Ricochet on May 27, which received widespread attention in the professional wrestling world with some, like William Regal, praising the two and others, like Vader, comparing the match to a "gymnastics routine".

Final standings
Block A		Block B	
Ryusuke Taguchi	10	Will Ospreay	8
Matt Sydal	10	Bobby Fish	8
Bushi	8	Ricochet	8
Kyle O'Reilly	8	Volador Jr.	8
Rocky Romero	8	Jushin Thunder Liger	6
Kushida	8	Tiger Mask IV	6
David Finlay	2	Chase Owens	6
Gedo	2	Beretta	6

Block A	Bushi	Finlay	Gedo	Kushida	O'Reilly	Sydal	Romero	Taguchi
Bushi	—N/a	Bushi (7:18)	Gedo (11:34)	Bushi (13:17)	O'Reilly (10:58)	Sydal (9:20)	Bushi (11:08)	Bushi (10:19)
Finlay	Bushi (7:18)	—N/a	Finlay (10:40)	Kushida (10:31)	O'Reilly (9:58)	Sydal (8:59)	Romero (11:00)	Taguchi (9:18)
Gedo	Gedo (11:34)	Finlay (10:40)	—N/a	Kushida (13:34)	O'Reilly (11:24)	Sydal (6:21)	Romero (8:33)	Taguchi (9:46)
Kushida	Bushi (13:17)	Kushida (10:31)	Kushida (13:34)	—N/a	O'Reilly (20:06)	Kushida (15:59)	Romero (15:03)	Kushida (16:09)
O'Reilly	O'Reilly (10:58)	O'Reilly (9:58)	O'Reilly (11:24)	O'Reilly (20:06)	—N/a	Sydal (14:11)	Romero (16:50)	Taguchi (11:46)
Sydal	Sydal (9:20)	Sydal (8:59)	Sydal (6:21)	Kushida (15:59)	Sydal (14:11)	—N/a	Sydal (13:37)	Taguchi (10:20)
Romero	Bushi (11:08)	Romero (11:00)	Romero (8:33)	Romero (15:03)	Romero (16:50)	Sydal (13:37)	—N/a	Taguchi (12:02)
Taguchi	Bushi (10:19)	Taguchi (9:18)	Taguchi (9:46)	Kushida (16:09)	Taguchi (11:46)	Taguchi (10:20)	Taguchi (12:02)	—N/a
Block B	Beretta	Fish	Owens	Liger	Ricochet	Tiger	Volador	Ospreay
Beretta	—N/a	Fish (11:01)	Owens (9:53)	Beretta (5:18)	Ricochet (13:13)	Tiger (12:17)	Beretta (12:04)	Beretta (11:55)
Fish	Fish (11:01)	—N/a	Fish (10:36)	Liger (11:30)	Ricochet (12:30)	Fish (6:42)	Fish (8:48)	Ospreay (14:22)
Owens	Owens (9:53)	Fish (10:36)	—N/a	Liger (7:12)	Owens (10:21)	Tiger (6:46)	Volador (10:28)	Owens (9:58)
Liger	Beretta (5:18)	Liger (11:30)	Liger (7:12)	—N/a	Ricochet (11:30)	Liger (1:11)	Volador (9:02)	Ospreay (8:20)
Ricochet	Ricochet (13:13)	Ricochet (12:30)	Owens (10:21)	Ricochet (11:30)	—N/a	Ricochet (9:53)	Volador (12:03)	Ospreay (16:47)
Tiger	Tiger (12:17)	Fish (6:42)	Tiger (6:46)	Liger (1:11)	Ricochet (9:53)	—N/a	Volador (9:47)	Tiger (7:41)
Volador	Beretta (12:04)	Fish (8:48)	Volador (10:28)	Volador (9:02)	Volador (12:03)	Volador (9:47)	—N/a	Ospreay (8:58)
Ospreay	Beretta (11:55)	Ospreay (14:22)	Owens (9:58)	Ospreay (8:20)	Ospreay (16:47)	Tiger (7:41)	Ospreay (8:58)	—N/a

Final
A1	Ryusuke Taguchi	Pin
B1	Will Ospreay	22:05

=== 2017 ===
The twenty-fourth Best of the Super Juniors tournament took place between May 17 and June 3, 2017. The participants were revealed on May 3. In addition to NJPW regulars, the tournament also featured Consejo Mundial de Lucha Libre (CMLL) wrestlers Dragon Lee and Volador Jr., Ring of Honor (ROH) wrestler Marty Scurll and independent wrestler ACH Veteran wrestler Jushin Thunder Liger, who took part in his 17th Best of the Super Juniors tournament in a row, stated that the 2017 tournament would be his last.

KUSHIDA won his second BoSJ tournament, and went on to defeat reigning champion Hiromu Takahashi at Dominion 6.11 in Osaka-jo Hall, thus avenging his loss of the title to Takahashi at Wrestle Kingdom 11 and embarrassing 2-minute defeat in the rematch at Sakura Genesis 2017.

Final standings
Block A		Block B	
Will Ospreay	10	Kushida	8
Dragon Lee	8	Bushi	8
Ricochet	8	Ryusuke Taguchi	8
Hiromu Takahashi	8	Yoshinobu Kanemaru	8
Taichi	8	Volador Jr.	6
Marty Scurll	8	Tiger Mask IV	6
Taka Michinoku	4	ACH	6
Jushin Thunder Liger	2	El Desperado	6

Block A	Lee	Takahashi	Liger	Scurll	Ricochet	Taichi	Taka	Ospreay
Lee	—N/a	Lee (18:56)	Lee (7:54)	Lee (13:09)	Lee (13:07)	Taichi (9:04)	Taka (9:20)	Ospreay (10:05)
Takahashi	Lee (18:56)	—N/a	Takahashi (8:05)	Takahashi (13:07)	Ricochet (12:15)	Takahashi (14:13)	Takahashi (9:25)	Ospreay (15:19)
Liger	Lee (7:54)	Takahashi (8:05)	—N/a	Scurll (12:16)	Ricochet (9:04)	Liger (10:02)	Taka (8:33)	Ospreay (10:10)
Scurll	Lee (13:09)	Takahashi (13:07)	Scurll (12:16)	—N/a	Scurll (13:31)	Taichi (9:25)	Scurll (8:51)	Scurll (12:11)
Ricochet	Lee (13:07)	Ricochet (12:15)	Ricochet (9:04)	Scurll (13:31)	—N/a	Ricochet (8:56)	Ricochet (7:41)	Ospreay (27:27)
Taichi	Taichi (9:04)	Takahashi (14:13)	Liger (10:02)	Taichi (9:25)	Ricochet (8:56)	—N/a	Taichi (9:30)	Taichi (10:08)
Taka	Taka (9:20)	Takahashi (9:25)	Taka (8:33)	Scurll (8:51)	Ricochet (7:41)	Taichi (9:30)	—N/a	Ospreay (8:46)
Ospreay	Ospreay (10:05)	Ospreay (15:19)	Ospreay (10:10)	Scurll (12:11)	Ospreay (27:27)	Taichi (10:08)	Ospreay (8:46)	—N/a
Block B	ACH	Bushi	Desperado	Kushida	Taguchi	Tiger	Volador	Kanemaru
ACH	—N/a	ACH (10:47)	ACH (9:56)	ACH (14:44)	Taguchi (13:41)	Tiger (11:40)	Volador (12:02)	Kanemaru (10:26)
Bushi	ACH (10:47)	—N/a	Desperado (9:47)	Kushida (15:51)	Bushi (9:25)	Bushi (12:08)	Bushi (10:53)	Bushi (9:27)
Desperado	ACH (9:56)	Desperado (9:47)	—N/a	Desperado (11:43)	Desperado (12:38)	Tiger (10:20)	Volador (8:03)	Kanemaru (9:39)
Kushida	ACH (14:44)	Kushida (15:51)	Desperado (11:43)	—N/a	Kushida (22:53)	Tiger (10:41)	Kushida (15:44)	Kushida (13:16)
Taguchi	Taguchi (13:41)	Bushi (9:25)	Desperado (12:38)	Kushida (22:53)	—N/a	Taguchi (9:29)	Taguchi (9:58)	Taguchi (11:27)
Tiger	Tiger (11:40)	Bushi (12:08)	Tiger (10:20)	Tiger (10:41)	Taguchi (9:29)	—N/a	Volador (9:48)	Kanemaru (8:42)
Volador	Volador (12:02)	Bushi (10:53)	Volador (8:03)	Kushida (15:44)	Taguchi (9:58)	Volador (9:48)	—N/a	Kanemaru (9:41)
Kanemaru	Kanemaru (10:26)	Bushi (9:27)	Kanemaru (9:39)	Kushida (13:16)	Taguchi (11:27)	Kanemaru (8:42)	Kanemaru (9:41)	—N/a

Final
A1	Will Ospreay	Pin
B1	Kushida	27:59

=== 2018 ===
The twenty-fifth Best of the Super Juniors started on May 18 and ended on June 4, 2018. The participants were revealed on May 7. In addition to NJPW regulars, the tournament also features Consejo Mundial de Lucha Libre (CMLL) wrestler Dragon Lee, Ring of Honor (ROH) wrestlers Marty Scurll, Flip Gordon and Chris Sabin, and independent wrestler ACH The final match between Taiji Ishimori and Hiromu Takahashi became the longest match in BOSJ history breaking the previous record from 2015. It was also the first time since 2011 that the final did not feature a gaijin wrestler. The final match was given a 5 1/2 star rating by Dave Meltzer of the Wrestling Observer Newsletter. After winning his first BoSJ, Takahashi defeated Will Ospreay for the championship at Dominion 6.9 in Osaka-jo Hall to begin his second reign. He then successfully defended his title against both men to defeat him in the tournament, only to vacate it shortly after the second at G1 Special in San Francisco due to Dragon Lee's Dragon Driver breaking his neck.

Final standings
Block A		Block B	
Taiji Ishimori	10	Hiromu Takahashi	10
Will Ospreay	10	Kushida	8
Bushi	6	Marty Scurll	8
ACH	6	Chris Sabin	6
Flip Gordon	6	Dragon Lee	6
Tiger Mask IV	6	El Desperado	6
Yoh	6	Ryusuke Taguchi	6
Yoshinobu Kanemaru	6	Sho	6

Block A	ACH	Bushi	Gordon	Ishimori	Tiger	Ospreay	Yoh	Kanemaru
ACH	—N/a	Bushi (11:57)	ACH (15:26)	Ishimori (11:57)	ACH (8:27)	Ospreay (16:50)	ACH (12:04)	Kanemaru (14:04)
Bushi	Bushi (11:57)	—N/a	Bushi (11:58)	Ishimori (12:02)	Tiger (11:16)	Bushi (14:47)	Yoh (15:18)	Kanemaru (9:24)
Gordon	ACH (15:26)	Bushi (11:58)	—N/a	Gordon (9:27)	Gordon (11:15)	Ospreay (19:36)	Yoh (11:06)	Gordon (10:03)
Ishimori	Ishimori (11:57)	Ishimori (12:02)	Gordon (9:27)	—N/a	Ishimori (11:18)	Ishimori (13:47)	Ishimori (14:55)	Kanemaru (14:55)
Tiger	ACH (8:27)	Tiger (11:16)	Gordon (11:15)	Ishimori (11:18)	—N/a	Ospreay (12:05)	Tiger (13:33)	Tiger (10:27)
Ospreay	Ospreay (16:50)	Bushi (14:47)	Ospreay (19:36)	Ishimori (13:47)	Ospreay (12:05)	—N/a	Ospreay (16:28)	Ospreay (14:03)
Yoh	ACH (12:04)	Yoh (15:18)	Yoh (11:06)	Ishimori (14:55)	Tiger (13:33)	Ospreay (16:28)	—N/a	Yoh (16:37)
Kanemaru	Kanemaru (14:04)	Kanemaru (9:24)	Gordon (10:03)	Kanemaru (14:55)	Tiger (10:27)	Ospreay (14:03)	Yoh (16:37)	—N/a
Block B	Sabin	Lee	Desperado	Takahashi	Kushida	Scurll	Taguchi	Sho
Sabin	—N/a	Sabin (13:39)	Sabin (12:14)	Takahashi (13:35)	Sabin (13:47)	Scurll (13:58)	Taguchi (10:56)	Sho (15:09)
Lee	Sabin (13:39)	—N/a	Desperado (12:18)	Lee (20:48)	Kushida (18:17)	Scurll (16:01)	Lee (11:14)	Lee (17:31)
Desperado	Sabin (12:14)	Desperado (12:18)	—N/a	Desperado (22:48)	Kushida (18:33)	Scurll (14:40)	Desperado (13:17)	Sho (12:48)
Takahashi	Takahashi (13:35)	Lee (20:48)	Desperado (22:48)	—N/a	Takahashi (24:15)	Takahashi (20:47)	Takahashi (14:49)	Takahashi (16:19)
Kushida	Sabin (13:47)	Kushida (18:17)	Kushida (18:33)	Takahashi (24:15)	—N/a	Kushida (19:22)	Taguchi (1:34)	Kushida (19:24)
Scurll	Scurll (13:58)	Scurll (16:01)	Scurll (14:40)	Takahashi (20:47)	Kushida (19:22)	—N/a	Scurll (15:42)	Sho (20:39)
Taguchi	Taguchi (10:56)	Lee (11:14)	Desperado (13:17)	Takahashi (14:49)	Taguchi (1:34)	Scurll (15:42)	—N/a	Taguchi (13:08)
Sho	Sho (15:09)	Lee (17:31)	Sho (12:48)	Takahashi (16:19)	Kushida (19:24)	Sho (20:39)	Taguchi (13:08)	—N/a

Final
A1	Taiji Ishimori	Pin
B1	Hiromu Takahashi	34:09

=== 2019 ===
The twenty-sixth Best of the Super Juniors started on May 13, 2019, and ended on June 5, 2019. The final took place at Ryōgoku Kokugikan. The participants were all revealed bar one on April 23. In addition to NJPW regulars, the tournament will also feature Consejo Mundial de Lucha Libre (CMLL) wrestlers Dragon Lee and Titán and Ring of Honor (ROH) wrestlers Marty Scurll, Jonathan Gresham and Bandido. This is the first edition to have twenty wrestlers entering the tournament. Before the tournament, El Desperado had to pull out due to injury and was replaced by Douki. Flip Gordon also had to pull out due to visa issues, being replaced by young lion Ren Narita. Taka Michinoku forfeited his final three matches due to a leg injury.

The 2019 edition included a record twenty participants; Shingo Takagi won all his matches in Block A, therefore becoming the first person to win nine matches within the same block, and setting a new record for most points scored at the tournament with 18 (apart from the inaugural 1988 edition, which used a different points system); the previous record for the current format was held by Prince Devitt, who won all eight of his matches in 2013 and scored 16. Will Ospreay defeated him in the final and went on to defeated reigning champion Dragon Lee for the title at Dominion 6.9 in Osaka-jo Hall. He would eventually lose the championship at Wrestle Kingdom 14 to Hiromu Takahashi, having returned after 16-month recovery period from his neck injury.

Final standings
Block A		Block B	
Shingo Takagi	18	Will Ospreay	14
Taiji Ishimori	14	Ryusuke Taguchi	12
Dragon Lee	14	Bushi	12
Sho	10	Yoh	12
Marty Scurll	10	El Phantasmo	12
Jonathan Gresham	8	Bandido	10
Titán	6	Robbie Eagles	10
Yoshinobu Kanemaru	6	Rocky Romero	6
Tiger Mask IV	4	Douki	2
Taka Michinoku (withdrew)	0	Ren Narita	0

Block A	Lee	Gresham	Scurll	Takagi	Sho	Ishimori	Taka	Tiger	Titán	Kanemaru
Lee	—N/a	Lee (9:42)	Lee (16:12)	Takagi (17:20)	Lee (27:10)	Ishimori (18:32)	Lee (forfeit)	Lee (8:59)	Lee (14:01)	Lee (14:02)
Gresham	Lee (9:42)	—N/a	Scurll (12:22)	Takagi (11:11)	Sho (10:27)	Ishimori (6:50)	Gresham (9:28)	Gresham (9:21)	Gresham (10:55)	Gresham (7:45)
Scurll	Lee (16:12)	Scurll (12:22)	—N/a	Takagi (14:07)	Sho (13:18)	Ishimori (22:21)	Scurll (forfeit)	Scurll (13:01)	Scurll (10:29)	Scurll (5:02)
Takagi	Takagi (17:20)	Takagi (11:11)	Takagi (14:07)	—N/a	Takagi (25:07)	Takagi (20:58)	Takagi (7:23)	Takagi (9:22)	Takagi (10:26)	Takagi (15:24)
Sho	Lee (27:10)	Sho (10:27)	Sho (13:18)	Takagi (25:07)	—N/a	Ishimori (20:27)	Sho (10:02)	Sho (8:14)	Sho (11:05)	Kanemaru (4:01)
Ishimori	Ishimori (18:32)	Ishimori (6:50)	Ishimori (22:21)	Takagi (20:58)	Ishimori (20:27)	—N/a	Ishimori (4:56)	Ishimori (4:34)	Ishimori (11:42)	Kanemaru (3:51)
Taka	Lee (forfeit)	Gresham (9:28)	Scurll (forfeit)	Takagi (7:23)	Sho (10:02)	Ishimori (4:56)	—N/a	Tiger (10:58)	Titán (8:09)	Kanemaru (forfeit)
Tiger	Lee (8:59)	Gresham (9:21)	Scurll (13:01)	Takagi (9:22)	Sho (8:14)	Ishimori (4:34)	Tiger (10:58)	—N/a	Titán (8:10)	Tiger (11:14)
Titán	Lee (14:01)	Gresham (10:55)	Scurll (10:29)	Takagi (10:26)	Sho (11:05)	Ishimori (11:42)	Titán (8:09)	Titán (8:10)	—N/a	Titán (11:01)
Kanemaru	Lee (14:02)	Gresham (7:45)	Scurll (5:02)	Takagi (15:24)	Kanemaru (4:01)	Kanemaru (3:51)	Kanemaru (forfeit)	Tiger (11:14)	Titán (11:01)	—N/a
Block B	Bandido	Bushi	Douki	Phantasmo	Narita	Eagles	Romero	Taguchi	Ospreay	Yoh
Bandido	—N/a	Bushi (8:36)	Bandido (9:55)	Phantasmo (12:12)	Bandido (6:19)	Bandido (9:35)	Bandido (11:30)	Bandido (10:50)	Ospreay (18:03)	Yoh (13:06)
Bushi	Bushi (8:36)	—N/a	Bushi (7:13)	Phantasmo (10:31)	Bushi (9:08)	Bushi (8:04)	Bushi (10:21)	Taguchi (14:56)	Ospreay (16:35)	Bushi (11:46)
Douki	Bandido (9:55)	Bushi (7:13)	—N/a	Phantasmo (13:13)	Douki (10:13)	Eagles (8:11)	Romero (10:16)	Taguchi (21:22)	Ospreay (16:17)	Yoh (11:22)
Phantasmo	Phantasmo (12:12)	Phantasmo (10:31)	Phantasmo (13:13)	—N/a	Phantasmo (6:59)	Phantasmo (10:20)	Romero (28:38)	Taguchi (20:18)	Phantasmo (26:40)	Yoh (12:03)
Narita	Bandido (6:19)	Bushi (9:08)	Douki (10:13)	Phantasmo (6:59)	—N/a	Eagles (9:18)	Romero (12:28)	Taguchi (7:10)	Ospreay (8:45)	Yoh (12:22)
Eagles	Bandido (9:35)	Bushi (8:04)	Eagles (8:11)	Phantasmo (10:20)	Eagles (9:18)	—N/a	Eagles (13:55)	Eagles (11:13)	Eagles (28:01)	Yoh (11:45)
Romero	Bandido (11:30)	Bushi (10:21)	Romero (10:16)	Romero (28:38)	Romero (12:28)	Eagles (13:55)	—N/a	Taguchi (9:58)	Ospreay (25:45)	Yoh (13:29)
Taguchi	Bandido (10:50)	Taguchi (14:56)	Taguchi (21:22)	Taguchi (20:18)	Taguchi (7:10)	Eagles (11:13)	Taguchi (9:58)	—N/a	Ospreay (22:18)	Taguchi (20:38)
Ospreay	Ospreay (18:03)	Ospreay (16:35)	Ospreay (16:17)	Phantasmo (26:40)	Ospreay (8:45)	Eagles (28:01)	Ospreay (25:45)	Ospreay (22:18)	—N/a	Ospreay (24:43)
Yoh	Yoh (13:06)	Bushi (11:46)	Yoh (11:22)	Yoh (12:03)	Yoh (12:22)	Yoh (11:45)	Yoh (13:29)	Taguchi (20:38)	Ospreay (24:43)	—N/a

Final
A1	Shingo Takagi	Pin
B1	Will Ospreay	33:36

=== 2020 ===
The twenty-seventh Best of the Super Juniors was originally scheduled to take place from May 12 to June 6, 2020. It was postponed as a result of the global COVID-19 pandemic, and combined with the World Tag League from November 15 to December 11. On the intermission of the November 2, 2020 Road to Power Struggle show, it was announced that the tournament will be held in a single block format with ten participants. Yoshinobu Kanemaru was scheduled to participate in the tournament, however, he pulled out due to injury and was replaced by young lion Yuya Uemura. The final was held at Nippon Budokan.

Due to the late start, the winner received their title shot at Wrestle Kingdom 15 instead of the traditional June NJPW Dominion event. Hiromu Takahashi won his second BoSJ and defeated Taiji Ishimori for the championship, a day after beating Super J-Cup winner El Phantasmo.

Final standings
Wrestler	Score
El Desperado	14
Hiromu Takahashi	14
Taiji Ishimori	14
Sho	12
Bushi	8
Master Wato	8
Robbie Eagles	8
Ryusuke Taguchi	8
Douki	4
Yuya Uemura	0

Results	Eagles	Sho	Ishimori	Takahashi	Taguchi	Bushi	Desperado	Uemura	Douki	Wato
Eagles	—N/a	Eagles (19:22)	Ishimori (17:22)	Takahashi (26:01)	Eagles (13:03)	Bushi (11:23)	Desperado (14:47)	Eagles (7:30)	Eagles (10:35)	Wato (12:37)
Sho	Eagles (19:22)	—N/a	Ishimori (12:10)	Sho (24:53)	Sho (17:05)	Sho (10:20)	Desperado (18:40)	Sho (15:01)	Sho (16:26)	Sho (12:58)
Ishimori	Ishimori (17:22)	Ishimori (12:10)	—N/a	Takahashi (20:06)	Ishimori (11:33)	Ishimori (15:26)	Desperado (17:18)	Ishimori (10:36)	Ishimori (12:00)	Ishimori (15:34)
Takahashi	Takahashi (26:01)	Sho (24:53)	Takahashi (20:06)	—N/a	Takahashi (25:30)	Takahashi (23:42)	Desperado (23:10)	Takahashi (10:43)	Takahashi (16:33)	Takahashi (10:30)
Taguchi	Eagles (13:03)	Sho (17:05)	Ishimori (11:33)	Takahashi (25:30)	—N/a	Bushi (10:51)	Taguchi (12:35)	Taguchi (11:26)	Taguchi (8:50)	Taguchi (10:22)
Bushi	Bushi (11:23)	Sho (10:20)	Ishimori (15:26)	Takahashi (23:42)	Bushi (10:51)	—N/a	Desperado (12:53)	Bushi (9:57)	Douki (10:59)	Bushi (13:15)
Desperado	Desperado (14:47)	Desperado (18:40)	Desperado (17:18)	Desperado (23:10)	Taguchi (12:35)	Desperado (12:53)	—N/a	Desperado (11:26)	Desperado (15:23)	Wato (14:33)
Uemura	Eagles (7:30)	Sho (15:01)	Ishimori (10:36)	Takahashi (10:43)	Taguchi (11:26)	Bushi (9:57)	Desperado (11:26)	—N/a	Douki (12:54)	Wato (4:14)
Douki	Eagles (10:35)	Sho (12:37)	Ishimori (12:00)	Takahashi (16:33)	Taguchi (8:50)	Douki (10:59)	Desperado (15:23)	Douki (12:54)	—N/a	Wato (12:29)
Wato	Wato (12:37)	Sho (12:58)	Ishimori (15:34)	Takahashi (10:30)	Taguchi (10:22)	Bushi (13:15)	Wato (14:33)	Wato (4:14)	Wato (12:29)	—N/a

Final
1	El Desperado	Pin
2	Hiromu Takahashi	30:14

=== 2021 ===
The twenty-eighth Best of the Super Juniors started on November 13, 2021. The entire field of participants was announced on November 8, 2021. Like last year's tournament, it was held in a single block format, with twelve participants instead of ten. Many of last year's participants returned, along with Yoshinobu Kanemaru, who was originally scheduled to compete last year. The final was held at Ryogoku Kokugikan. Hiromu Takahashi - who had been injured 2 months into his title reign and forced to vacate once again - became the second wrestler to win two consecutive Best of the Super Jrs. tournaments after Tiger Mask IV (who previously won in 2004 and 2005), and the third person to become a three-time tournament winner after Jushin Thunder Liger and Koji Kanemoto. Once again the title match was set for January 4 in the Tokyo Dome, at Wrestle Kingdom 16, where champion El Desperado - who drew with Takahashi in their block match - successfully retained against him.

Final standings
Wrestler	Score
Hiromu Takahashi	15
Yoh	14
El Desperado	13
El Phantasmo	12
Taiji Ishimori	12
Robbie Eagles	12
Sho	12
Bushi	10
Ryusuke Taguchi	10
Master Wato	8
Yoshinobu Kanemaru	8
Douki	6

Results	Eagles	Sho	Yoh	Ishimori	Takahashi	Taguchi	Bushi	Desperado	Kanemaru	Phantasmo	Douki	Wato
Eagles	—N/a	Eagles (14:06)	Yoh (13:48)	Ishimori (13:26)	Takahashi (27:07)	Taguchi (16:17)	Eagles (12:52)	Desperado (18:25)	Eagles (12:23)	Eagles (19:03)	Eagles (11:53)	Eagles (13:30)
Sho	Eagles (14:06)	—N/a	Yoh (15:31)	Ishimori (13:30)	Sho (17:37)	Sho (14:42)	Sho (12:58)	Sho (25:11)	Kanemaru (8:08)	Phantasmo (11:47)	Sho (11:37)	Sho (15:02)
Yoh	Yoh (13:48)	Yoh (15:31)	—N/a	Yoh (13:33)	Takahashi (3:55)	Taguchi (14:36)	Bushi (10:32)	Yoh (18:26)	Yoh (12:11)	Yoh (14:32)	Douki (10:56)	Yoh (14:58)
Ishimori	Ishimori (13:26)	Ishimori (13:30)	Yoh (13:33)	—N/a	Ishimori (25:36)	Taguchi (12:45)	Bushi (13:53)	Ishimori (22:41)	Kanemaru (5:37)	Phantasmo (15:53)	Ishimori (10:23)	Ishimori (11:21)
Takahashi	Takahashi (27:07)	Sho (17:37)	Takahashi (3:55)	Ishimori (25:36)	—N/a	Takahashi (8:56)	Takahashi (21:16)	Draw (30:00)	Takahashi (14:24)	Phantasmo (23:14)	Takahashi (20:34)	Takahashi (16:30)
Taguchi	Taguchi (16:17)	Sho (14:42)	Taguchi (14:36)	Taguchi (12:45)	Takahashi (8:56)	—N/a	Bushi (13:59)	Desperado (18:11)	Taguchi (10:13)	Phantasmo (15:12)	Taguchi (11:39)	Wato (12:09)
Bushi	Eagles (12:52)	Sho (12:58)	Bushi (10:32)	Bushi (13:53)	Takahashi (21:16)	Bushi (13:59)	—N/a	Desperado (21:08)	Bushi (9:10)	Bushi (13:45)	Douki (10:53)	Wato (11:15)
Desperado	Desperado (18:25)	Sho (25:11)	Yoh (18:26)	Ishimori (22:41)	Draw (30:00)	Desperado (18:11)	Desperado (21:08)	—N/a	Desperado (15:10)	Phantasmo (21:11)	Desperado (15:08)	Desperado (20:10)
Kanemaru	Eagles (12:23)	Kanemaru (8:08)	Yoh (12:11)	Kanemaru (5:37)	Takahashi (14:24)	Taguchi (10:13)	Bushi (9:10)	Desperado (15:10)	—N/a	Kanemaru (12:40)	Kanemaru (10:35)	Wato (10:17)
Phantasmo	Eagles (19:03)	Phantasmo (11:47)	Yoh (14:32)	Phantasmo (15:53)	Phantasmo (23:14)	Phantasmo (15:12)	Bushi (13:45)	Phantasmo (21:11)	Kanemaru (12:40)	—N/a	Phantasmo (9:40)	Wato (13:52)
Douki	Eagles (11:53)	Sho (11:37)	Douki (10:56)	Ishimori (10:23)	Takahashi (20:34)	Taguchi (11:39)	Douki (10:53)	Desperado (15:08)	Kanemaru (10:35)	Phantasmo (9:40)	—N/a	Douki (11:50)
Wato	Eagles (13:30)	Sho (15:02)	Yoh (14:58)	Ishimori (11:21)	Takahashi (16:30)	Wato (12:09)	Wato (11:15)	Desperado (20:10)	Wato (10:17)	Wato (13:52)	Douki (11:50)	—N/a

Final
1	Hiromu Takahashi	Pin
2	Yoh	38:30

=== 2022 ===
The twenty-ninth Best of the Super Juniors began on May 15 and finished on June 3 at Nippon Budokan. For the first time in 2 years, the tournament went back to its traditional calendar position of mid-May–early June, ran on its own separate from World Tag League, and returned to a two-block format, featuring wrestlers from NJPW Strong, Consejo Mundial de Lucha Libre (CMLL), Impact Wrestling, Gleat, and All Elite Wrestling (AEW). Hiromu Takahashi became the first-ever wrestler to win three consecutive Best of the Super Jrs. tournaments and also the first to become a four-time tournament winner. He opted to cash in his title shot a week after Dominion 6.12 in Osaka-jo Hall on June 21 instead, and lost to champion Taiji Ishimori. However, he succeeded in Ishimori's next defence at Wrestle Kingdom 17.

Final standings
Block A		Block B	
Hiromu Takahashi	12	El Desperado	12
Taiji Ishimori	12	El Phantasmo	12
Sho	10	Robbie Eagles	10
Ace Austin	10	Wheeler Yuta	10
Yoh	8	Bushi	8
Clark Connors	8	Titán	8
Alex Zayne	8	TJP	8
Francesco Akira	8	El Lindaman	8
Yoshinobu Kanemaru	8	Master Wato	8
Ryusuke Taguchi	6	Douki	6

Block A	Austin	Zayne	Connors	Akira	Takahashi	Taguchi	Sho	Ishimori	Yoh	Kanemaru
Austin	—N/a	Austin (11:37)	Austin (9:51)	Akira (10:56)	Takahashi (12:50)	Taguchi (12:02)	Sho (7:06)	Austin (11:24)	Austin (7:20)	Austin (10:58)
Zayne	Austin (11:37)	—N/a	Connors (7:10)	Zayne (10:54)	Takahashi (13:32)	Zayne (6:14)	Zayne (12:01)	Ishimori (13:45)	Yoh (11:07)	Zayne (11:31)
Connors	Austin (9:51)	Connors (7:10)	—N/a	Connors (8:13)	Takahashi (11:43)	Connors (8:25)	Sho (10:29)	Ishimori (8:45)	Yoh (12:03)	Connors (4:50)
Akira	Akira (10:56)	Zayne (10:54)	Connors (8:13)	—N/a	Takahashi (17:05)	Taguchi (12:17)	Akira (11:49)	Ishimori (11:24)	Akira (9:38)	Akira (10:32)
Takahashi	Takahashi (12:50)	Takahashi (13:32)	Takahashi (11:43)	Takahashi (17:05)	—N/a	Takahashi (10:32)	Sho (11:30)	Takahashi (22:30)	Yoh (17:57)	Kanemaru (6:47)
Taguchi	Taguchi (12:02)	Zayne (6:14)	Connors (8:25)	Taguchi (12:17)	Takahashi (10:32)	—N/a	Sho (10:53)	Ishimori (12:17)	Taguchi (8:01)	Kanemaru (2:13)
Sho	Sho (7:06)	Zayne (12:01)	Sho (10:29)	Akira (11:49)	Sho (11:30)	Sho (10:53)	—N/a	Ishimori (11:33)	Sho (10:33)	Kanemaru (2:44)
Ishimori	Austin (11:24)	Ishimori (13:45)	Ishimori (8:45)	Ishimori (11:24)	Takahashi (22:30)	Ishimori (12:17)	Ishimori (11:33)	—N/a	Ishimori (16:15)	Kanemaru (2:07)
Yoh	Austin (7:20)	Yoh (11:07)	Yoh (12:03)	Akira (9:38)	Yoh (17:57)	Taguchi (8:01)	Sho (10:33)	Ishimori (16:15)	—N/a	Yoh (10:43)
Kanemaru	Austin (10:58)	Zayne (11:31)	Connors (4:50)	Akira (10:32)	Kanemaru (6:47)	Kanemaru (2:13)	Kanemaru (2:44)	Kanemaru (2:07)	Yoh (10:43)	—N/a
Block B	Bushi	Douki	Desperado	Lindaman	Phantasmo	Wato	Eagles	TJP	Titán	Yuta
Bushi	—N/a	Douki (8:09)	Bushi (11:11)	Bushi (8:34)	Phantasmo (10:43)	Bushi (9:04)	Bushi (11:15)	TJP (10:08)	Titán (8:40)	Yuta (8:05)
Douki	Douki (8:09)	—N/a	Desperado (21:51)	Douki (9:21)	Douki (6:52)	Wato (9:48)	Eagles (11:57)	TJP (8:39)	Titán (9:31)	Yuta (9:55)
Desperado	Bushi (11:11)	Desperado (21:51)	—N/a	Lindaman (15:08)	Desperado (19:23)	Desperado (16:06)	Eagles (19:21)	Desperado (16:07)	Desperado (13:45)	Desperado (15:44)
Lindaman	Bushi (8:34)	Douki (9:21)	Lindaman (15:08)	—N/a	Phantasmo (8:40)	Wato (7:05)	Eagles (10:29)	Lindaman (11:11)	Lindaman (11:32)	Lindaman (9:17)
Phantasmo	Phantasmo (10:43)	Douki (6:52)	Desperado (19:23)	Phantasmo (8:40)	—N/a	Phantasmo (16:28)	Eagles (24:43)	Phantasmo (11:12)	Phantasmo (14:43)	Phantasmo (9:34)
Wato	Bushi (9:04)	Wato (9:48)	Desperado (16:06)	Wato (7:05)	Phantasmo (16:28)	—N/a	Wato (11:39)	TJP (12:21)	Wato (8:16)	Yuta (7:01)
Eagles	Bushi (11:15)	Eagles (11:57)	Eagles (19:21)	Eagles (10:29)	Eagles (24:43)	Wato (11:39)	—N/a	TJP (11:49)	Titán (10:56)	Eagles (11:30)
TJP	TJP (10:08)	TJP (8:39)	Desperado (16:07)	Lindaman (11:11)	Phantasmo (11:12)	TJP (12:21)	TJP (11:49)	—N/a	Titán (13:53)	Yuta (11:47)
Titán	Titán (8:40)	Titán (9:31)	Desperado (13:45)	Lindaman (11:32)	Phantasmo (10:43)	Wato (8:16)	Titán (10:56)	Titán (13:53)	—N/a	Yuta (7:01)
Yuta	Yuta (8:05)	Yuta (9:55)	Desperado (15:44)	Lindaman (9:17)	Phantasmo (9:34)	Yuta (7:57)	Eagles (11:30)	Yuta (11:47)	Yuta (7:01)	—N/a

Final
A1	Hiromu Takahashi	Pin
B1	El Desperado	30:37

=== 2023 ===
The thirtieth Best of the Super Juniors began on May 12 and finished on May 28 at Ota City General Gymnasium. The entire field of participants was announced on April 27, 2023. There were also 4 competitors making their tournament debuts: Lio Rush, Kevin Knight, "Speedball" Mike Bailey representing Impact Wrestling, and Dan Moloney representing Revolution Pro Wrestling (RevPro). The tournament was held in front of cheering crowds for the first time since the start of the COVID-19 pandemic. The schedule also featured semifinal block matches for the first time since 2014. Taiji Ishimori withdrew from the tournament after suffering a cervical spine injury, forcing him to forfeit his final match. Master Wato won, only to fail in his title match against Hiromu Takahashi at Dominion 6.4 in Osaka-jo Hall.

Final standings
Block A		Block B	
Mike Bailey	14	El Desperado	14
Titán	12	Master Wato	14
Lio Rush	12	Yoh	12
Hiromu Takahashi	12	Robbie Eagles	10
TJP	10	Clark Connors	8
Taiji Ishimori (withdrew)	10	Francesco Akira	8
Sho	8	Dan Moloney	8
Douki	6	Kevin Knight	6
Kushida	4	Yoshinobu Kanemaru	6
Ryusuke Taguchi	2	Bushi	4

Block A	Douki	Takahashi	Kushida	Rush	Bailey	Taguchi	Sho	Ishimori	Titán	TJP
Douki	—N/a	Takahashi (12:51)	Douki (8:32)	Douki (5:43)	Bailey (9:47)	Douki (7:46)	Sho (10:33)	Ishimori (9:31)	Titán (6:21)	TJP (8:22)
Takahashi	Takahashi (12:51)	—N/a	Takahashi (16:06)	Rush (18:11)	Bailey (16:40)	Takahashi (5:23)	Takahashi (7:50)	Takahashi (10:31)	Titán (16:43)	Takahashi (20:46)
Kushida	Douki (8:32)	Takahashi (16:06)	—N/a	Rush (8:38)	Kushida (9:26)	Taguchi (12:07)	Kushida (6:54)	Ishimori (13:30)	Titán (6:01)	TJP (9:27)
Rush	Douki (5:43)	Rush (18:11)	Rush (8:38)	—N/a	Bailey (16:43)	Rush (5:19)	Rush (4:20)	Rush (16:56)	Titán (10:23)	Rush (12:49)
Bailey	Bailey (9:47)	Bailey (16:40)	Kushida (9:26)	Bailey (16:43)	—N/a	Bailey (10:20)	Bailey (12:10)	Ishimori (10:27)	Bailey (9:56)	Bailey (13:01)
Taguchi	Douki (7:46)	Takahashi (5:23)	Taguchi (12:07)	Rush (5:19)	Bailey (10:20)	—N/a	Sho (6:29)	Ishimori (3:54)	Titán (9:21)	TJP (10:44)
Sho	Sho (10:33)	Takahashi (7:50)	Kushida (6:54)	Rush (4:20)	Bailey (12:10)	Sho (6:29)	—N/a	Sho (5:48)	Sho (7:38)	TJP (8:46)
Ishimori	Ishimori (9:31)	Takahashi (10:31)	Ishimori (13:30)	Rush (16:56)	Ishimori (10:27)	Ishimori (3:54)	Sho (5:48)	—N/a	Ishimori (9:24)	TJP (forfeit)
Titán	Titán (6:21)	Titán (16:43)	Titán (6:01)	Titán (10:23)	Bailey (9:56)	Titán (9:21)	Sho (7:38)	Ishimori (9:24)	—N/a	Titán (11:12)
TJP	TJP (8:22)	Takahashi (20:46)	TJP (9:27)	Rush (12:49)	Bailey (13:01)	TJP (10:44)	TJP (8:46)	TJP (forfeit)	Titán (11:12)	—N/a
Block B	Bushi	Connors	Moloney	Desperado	Akira	Knight	Wato	Eagles	Yoh	Kanemaru
Bushi	—N/a	Connors (6:04)	Moloney (7:12)	Desperado (8:54)	Bushi (8:44)	Knight (5:23)	Wato (8:01)	Eagles (9:10)	Yoh (8:02)	Bushi (1:46)
Connors	Connors (6:04)	—N/a	Moloney (4:25)	Desperado (12:21)	Connors (8:33)	Connors (9:20)	Wato (6:10)	Eagles (5:57)	Yoh (6:44)	Connors (6:19)
Moloney	Moloney (7:12)	Moloney (4:25)	—N/a	Desperado (9:35)	Akira (8:27)	Knight (8:15)	Wato (7:48)	Moloney (11:26)	Moloney (9:01)	Kanemaru (5:42)
Desperado	Desperado (8:54)	Desperado (12:21)	Desperado (9:35)	—N/a	Desperado (25:13)	Desperado (8:42)	Desperado (14:10)	Desperado (20:32)	Yoh (20:24)	Kanemaru (14:01)
Akira	Bushi (8:44)	Connors (8:33)	Akira (8:27)	Desperado (25:13)	—N/a	Akira (8:40)	Wato (7:20)	Akira (12:02)	Yoh (1:34)	Akira (4:09)
Knight	Knight (5:23)	Connors (9:20)	Knight (8:15)	Desperado (8:42)	Akira (8:40)	—N/a	Wato (9:32)	Eagles (8:45)	Yoh (8:57)	Knight (7:17)
Wato	Wato (8:01)	Wato (6:10)	Wato (7:48)	Desperado (14:10)	Wato (7:20)	Wato (9:32)	—N/a	Wato (19:37)	Yoh (18:12)	Wato (9:38)
Eagles	Eagles (9:10)	Eagles (5:57)	Moloney (11:26)	Desperado (20:32)	Akira (12:02)	Eagles (8:45)	Wato (19:37)	—N/a	Eagles (13:06)	Eagles (10:07)
Yoh	Yoh (8:02)	Yoh (6:44)	Moloney (9:01)	Yoh (20:24)	Yoh (1:34)	Yoh (8:57)	Yoh (18:12)	Eagles (13:06)	—N/a	Kanemaru (13:22)
Kanemaru	Bushi (1:46)	Connors (6:19)	Kanemaru (5:42)	Kanemaru (14:01)	Akira (4:09)	Knight (7:17)	Wato (9:38)	Eagles (10:07)	Kanemaru (13:22)	—N/a

Semifinals
A1	Mike Bailey	Pin
B2	Master Wato	16:43
B1	El Desperado	Sub
A2	Titán	21:44

Final
B2	Master Wato	Pin
A2	Titán	24:48

=== 2024 ===
The thirty-first Best of the Super Juniors began on May 11 and ended on June 9 at Osaka-jō Hall, at Dominion. The entire field of participants was announced on April 6, 2024. This year's tournament featured participants from New Japan Pro-Wrestling, Consejo Mundial de Lucha Libre, Ring of Honor, Pro Wrestling Noah, and Dragongate The tournament featured the debuts of Kosei Fujita (NJPW), Blake Christian (ROH), Hayata (Noah), Ninja Mack (Noah), and Dragon Dia (DG). Originally, Yoh and Ryusuke Taguchi were scheduled to participate in the tournament, but due to injuries, were replaced by Kushida and Dia, respectively. The tournament followed the same format as last year's tournament, with the top two wrestlers from each block advancing to the semi-finals, taking place on June 3. Francesco Akira withdrew the tournament due to a knee injury. For the firs time, the final not only happened at NJPW Dominion instead of setting up the junior title match, but main evented Dominion 6.9 in Osaka-jo Hall (2024) over even the IWGP World Heavyweight Championship match. Division ace El Desperado finally won a BOSJ (having twice lost the final to Hiromu Takahashi, and subsequently regained the title he'd lost to Sho in February in a steel cage match at June 16's New Japan Soul (Day 1) event. He would lost it 19 days later on the tour's final day to tournament semi-finalist & old Suzuki-gun stable-mate Douki.

Final standings
Block A		Block B	
El Desperado	12	Taiji Ishimori	14
TJP	10	Douki	12
Hayata	10	Hiromu Takahashi	12
Blake Christian	10	Robbie Eagles	10
Titán	10	Sho	10
Bushi	8	Drilla Moloney	10
Yoshinobu Kanemaru	8	Ninja Mack	8
Kevin Knight	8	Kushida	8
Clark Connors	8	Francesco Akira (withdrew)	4
Kosei Fujita	6	Dragon Dia	2

Block A	Christian	Bushi	Connors	Desperado	Hayata	Knight	Fujita	Titán	TJP	Kanemaru
Christian	—N/a	Christian (6:16)	Christian (10:52)	Desperado (18:11)	Hayata (10:20)	Christian (8:27)	Fujita (10:43)	Christian (7:21)	TJP (15:52)	Christian (8:30)
Bushi	Christian (6:16)	—N/a	Connors (8:46)	Desperado (13:02)	Hayata (7:05)	Bushi (8:16)	Bushi (5:32)	Titán (8:43)	Bushi (2:55)	Bushi (5:36)
Connors	Christian (10:52)	Connors (8:46)	—N/a	Desperado (14:37)	Connors (8:14)	Knight (9:42)	Fujita (9:16)	Connors (7:52)	Connors (12:28)	Kanemaru (3:20)
Desperado	Desperado (18:11)	Desperado (13:02)	Desperado (14:37)	—N/a	Desperado (20:27)	Knight (12:01)	Desperado (17:16)	Titán (14:42)	TJP (21:10)	Desperado (16:57)
Hayata	Hayata (10:20)	Hayata (7:05)	Connors (8:14)	Desperado (20:27)	—N/a	Hayata (8:16)	Hayata (8:57)	Titán (11:34)	TJP (13:01)	Hayata (7:26)
Knight	Christian (8:27)	Bushi (8:16)	Knight (9:42)	Knight (12:01)	Hayata (8:16)	—N/a	Knight (9:05)	Titán (8:24)	Knight (15:02)	Kanemaru (6:50)
Fujita	Fujita (10:43)	Bushi (5:32)	Fujita (9:16)	Desperado (17:16)	Hayata (8:57)	Knight (9:05)	—N/a	Titán (7:01)	TJP (12:13)	Fujita (8:23)
Titán	Christian (7:21)	Titán (8:43)	Connors (7:52)	Titán (14:42)	Titán (11:34)	Titán (8:24)	Titán (7:01)	—N/a	TJP (13:21)	Kanemaru (8:48)
TJP	TJP (15:52)	Bushi (2:55)	Connors (12:28)	TJP (21:10)	TJP (13:01)	Knight (15:02)	TJP (12:13)	TJP (13:21)	—N/a	Kanemaru (2:18)
Kanemaru	Christian (8:30)	Bushi (5:36)	Kanemaru (3:20)	Desperado (16:57)	Hayata (7:26)	Kanemaru (6:50)	Fujita (8:23)	Kanemaru (8:48)	Kanemaru (2:18)	—N/a
Block B	Douki	Dia	Moloney	Akira	Takahashi	Kushida	Mack	Eagles	Sho	Ishimori
Douki	—N/a	Douki (5:28)	Moloney (9:26)	Douki (forfeit)	Douki (16:35)	Douki (12:20)	Douki (7:49)	Douki (15:41)	Sho (20:17)	Ishimori (10:52)
Dia	Douki (5:28)	—N/a	Moloney (4:12)	Akira (5:35)	Takahashi (12:31)	Dia (8:04)	Mack (8:30)	Eagles (6:56)	Sho (6:44)	Ishimori (4:58)
Moloney	Moloney (9:26)	Moloney (4:12)	—N/a	Moloney (4:38)	Takahashi (19:23)	Moloney (9:20)	Moloney (6:08)	Eagles (9:21)	Sho (8:13)	Ishimori (6:16)
Akira	Douki (forfeit)	Akira (5:35)	Moloney (4:38)	—N/a	Takahashi (forfeit)	Kushida (12:31)	Mack (7:40)	Eagles (forfeit)	Sho (forfeit)	Akira (8:35)
Takahashi	Douki (16:35)	Takahashi (12:31)	Takahashi (19:23)	Takahashi (forfeit)	—N/a	Kushida (12:24)	Takahashi (9:10)	Takahashi (22:26)	Takahashi (18:23)	Ishimori (20:10)
Kushida	Douki (12:20)	Dia (8:04)	Moloney (9:20)	Kushida (12:31)	Kushida (12:24)	—N/a	Mack (5:58)	Eagles (11:18)	Kushida (6:31)	Kushida (2:33)
Mack	Douki (7:49)	Mack (8:30)	Moloney (6:08)	Mack (7:40)	Takahashi (9:10)	Mack (5:58)	—N/a	Mack (6:51)	Sho (9:20)	Ishimori (7:23)
Eagles	Douki (15:41)	Eagles (6:56)	Eagles (9:21)	Eagles (forfeit)	Takahashi (22:26)	Eagles (11:18)	Mack (6:51)	—N/a	Eagles (14:40)	Ishimori (15:21)
Sho	Sho (20:17)	Sho (6:44)	Sho (8:13)	Sho (forfeit)	Takahashi (18:23)	Kushida (6:31)	Sho (9:20)	Eagles (14:40)	—N/a	Ishimori (12:32)
Ishimori	Ishimori (10:52)	Ishimori (4:58)	Ishimori (6:16)	Akira (8:35)	Ishimori (20:10)	Kushida (2:33)	Ishimori (7:23)	Ishimori (15:21)	Ishimori (12:32)	—N/a

Semifinals
A1	El Desperado	Pin
B2	Douki	22:21
B1	Taiji Ishimori	Pin
A2	TJP	19:31

Final
A1	El Desperado	Pin
B1	Taiji Ishimori	23:34

=== 2025 ===
The thirty-second Best of the Super Juniors began on May 10 and finished on June 1 at Ota City General Gymnasium. The entire field of participants was announced on April 5, 2025. This year's tournament featured participants from New Japan Pro-Wrestling, Consejo Mundial de Lucha Libre, All Elite Wrestling, DDT Pro-Wrestling, and Dragongate. This tournament featured the debuts of Mao (DDT) and Nick Wayne (AEW). Bushi was originally supposed to take part in the tournament, but after announcing that he would depart NJPW, he was replaced by Robbie X. 22-year old Kosei Fujita won the tournament, but failed to defeat El Desperado for his championship at the New Japan Soul tour finale on July 6. Neither man wreslted at Dominion 6.15 in Osaka-jo Hall.

Final standings
Block A		Block B	
Kosei Fujita	10	Yoh	12
Hiromu Takahashi	10	El Desperado	12
Clark Connors	10	Mao	12
Master Wato	10	Sho	8
Francesco Akira	10	Kevin Knight	8
Kushida	8	Taiji Ishimori	8
Ninja Mack	8	Robbie Eagles	8
Dragon Dia	8	Nick Wayne	8
Robbie X	8	Titán	8
Yoshinobu Kanemaru	8	Ryusuke Taguchi	6

Block A	Connors	Dia	Akira	Takahashi	Fujita	Kushida	Wato	Mack	Robbie	Kanemaru
Connors	—N/a	Dia (5:31)	Connors (7:14)	Takahashi (20:07)	Fujita (13:32)	Connors (10:21)	Connors (10:34)	Connors (5:34)	Connors (7:45)	Kanemaru (3:53)
Dia	Dia (5:31)	—N/a	Akira (9:54)	Dia (11:58)	Fujita (8:14)	Kushida (11:26)	Wato (8:19)	Mack (10:10)	Dia (8:25)	Dia (10:51)
Akira	Connors (7:14)	Akira (9:54)	—N/a	Akira (18:16)	Fujita (12:03)	Akira (10:46)	Wato (12:09)	Akira (4:57)	Akira (9:03)	Kanemaru (4:53)
Takahashi	Takahashi (20:07)	Dia (11:58)	Akira (18:16)	—N/a	Fujita (16:52)	Takahashi (13:03)	Takahashi (13:33)	Takahashi (10:46)	Robbie (15:54)	Takahashi (8:26)
Fujita	Fujita (13:32)	Fujita (8:14)	Fujita (12:03)	Fujita (16:52)	—N/a	Kushida (14:07)	Fujita (7:00)	Mack (9:57)	Robbie (7:51)	Kanemaru (9:46)
Kushida	Connors (10:21)	Kushida (11:26)	Akira (10:46)	Takahashi (13:03)	Kushida (14:07)	—N/a	Wato (10:58)	Kushida (5:52)	Robbie (8:49)	Kushida (4:28)
Wato	Connors (10:34)	Wato (8:19)	Wato (12:09)	Takahashi (13:33)	Fujita (7:00)	Wato (10:58)	—N/a	Wato (7:01)	Wato (17:12)	Kanemaru (8:36)
Mack	Connors (5:34)	Mack (10:10)	Akira (4:57)	Takahashi (10:46)	Mack (9:57)	Kushida (5:52)	Wato (7:01)	—N/a	Mack (7:48)	Mack (2:05)
Robbie	Connors (7:45)	Dia (8:35)	Akira (9:03)	Robbie (15:54)	Robbie (7:51)	Robbie (8:49)	Wato (17:12)	Mack (7:47)	—N/a	Robbie (4:10)
Kanemaru	Kanemaru (3:53)	Dia (10:51)	Kanemaru (4:53)	Takahashi (8:26)	Kanemaru (9:46)	Kushida (4:28)	Kanemaru (8:36)	Mack (2:05)	Robbie (4:10)	—N/a
Block B	Desperado	Knight	Mao	Wayne	Eagles	Taguchi	Sho	Ishimori	Titán	Yoh
Desperado	—N/a	Desperado (14:26)	Desperado (23:27)	Wayne (15:01)	Desperado (17:44)	Desperado (14:40)	Desperado (12:25)	Ishimori (11:49)	Desperado (14:10)	Yoh (16:12)
Knight	Desperado (14:26)	—N/a	Mao (9:52)	Knight (11:05)	Eagles (9:20)	Knight (8:41)	Knight (7:39)	Ishimori (9:58)	Knight (5:48)	Yoh (8:23)
Mao	Desperado (23:27)	Mao (9:52)	—N/a	Mao (7:42)	Mao (9:26)	Mao (8:32)	Mao (11:56)	Mao (9:43)	Titán (9:20)	Yoh (8:11)
Wayne	Wayne (15:04)	Knight (11:05)	Mao (7:42)	—N/a	Wayne (8:21)	Wayne (6:44)	Wayne (10:43)	Ishimori (10:35)	Titán (8:13)	Yoh (10:20)
Eagles	Desperado (17:44)	Eagles (9:20)	Mao (9:26)	Wayne (8:21)	—N/a	Eagles (6:00)	Sho (8:10)	Ishimori (12:02)	Eagles (12:39)	Eagles (15:03)
Taguchi	Desperado (14:40)	Knight (8:41)	Mao (8:32)	Wayne (6:44)	Eagles (6:00)	—N/a	Taguchi (0:05)	Taguchi (16:44)	Titán (2:35)	Taguchi (6:01)
Sho	Desperado (12:25)	Knight (7:39)	Mao (11:56)	Wayne (10:43)	Sho (8:10)	Taguchi (0:05)	—N/a	Sho (9:43)	Sho (7:46)	Sho (11:04)
Ishimori	Ishimori (11:49)	Ishimori (9:58)	Mao (9:43)	Ishimori (10:35)	Ishimori (12:02)	Taguchi (16:44)	Sho (9:43)	—N/a	Titàn (11:13)	Yoh (15:49)
Titán	Desperado (14:10)	Knight (5:48)	Titán (9:20)	Titán (8:13)	Eagles (12:39)	Titán (2:35)	Sho (7:46)	Titàn (11:13)	—N/a	Yoh (4:48)
Yoh	Yoh (16:12)	Yoh (8:23)	Yoh (8:11)	Yoh (10:20)	Eagles (15:03)	Taguchi (6:01)	Sho (11:04)	Yoh (15:49)	Yoh (4:48)	—N/a

Final
A1	Kosei Fujita	Pin
B1	Yoh	28:04

=== 2026 ===
The thirty-third Best of the Super Juniors was held from May 14 to June 7, concluding at Ota City General Gymnasium. The full list of participants was announced on April 4, 2026, at Sakura Genesis. This year's tournament featured participants from New Japan Pro-Wrestling, Consejo Mundial de Lucha Libre, All Elite Wrestling, DDT Pro-Wrestling, Dragongate, and Pro Wrestling Freedoms. This tournament featured the debuts of Valiente Jr. (CMLL), Jun Kasai (Freedoms), Jakob Austin Young (NJPW) and Hyo (DG), as well as the return of Daisuke Sasaki (DDT), 14 years after his last appearance, making it the longest gap between BOSJ appearances. On April 29, continuing his established penchant for cowardice throughout the reign, House of Torture-aligned IWGP Junior Heavyweight Champion Douki announced that he would not participate in the tournament, with him being replaced by Daiki Nagai, who was making his tournament debut.

This was the second time a final match-up had repeated, and the first time in tournament history it had done so in back-to-back years. This time, having made it to the final twice before, Yoh defeated Kosei Fujita to finally win BoSJ. He likewise went on to finally win the junior championship and end Douki's reign of terror at Dominion 6.14 in Osaka-jo Hall.

Current standings
Block A		Block B	
Master Wato	12	Robbie Eagles	12
Kosei Fujita	12	Yoh	12
Francesco Akira	12	El Desperado	12
Jun Kasai	10	Taiji Ishimori	12
Robbie X	10	Sho	12
Titán	10	Kushida	6
Nick Wayne	10	Jakob Austin Young	6
Ryusuke Taguchi	8	Yoshinobu Kanemaru	6
Valiente Jr.	6	Hyo	6
Daiki Nagai	0	Daisuke Sasaki	6

Block A	Wato	Taguchi	Fujita	Robbie	Akira	Nagai	Titán	Valiente	Wayne	Kasai
Wato	—N/a	Taguchi (2:10)	Wato (14:30)	Wato (9:10)	Wato (11:09)	Wato (7:45)	Titán (9:43)	Wato (7:17)	Wato (14:10)	Kasai (10:14)
Taguchi	Taguchi (2:10)	—N/a	Fujita (6:23)	Robbie (8:07)	Akira (1:54)	Taguchi (6:02)	Titán (7:31)	Taguchi (00:49)	Wayne (2:52)	Taguchi (5:10)
Fujita	Wato (14:30)	Fujita (6:23)	—N/a	Robbie (16:57)	Fujita (16:56)	Fujita (8:24)	Fujita (12:50)	Fujita (11:01)	Fujita (11:38)	Kasai (12:58)
Robbie	Wato (9:10)	Robbie (8:07)	Robbie (16:57)	—N/a	Robbie (8:53)	Robbie (7:11)	Robbie (15:28)	Valiente (8:24)	Wayne (7:30)	Kasai (12:06)
Akira	Wato (11:09)	Akira (1:54)	Fujita (16:56)	Robbie (8:53)	—N/a	Akira (13:15)	Akira (13:54)	Akira (9:34)	Akira (10:08)	Akira (13:01)
Nagai	Wato (7:45)	Taguchi (6:02)	Fujita (8:24)	Robbie (7:11)	Akira (13:15)	—N/a	Titán (4:35)	Valiente (4:50)	Wayne (5:24)	Kasai (4:46)
Titán	Titán (9:43)	Titán (7:31)	Fujita (12:50)	Robbie (15:28)	Akira (13:54)	Titán (4:35)	—N/a	Titán (7:44)	Wayne (12:01)	Titán (9:08)
Valiente	Wato (7:17)	Taguchi (00:49)	Fujita (11:01)	Valiente (8:24)	Akira (9:34)	Valiente (4:50)	Titán (7:44)	—N/a	Wayne (7:16)	Valiente (7:01)
Wayne	Wato (14:10)	Wayne (2:50)	Fujita (11:38)	Wayne (7:30)	Akira (10:08)	Wayne (5:24)	Wayne (12:01)	Wayne (7:16)	—N/a	Kasai (13:50)
Kasai	Kasai (10:14)	Taguchi (5:10)	Kasai (12:58)	Kasai (12:06)	Akira (13:01)	Kasai (4:46)	Titán (9:08)	Valiente (7:01)	Kasai (13:50)	—N/a
Block B	Desperado	Kushida	Yoh	Eagles	Ishimori	Young	Sho	Kanemaru	Hyo	Sasaki
Desperado	—N/a	Desperado (14:35)	Yoh (16:44)	Eagles (17:50)	Desperado (15:01)	Desperado (7:37)	Desperado (10:21)	Desperado (5:42)	Desperado (12:16)	Sasaki (16:10)
Kushida	Desperado (14:35)	—N/a	Kushida (9:56)	Kushida (9:11)	Ishimori (6:20)	Young (3:03)	Sho (9:45)	Kushida (8:22)	Hyo (11:13)	Sasaki (7:17)
Yoh	Yoh (16:44)	Kushida (9:56)	—N/a	Eagles (18:37)	Yoh (12:24)	Yoh (5:18)	Yoh (13:22)	Yoh (3:43)	Hyo (2:36)	Yoh (9:42)
Eagles	Eagles (17:50)	Kushida (9:11)	Eagles (18:37)	—N/a	Eagles (12:06)	Eagles (9:36)	Sho (12:10)	Kanemaru (6:42)	Eagles (8:34)	Eagles (13:17)
Ishimori	Desperado (15:01)	Ishimori (6:20)	Yoh (12:24)	Eagles (12:06)	—N/a	Ishimori (8:10)	Ishimori (14:45)	Ishimori (3:38)	Ishimori (3:38)	Ishimori (11:36)
Young	Desperado (7:37)	Young (3:03)	Yoh (5:18)	Eagles (9:36)	Ishimori (8:10)	—N/a	Sho (3:06)	Kanemaru (2:50)	Young (9:18)	Young (6:58)
Sho	Desperado (10:21)	Sho (9:45)	Yoh (13:22)	Sho (12:10)	Ishimori (14:45)	Sho (3:06)	—N/a	Sho (3:25)	Sho (11:13)	Sho (6:34)
Kanemaru	Desperado (5:42)	Kushida (8:22)	Yoh (3:43)	Kanemaru (6:42)	Ishimori (3:38)	Kanemaru (2:50)	Sho (3:25)	—N/a	Hyo (10:11)	Kanemaru (6:47)
Hyo	Desperado (12:16)	Hyo (11:13)	Hyo (2:36)	Eagles (8:34)	Ishimori (3:38)	Young (9:18)	Sho (11:13)	Hyo (10:11)	—N/a	Sasaki (9:34)
Sasaki	Sasaki (16:10)	Sasaki (7:17)	Yoh (9:42)	Eagles (13:17)	Ishimori (11:36)	Young (6:58)	Sho (6:34)	Kanemaru (6:47)	Sasaki (9:34)	—N/a

Semifinals
A1	Master Wato	16:43
B2	Yoh	Sub
B1	Robbie Eagles	18:42
A2	Kosei Fujita	Pin

Final
B2	Yoh	Pin
A2	Kosei Fujita	28:01
