= G1 Climax 30 =

2020 edition of the G1 Climax

- G1 Climax 30 logo
- Promotion: New Japan Pro-Wrestling
- Date: September 19 to October 18, 2020
- City: See venues
- Venue: See venues
- Tagline: Be The One!

Event chronology
← Previous; Lion's Break Crown	Next → Road to Power Struggle

G1 Climax chronology
← Previous; G1 Climax 29	Next → G1 Climax 31

G1 Climax 30
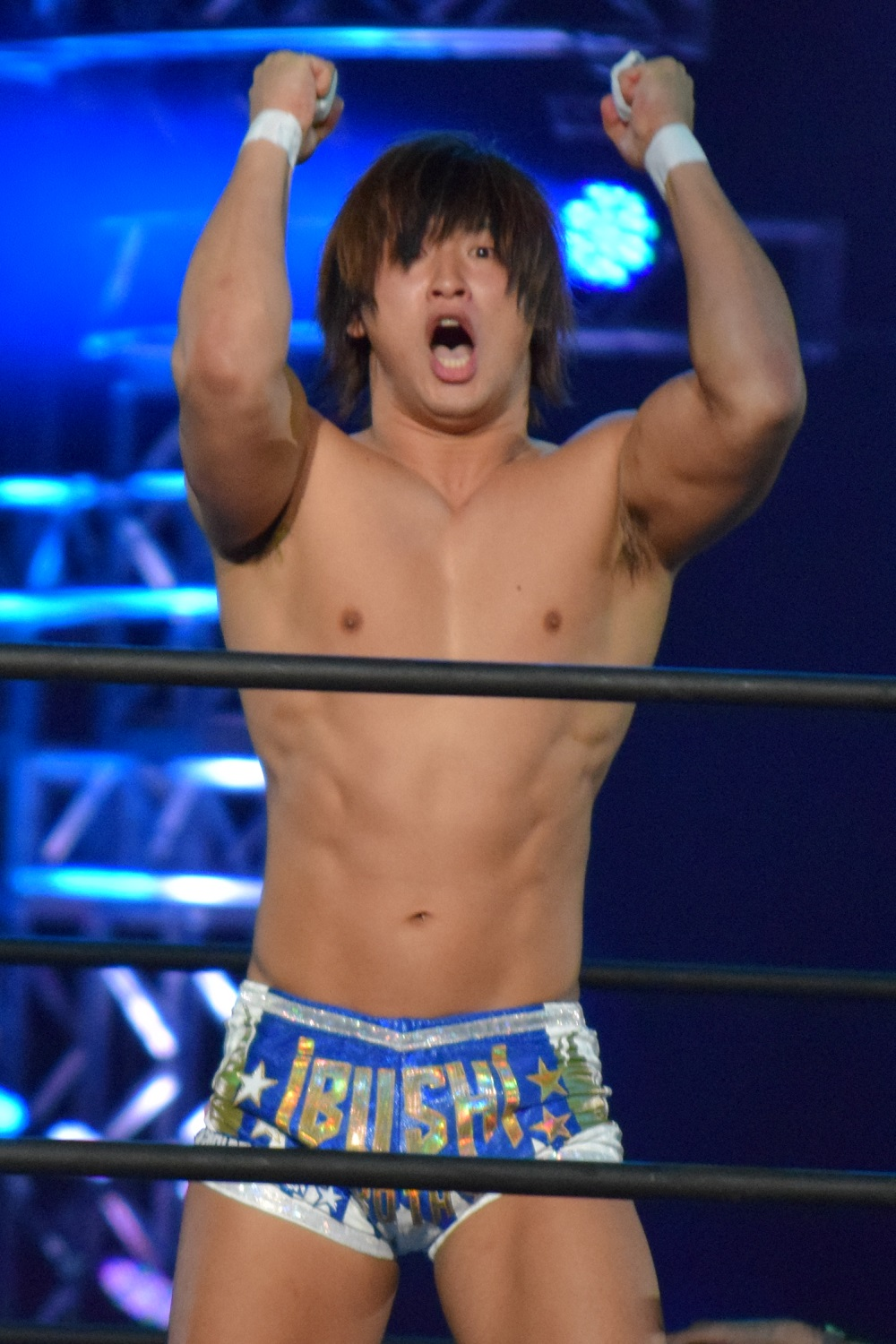
- Kota Ibushi, winner of G1 Climax 30

Tournament information
- Sport: Professional wrestling
- Location: Japan
- Dates: September 19, 2020–October 18, 2020
- Tournament format: Two-block round-robin tournament
- Participants: 20

Final positions
- Champion: Kota Ibushi
- Runner-up: Sanada

Tournament statistics
- Bouts fought: 91

The G1 Climax 30 was a professional wrestling tournament produced by New Japan Pro-Wrestling (NJPW). The tournament commenced on September 19 and concluded on October 18, 2020. It was the thirtieth edition of G1 Climax, and forty-sixth edition of the tournament counting its previous forms under different names. A Block winner Kota Ibushi defeated B Block winner Sanada in the final to win the tournament.

Considered NJPW's most important tournament, the G1 Climax features twenty wrestlers, divided in two blocks of ten ("A" and "B"). Each participant faces all nine other wrestlers within the same block in singles matches. The winner of each block is determined via a point system, with two points for a win, one point for a draw, and no point for a defeat; each night of the event sees the ten members of one block compete for the tournament. On the final day of the event, the winners of both blocks face each other to determine the winner of the G1 Climax, who will gain a future match for the IWGP Heavyweight Championship at Wrestle Kingdom, NJPW's biggest yearly event. The event was broadcast live on TV Asahi and Fighting TV Samurai in Japan, and New Japan Pro-Wrestling World worldwide.

== Production ==
Other on-screen personnel
Role:	Name:
English Commentators	Kevin Kelly (nights 1–16 VOD, 17–19 live)
English Commentators	Rocky Romero (nights 1–16 VOD, 17–19 live)
English Commentators	Chris Charlton (nights 17–19)
Japanese Commentators	Koki Yamazaki (nights 1, 2, 5)
Japanese Commentators	Shinji Yoshino (nights 1, 2, 11, 12, 19)
Japanese Commentators	Shigeki Kiyono (nights 8–13)
Japanese Commentators	Yuichi Tabata (nights 1, 2, 5, 11, 12, 17)
Japanese Commentators	Haruo Murata (nights 3, 4, 6, 7, 14–16)
Japanese Commentators	Kazuo Yamazaki (nights 6 & 18)
Japanese Commentators	Yohei Onishi (nights 5, 18, 19)
Japanese Commentators	Milano Collection A.T.
Japanese Commentators	Souichi Shibata (nights 7–9)
Japanese Commentators	Jyushin Thunder Liger (nights 1, 2, 10, 13, 15, 16, 19)
Japanese Commentators	Miki Motoi (nights 3, 4, 6, 14)
Japanese Commentators	Katsuhiko Kanazawa (nights 5, 6, 17)
Japanese Commentators	Daisuke Takahashi (nights 6 & 7)
Japanese Commentators	Kazuki Kusanagi (night 17)
Japanese Commentators	Hiroki Mikami (nights 17 & 18)
Japanese Commentators	Shunpei Terakawa (nights 18 & 19)
Ring announcers	Kimihiko Ozaki
Ring announcers	Makoto Abe
Referees	Kenta Sato
Referees	Marty Asami
Referees	Red Shoes Unno

=== Tournament rules ===
The tournament features twenty wrestlers, divided in two blocks of ten ("A" and "B"). Each participant faces all nine other wrestler within the same block in singles match, with the winner of each block being determined via a point system, gaining two points for a win, one point for a draw, and no point for a loss; each night of the event sees the ten members of a same block compete for the tournament. In case of several wrestler sharing the top score, the results of the matches those wrestlers had when facing each others in the tournament act as tiebreaker, with the one having the most wins over the other top-scorers determining the winner of the block.

On the final day of the event, the respective winners of both blocks face each other to determine the winner of the G1 Climax, who would gain a future match for the IWGP Heavyweight Championship, NJPW's top championship, at Wrestle Kingdom, NJPW's biggest yearly event; if the IWGP Heavyweight Champion himself wins, he gets to pick his opponent at Wrestle Kingdom. The Young Lion matches have a fifteen-minutes time limit, while the matches of the tournament have a 30-minutes time limit (with the time limit being reached resulting in a tie); the final match between the two block winners has no time limit.

=== History ===
In January 2020, NJPW announced that the 2020 edition of the G1 Climax would take place from September to October, instead of its usual July–August schedule, to avoid conflict with the 2020 Summer Olympics. During the New Japan Road event on September 9, NJPW announced the full tournament bracket for the G1 Climax.

=== Storylines ===
The event includes matches that result from scripted storylines, where wrestlers portray heroes, villains, or less distinguishable characters in scripted events that build tension and culminate in a wrestling match or series of matches.

The tournament saw the in-ring returns of Juice Robinson and Will Ospreay to NJPW for the first time since the COVID-19 pandemic began. Jay White, Jeff Cobb, and Kenta returned to NJPW in August on their weekly TV show, NJPW Strong, which was taped in America. However, this tournament was White, Cobb, and Kenta's returns to Japan since the start of the pandemic.

=== Venues ===
Dates	Venue	Location
September 19	Osaka Prefectural Gymnasium	Namba, Osaka
September 20	Osaka Prefectural Gymnasium	Namba, Osaka
September 23	Hokkaido Prefectural Sports Center	Toyohira-ku, Sapporo
September 24	Hokkaido Prefectural Sports Center	Toyohira-ku, Sapporo
September 27	World Memorial Hall	Chūō-ku, Kobe
September 29	Korakuen Hall	Bunkyo, Tokyo
September 30	Korakuen Hall	Bunkyo, Tokyo
October 1	City Hall Plaza Aore Nagaoka	Nagaoka, Niigata
October 5	Takamatsu City General Gymnasium	Takamatsu, Kagawa
October 6	Hiroshima Sun Plaza	Nishi-ku, Hiroshima
October 7	Hiroshima Sun Plaza	Nishi-ku, Hiroshima
October 8	Zip Arena Okayama	Okayama, Okayama
October 10	Osaka Prefectural Gymnasium	Namba, Osaka
October 11	Aichi Prefectural Gymnasium	Nagoya, Aichi
October 13	Hamamatsu Arena	Hamamatsu, Shizuoka
October 14	Yokohama Budokan	Kanagawa-ku, Yokohama
October 16	Ryogoku Kokugikan	Sumida, Tokyo
October 17	Ryogoku Kokugikan	Sumida, Tokyo
October 18	Ryogoku Kokugikan	Sumida, Tokyo

== Results ==
=== Night 1 (A Block) ===
The first night of A Block took place on September 19, 2020 at the Osaka Prefectural Gymnasium in Namba, Osaka.

No.	Results	Stipulations	Times
1	Yuya Uemura defeated Yota Tsuji by submission	Singles match	6:57
2	Will Ospreay defeated Yujiro Takahashi	Singles match for the G1 Climax tournament	7:34
3	Taichi defeated Jeff Cobb	Singles match for the G1 Climax tournament	12:47
4	Minoru Suzuki defeated Tomohiro Ishii	Singles match for the G1 Climax tournament	13:00
5	Jay White defeated Shingo Takagi	Singles match for the G1 Climax tournament	19:28
6	Kota Ibushi defeated Kazuchika Okada	Singles match for the G1 Climax tournament	21:35

==== Tournament scores ====
Rank	Wrestler	Result	Points	
Rank	Wrestler	Result	Pre	Post
1	Kota Ibushi	Win	0	2
1	Jay White	Win	0	2
1	Minoru Suzuki	Win	0	2
1	Taichi	Win	0	2
1	Will Ospreay	Win	0	2
2	Shingo Takagi	Loss	0	0
2	Jeff Cobb	Loss	0	0
2	Tomohiro Ishii	Loss	0	0
2	Yujiro Takahashi	Loss	0	0
2	Kazuchika Okada	Loss	0	0

=== Night 2 (B Block) ===
The first night of B Block took place on September 20, 2020 at the Osaka Prefectural Gymnasium in Namba, Osaka.

No.	Results	Stipulations	Times
1	Yota Tsuji defeated Gabriel Kidd by submission	Singles match	9:15
2	Juice Robinson defeated Yoshi-Hashi	Singles match for the G1 Climax tournament	15:57
3	Toru Yano defeated Sanada by count out	Singles match for the G1 Climax tournament	6:16
4	Kenta defeated Hirooki Goto by submission	Singles match for the G1 Climax tournament	17:15
5	Zack Sabre Jr. defeated Evil	Singles match for the G1 Climax tournament	14:54
6	Tetsuya Naito defeated Hiroshi Tanahashi	Singles match for the G1 Climax tournament	27:16

==== Tournament scores ====
Rank	Wrestler	Result	Points	
Rank	Wrestler	Result	Pre	Post
1	Tetsuya Naito	Win	0	2
1	Toru Yano	Win	0	2
1	Juice Robinson	Win	0	2
1	Zack Sabre Jr.	Win	0	2
1	Kenta	Win	0	2
2	Hiroshi Tanahashi	Loss	0	0
2	Sanada	Loss	0	0
2	Yoshi-Hashi	Loss	0	0
2	Evil	Loss	0	0
2	Hirooki Goto	Loss	0	0

=== Night 3 (A Block) ===
The second night of A Block took place on September 23, 2020 at the Hokkaido Prefectural Sports Center in Toyohira-ku, Sapporo.

No.	Results	Stipulations	Times
1	Gabriel Kidd defeated Yuya Uemura	Singles match	7:21
2	Jeff Cobb defeated Shingo Takagi	Singles match for the G1 Climax tournament	11:44
3	Kazuchika Okada defeated Yujiro Takahashi by submission	Singles match for the G1 Climax tournament	12:01
4	Taichi defeated Minoru Suzuki	Singles match for the G1 Climax tournament	12:11
5	Will Ospreay defeated Tomohiro Ishii	Singles match for the G1 Climax tournament	18:20
6	Jay White (with Gedo) defeated Kota Ibushi	Singles match for the G1 Climax tournament	20:28

==== Tournament scores ====
Rank	Wrestler	Result	Points	
Rank	Wrestler	Result	Pre	Post
1	Will Ospreay	Win	2	4
1	Taichi	Win	2	4
1	Jay White	Win	2	4
2	Kota Ibushi	Loss	2	2
2	Minoru Suzuki	Loss	2	2
2	Kazuchika Okada	Win	0	2
2	Jeff Cobb	Win	0	2
3	Tomohiro Ishii	Loss	0	0
3	Yujiro Takahashi	Loss	0	0
3	Shingo Takagi	Loss	0	0

=== Night 4 (B Block) ===
The second night of B Block took place on September 24, 2020 at the Hokkaido Prefectural Sports Center in Toyohira-ku, Sapporo.

No.	Results	Stipulations	Times
1	Yota Tsuji defeated Yuya Uemura by submission	Singles match	8:13
2	Hirooki Goto defeated Sanada	Singles match for the G1 Climax tournament	11:03
3	Toru Yano defeated Hiroshi Tanahashi	Singles match for the G1 Climax tournament	7:15
4	Juice Robinson defeated Kenta	Singles match for the G1 Climax tournament	17:01
5	Evil defeated Yoshi-Hashi	Singles match for the G1 Climax tournament	17:21
6	Tetsuya Naito defeated Zack Sabre Jr.	Singles match for the G1 Climax tournament	28:28

==== Tournament scores ====
Rank	Wrestler	Result	Points	
Rank	Wrestler	Result	Pre	Post
1	Tetsuya Naito	Win	2	4
1	Toru Yano	Win	2	4
1	Juice Robinson	Win	2	4
2	Zack Sabre Jr.	Loss	2	2
2	Kenta	Loss	2	2
2	Evil	Win	0	2
2	Hirooki Goto	Win	0	2
3	Hiroshi Tanahashi	Loss	0	0
3	Sanada	Loss	0	0
3	Yoshi-Hashi	Loss	0	0

=== Night 5 (A Block) ===
The third night of A Block took place on September 27, 2020 at the World Memorial Hall in Chūō-ku, Kobe.

No.	Results	Stipulations	Times
1	Gabriel Kidd defeated Yota Tsuji	Singles match	7:40
2	Taichi defeated Yujiro Takahashi	Singles match for the G1 Climax tournament	11:03
3	Minoru Suzuki defeated Jeff Cobb	Singles match for the G1 Climax tournament	9:24
4	Kota Ibushi defeated Tomohiro Ishii	Singles match for the G1 Climax tournament	15:41
5	Shingo Takagi defeated Will Ospreay	Singles match for the G1 Climax tournament	22:03
6	Jay White defeated Kazuchika Okada	Singles match for the G1 Climax tournament	18:48

==== Tournament scores ====
Rank	Wrestler	Result	Points	
Rank	Wrestler	Result	Pre	Post
1	Taichi	Win	4	6
1	Jay White	Win	4	6
2	Will Ospreay	Loss	4	4
2	Kota Ibushi	Win	2	4
2	Minoru Suzuki	Win	2	4
3	Kazuchika Okada	Loss	2	2
3	Jeff Cobb	Loss	2	2
3	Shingo Takagi	Win	0	2
4	Tomohiro Ishii	Loss	0	0
4	Yujiro Takahashi	Loss	0	0

=== Night 6 (B Block) ===
The third night of B Block took place on September 29, 2020 at Korakuen Hall in Bunkyo, Tokyo.

No.	Results	Stipulations	Times
1	Yuya Uemura defeated Gabriel Kidd by submission	Singles match	9:10
2	Yoshi-Hashi defeated Sanada	Singles match for the G1 Climax tournament	15:15
3	Kenta defeated Zack Sabre Jr.	Singles match for the G1 Climax tournament	15:46
4	Hiroshi Tanahashi defeated Juice Robinson	Singles match for the G1 Climax tournament	14:16
5	Toru Yano defeated Evil	Singles match for the G1 Climax tournament	4:33
6	Tetsuya Naito defeated Hirooki Goto	Singles match for the G1 Climax tournament	21:58

==== Tournament scores ====
Rank	Wrestler	Result	Points	
Rank	Wrestler	Result	Pre	Post
1	Tetsuya Naito	Win	4	6
1	Toru Yano	Win	4	6
2	Juice Robinson	Loss	4	4
2	Kenta	Win	2	4
3	Zack Sabre Jr.	Loss	2	2
3	Evil	Loss	2	2
3	Hirooki Goto	Loss	2	2
4	Hiroshi Tanahashi	Win	0	2
4	Yoshi-Hashi	Win	0	2
5	Sanada	Loss	0	0

=== Night 7 (A Block) ===
The fourth night of A Block took place on September 30, 2020 at Korakuen Hall in Bunkyo, Tokyo.

No.	Results	Stipulations	Times
1	Yota Tsuji defeated Yuya Uemura by submission	Singles match	7:35
2	Minoru Suzuki defeated Yujiro Takahashi	Singles match for the G1 Climax tournament	7:53
3	Kota Ibushi defeated Jeff Cobb	Singles match for the G1 Climax tournament	10:43
4	Kazuchika Okada defeated Taichi by referee stoppage	Singles match for the G1 Climax tournament	17:03
5	Will Ospreay defeated Jay White	Singles match for the G1 Climax tournament	18:46
6	Tomohiro Ishii defeated Shingo Takagi	Singles match for the G1 Climax tournament	26:01

==== Tournament scores ====
Rank	Wrestler	Result	Points	
Rank	Wrestler	Result	Pre	Post
1	Taichi	Loss	6	6
1	Jay White	Loss	6	6
1	Will Ospreay	Win	4	6
1	Kota Ibushi	Win	4	6
1	Minoru Suzuki	Win	4	6
2	Kazuchika Okada	Win	2	4
3	Jeff Cobb	Loss	2	2
3	Shingo Takagi	Loss	2	2
3	Tomohiro Ishii	Win	0	2
4	Yujiro Takahashi	Loss	0	0

=== Night 8 (B Block) ===
The fourth night of B Block took place on October 1, 2020 at City Hall Plaza Aore Nagaoka in Nagaoka, Niigata.

No.	Results	Stipulations	Times
1	Yota Tsuji vs. Gabriel Kidd ended in a time limit draw	Singles match	15:00
2	Juice Robinson defeated Toru Yano	Singles match for the G1 Climax tournament	6:42
3	Zack Sabre Jr. defeated Hirooki Goto	Singles match for the G1 Climax tournament	3:59
4	Hiroshi Tanahashi defeated Yoshi-Hashi	Singles match for the G1 Climax tournament	18:41
5	Evil defeated Kenta	Singles match for the G1 Climax tournament	15:40
6	Sanada defeated Tetsuya Naito	Singles match for the G1 Climax tournament	27:08

==== Tournament scores ====
Rank	Wrestler	Result	Points	
Rank	Wrestler	Result	Pre	Post
1	Tetsuya Naito	Loss	6	6
1	Toru Yano	Loss	6	6
1	Juice Robinson	Win	4	6
2	Kenta	Loss	4	4
2	Zack Sabre Jr.	Win	2	4
2	Evil	Win	2	4
2	Hiroshi Tanahashi	Win	2	4
3	Hirooki Goto	Loss	2	2
3	Yoshi-Hashi	Loss	2	2
3	Sanada	Win	0	2

=== Night 9 (A Block) ===
The fifth night of A Block took place on October 5, 2020 at the Takamatsu City General Gymnasium in Takamatsu, Kagawa.

No.	Results	Stipulations	Times
1	Yuya Uemura defeated Gabriel Kidd by submission	Singles match	7:35
2	Shingo Takagi defeated Yujiro Takahashi	Singles match for the G1 Climax tournament	13:28
3	Jeff Cobb defeated Jay White	Singles match for the G1 Climax tournament	12:24
4	Kazuchika Okada defeated Minoru Suzuki	Singles match for the G1 Climax tournament	14:10
5	Tomohiro Ishii defeated Taichi	Singles match for the G1 Climax tournament	18:41
6	Kota Ibushi defeated Will Ospreay	Singles match for the G1 Climax tournament	15:56

==== Tournament scores ====
Rank	Wrestler	Result	Points	
Rank	Wrestler	Result	Pre	Post
1	Kota Ibushi	Win	6	8
2	Jay White	Loss	6	6
2	Will Ospreay	Loss	6	6
2	Taichi	Loss	6	6
2	Minoru Suzuki	Loss	6	6
2	Kazuchika Okada	Win	4	6
3	Jeff Cobb	Win	2	4
3	Shingo Takagi	Win	2	4
3	Tomohiro Ishii	Win	2	4
4	Yujiro Takahashi	Loss	0	0

=== Night 10 (B Block) ===
The fifth night of B Block took place on October 6, 2020 at the Hiroshima Sun Plaza in Nishi-ku, Hiroshima.

No.	Results	Stipulations	Times
1	Yota Tsuji vs. Yuya Uemura ended in a time limit draw	Singles match	15:00
2	Hirooki Goto defeated Toru Yano	Singles match for the G1 Climax tournament	0:18 (Note: This match broke the record for the shortest match in G1 Climax history; previously held by Kenzo Suzuki vs. Tadao Yasuda in the 2002 tournament, which lasted 37 seconds.)
3	Sanada defeated Zack Sabre Jr.	Singles match for the G1 Climax tournament	14:31
4	Evil defeated Juice Robinson	Singles match for the G1 Climax tournament	15:35
5	Tetsuya Naito defeated Yoshi-Hashi	Singles match for the G1 Climax tournament	24:43
6	Hiroshi Tanahashi defeated Kenta by submission	Singles match for the G1 Climax tournament	23:41

==== Tournament scores ====
Rank	Wrestler	Result	Points	
Rank	Wrestler	Result	Pre	Post
1	Tetsuya Naito	Win	6	8
2	Evil	Win	4	6
2	Hiroshi Tanahashi	Win	4	6
2	Toru Yano	Loss	6	6
2	Juice Robinson	Loss	6	6
3	Hirooki Goto	Win	2	4
3	Sanada	Win	2	4
3	Kenta	Loss	4	4
3	Zack Sabre Jr.	Loss	4	4
4	Yoshi-Hashi	Loss	2	2

=== Night 11 (A Block) ===
The sixth night of the A Block took place on October 7, 2020 at the Hiroshima Sun Plaza in Nishi-ku, Hiroshima.

No.	Results	Stipulations	Times
1	Yota Tsuji defeated Gabriel Kidd	Singles match	6:43
2	Tomohiro Ishii defeated Yujiro Takahashi	Singles match for the G1 Climax tournament	15:25
3	Kazuchika Okada defeated Jeff Cobb	Singles match for the G1 Climax tournament	11:03
4	Will Ospreay defeated Minoru Suzuki	Singles match for the G1 Climax tournament	14:26
5	Jay White defeated Taichi	Singles match for the G1 Climax tournament	15:16
6	Shingo Takagi defeated Kota Ibushi	Singles match for the G1 Climax tournament	21:56

==== Tournament scores ====
Colors
	Can still win the block			
	Cannot win the block regardless of future results			
Rank	Wrestler	Result	Points	
Rank	Wrestler	Result	Pre	Post
1	Kota Ibushi	Loss	8	8
1	Jay White	Win	6	8
1	Kazuchika Okada	Win	6	8
1	Will Ospreay	Win	6	8
2	Minoru Suzuki	Loss	6	6
2	Taichi	Loss	6	6
2	Shingo Takagi	Win	4	6
2	Tomohiro Ishii	Win	4	6
3	Jeff Cobb	Loss	4	4
4	Yujiro Takahashi	Loss	0	0

=== Night 12 (B Block) ===
The sixth night of the B Block took place on October 8, 2020 at Zip Arena Okayama in Okayama, Okayama.

No.	Results	Stipulations	Times
1	Gabriel Kidd defeated Yuya Uemura	Singles match	8:47
2	Hirooki Goto defeated Yoshi-Hashi	Singles match for the G1 Climax tournament	14:12
3	Zack Sabre Jr. defeated Toru Yano by submission	Singles match for the G1 Climax tournament	12:20
4	Sanada defeated Kenta	Singles match for the G1 Climax tournament	11:24
5	Tetsuya Naito defeated Juice Robinson	Singles match for the G1 Climax tournament	25:01
6	Evil defeated Hiroshi Tanahashi	Singles match for the G1 Climax tournament	19:58

==== Tournament scores ====
Colors
	Can still win the block			
	Cannot win the block regardless of future results			
Rank	Wrestler	Result	Points	
Rank	Wrestler	Result	Pre	Post
1	Tetsuya Naito	Win	8	10
2	Evil	Win	6	8
3	Hiroshi Tanahashi	Loss	6	6
3	Juice Robinson	Loss	6	6
3	Toru Yano	Loss	6	6
3	Hirooki Goto	Win	4	6
3	Sanada	Win	4	6
3	Zack Sabre Jr.	Win	4	6
4	Kenta	Loss	4	4
5	Yoshi-Hashi	Loss	2	2

=== Night 13 (A Block) ===
The seventh night of A Block took place on October 10, 2020 at the Osaka Prefectural Gymnasium in Namba, Osaka.

No.	Results	Stipulations	Times
1	Yuya Uemura defeated Yota Tsuji	Singles match	9:03
2	Jeff Cobb defeated Tomohiro Ishii	Singles match for the G1 Climax tournament	14:57
3	Jay White defeated Yujiro Takahashi	Singles match for the G1 Climax tournament	3:40
4	Will Ospreay defeated Taichi	Singles match for the G1 Climax tournament	16:26
5	Kota Ibushi defeated Minoru Suzuki	Singles match for the G1 Climax tournament	16:58
6	Kazuchika Okada defeated Shingo Takagi by referee stoppage	Singles match for the G1 Climax tournament	27:45

==== Tournament scores ====
Colors
	Can still win the block			
	Cannot win the block regardless of future results			
Rank	Wrestler	Result	Points	
Rank	Wrestler	Result	Pre	Post
1	Kota Ibushi	Win	8	10
1	Jay White	Win	8	10
1	Kazuchika Okada	Win	8	10
1	Will Ospreay	Win	8	10
2	Taichi	Loss	6	6
2	Shingo Takagi	Loss	6	6
2	Minoru Suzuki	Loss	6	6
2	Tomohiro Ishii	Loss	6	6
2	Jeff Cobb	Win	4	6
3	Yujiro Takahashi	Loss	0	0

=== Night 14 (B Block) ===
The seventh night of B Block took place on October 11, 2020 at the Aichi Prefectural Gymnasium in Nagoya, Aichi.

No.	Results	Stipulations	Times
1	Gabriel Kidd defeated Yota Tsuji	Singles match	7:09
2	Zack Sabre Jr. defeated Yoshi-Hashi by submission	Singles match for the G1 Climax tournament	13:34
3	Kenta defeated Toru Yano by count out	Singles match for the G1 Climax tournament	8:56
4	Sanada defeated Juice Robinson	Singles match for the G1 Climax tournament	15:06
5	Hirooki Goto defeated Hiroshi Tanahashi	Singles match for the G1 Climax tournament	13:38
6	Evil defeated Tetsuya Naito	Singles match for the G1 Climax tournament	23:57

==== Tournament scores ====
Colors
	Can still win the block			
	Cannot win the block regardless of future results			
Rank	Wrestler	Result	Points	
Rank	Wrestler	Result	Pre	Post
1	Evil	Win	8	10
1	Tetsuya Naito	Loss	10	10
2	Hirooki Goto	Win	6	8
2	Zack Sabre Jr.	Win	6	8
2	Sanada	Win	6	8
3	Toru Yano	Loss	6	6
3	Hiroshi Tanahashi	Loss	6	6
3	Juice Robinson	Loss	6	6
3	Kenta	Win	4	6
4	Yoshi-Hashi	Loss	2	2

=== Night 15 (A Block) ===
The eighth night of A Block took place on October 13, 2020 at the Hamamatsu Arena in Hamamatsu, Shizuoka.

No.	Results	Stipulations	Times
1	Yuya Uemura defeated Gabriel Kidd	Singles match	8:37
2	Jeff Cobb defeated Will Ospreay	Singles match for the G1 Climax tournament	12:21
3	Kota Ibushi defeated Yujiro Takahashi	Singles match for the G1 Climax tournament	12:28
4	Taichi defeated Shingo Takagi	Singles match for the G1 Climax tournament	16:21
5	Jay White defeated Minoru Suzuki	Singles match for the G1 Climax tournament	20:30
6	Kazuchika Okada defeated Tomohiro Ishii by referee stoppage	Singles match for the G1 Climax tournament	26:13

==== Tournament scores ====
Colors
	Can still win the block			
	Cannot win the block regardless of future results			
Rank	Wrestler	Result	Points	
Rank	Wrestler	Result	Pre	Post
1	Jay White	Win	10	12
1	Kota Ibushi	Win	10	12
1	Kazuchika Okada	Win	10	12
2	Will Ospreay	Loss	10	10
3	Taichi	Win	6	8
3	Jeff Cobb	Win	6	8
4	Minoru Suzuki	Loss	6	6
4	Tomohiro Ishii	Loss	6	6
4	Shingo Takagi	Loss	6	6
5	Yujiro Takahashi	Loss	0	0

=== Night 16 (B Block) ===
The eighth night of B Block took place on October 14, 2020 at the Yokohama Budokan in Kanagawa-ku, Yokohama.

No.	Results	Stipulations	Times
1	Yota Tsuji defeated Yuya Uemura by submission	Singles match	7:56
2	Kenta defeated Yoshi-Hashi by submission	Singles match for the G1 Climax tournament	17:39
3	Zack Sabre Jr. defeated Juice Robinson	Singles match for the G1 Climax tournament	14:30
4	Tetsuya Naito defeated Toru Yano	Singles match for the G1 Climax tournament	8:04
5	Evil defeated Hirooki Goto	Singles match for the G1 Climax tournament	15:33
6	Sanada defeated Hiroshi Tanahashi	Singles match for the G1 Climax tournament	28:25

==== Tournament scores ====
Colors
	Can still win the block			
	Cannot win the block regardless of future results			
Rank	Wrestler	Result	Points	
Rank	Wrestler	Result	Pre	Post
1	Evil	Win	10	12
1	Tetsuya Naito	Win	10	12
2	Sanada	Win	8	10
2	Zack Sabre Jr.	Win	8	10
3	Hirooki Goto	Loss	8	8
3	Kenta	Win	6	8
4	Hiroshi Tanahashi	Loss	6	6
4	Juice Robinson	Loss	6	6
4	Toru Yano	Loss	6	6
5	Yoshi-Hashi	Loss	2	2

=== Night 17 (A Block Final) ===
The ninth night of A Block took place on October 16, 2020 at the Ryogoku Kokugikan in Sumida, Tokyo. Kota Ibushi was declared the winner of A Block after Tomohiro Ishii pinned Jay White.

No.	Results	Stipulations	Times
1	Yota Tsuji defeated Gabriel Kidd by submission	Singles match	6:52
2	Yujiro Takahashi defeated Jeff Cobb	Singles match for the G1 Climax tournament	10:30
3	Shingo Takagi defeated Minoru Suzuki	Singles match for the G1 Climax tournament	12:29
4	Will Ospreay defeated Kazuchika Okada	Singles match for the G1 Climax tournament	17:04
5	Kota Ibushi defeated Taichi	Singles match for the G1 Climax tournament	17:12
6	Tomohiro Ishii defeated Jay White	Singles match for the G1 Climax tournament	24:35

==== Tournament scores ====
Colors
	Winner of the block			
	Did not win the block			
Rank	Wrestler	Result	Points	
Rank	Wrestler	Result	Pre	Post
1	Kota Ibushi	Win	12	14
2	Jay White	Loss	12	12
2	Will Ospreay	Win	10	12
2	Kazuchika Okada	Loss	12	12
3	Taichi	Loss	8	8
3	Jeff Cobb	Loss	8	8
3	Shingo Takagi	Win	6	8
3	Tomohiro Ishii	Win	6	8
4	Minoru Suzuki	Loss	6	6
5	Yujiro Takahashi	Win	0	2

=== Night 18 (B Block Final) ===
The ninth night of B Block will take place on October 17, 2020 at the Ryogoku Kokugikan in Sumida, Tokyo. Sanada was declared the winner of B Block after pinning Evil.

No.	Results	Stipulations	Times
1	Gabriel Kidd defeated Yuya Uemura	Singles match	8:16
2	Yoshi-Hashi defeated Toru Yano	Singles match for the G1 Climax tournament	6:10
3	Juice Robinson defeated Hirooki Goto	Singles match for the G1 Climax tournament	12:07
4	Hiroshi Tanahashi defeated Zack Sabre Jr.	Singles match for the G1 Climax tournament	12:01
5	Kenta defeated Tetsuya Naito	Singles match for the G1 Climax tournament	21:06
6	Sanada defeated Evil	Singles match for the G1 Climax tournament	27:01

==== Tournament scores ====
Colors
	Winner of the block			
	Did not win the block			
Rank	Wrestler	Result	Points	
Rank	Wrestler	Result	Pre	Post
1	Sanada	Win	10	12
2	Evil	Loss	12	12
2	Tetsuya Naito	Loss	12	12
3	Kenta	Win	8	10
3	Zack Sabre Jr.	Loss	10	10
4	Juice Robinson	Win	6	8
4	Hiroshi Tanahashi	Win	6	8
4	Hirooki Goto	Loss	8	8
5	Toru Yano	Loss	6	6
6	Yoshi-Hashi	Win	2	4

=== Night 19 (Final) ===
The final night took place on October 18, 2020 at the Ryogoku Kokugikan in Sumida, Tokyo. A Block winner Kota Ibushi defeated B Block winner Sanada to be declared the winner of the tournament.

No.	Results	Stipulations	Times
1	Suzuki-gun (Taichi, Zack Sabre Jr., Douki and El Desperado) defeated Chaos (Toru Yano, Tomohiro Ishii, Yoshi-Hashi and Hirooki Goto)	Eight-man tag team match	10:34
2	Los Ingobernables de Japón (Hiromu Takahashi and Shingo Takagi) defeated Suzuki-gun (Minoru Suzuki and Yoshinobu Kanemaru)	Tag team match	11:54
3	Taguchi Japan (Master Wato, Jeff Cobb, Juice Robinson and Hiroshi Tanahashi) defeated Bullet Club (Jay White, Kenta, Gedo and Taiji Ishimori)	Eight-man tag team match	9:12
4	Will Ospreay and Great-O-Khan defeated Chaos (Sho and Kazuchika Okada)	Tag team match	12:36
5	Bullet Club (Yujiro Takahashi and Evil) defeated Los Ingobernables de Japón (Bushi and Tetsuya Naito)	Tag team match	14:14
6	Kota Ibushi defeated Sanada	Singles match for the G1 Climax tournament final	35:12

== Participants ==
Final standings
Block A		Block B	
Kota Ibushi	14	Sanada	12
Will Ospreay	12	Evil	12
Jay White	12	Tetsuya Naito	12
Kazuchika Okada	12	Kenta	10
Taichi	8	Zack Sabre Jr.	10
Jeff Cobb	8	Hirooki Goto	8
Tomohiro Ishii	8	Hiroshi Tanahashi	8
Shingo Takagi	8	Juice Robinson	8
Minoru Suzuki	6	Toru Yano	6
Yujiro Takahashi	2	Yoshi-Hashi	4

Tournament overview
Block A	Ibushi	Cobb	Okada	Ishii	Ospreay	Takagi	Suzuki	Taichi	White	Takahashi
Ibushi	—N/a	Ibushi (10:43)	Ibushi (21:35)	Ibushi (15:41)	Ibushi (15:56)	Takagi (21:56)	Ibushi (16:58)	Ibushi (17:12)	White (20:28)	Ibushi (12:28)
Cobb	Ibushi (10:43)	—N/a	Okada (11:03)	Cobb (14:57)	Cobb (12:21)	Cobb (11:44)	Suzuki (9:24)	Taichi (12:47)	Cobb (12:24)	Takahashi (10:30)
Okada	Ibushi (21:35)	Okada (11:03)	—N/a	Okada (26:13)	Ospreay (17:04)	Okada (27:45)	Okada (14:10)	Okada (17:03)	White (18:48)	Okada (12:01)
Ishii	Ibushi (15:41)	Cobb (14:57)	Okada (26:13)	—N/a	Ospreay (18:20)	Ishii (26:01)	Suzuki (13:00)	Ishii (18:41)	Ishii (24:35)	Ishii (15:25)
Ospreay	Ibushi (15:56)	Cobb (12:21)	Ospreay (17:04)	Ospreay (18:20)	—N/a	Takagi (22:03)	Ospreay (14:26)	Ospreay (16:26)	Ospreay (18:46)	Ospreay (7:34)
Takagi	Takagi (21:56)	Cobb (11:44)	Okada (27:45)	Ishii (26:01)	Takagi (22:03)	—N/a	Takagi (12:29)	Taichi (16:21)	White (19:28)	Takagi (13:38)
Suzuki	Ibushi (16:28)	Suzuki (9:24)	Okada (14:10)	Suzuki (13:00)	Ospreay (14:26)	Takagi (12:29)	—N/a	Taichi (12:11)	White (20:30)	Suzuki (7:53)
Taichi	Ibushi (17:12)	Taichi (12:47)	Okada (17:03)	Ishii (18:41)	Ospreay (16:26)	Taichi (16:21)	Taichi (12:11)	—N/a	White (15:16)	Taichi (11:03)
White	White (20:28)	Cobb (12:24)	White (18:48)	Ishii (24:35)	Ospreay (18:46)	White (19:28)	White (20:30)	White (15:16)	—N/a	White (3:40)
Takahashi	Ibushi (12:28)	Takahashi (10:30)	Okada (12:01)	Ishii (15:25)	Ospreay (7:34)	Takagi (13:38)	Suzuki (7:53)	Taichi (11:03)	White (3:40)	—N/a
Block B	Tanahashi	Robinson	Goto	Yano	Yoshi-Hashi	Naito	Sanada	Sabre	Kenta	Evil
Tanahashi	—N/a	Tanahashi (14:16)	Goto (13:38)	Yano (7:15)	Tanahashi (18:41)	Naito (27:16)	Sanada (28:25)	Tanahashi (12:01)	Tanahashi (23:41)	Evil (19:58)
Robinson	Tanahashi (14:16)	—N/a	Robinson (12:07)	Robinson (6:42)	Robinson (15:57)	Naito (25:01)	Sanada (15:06)	Sabre (14:30)	Robinson (17:01)	Evil (15:35)
Goto	Goto (13:38)	Robinson (12:07)	—N/a	Goto (0:18)	Goto (14:12)	Naito (21:58)	Goto (11:03)	Sabre (3:59)	Kenta (17:15)	Evil (15:33)
Yano	Yano (7:15)	Robinson (6:42)	Goto (0:18)	—N/a	Yoshi-Hashi (6:10)	Naito (8:04)	Yano (6:16)	Sabre (12:20)	Kenta (8:56)	Yano (4:33)
Yoshi-Hashi	Tanahashi (18:41)	Robinson (15:57)	Goto (14:12)	Yoshi-Hashi (6:10)	—N/a	Naito (24:43)	Yoshi-Hashi (15:15)	Sabre (13:34)	Kenta (17:39)	Evil (17:21)
Naito	Naito (27:16)	Naito (25:01)	Naito (21:58)	Naito (8:04)	Naito (24:43)	—N/a	Sanada (27:08)	Naito (28:28)	Kenta (21:06)	Evil (23:57)
Sanada	Sanada (28:25)	Sanada (15:06)	Goto (11:03)	Yano (6:16)	Yoshi-Hashi (15:15)	Sanada (27:08)	—N/a	Sanada (14:31)	Sanada (11:24)	Sanada (27:01)
Sabre	Tanahashi (12:01)	Sabre (14:30)	Sabre (3:59)	Sabre (12:20)	Sabre (13:34)	Naito (28:28)	Sanada (14:31)	—N/a	Kenta (15:46)	Sabre (14:54)
Kenta	Tanahashi (23:41)	Robinson (17:01)	Kenta (17:15)	Kenta (8:56)	Kenta (17:36)	Kenta (21:06)	Sanada (11:24)	Kenta (15:46)	—N/a	Evil (15:40)
Evil	Evil (19:58)	Evil (15:35)	Evil (15:33)	Yano (4:33)	Evil (17:21)	Evil (23:57)	Sanada (27:01)	Sabre (14:54)	Evil (15:40)	—N/a

Final
A1	Kota Ibushi	Pin (Note: Ibushi became the first wrestler to win back to back G1 Climax tournaments since Hiroyoshi Tenzan in 2003 and 2004.)
B1	Sanada	35:12

== Aftermath ==
On night 17, during the match between Kazuchika Okada and Will Ospreay, Bea Priestley, Ospreay's girlfriend, made her debut appearance in NJPW, at ringside. As Okada locked his Money Clip submission onto Ospreay, Priestley attempted to enter the ring, distracting the referee in the process, allowing Tomoyuki Oka to make his return to the company as Great O-Kharn (later changed to Great O-Khan, in reference to Genghis Khan of the Mongol Empire), attacking Okada with an Eliminator, helping earn the victory for Ospreay. Afterwards, Ospreay turned heel on Okada by attacking him after the match from behind with his Hidden Blade elbow. In a backstage interview, Ospreay announced that he would officially leave Chaos to start a new faction with him, Priestley, and O-Khan called The Empire (later changed to United Empire).

On November 7, 2020, Kota Ibushi unsuccessfully defended his briefcase, being the first man to do so, by losing it to Jay White at Power Struggle.
