= G1 Climax 29 =

2019 edition of the G1 Climax

- Logo of the 2019 G1 Climax
- Promotion: New Japan Pro-Wrestling
- Date: July 6 to August 12, 2019
- City: See venues
- Venue: See venues
- Attendance: 97,191 (combined)

Event chronology
← Previous; Dominion 6.9 in Osaka-jo Hall; Southern Showdown	Next → Super J-Cup; Royal Quest

G1 Climax chronology
← Previous; G1 Climax 28	Next → G1 Climax 30

G1 Climax 29
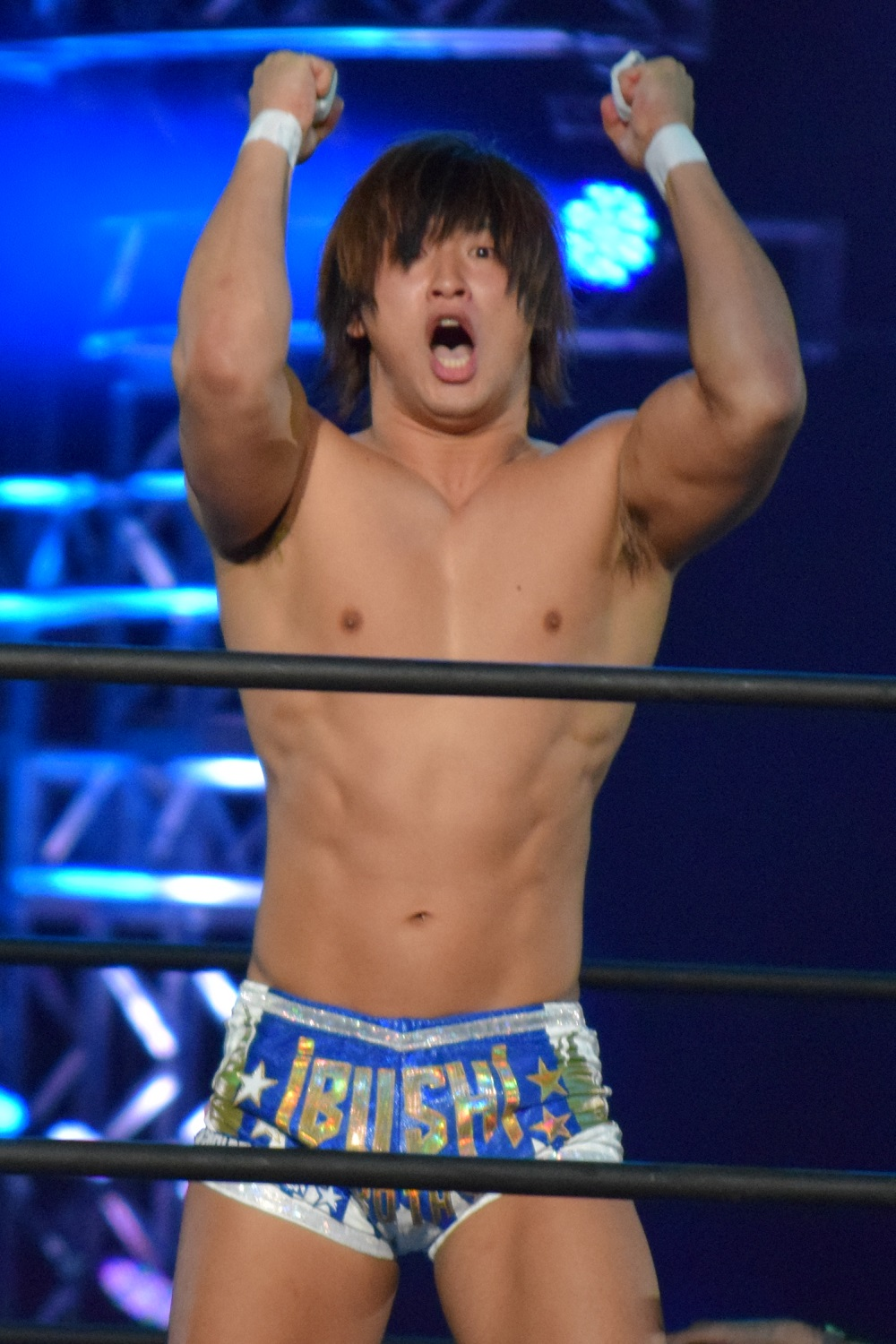
- Kota Ibushi, winner of G1 Climax 29

Tournament information
- Sport: Professional wrestling
- Location: Japan; United States
- Dates: July 6, 2019–August 12, 2019
- Tournament format: Two-block round-robin tournament
- Participants: 20

Final positions
- Champion: Kota Ibushi
- Runner-up: Jay White

Tournament statistics
- Bouts fought: 91

The G1 Climax 29 was a professional wrestling tournament promoted by the Japan-based New Japan Pro-Wrestling (NJPW). The tournament commenced on July 6 and concluded on August 12, 2019. It is the twenty-ninth edition of G1 Climax, and forty-fifth edition of the tournament counting its previous forms under different names. A Block winner Kota Ibushi defeated B Block winner Jay White in the final to win the tournament.

Considered NJPW's most important tournament, the G1 Climax features twenty wrestlers, divided in two blocks of ten ("A" and "B"). Each participant faces all nine other wrestlers within the same block in singles matches. The winner of each block is determined via a point system, with two points for a win, one point for a draw, and no point for a defeat; each night of the event sees the ten members of one block compete for the tournament, while the members of the non-competing block perform in tag team matches that have no influence of the tournament results. On the final day of the event, the winners of both blocks face each other to determine the winner of the G1 Climax, who will gain a future match for the IWGP Heavyweight Championship at Wrestle Kingdom, NJPW's biggest yearly event.

The event saw the G1 Climax debut of Jeff Cobb, Jon Moxley, Taichi, Kenta, Shingo Takagi, and Will Ospreay as well as Lance Archer's first participation since 2014; this was Kenta's in-ring debut in NJPW. As usual, the tournament took place over several cities and locations; the 2019 edition marked the first time that the G1 Climax tournament took place outside of Japan, as the event opened with G1 Climax in Dallas at the American Airlines Center in Dallas, before moving back to Japan. The event was broadcast live on AXS TV in the United States, TV Asahi and Fighting TV Samurai in Japan, and New Japan Pro-Wrestling World worldwide.

== Production ==
Other on-screen personnel
Role:	Name:
English Commentators	Kevin Kelly
English Commentators	Rocky Romero
English Commentators	Chris Charlton (nights 2, 3, 5─7, 13, 14, 16─19)
Japanese Commentators	Shinpei Nogami (nights 18 & 19)
Japanese Commentators	Shigeki Kiyono (nights 2, 3, 8─10)
Japanese Commentators	Yohei Onishi (nights 1 & 4)
Japanese Commentators	Shunichiro Fujisawa (nights 5─7, 12, 15)
Japanese Commentators	Haruo Murata (nights 11, 13, 14, 16)
Japanese Commentators	Shinji Yoshino (night 17)
Japanese Commentators	Milano Collection A.T.
Japanese Commentators	Miki Motoi (nights 1, 3, 5, 15, 18)
Japanese Commentators	Yusuke Okamoto (nights 7 & 12)
Japanese Commentators	Katsuhiko Kanazawa (nights 4, 6, 19)
Japanese Commentators	Soichi Shibata (night 2)
Japanese Commentators	Kazuo Yamazaki (night 17)
Ring announcers	Kimihiko Ozaki
Ring announcers	Makoto Abe
Referees	Kenta Sato
Referees	Marty Asami
Referees	Red Shoes Unno
Referees	Tiger Hattori

=== Tournament rules ===
NJPW announced that the 2019 edition and its dates of the G1 Climax on January 4, 2019, at Wrestle Kingdom 13; it was announced that the first night of the tournament will be held at the American Airlines Center in Dallas, marking the first time the tournament would be held outside of Japan. As per usual G1 Climax tradition, the tournament features twenty wrestlers, divided in two blocks of ten ("A" and "B"). Each participant faces all nine other wrestler within the same block in singles match, with the winner of each block being determined via a point system, gaining two points for a win, one point for a draw, and no point for a loss; each night of the event sees the ten members of a same block compete for the tournament, while the members of the non-competing block perform in tag team matches that have no influence of the tournament results, typically facing their future tournament opponents. In case of several wrestler sharing the top score, the results of the matches those wrestlers had when facing each other's in the tournament act as tiebreaker, with the one having the most wins over the other top-scorers determining the winner of the block.

On the final day of the event, the respective winners of both blocks face each other to determine the winner of the G1 Climax, who would gain a future match for the IWGP Heavyweight Championship, NJPW's top championship, at Wrestle Kingdom, NJPW's biggest yearly event; if the IWGP Heavyweight Champion himself wins, he gets to pick his opponent at Wrestle Kingdom. The low-card matches have a twenty-minutes time limit, while the matches of the tournament have a 30-minutes time limit (with the time limit being reached resulting in a tie); the final match between the two block winners has no time limit.

=== Storylines ===
The event includes matches that result from scripted storylines, where wrestlers portray heroes, villains, or less distinguishable characters in scripted events that build tension and culminate in a wrestling match or series of matches.

First-time participant Jeff Cobb and returning participant Tomohiro Ishii announced their participation to the tournament on May 31, 2019.

On June 9, 2019, at Dominion 6.9 in Osaka-jo Hall, several wrestlers announced their decision to participate in the G1 Climax for the first time, including IWGP United States Champion Jon Moxley. Best of the Super Juniors winner Will Ospreay, immediately after defeating Dragon Lee to win the IWGP Junior heavyweight Champion, also announced his intention to participate, marking a rare participation to the tournament by a member of the Junior Heavyweight division. Junior Heavyweight Shingo Takagi, who defeated heavyweight Satoshi Kojima at Dominion, announced his move to the Heavyweight division after the match, as well as his participation to the G1 Climax. Kenta, who had been released by WWE the previous February, made his surprise NJPW debut at the event, also announcing his participation in the G1 Climax.

Four time-participant Lance Archer, who had last participated to the tournament in 2014, announced his participation on June 10, 2019, via the company's official YouTube channel.

The twenty participants were officially announced on June 16, 2019. The list included six first-time participants, namely Cobb, Moxley, Ospreay, Takagi, Kenta, and Taichi, with fourteen participants returning from the previous year, and Archer returning after a five-year hiatus; participants from the previous year who did not return were Michael Elgin, Kenny Omega and Hangman Page, who had left NJPW, and Minoru Suzuki, Tama Tonga, Togi Makabe, and Yoshi-Hashi.

=== Venues ===
Dates	Venue	Location	Country
July 6	American Airlines Center	Dallas, Texas	United States
July 13–14	Ota City General Gymnasium	Ōta, Tokyo	Japan
July 15	Hokkaido Prefectural Sports Center	Toyohira-ku, Sapporo	Japan
July 18–20	Korakuen Hall	Bunkyo, Tokyo	Japan
July 24	Hiroshima Sun Plaza	Nishi-ku, Hiroshima	Japan
July 27–28	Aichi Prefectural Gymnasium	Nagoya	Japan
July 30	Takamatsu City General Gymnasium	Takamatsu, Kagawa	Japan
August 1	Fukuoka Citizens Gymnasium	Fukuoka, Fukuoka	Japan
August 3–4	Osaka Prefectural Gymnasium	Namba, Osaka	Japan
August 7	Hamamatsu Arena	Hamamatsu, Shizuoka	Japan
August 8	Yokohama Cultural Gymnasium	Naka-ku, Yokohama	Japan
August 10–12	Nippon Budokan	Chiyoda, Tokyo	Japan

== Results ==
=== Night 1 (A Block) ===
G1 Climax in Dallas
- Promotion: New Japan Pro-Wrestling
- Date: July 6, 2019
- City: Dallas, Texas, U.S.
- Venue: American Airlines Center
- Attendance: 4,846

Event chronology
← Previous; Southern Showdown	Next → G1 Climax 29

G1 Special chronology
← Previous; G1 Special in San Francisco	Next → TBA

The first night of A Block took place on July 6, 2019, at the American Airlines Center in Dallas, Texas; it was promoted as G1 Climax in Dallas. It marked the first time that a night of the G1 Climax took place outside of Japan. This event was broadcast live on AXS TV in the United States and New Japan Pro-Wrestling World. The show would receive coverage from more mainstream publications such as Sports Illustrated and Deadspin.

No.	Results	Stipulations	Times
1	Guerrillas of Destiny (Tama Tonga and Tanga Loa) defeated Roppongi 3K (Sho and Yoh)	Tag team match	6:42
2	Ren Narita and Jeff Cobb defeated Shota Umino and Tomohiro Ishii	Tag team match	7:18
3	Chaos (Hirooki Goto and Yoshi-Hashi) defeated Bullet Club (Chase Owens and Jay White)	Tag team match	8:38
4	Jushin Thunder Liger, Juice Robinson and Toru Yano defeated Los Ingobernables de Japón (Bushi, Shingo Takagi and Tetsuya Naito)	Six-man tag team match	8:18
5	Lance Archer defeated Will Ospreay	Singles match for the G1 Climax tournament	18:16
6	Bad Luck Fale defeated Evil	Singles match for the G1 Climax tournament	11:33
7	Sanada defeated Zack Sabre Jr.	Singles match for the G1 Climax tournament	21:12
8	Kenta defeated Kota Ibushi	Singles match for the G1 Climax tournament	20:51
9	Kazuchika Okada defeated Hiroshi Tanahashi	Singles match for the G1 Climax tournament	22:04

==== Tournament scores ====
Rank	Wrestler	Result	Points	
Rank	Wrestler	Result	Pre	Post
1	Bad Luck Fale	Win	0	2
1	Kazuchika Okada	Win	0	2
1	Kenta	Win	0	2
1	Lance Archer	Win	0	2
1	Sanada	Win	0	2
2	Evil	Loss	0	0
2	Hiroshi Tanahashi	Loss	0	0
2	Kota Ibushi	Loss	0	0
2	Will Ospreay	Loss	0	0
2	Zack Sabre Jr.	Loss	0	0

=== Night 2 (B Block) ===
The first night of B Block took place on July 13, 2019, at the Ota City General Gymnasium in Ōta, Tokyo.

No.	Results	Stipulations	Times
1	Los Ingobernables de Japón (Evil, Sanada and Bushi) defeated Kota Ibushi, Will Ospreay and Yuya Uemura	Six-man tag team match	7:59
2	Bullet Club (Chase Owens and Bad Luck Fale) defeated Suzuki-gun (Lance Archer and Yoshinobu Kanemaru)	Tag team match	5:59
3	Kenta, Clark Connors and Karl Fredericks defeated Hiroshi Tanahashi, Shota Umino and Ren Narita by submission	Six-man tag team match	11:13
4	Suzuki-gun (Zack Sabre Jr. and Minoru Suzuki) defeated Chaos (Kazuchika Okada and Yoshi-Hashi) by submission	Tag team match	11:16
5	Juice Robinson defeated Shingo Takagi	Singles match for the G1 Climax tournament	14:41
6	Jon Moxley defeated Taichi	Singles match for the G1 Climax tournament	7:36
7	Toru Yano defeated Tetsuya Naito	Singles match for the G1 Climax tournament	3:42
8	Tomohiro Ishii defeated Jeff Cobb	Singles match for the G1 Climax tournament	18:33
9	Hirooki Goto defeated Jay White	Singles match for the G1 Climax tournament	21:06

==== Tournament scores ====
Rank	Wrestler	Result	Points	
Rank	Wrestler	Result	Pre	Post
1	Hirooki Goto	Win	0	2
1	Jon Moxley	Win	0	2
1	Juice Robinson	Win	0	2
1	Tomohiro Ishii	Win	0	2
1	Toru Yano	Win	0	2
2	Jay White	Loss	0	0
2	Jeff Cobb	Loss	0	0
2	Shingo Takagi	Loss	0	0
2	Taichi	Loss	0	0
2	Tetsuya Naito	Loss	0	0

=== Night 3 (A Block) ===
The second night of A Block took place on July 14, 2019, at the Ota City General Gymnasium in Ōta, Tokyo.

No.	Results	Stipulations	Times
1	Taguchi Japan (Juice Robinson and Toa Henare) and Yota Tsuji defeated Hirooki Goto, Tomoaki Honma and Yuya Uemura	Six-man tag team match	6:31
2	Jeff Cobb and Ren Narita defeated Jon Moxley and Shota Umino	Tag team match	4:53
3	Chaos (Tomohiro Ishii, Toru Yano and Yoshi-Hashi) defeated Bullet Club (Jay White, Yujiro Takahashi and Chase Owens)	Six-man tag team match	9:23
4	Suzuki-gun (Taichi, Minoru Suzuki and Yoshinobu Kanemaru) defeated Los Ingobernables de Japón (Tetsuya Naito, Shingo Takagi and Bushi)	Six-man tag team match	8:33
5	Lance Archer defeated Bad Luck Fale	Singles match for the G1 Climax tournament	10:12
6	Will Ospreay defeated Sanada	Singles match for the G1 Climax tournament	17:06
7	Kazuchika Okada defeated Zack Sabre Jr.	Singles match for the G1 Climax tournament	12:01
8	Evil defeated Kota Ibushi	Singles match for the G1 Climax tournament	19:11
9	Kenta defeated Hiroshi Tanahashi	Singles match for the G1 Climax tournament	18:35

==== Tournament scores ====
Rank	Wrestler	Result	Points	
Rank	Wrestler	Result	Pre	Post
1	Kazuchika Okada	Win	2	4
1	Kenta	Win	2	4
1	Lance Archer	Win	2	4
2	Bad Luck Fale	Loss	2	2
2	Evil	Win	0	2
2	Sanada	Loss	2	2
2	Will Ospreay	Win	0	2
3	Hiroshi Tanahashi	Loss	0	0
3	Kota Ibushi	Loss	0	0
3	Zack Sabre Jr.	Loss	0	0

=== Night 4 (B Block) ===
The second night of B Block took place on July 15, 2019, at the Hokkaido Prefectural Sports Center in Toyohira-ku, Sapporo.

No.	Results	Stipulations	Times
1	Kota Ibushi and Jushin Thunder Liger defeated Shota Umino and Yota Tsuji by submission	Tag team match	8:19
2	Los Ingobernables de Japón (Evil, Sanada and Bushi) defeated Taguchi Japan (Tomoaki Honma and Toa Henare) and Ren Narita	Six-man tag team match	7:18
3	Suzuki-gun (Zack Sabre Jr., Lance Archer, Minoru Suzuki and Yoshinobu Kanemaru defeated Hiroshi Tanahashi, Kenta, Clark Connors and Karl Fredericks	Eight-man tag team match	11:23
4	Chaos (Kazuchika Okada and Yoshi-Hashi) defeated Bullet Club (Bad Luck Fale and Chase Owens	Tag team match	8:43
5	Shingo Takagi defeated Toru Yano	Singles match for the G1 Climax tournament	6:16
6	Juice Robinson defeated Hirooki Goto	Singles match for the G1 Climax tournament	12:23
7	Jon Moxley defeated Jeff Cobb	Singles match for the G1 Climax tournament	8:54
8	Tomohiro Ishii defeated Jay White	Singles match for the G1 Climax tournament	19:13
9	Taichi defeated Tetsuya Naito	Singles match for the G1 Climax tournament	21:01

==== Tournament scores ====
Rank	Wrestler	Result	Points	
Rank	Wrestler	Result	Pre	Post
1	Jon Moxley	Win	2	4
1	Juice Robinson	Win	2	4
1	Tomohiro Ishii	Win	2	4
2	Hirooki Goto	Loss	2	2
2	Shingo Takagi	Win	0	2
2	Taichi	Win	0	2
2	Toru Yano	Loss	2	2
3	Jay White	Loss	0	0
3	Jeff Cobb	Loss	0	0
3	Tetsuya Naito	Loss	0	0

=== Night 5 (A Block) ===
The third night of A Block took place on July 18, 2019, at the Korakuen Hall in Bunkyo, Tokyo.

No.	Results	Stipulations	Times
1	Jon Moxley and Shota Umino defeated Tomohiro Ishii and Yuya Uemura	Tag team match	5:46
2	Jeff Cobb and Chaos (Hirooki Goto and Yoshi-Hashi) defeated Taguchi Japan (Juice Robinson and Toa Henare) and Yota Tsuji by submission	Tag team match	9:30
3	Bullet Club (Jay White, Yujiro Takahashi and Chase Owens) defeated Taguchi Japan (Toru Yano and Tomoaki Honma) and Ren Narita	Six-man tag team match	8:49
4	Suzuki-gun (Taichi, Minoru Suzuki and Yoshinobu Kanemaru) defeated Los Ingobernables de Japón (Shingo Takagi, Tetsuya Naito and Bushi)	Six-man tag team match	8:35
5	Kenta defeated Lance Archer	Singles match for the G1 Climax tournament	11:58
6	Evil defeated Sanada	Singles match for the G1 Climax tournament	18:11
7	Kazuchika Okada defeated Bad Luck Fale	Singles match for the G1 Climax tournament	10:15
8	Hiroshi Tanahashi defeated Zack Sabre Jr.	Singles match for the G1 Climax tournament	13:56
9	Kota Ibushi defeated Will Ospreay	Singles match for the G1 Climax tournament	27:16

==== Tournament scores ====
Rank	Wrestler	Result	Points	
Rank	Wrestler	Result	Pre	Post
1	Kazuchika Okada	Win	4	6
1	Kenta	Win	4	6
2	Evil	Win	2	4
2	Lance Archer	Loss	4	4
3	Bad Luck Fale	Loss	2	2
3	Hiroshi Tanahashi	Win	0	2
3	Kota Ibushi	Win	0	2
3	Sanada	Loss	2	2
3	Will Ospreay	Loss	2	2
4	Zack Sabre Jr.	Loss	0	0

=== Night 6 (B Block) ===
The third night of B Block took place on July 19, 2019, at the Korakuen Hall in Bunkyo, Tokyo.

No.	Results	Stipulations	Times
1	Bullet Club (Bad Luck Fale and Chase Owens) defeated Suzuki-gun (Zack Sabre Jr. and Yoshinobu Kanemaru)	Tag team match	4:40
2	Suzuki-gun (Lance Archer and Minoru Suzuki) defeated Hiroshi Tanahashi and Tomoaki Honma	Tag team match	9:48
3	Los Ingobernables de Japón (Sanada, Evil and Bushi) defeated Kota Ibushi, Kenta and Clark Connors	Six-man tag team match	9:02
4	Chaos (Kazuchika Okada and Yoshi-Hashi) defeated Will Ospreay and Toa Henare	Tag team match	8:46
5	Shingo Takagi defeated Taichi	Singles match for the G1 Climax tournament	14:40
6	Jeff Cobb defeated Juice Robinson	Singles match for the G1 Climax tournament	13:21
7	Toru Yano defeated Jay White	Singles match for the G1 Climax tournament	3:04
8	Tetsuya Naito defeated Hirooki Goto	Singles match for the G1 Climax tournament	16:01
9	Jon Moxley defeated Tomohiro Ishii	Singles match for the G1 Climax tournament	20:36

==== Tournament scores ====
Rank	Wrestler	Result	Points	
Rank	Wrestler	Result	Pre	Post
1	Jon Moxley	Win	4	6
2	Juice Robinson	Loss	4	4
2	Shingo Takagi	Win	2	4
2	Tomohiro Ishii	Loss	4	4
2	Toru Yano	Win	2	4
3	Hirooki Goto	Loss	2	2
3	Jeff Cobb	Win	0	2
3	Taichi	Loss	2	2
3	Tetsuya Naito	Win	0	2
4	Jay White	Loss	0	0

=== Night 7 (A Block) ===
The fourth night of A Block took place on July 20, 2019, at the Korakuen Hall in Bunkyo, Tokyo.

No.	Results	Stipulations	Times
1	Jon Moxley and Shota Umino defeated Juice Robinson and Yota Tsuji by submission	Tag team match	3:56
2	Suzuki-gun (Taichi, Minoru Suzuki and Yoshinobu Kanemaru defeated Chaos (Hirooki Goto and Toru Yano) and Yuya Uemura	Six-man tag team match	8:52
3	Bullet Club (Jay White, Yujiro Takahashi and Chase Owens) defeated Taguchi Japan (Jeff Cobb, Tomoaki Honma and Toa Henare)	Six-man tag team match	9:50
4	Los Ingobernables de Japón (Tetsuya Naito, Shingo Takagi and Bushi) defeated Chaos (Tomohiro Ishii and Yoshi-Hashi) and Ren Narita	Six-man tag team match	7:33
5	Zack Sabre Jr. defeated Bad Luck Fale by countout	Singles match for the G1 Climax tournament	6:30
6	Hiroshi Tanahashi defeated Lance Archer	Singles match for the G1 Climax tournament	11:58
7	Kenta defeated Evil	Singles match for the G1 Climax tournament	15:03
8	Kota Ibushi defeated Sanada	Singles match for the G1 Climax tournament	19:14
9	Kazuchika Okada defeated Will Ospreay	Singles match for the G1 Climax tournament	21:56

==== Tournament scores ====
Rank	Wrestler	Result	Points	
Rank	Wrestler	Result	Pre	Post
1	Kazuchika Okada	Win	6	8
1	Kenta	Win	6	8
2	Evil	Loss	4	4
2	Hiroshi Tanahashi	Win	2	4
2	Kota Ibushi	Win	2	4
2	Lance Archer	Loss	4	4
3	Bad Luck Fale	Loss	2	2
3	Sanada	Loss	2	2
3	Will Ospreay	Loss	2	2
3	Zack Sabre Jr.	Win	0	2

=== Night 8 (B Block) ===
The fourth night of B Block took place on July 24, 2019, at the Hiroshima Sun Plaza in Nishi-ku, Hiroshima.

No.	Results	Stipulations	Times
1	Bullet Club (Bad Luck Fale, Yujiro Takahashi and Chase Owens) defeated Will Ospreay, Tomoaki Honma and Yuya Uemura	Six-man tag team match	9:20
2	Suzuki-gun (Zack Sabre Jr., Lance Archer and Minoru Suzuki) defeated Los Ingobernables de Japón (Evil, Sanada and Bushi)	Six-man tag team match	8:09
3	Hiroshi Tanahashi and Shota Umino defeated Kota Ibushi and Ren Narita	Tag team match	7:45
4	Chaos (Kazuchika Okada and Yoshi-Hashi) and Toa Henare defeated Kenta, Clark Connors and Karl Fredericks by submission	Six-man tag team match	8:51
5	Juice Robinson defeated Toru Yano	Singles match for the G1 Climax tournament	4:28
6	Taichi defeated Hirooki Goto	Singles match for the G1 Climax tournament	12:11
7	Jon Moxley defeated Shingo Takagi by submission	Singles match for the G1 Climax tournament	14:45
8	Jay White defeated Jeff Cobb	Singles match for the G1 Climax tournament	15:50
9	Tetsuya Naito defeated Tomohiro Ishii	Singles match for the G1 Climax tournament	18:58

==== Tournament scores ====
Rank	Wrestler	Result	Points	
Rank	Wrestler	Result	Pre	Post
1	Jon Moxley	Win	6	8
2	Juice Robinson	Win	4	6
3	Shingo Takagi	Loss	4	4
3	Taichi	Win	2	4
3	Tetsuya Naito	Win	2	4
3	Tomohiro Ishii	Loss	4	4
3	Toru Yano	Loss	4	4
4	Hirooki Goto	Loss	2	2
4	Jeff Cobb	Loss	2	2
4	Jay White	Win	0	2

=== Night 9 (A Block) ===
The fifth night of A Block took place on July 27, 2019, at the Aichi Prefectural Gymnasium in Nagoya.

No.	Results	Stipulations	Times
1	Suzuki-gun (Yoshinobu Kanemaru, Minoru Suzuki and Taichi) defeated Yota Tsuji, Ren Narita and Jeff Cobb	Six-man tag team match	8:46
2	Bullet Club (Chase Owens, Yujiro Takahashi and Jay White) defeated Taguchi Japan (Toa Henare, Tomoaki Honma and Juice Robinson)	Six-man tag team match	8:09
3	Chaos (Tomohiro Ishii and Toru Yano) defeated Chaos (Hirooki Goto and Yoshi-Hashi)	Tag team match	7:15
4	Los Ingobernables de Japón (Shingo Takagi and Tetsuya Naito) defeated Jon Moxley and Shota Umino	Tag team match	7:50
5	Kota Ibushi defeated Lance Archer	Singles match for the G1 Climax tournament	11:42
6	Will Ospreay defeated Bad Luck Fale by disqualification	Singles match for the G1 Climax tournament	9:08
7	Evil defeated Zack Sabre Jr.	Singles match for the G1 Climax tournament	16:00
8	Hiroshi Tanahashi defeated Sanada	Singles match for the G1 Climax tournament	18:07
9	Kazuchika Okada defeated Kenta	Singles match for the G1 Climax tournament	26:53

==== Tournament scores ====
Rank	Wrestler	Result	Points	
Rank	Wrestler	Result	Pre	Post
1	Kazuchika Okada	Win	8	10
2	Kenta	Loss	8	8
3	Evil	Win	4	6
3	Kota Ibushi	Win	4	6
3	Hiroshi Tanahashi	Win	4	6
4	Lance Archer	Loss	4	4
4	Will Ospreay	Win	2	4
5	Bad Luck Fale	Loss	2	2
5	Sanada	Loss	2	2
5	Zack Sabre Jr.	Loss	2	2

=== Night 10 (B Block) ===
The fifth night of B Block took place on July 28, 2019, at the Aichi Prefectural Gymnasium in Nagoya.

No.	Results	Stipulations	Times
1	Ren Narita defeated Yuya Uemura	Singles match	7:25
2	Bullet Club (Chase Owens, Yujiro Takahashi and Bad Luck Fale) defeated Taguchi Japan (Tomoaki Honma and Toa Henare) and Kota Ibushi	Six-man tag team match	8:20
3	Suzuki-gun (Yoshinobu Kanemaru, Minoru Suzuki, Zack Sabre Jr. and Lance Archer) defeated Shota Umino, Chaos (Yoshi-Hashi, Will Ospreay and Kazuchika Okada)	Eight-man tag team match	9:35
4	Los Ingobernables de Japón (Bushi, Sanada and Evil) defeated Karl Fredericks, Kenta, Hiroshi Tanahashi	Six-man tag team match	8:59
5	Hirooki Goto defeated Toru Yano	Singles match for the G1 Climax tournament	1:42
6	Tomohiro Ishii defeated Juice Robinson	Singles match for the G1 Climax tournament	17:54
7	Jeff Cobb defeated Taichi	Singles match for the G1 Climax tournament	12:30
8	Jay White defeated Shingo Takagi	Singles match for the G1 Climax tournament	19:26
9	Jon Moxley defeated Tetsuya Naito	Singles match for the G1 Climax tournament	16:41

==== Tournament scores ====
Rank	Wrestler	Result	Points	
Rank	Wrestler	Result	Pre	Post
1	Jon Moxley	Win	8	10
2	Juice Robinson	Loss	6	6
2	Tomohiro Ishii	Win	4	6
3	Jeff Cobb	Win	2	4
3	Hirooki Goto	Win	2	4
3	Tetsuya Naito	Loss	4	4
3	Taichi	Loss	4	4
3	Shingo Takagi	Loss	4	4
3	Jay White	Win	2	4
3	Toru Yano	Loss	4	4

=== Night 11 (A Block) ===
The sixth night of A Block took place on July 30, 2019, at the Takamatsu City General Gymnasium Arena 1 in Kagawa.

No.	Results	Stipulations	Times
1	Chaos (Yoshi-Hashi and Hirooki Goto) and Yota Tsuji defeated Yuya Uemura, Tomoaki Honma and Tomohiro Ishii	Six-man tag team match	9:24
2	Toru Yano and Ren Narita defeated Shota Umino and Jon Moxley	Tag team match	4:08
3	Bullet Club (Chase Owens, Yujiro Takahashi and Jay White) defeated Suzuki-gun (Yoshinobu Kanemaru, Minoru Suzuki and Taichi)	Six-man tag team match	7:39
4	Los Ingobernables de Japón (Bushi, Shingo Takagi and Tetsuya Naito) defeated Taguchi Japan (Toa Henare, Jeff Cobb and Juice Robinson)	Six-man tag team match	9:27
5	Kota Ibushi defeated Bad Luck Fale	Singles match for the G1 Climax tournament	9:27
6	Zack Sabre Jr. defeated Will Ospreay by submission	Singles match for the G1 Climax tournament	20:02
7	Kazuchika Okada defeated Lance Archer	Singles match for the G1 Climax tournament	14:15
8	Sanada defeated Kenta	Singles match for the G1 Climax tournament	16:10
9	Hiroshi Tanahashi defeated Evil	Singles match for the G1 Climax tournament	23:02

==== Tournament scores ====
Rank	Wrestler	Result	Points	
Rank	Wrestler	Result	Pre	Post
1	Kazuchika Okada	Win	10	12
2	Kenta	Loss	8	8
2	Kota Ibushi	Win	6	8
2	Hiroshi Tanahashi	Win	6	8
3	Evil	Loss	6	6
4	Lance Archer	Loss	4	4
4	Will Ospreay	Loss	4	4
4	Sanada	Win	2	4
4	Zack Sabre Jr.	Win	2	4
5	Bad Luck Fale	Loss	2	2

=== Night 12 (B Block) ===
The sixth night of B Block took place on August 1, 2019, at the Fukuoka Citizen Gymnasium in Fukuoka.

No.	Results	Stipulations	Times
1	Bullet Club (Bad Luck Fale, Chase Owens and Yujiro Takahashi) defeated Clark Connors, Karl Fredericks and Kenta	Six-man tag team match	8:11
2	Suzuki-gun (Minoru Suzuki and Zack Sabre Jr.) defeated Suzuki-gun (Lance Archer and Yoshinobu Kanemaru)	Tag team match	5:00
3	Kota Ibushi and Taguchi Japan (Toa Henare and Tomoaki Honma) defeated Hiroshi Tanahashi, Ren Narita and Shota Umino	Six-man tag team match	8:18
4	Chaos (Kazuchika Okada, Will Ospreay and Yoshi-Hashi) defeated Los Ingobernables de Japón (Bushi, Evil and Sanada)	Six-man tag team match	9:14
5	Jeff Cobb defeated Shingo Takagi	Singles match for the G1 Climax tournament	12:27
6	Toru Yano defeated Jon Moxley by countout	Singles match for the G1 Climax tournament	5:08
7	Tetsuya Naito defeated Juice Robinson	Singles match for the G1 Climax tournament	13:47
8	Jay White defeated Taichi	Singles match for the G1 Climax tournament	15:07
9	Hirooki Goto defeated Tomohiro Ishii	Singles match for the G1 Climax tournament	18:01

==== Tournament scores ====
Rank	Wrestler	Result	Points	
Rank	Wrestler	Result	Pre	Post
1	Jon Moxley	Loss	10	10
2
2	Juice Robinson	Loss	6	6
2	Tomohiro Ishii	Loss	6	6
2	Jay White	Win	4	6
2	Jeff Cobb	Win	4	6
2	Hirooki Goto	Win	4	6
2	Tetsuya Naito	Win	4	6
2	Toru Yano	Win	4	6
3	Taichi	Loss	4	4
3	Shingo Takagi	Loss	4	4

=== Night 13 (A Block) ===
The seventh night of A Block took place on August 3, 2019, at the Osaka Prefectural Gymnasium in Namba, Osaka.

No.	Results	Stipulations	Times
1	Taguchi Japan (Juice Robinson and Toa Henare) defeated Ren Narita and Yota Tsuji	Tag team match	6:18
2	Chaos (Hirooki Goto, Tomohiro Ishii and Yoshi-Hashi) defeated Taguchi Japan (Jeff Cobb, Tomoaki Honma and Toru Yano)	Six-man tag team match	5:50
3	Los Ingobernables de Japón (Bushi, Shingo Takagi and Tetsuya Naito defeated Suzuki-gun (Minoru Suzuki, Taichi and Yoshinobu Kanemaru)	Six-man tag team match	7:28
4	Bullet Club (Chase Owens and Jay White) defeated Jon Moxley and Shota Umino	Tag team match	5:55
5	Bad Luck Fale defeated Kenta	Singles match for the G1 Climax tournament	7:20
6	Zack Sabre Jr. defeated Lance Archer	Singles match for the G1 Climax tournament	10:43
7	Evil defeated Will Ospreay	Singles match for the G1 Climax tournament	17:08
8	Kota Ibushi defeated Hiroshi Tanahashi	Singles match for the G1 Climax tournament	15:53
9	Sanada defeated Kazuchika Okada	Singles match for the G1 Climax tournament	29:47

==== Tournament scores ====
Rank	Wrestler	Result	Points	
Rank	Wrestler	Result	Pre	Post
1	Kazuchika Okada	Loss	12	12
2	Kota Ibushi	Win	8	10
3	Evil	Win	6	8
3	Kenta	Loss	8	8
3	Hiroshi Tanahashi	Loss	8	8
4	Sanada	Win	4	6
4	Zack Sabre Jr.	Win	4	6
5	Lance Archer	Loss	4	4
5	Will Ospreay	Loss	4	4
5	Bad Luck Fale	Win	2	4

=== Night 14 (B Block) ===
The seventh night of B Block took place on August 4, 2019, at the Osaka Prefectural Gymnasium in Namba, Osaka.

No.	Results	Stipulations	Times
1	Toa Henare and Yuya Uemura defeated Ren Narita and Shota Umino	Tag team match	6:06
2	Suzuki-gun (Lance Archer, Minoru Suzuki and Zack Sabre Jr.) defeated Los Ingobernables de Japón (Bushi, Evil and Sanada	Six-man tag team match	6:38
3	Bullet Club (Bad Luck Fale, Chase Owens and Yujiro Takahashi) defeated Kota Ibushi, Hiroshi Tanahashi and Tomoaki Honma	Six-man tag team match	8:16
4	Chaos (Kazuchika Okada, Will Ospreay and Yoshi-Hashi) defeated Clark Connors, Karl Fredericks and Kenta	Six-man tag team match	8:24
5	Tomohiro Ishii defeated Toru Yano	Singles match for the G1 Climax tournament	9:36
6	Taichi defeated Juice Robinson	Singles match for the G1 Climax tournament	12:28
7	Hirooki Goto defeated Jeff Cobb	Singles match for the G1 Climax tournament	11:20
8	Jay White defeated Jon Moxley	Singles match for the G1 Climax tournament	15:15
9	Tetsuya Naito defeated Shingo Takagi	Singles match for the G1 Climax tournament	27:15

==== Tournament scores ====
Rank	Wrestler	Result	Points	
Rank	Wrestler	Result	Pre	Post
1	Jon Moxley	Loss	10	10
2	Hirooki Goto	Win	6	8
2	Tetsuya Naito	Win	6	8
2	Tomohiro Ishii	Win	6	8
2	Jay White	Win	6	8
3	Juice Robinson	Loss	6	6
3	Toru Yano	Loss	4	6
3	Jeff Cobb	Loss	6	6
3	Taichi	Win	4	6
4	Shingo Takagi	Loss	4	4

=== Night 15 (A Block) ===
The eighth night of A Block took place on August 7, 2019, at the Hamamatsu Arena in Higashi-ku, Hamamatsu.

No.	Results	Stipulations	Times
1	Suzuki-gun (Minoru Suzuki, Taichi and Yoshinobu Kanemaru) defeated Toru Yano, Yota Tsuji and Yuya Uemura	Six-man tag team match	8:56
2	Chaos (Hirooki Goto and Yoshi-Hashi) defeated Jon Moxley and Shota Umino	Tag team match	5:09
3	Bullet Club (Chase Owens, Jay White and Yujiro Takahashi) defeated Taguchi Japan (Juice Robinson, Toa Henare and Tomoaki Honma)	Six-man tag team match	9:31
4	Los Ingobernables de Japón (Bushi, Tetsuya Naito and Shingo Takagi defeated Jeff Cobb, Ren Narita and Tomohiro Ishii	Six-man tag team match	8:50
5	Sanada defeated Lance Archer	Singles match for the G1 Climax tournament	10:28
6	Bad Luck Fale defeated Hiroshi Tanahashi	Singles match for the G1 Climax tournament	9:58
7	Will Ospreay defeated Kenta	Singles match for the G1 Climax tournament	16:33
8	Kota Ibushi defeated Zack Sabre Jr.	Singles match for the G1 Climax tournament	15:46
9	Kazuchika Okada defeated Evil	Singles match for the G1 Climax tournament	27:00

==== Tournament scores ====
Rank	Wrestler	Result	Points	
Rank	Wrestler	Result	Pre	Post
1	Kazuchika Okada	Win	12	14
2	Kota Ibushi	Win	10	12
3	Evil	Loss	8	8
3	Kenta	Loss	8	8
3	Hiroshi Tanahashi	Loss	8	8
3	Sanada	Win	6	8
4	Bad Luck Fale	Win	4	6
4	Will Ospreay	Win	4	6
4	Zack Sabre Jr.	Loss	6	6
5	Lance Archer	Loss	4	4

=== Night 16 (B Block) ===
The eighth night of B Block took place on August 8, 2019, at the Yokohama Cultural Gymnasium in Naka-ku, Yokohama.

No.	Results	Stipulations	Times
1	Ren Narita and Shota Umino defeated Yuya Uemura and Yota Tsuji	Tag team match	5:39
2	Bullet Club (Bad Luck Fale, Chase Owens and Yujiro Takahashi) defeated Los Ingobernables de Japón (Bushi, Evil and Sanada)	Six-man tag team match	7:50
3	Suzuki-gun (Lance Archer, Minoru Suzuki and Zack Sabre Jr.) defeated Clark Connors, Karl Fredericks and Kenta	Six-man tag team match	7:17
4	Chaos (Kazuchika Okada and Yoshi-Hashi) and Hiroshi Tanahashi defeated Kota Ibushi, Toa Henare and Will Ospreay	Six-man tag team match	7:20
5	Toru Yano defeated Taichi by countout	Singles match for the G1 Climax tournament	5:04
6	Tetsuya Naito defeated Jeff Cobb	Singles match for the G1 Climax tournament	12:47
7	Hirooki Goto defeated Jon Moxley	Singles match for the G1 Climax tournament	8:38
8	Jay White defeated Juice Robinson	Singles match for the G1 Climax tournament	23:01
9	Shingo Takagi defeated Tomohiro Ishii	Singles match for the G1 Climax tournament	22:41

==== Tournament scores ====
Rank	Wrestler	Result	Points	
Rank	Wrestler	Result	Pre	Post
1	Jon Moxley	Loss	10	10
1	Hirooki Goto	Win	8	10
1	Jay White	Win	8	10
1	Tetsuya Naito	Win	8	10
2	Tomohiro Ishii	Loss	8	8
2	Toru Yano	Win	6	8
3	Jeff Cobb	Loss	6	6
3	Juice Robinson	Loss	6	6
3	Taichi	Loss	6	6
3	Shingo Takagi	Win	4	6

=== Night 17 (A Block) ===
The ninth night of A Block took place on August 10, 2019, at the Nippon Budokan in Chiyoda, Tokyo and saw the finals of the A Block. Kota Ibushi defeated Kazuchika Okada to be declared the winner of the A Block.

No.	Results	Stipulations	Times
1	Jon Moxley and Shota Umino defeated Juice Robinson and Ren Narita	Tag team match	3:41
2	Taguchi Japan (Jeff Cobb and Toa Henare) defeated Taguchi Japan (Tomoaki Honma and Toru Yano)	Tag team match	5:23
3	Suzuki-gun (Minoru Suzuki, Taichi and Yoshinobu Kanemaru) defeated Chaos (Hirooki Goto, Tomohiro Ishii and Yoshi-Hashi)	Six-man tag team match	7:50
4	Los Ingobernables de Japón (Bushi, Tetsuya Naito and Shingo Takagi) defeated Bullet Club (Chase Owens, Jay White and Yujiro Takahashi)	Six-man tag team match	8:37
5	Lance Archer defeated Evil	Singles match for the G1 Climax tournament	10:02
6	Bad Luck Fale defeated Sanada	Singles match for the G1 Climax tournament	10:38
7	Zack Sabre Jr. defeated Kenta	Singles match for the G1 Climax tournament	16:26
8	Will Ospreay defeated Hiroshi Tanahashi	Singles match for the G1 Climax tournament	17:12
9	Kota Ibushi defeated Kazuchika Okada	Singles match for the G1 Climax tournament	25:07

==== Tournament scores ====
Rank	Wrestler	Result	Points	
Rank	Wrestler	Result	Pre	Post
1	Kota Ibushi	Win	12	14
2	Kazuchika Okada	Loss	14	14
3	Bad Luck Fale	Win	6	8
3	Will Ospreay	Win	6	8
3	Zack Sabre Jr.	Win	6	8
3	Evil	Loss	8	8
3	Kenta	Loss	8	8
3	Hiroshi Tanahashi	Loss	8	8
3	Sanada	Loss	8	8
4	Lance Archer	Win	4	6

=== Night 18 (B Block) ===
The ninth night of B Block took place on August 11, 2019, at the Nippon Budokan in Chiyoda, Tokyo and saw the finals of the B Block. Jay White defeated Tetsuya Naito to be declared the winner of the B Block.

No.	Results	Stipulations	Times
1	Ren Narita and Shota Umino defeated Yuya Uemura and Yota Tsuji	Tag team match	7:34
2	Bullet Club (Bad Luck Fale, Chase Owens and Yujiro Takahashi) defeated Los Ingobernables de Japón (Bushi, Evil and Sanada)	Six-man tag team match	7:54
3	Kota Ibushi, Toa Henare and Tomoaki Honma defeated Clark Connors, Karl Fredericks and Kenta	Six-man tag team match	8:22
4	Chaos (Kazuchika Okada, Will Ospreay and Yoshi-Hashi) and Hiroshi Tanahashi defeated Suzuki-gun (Lance Archer, Minoru Suzuki, Yoshinobu Kanemaru and Zack Sabre Jr.)	Eight-man tag team match	10:35
5	Jeff Cobb defeated Toru Yano	Singles match for the G1 Climax tournament	5:19
6	Taichi defeated Tomohiro Ishii	Singles match for the G1 Climax tournament	11:56
7	Juice Robinson defeated Jon Moxley	Singles match for the G1 Climax tournament	16:26
8	Shingo Takagi defeated Hirooki Goto	Singles match for the G1 Climax tournament	15:10
9	Jay White defeated Tetsuya Naito	Singles match for the G1 Climax tournament	18:51

==== Tournament scores ====
Rank	Wrestler	Result	Points	
Rank	Wrestler	Result	Pre	Post
1	Jay White	Win	10	12
2	Jon Moxley	Loss	10	10
2	Hirooki Goto	Loss	10	10
2	Tetsuya Naito	Loss	10	10
3	Tomohiro Ishii	Loss	8	8
3	Toru Yano	Loss	8	8
3	Jeff Cobb	Win	6	8
3	Juice Robinson	Win	6	8
3	Taichi	Win	6	8
3	Shingo Takagi	Win	6	8

=== Night 19 (Final) ===
The final night took place on August 12, 2019, at the Nippon Budokan in Chiyoda, Tokyo. A Block winner Kota Ibushi defeated B Block winner Jay White to be declared the winner of the tournament.

No.	Results	Stipulations	Times
1	Clark Connors and Karl Fredericks defeated Ren Narita and Yota Tsuji	Tag team match	9:53
2	Taguchi Japan (Jeff Cobb and Jushin Thunder Liger) and Tiger Mask IV defeated Suzuki-gun (Lance Archer, Taichi and Yoshinobu Kanemaru)	Six-man tag team match	7:36
3	Chaos (Sho, Will Ospreay and Yoh) defeated Bullet Club (Chase Owens, Taiji Ishimori and Yujiro Takahashi	Six-man tag team match	7:57
4	Taguchi Japan (Juice Robinson and Toa Henare) defeated Jon Moxley and Shota Umino	Tag team match	6:19
5	Los Ingobernables de Japón (Bushi, Evil, Sanada, Shingo Takagi and Tetsuya Naito) defeated Taguchi Japan (Ryusuke Taguchi, Togi Makabe, Tomoaki Honma and Toru Yano) and Hirooki Goto	Ten-man tag team match	8:56
6	Bullet Club (Bad Luck Fale, Tama Tonga and Tanga Loa) defeated Chaos (Tomohiro Ishii and Yoshi-Hashi) and Kenta	Six-man tag team match	8:35
7	Suzuki-gun (Minoru Suzuki and Zack Sabre Jr.) defeated Hiroshi Tanahashi and Kazuchika Okada	Tag team match	15:27
8	Kota Ibushi defeated Jay White	Singles match for the G1 Climax tournament final	31:01

=== Final standings ===
Block A		Block B	
Kota Ibushi	14	Jay White	12
Kazuchika Okada	14	Hirooki Goto	10
Will Ospreay	8	Jon Moxley	10
Bad Luck Fale	8	Tetsuya Naito	10
Hiroshi Tanahashi	8	Jeff Cobb	8
Evil	8	Shingo Takagi	8
Zack Sabre Jr.	8	Tomohiro Ishii	8
Sanada	8	Taichi	8
Kenta	8	Juice Robinson	8
Lance Archer	6	Toru Yano	8

=== Tournament overview ===
Block A	Archer	Evil	Fale	Ibushi	Kenta	Okada	Ospreay	Sabre	Sanada	Tanahashi
Archer	—N/a	Archer (10:02)	Archer (10:12)	Ibushi (11:42)	Kenta (11:58)	Okada (14:15)	Archer (18:16)	Sabre (10:43)	Sanada (10:28)	Tanahashi (11:58)
Evil	Archer (10:02)	—N/a	Fale (11:33)	Evil (19:11)	Kenta (15:03)	Okada (27:00)	Evil (17:08)	Evil (16:00)	Evil (18:11)	Tanahashi (23:02)
Fale	Archer (10:12)	Fale (11:33)	—N/a	Ibushi (9:27)	Fale (7:20)	Okada (10:15)	Ospreay (9:08)	Sabre (6:30)	Fale (10:38)	Fale (9:58)
Ibushi	Ibushi (11:42)	Evil (19:11)	Ibushi (9:27)	—N/a	Kenta (20:51)	Ibushi (25:07)	Ibushi (27:16)	Ibushi (15:46)	Ibushi (19:14)	Ibushi (15:53)
Kenta	Kenta (11:58)	Kenta (15:03)	Fale (7:20)	Kenta (20:51)	—N/a	Okada (26:53)	Ospreay (16:33)	Sabre (16:26)	Sanada (16:10)	Kenta (18:35)
Okada	Okada (14:15)	Okada (27:00)	Okada (10:15)	Ibushi (25:07)	Okada (26:53)	—N/a	Okada (21:56)	Okada (12:01)	Sanada (29:47)	Okada (22:04)
Ospreay	Archer (18:16)	Evil (17:08)	Ospreay (9:08)	Ibushi (27:16)	Ospreay (16:33)	Okada (21:56)	—N/a	Sabre (20:02)	Ospreay (17:06)	Ospreay (17:12)
Sabre	Sabre (10:43)	Evil (16:00)	Sabre (6:30)	Ibushi (15:46)	Sabre (16:26)	Okada (12:01)	Sabre (20:02)	—N/a	Sanada (21:12)	Tanahashi (13:56)
Sanada	Sanada (10:28)	Evil (18:11)	Fale (10:38)	Ibushi (19:14)	Sanada (16:10)	Sanada (29:47)	Ospreay (17:06)	Sanada (21:12)	—N/a	Tanahashi (18:07)
Tanahashi	Tanahashi (11:58)	Tanahashi (23:02)	Fale (9:58)	Ibushi (15:53)	Kenta (18:35)	Okada (22:04)	Ospreay (17:12)	Tanahashi (13:56)	Tanahashi (18:07)	—N/a
Block B	Cobb	Goto	Ishii	Moxley	Naito	Robinson	Taichi	Takagi	White	Yano
Cobb	—N/a	Goto (11:20)	Ishii (18:33)	Moxley (8:54)	Naito (12:47)	Cobb (13:21)	Cobb (12:30)	Cobb (12:27)	White (15:50)	Cobb (5:16)
Goto	Goto (11:20)	—N/a	Goto (18:01)	Goto (8:38)	Naito (16:01)	Robinson (12:23)	Taichi (12:11)	Takagi (15:10)	Goto (21:06)	Goto (1:42)
Ishii	Ishii (18:33)	Goto (18:01)	—N/a	Moxley (20:36)	Naito (18:58)	Ishii (17:54)	Taichi (11:56)	Takagi (22:41)	Ishii (19:13)	Ishii (9:36)
Moxley	Moxley (8:54)	Goto (8:38)	Moxley (20:36)	—N/a	Moxley (16:41)	Robinson (16:26)	Moxley (7:36)	Moxley (14:45)	White (15:15)	Yano (5:08)
Naito	Naito (12:47)	Naito (16:01)	Naito (18:58)	Moxley (16:41)	—N/a	Naito (13:47)	Taichi (21:01)	Naito (27:15)	White (18:51)	Yano (3:42)
Robinson	Cobb (13:21)	Robinson (12:23)	Ishii (17:54)	Robinson (16:26)	Naito (13:47)	—N/a	Taichi (12:27)	Robinson (14:41)	White (23:01)	Robinson (4:28)
Taichi	Cobb (12:30)	Taichi (12:11)	Taichi (11:56)	Moxley (7:36)	Taichi (21:01)	Taichi (12:27)	—N/a	Takagi (14:40)	White (15:07)	Yano (5:04)
Takagi	Cobb (12:27)	Takagi (15:10)	Takagi (22:41)	Moxley (14:45)	Naito (27:15)	Robinson (14:41)	Takagi (14:40)	—N/a	White (19:26)	Takagi (6:16)
White	White (15:50)	Goto (21:06)	Ishii (19:13)	White (15:15)	White (18:51)	White (23:01)	White (15:07)	White (19:26)	—N/a	Yano (3:04)
Yano	Cobb (5:16)	Goto (1:42)	Ishii (9:36)	Yano (5:08)	Yano (3:42)	Robinson (4:28)	Yano (5:04)	Takagi (6:16)	Yano (3:04)	—N/a

Final
A1	Kota Ibushi	Pin
B1	Jay White	31:01

== Reception ==
Between nights 7 and 8, Deadspin noted how the 2019 G1 Climax offered an excellent platform for Jon Moxley to shine following his departure from WWE; they notably singled out his match against Tomohiro Ishii, calling it "almost certainly Moxley’s best singles match ever, under any name, but it felt significant in another sense. It was good, brutal fun to watch, but it also pointed a way forward for Moxley not just as an attraction, but rather as a brilliant and brilliantly violent wrestler." Many of the tournament's matches were acclaimed, with eight of them attaining a rating of five or more stars by wrestling journalist Dave Meltzer.
