= Kota Ibushi =

Japanese professional wrestler

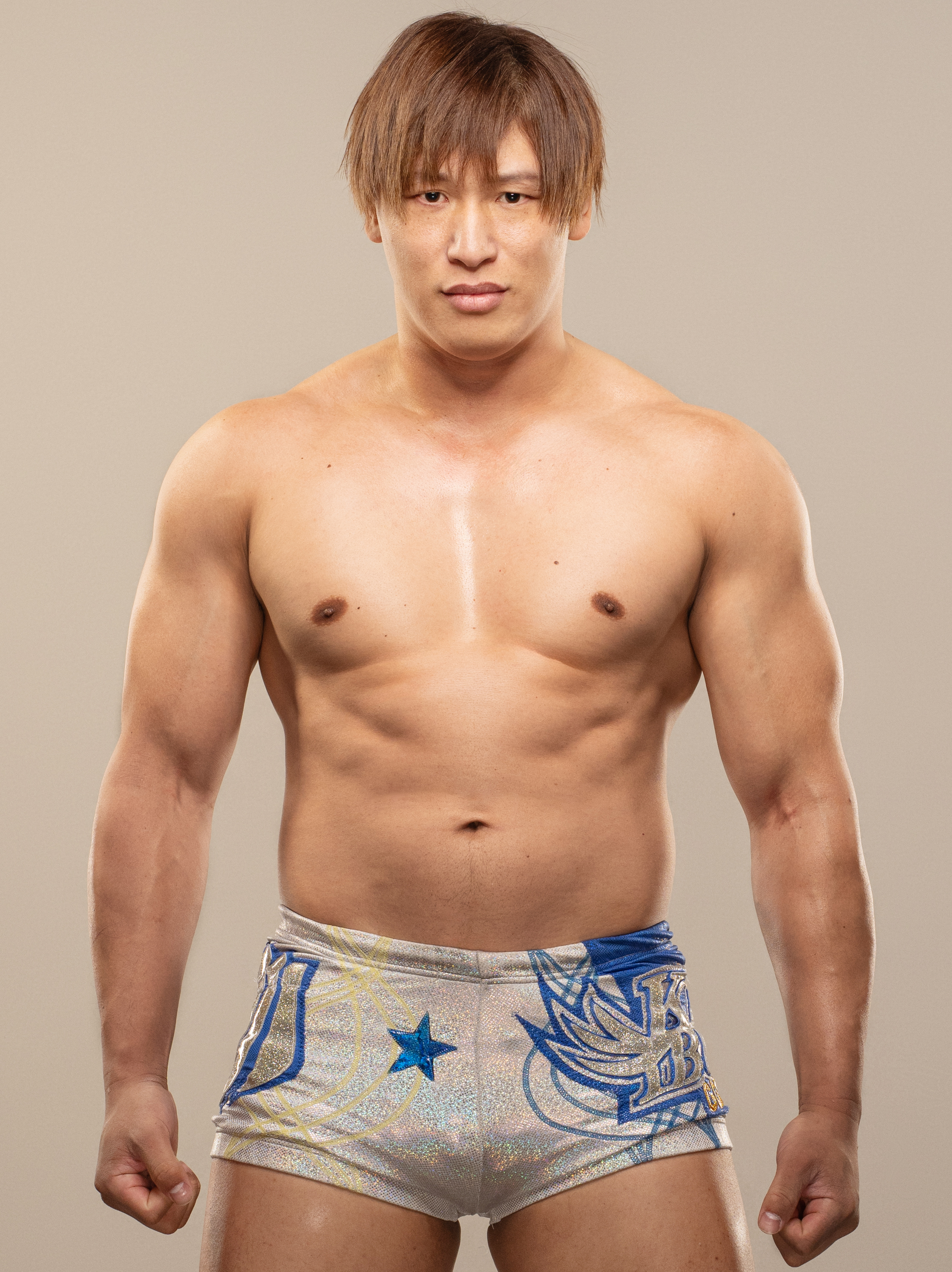
- Ibushi in 2023

Personal information
- Born: May 21, 1982 (age 44) Aira, Kagoshima, Japan

Professional wrestling career
- Ring name(s): Kota Ibushi; Hustle Kamen Orange; Oda Nobunaga; Robin Mask; Sammy Lee Jr. Tiger Mask W
- Billed height: 1.81 m (5 ft 11 in)
- Billed weight: 93 kg (205 lb)
- Billed from: Kagoshima Prefecture
- Trained by: Kyohei Mikami; Shuji Kondo
- Debut: July 1, 2004

Kota Ibushi (飯伏幸太, Ibushi Kōta; born May 21, 1982) is a Japanese professional wrestler and martial artist. He is signed to All Elite Wrestling (AEW), where he is currently inactive due to a broken femur, suffered during the October 11, 2025 AEW Collision taping.

Ibushi began his career with DDT Pro-Wrestling (DDT) in 2004. Over the next 11 years, he became a three-time KO-D Openweight Champion, five-time KO-D Tag Team Champion, and two-time KO-D 6-Man Tag Team Champion. Two of his KO-D Tag Team title reigns were with Kenny Omega as the Golden☆Lovers, and their combined total of 351 days is still a DDT record.

In 2009, Ibushi started working for New Japan Pro-Wrestling (NJPW) and eventually signed with them in 2013. In NJPW, he is a one-time NEVER Openweight Champion, three-time IWGP Junior Heavyweight Champion, and a one-time IWGP Junior Heavyweight Tag Team Champion. He resigned from both DDT and NJPW in February 2016 and has performed in several different organizations as a freelancer, including both DDT and NJPW. He also participated in WWE's 2016 Cruiserweight Classic tournament.

After continuing to perform as a freelancer for NJPW after 2016 (including as Tiger Mask W from 2016 to 2017), Ibushi signed a new full-time contract with NJPW in 2019, winning the IWGP Heavyweight Championship for the first and only time in his career in 2021. he later unified it with the IWGP Intercontinental Championship to become the inaugural IWGP World Heavyweight Champion. He is also a former IWGP Tag Team Champion. He has won several tournaments for NJPW, including the 2011 Best of the Super Juniors, the 2015 New Japan Cup, and the 2019 and 2020 editions of the G1 Climax; he is the only wrestler to have won all three tournaments. He is also one of only four wrestlers to win two consecutive G1 Climax tournaments, alongside Masahiro Chono, Hiroyoshi Tenzan, and Kazuchika Okada, as well as the only wrestler to reach the final stage of four consecutive G1 Climax tournaments.

== Early life ==
Kota Ibushi was born in Aira, Kagoshima, on May 21, 1982.

== Professional wrestling career ==
=== DDT Pro-Wrestling ===
==== Early career (2004–2009) ====
Ibushi was trained by Kyohei Mikami and Shuji Kondo. He made his debut for DDT Pro-Wrestling (DDT) on July 1, 2004 at Audience 2004 losing to Kudo. In 2005, he won his first championship, when he and Daichi Kakimoto defeated Darkside Hero! and Toru Owashi to win the KO-D Tag Team Championship. On June 25, 2006, he lost to Danshoku Dino in a match for the championship and spent most of later 2006 competing in multiple tag team matches. In 2007 Ibushi's fortunes fared better and he began to win more matches, including defeating BxB Hulk at a co-promoted event held by DDT and Dragon Gate. Later in 2007, Ibushi defeated Madoka to win the vacant Independent World Junior Heavyweight Championship. In February 2008, Ibushi defeated Thanomsak Toba to retain the Independent World Junior Heavyweight Championship and win the Ironman Heavymetalweight Championship. He would go on to lose the Ironman championship to Dino. On July 20, 2008, Ibushi would defeat Kudo in the Next KO-D Openweight Championship One Day Tournament finals but would ultimately lose to the KO-D champion Dick Togo a month later.

==== Golden☆Lovers and departure (2009–2016) ====
Ibushi would start teaming up with Kenny Omega as the "Golden☆Lovers" and on January 24, 2009, they defeated Harashima and Toru Owashi to win the KO-D Tag Team Championship and lost them in May to Dick Togo and Taka Michinoku. In the summer of 2009, Ibushi won the first KO-D Openweight Championship Contendership Tournament and went on to win the KO-D Openweight Championship from Harashima. During his time as champion he also won the Ironman Heavymetalweight Championship and would lose the Openweight Championship to Shuji Ishikawa. After winning the Best of the Super Juniors in New Japan Pro-Wrestling (NJPW) his matches in DDT were mostly tag team matches with Omega or matches involving the IWGP Junior Heavyweight Tag Team Championship. In 2011, Ibushi teamed up with Danshoku Dino to win the KO-D Tag Team Championship, however after dislocating his shoulder he vacated the title.

Ibushi made his return at a DDT event on May 4, 2012, losing to El Generico. On June 24, Ibushi defeated Yuji Hino to win DDT's KO-D Openweight Championship for the second time. On August 18, Ibushi defeated Omega in the main event of Budokan Peter Pan to retain the KO-D Openweight Championship. On September 30, Ibushi lost the title to El Generico. On October 3, Ibushi won the third annual DDT48 general election and, as a result, earned an immediate rematch with El Generico. Ibushi received his rematch on October 21, but was again defeated by El Generico. On May 26, 2013, Ibushi, Gota Ihashi and Omega defeated the Monster Army (Antonio Honda, Daisuke Sasaki and Yuji Hino) to win the KO-D 6-Man Tag Team Championship. Their reign lasted 28 days, before they lost the title back to the Monster Army, now represented by Honda, Hino and Hoshitango. On August 18 at DDT's annual Ryōgoku Peter Pan event, Ibushi faced New Japan representative and reigning IWGP Heavyweight Champion Kazuchika Okada in a losing effort in a special non-title match. On January 26, 2014, Ibushi and Kenny Omega defeated Yankee Nichokenju (Isami Kodaka and Yuko Miyamoto) and Konosuke Takeshita and Tetsuya Endo in a three-way match to win the KO-D Tag Team Championship. On April 12, Ibushi and Omega became double champions in DDT, when they teamed with Daisuke Sasaki to defeat Team Dream Futures (Keisuke Ishii, Shigehiro Irie and Soma Takao) for the KO-D 6-Man Tag Team Championship. Their reign, however, lasted only 22 days, before they lost the title to Shuten-dōji (Kudo, Masa Takanashi and Yukio Sakaguchi) on May 4. On September 28, Ibushi and Omega lost the KO-D Tag Team Championship to Konosuke Takeshita and Tetsuya Endo. On February 15, 2015, Ibushi won the KO-D Openweight Championship for the third time, defeating Harashima. He lost the title back to Harashima on April 29. On August 23, Ibushi won the KO-D Tag Team Championship for the fifth time, when he and Daisuke Sasaki defeated Daisuke Sekimoto and Yuji Okabayashi for the title. They vacated the title on November 2, when Ibushi was sidelined indefinitely with a cervical disc herniation.

On February 21, 2016, Ibushi announced his resignation from DDT.

=== Independent circuit (2004–2010) ===
Ibushi competed in Wrestling Marvelous Future teaming with Onryo and lost to Garuda and Masa Takanashi. He would go on to compete for NJPW and Big Japan Pro Wrestling for a few months. Ibushi teamed with Kudo to take on Kenta and Naomichi Marufuji in the first round of Differ Cup 2005 and lost. Ibushi would go on to become Hustle Kamen Orange for Hustle, teaming with Hustle Kamen Red and the rest of the Hustle Kamen stable. Ibushi went on to team up with Fuka to win his first accomplishment in professionally wrestling, Dragon Mixture Tournament, by defeating Shinjitsu Nohashi and Yoshitsune in the final.

It was announced on January 26, 2008, that Ibushi would be competing for Ring of Honor in the United States. On April 11, 2008, in Boston he made his debut in a match against Davey Richards, a match in which he was cheered as a winner despite losing. During his brief tour of ROH, he wrestled against Claudio Castagnoli and teamed with Austin Aries against The Briscoe Brothers only to come up on the losing end. His last appearance of his U.S. tour of ROH ended with a singles victory over El Generico. Ibushi competed for ROH during the promotion's second tour of Japan, teaming with Kenta against Naomichi Marufuji and Katsuhiko Nakajima in a tag team match. It was announced on April 6, 2008, that Ibushi would be competing for Pro Wrestling Guerrilla in Burbank, California. However, Ibushi would end up injured before his scheduled appearance, and was forced to miss the PWG event. On March 27, 2009, Ibushi made his debut for Philadelphia-based Chikara at the promotions annual King of Trios tournament where he formed a team with Kudo and Michael Nakazawa. After his team was eliminated in the first round by Equinox, Lince Dorado and Helios, he went on to wrestle in the Rey de Voladores tournament over the next two days. On March 29, Ibushi defeated Player Dos to win the tournament and become the 2009 Rey de Voladores.

On January 16, 2010, Ibushi participated in Evolve's first show, losing to Davey Richards in the main event.

=== Dragondoor and El Dorado Wrestling (2005–2008) ===
Ibushi made his debut in Dragondoor on its debut show on July 19, 2005, taking part in Taiji Ishimori's babyface team along with Milanito Collection A.T. and Little Dragon. They were pitted in a handicap match against Aagan Iisou (Shuji Kondo, Takuya Sugawara and Yasshi), but they were defeated. Ibushi then teamed up with Ishimori to take part in the Aquamarine Cup tag tournament, beating at the first round a team of Aagan Iisou (Toru Owashi and Shogo Takagi) but being eliminated at the second by another (Kondo and Yasshi). After wrestling in the short-lived promotion for some months, Ibushi made a special appearance during its last show as a new member of Italian Connection (Milano Collection A.T. and Berlinetta Boxer) named Ibushino (a parody of Yossino) to defeat Aagan Iisou.

After Dragondoor folded, Ibushi was revealed as a part of its new incarnation, El Dorado Wrestling. He wrestled in El Dorado debut show on April 24, 2006, teaming with Ishimori and Jumping Kid Okimoto in a losing effort against Aagan Iisou and their new member Pineapple Hanai, later known as Ken45º. He got his revenge in El Dorado's first big show, teaming up with El Blazer and Milanito Collection a.t. to defeat Kondo, Yasshi and Ken45º after a miscommunication among those. In late 2006, Ibushi teamed with Milano Collection A.T. to take part in Treasure Hunters Tag Tournament and reached the finals before being knocked out by Dick Togo and Shuji Kondo. Ibushi and Kagetora won a number one condership match for the UWA World Tag Team Championship and went on to win the championships by defeating Tokyo Gurentai (Mazada and Nosawa Rongai) and would later vacate the championships due to inactivity. Ibushi gained a total of four points in Greatest Golden League 2008 which was not enough to progress out of block A and to the semi-final.

=== New Japan Pro-Wrestling ===
==== IWGP Junior Heavyweight Champion (2009–2014) ====
In May and June 2009 Ibushi participated in the Best of the Super Juniors Tournament held by NJPW. Ibushi fought the likes of Koji Kanemoto, Taichi Ishikari and Jushin Thunder Liger, before losing in the semi-finals to Prince Devitt. Ibushi was a participant in Pro Wrestling Noah's NTV Cup with tag team partner Atsushi Aoki and advanced to the finals before losing to Yoshinobu Kanemaru and Kotaro Suzuki.

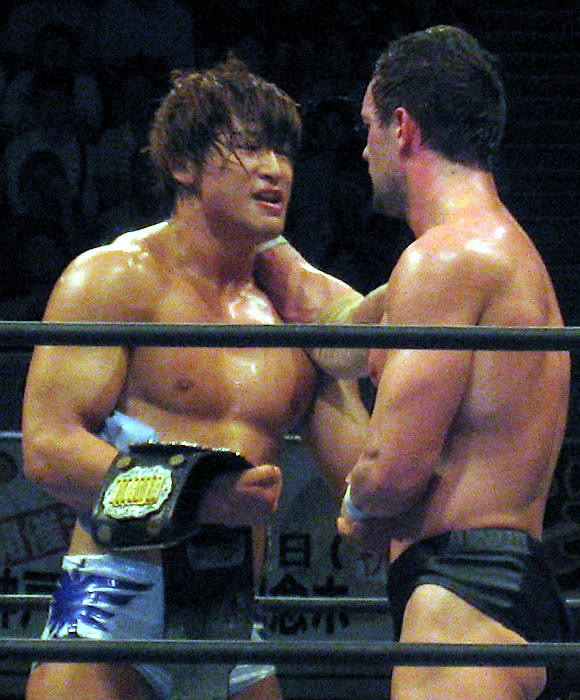
Ibushi in June 2011 after defeating Prince Devitt to win the IWGP Junior Heavyweight Championship

On June 1, 2010, Ibushi entered his second Best of the Super Juniors tournament. After winning his block with six victories out of seven matches, Ibushi defeated Ryusuke Taguchi to advance to the semifinals of the tournament, where he was once again defeated by Devitt. On October 11, 2010, Ibushi returned to New Japan at Destruction '10 and teamed with his regular DDT partner Kenny Omega to defeat Apollo 55 (Prince Devitt and Ryusuke Taguchi) for the IWGP Junior Heavyweight Tag Team Championship, after Ibushi pinned Devitt. As a result of the pinfall victory, Ibushi was granted a shot at Devitt's IWGP Junior Heavyweight Championship at New Japan's biggest event of the year, Wrestle Kingdom V on January 4, 2011. At the event Ibushi was unsuccessful in his attempt to win the title. On January 23 at Fantastica Mania 2011, a New Japan and Consejo Mundial de Lucha Libre co–promoted event in Tokyo, Ibushi and Omega lost the IWGP Junior Heavyweight Tag Team Championship back to Devitt and Taguchi. On May 26, Ibushi entered New Japan's 2011 Best of the Super Juniors tournament. After losing his first two-round robin stage matches, Ibushi came back with a six match win streak to finish first in his block and advance to the semifinals of the tournament. On June 10, Ibushi first defeated Davey Richards in the semifinals and then Ryusuke Taguchi in the finals to win the 2011 Best of the Super Juniors tournament and earn a shot at Prince Devitt's IWGP Junior Heavyweight Championship. On June 18 at Dominion 6.18, Ibushi defeated Prince Devitt to win the IWGP Junior Heavyweight Championship for the first time. Ibushi made his first defense of the title on July 24, defeating Devitt in a rematch at Ryōgoku Peter Pan 2011, and his second on August 1, defeating Devitt's tag team partner Ryusuke Taguchi. Ibushi then attempted to repeat Devitt's feat of holding both of New Japan's Junior Heavyweight Championships simultaneously, but on August 14, the Golden☆Lovers failed in their attempt to regain the IWGP Junior Heavyweight Tag Team Championship from Apollo 55. On September 12, Ibushi was stripped of both the IWGP Junior Heavyweight Championship and the KO-D Tag Team Championship, after he was sidelined with a dislocated left shoulder.

Ibushi returned to New Japan on June 16 at Dominion 6.16, when he, Daisuke Sasaki and Kenny Omega defeated Bushi, Kushida and Prince Devitt in a six-man tag team match. Later in the event, Ibushi challenged Low Ki to a match for the IWGP Junior Heavyweight Championship. On July 29, Ibushi defeated Low Ki to also win the IWGP Junior Heavyweight Championship for the second time. Ibushi made his first successful title defense on September 7, defeating Kushida. Ibushi followed up by also successfully defending the title against Ryusuke Taguchi on September 23 at Destruction. On October 8 at King of Pro-Wrestling, Ibushi lost the title back to Low Ki. On January 4, 2013, at Wrestle Kingdom 7, Ibushi unsuccessfully challenged Prince Devitt for the IWGP Junior Heavyweight Championship in a three-way match, which also included Low Ki. On July 5, Ibushi was announced as a surprise participant in the 2013 G1 Climax. He increased his weight from 84 kg (185 lb) to 88 kg (194 lb) to prepare himself for the heavyweight-level tournament. Ibushi finished the tournament with four wins and five losses, failing to advance from his block.

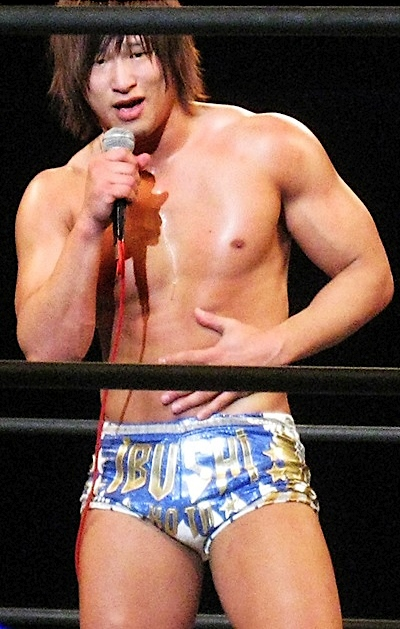
Ibushi in March 2015

On October 7, 2013, Ibushi, along with Naoki Sugabayashi and Sanshiro Takagi, representatives of both DDT and New Japan, held a press conference to announce that he had signed a dual contract with both promotions; three years with DDT and one year with New Japan, making him the first wrestler to have such a contract and officially have two home promotions. Ibushi wrestled his first match under a New Japan contract on October 14 at King of Pro-Wrestling, where he, Togi Makabe and Tomoaki Honma were defeated in a six-man tag team match by Bullet Club (Prince Devitt, Bad Luck Fale and Karl Anderson). Returning to the junior heavyweight division, Ibushi then began chasing Devitt for the IWGP Junior Heavyweight Championship. On January 4, 2014, at Wrestle Kingdom 8, Ibushi defeated Devitt to win the IWGP Junior Heavyweight Championship for the third time. Ibushi made his first successful title defense against El Desperado on February 11 at The New Beginning in Osaka. On March 6, Ibushi main evented New Japan's 42nd anniversary event, losing to Kazuchika Okada in the annual non-title match between the IWGP Junior Heavyweight and IWGP Heavyweight champions. On April 3, Ibushi made his second successful defense of the IWGP Junior Heavyweight Championship against Nick Jackson. Three days later at Invasion Attack 2014, Ibushi and El Desperado unsuccessfully challenged Nick and his brother Matt, The Young Bucks, for the IWGP Junior Heavyweight Tag Team Championship. Ibushi's third defense of the IWGP Junior Heavyweight Championship took place on May 3 at Wrestling Dontaku 2014, where he defeated Ryusuke Taguchi. On May 25 at Back to the Yokohama Arena, Ibushi unsuccessfully challenged Tomohiro Ishii for the NEVER Openweight Championship. On June 21 at Dominion 6.21, Ibushi successfully defended the IWGP Junior Heavyweight Championship against the winner of the 2014 Best of the Super Juniors, Ricochet. On July 4, Ibushi lost the title to Kushida in his fifth defense. During the match, Ibushi suffered a concussion, which forced him to pull out of the 2014 G1 Climax.

==== Heavyweight division (2014–2016) ====
On October 3, it was announced that Ibushi, now billed as a permanent heavyweight wrestler, had signed a one-year extension to his NJPW contract. Ibushi would make his return after the G1 and at Power Struggle on November 8, attacked Shinsuke Nakamura after his match, issuing a challenge for the IWGP Intercontinental Championship. Ibushi received his shot at the title on January 4, 2015, at Wrestle Kingdom 9, but was defeated by Nakamura. On March 5, Ibushi entered the 2015 New Japan Cup, defeating IWGP Tag Team Champion Doc Gallows in his first round match. After defeating Toru Yano in the second round on March 8, Ibushi first defeated Tetsuya Naito in the semifinals and then Hirooki Goto in the finals on March 15 to win the tournament and earn the right to challenge for the singles heavyweight title of his choosing. Following the final match, Ibushi announced he had decided to challenge A.J. Styles for the IWGP Heavyweight Championship. The match took place on April 5 at Invasion Attack 2015 and saw Styles retain his title. From July 20 to August 14, Ibushi took part in the 2015 G1 Climax. He failed to advance from his block with a record of four wins and five losses, scoring big wins over former IWGP Heavyweight Champion A.J. Styles and reigning NEVER Openweight Champion Togi Makabe. As a result, Ibushi received a shot at the NEVER Openweight Championship on September 23 at Destruction in Okayama, but was defeated by Makabe. On November 2, NJPW announced that Ibushi was sidelined indefinitely due to cervical disc herniation. In February 2016, Ibushi announced his resignation from NJPW.

=== Return to the independent circuit (2016–2018) ===
On February 21, 2016, Ibushi announced that while he had been cleared to return to the ring from his herniated cervical disc, he had decided to resign from both DDT and NJPW and continue his career as a freelancer due to feeling he could not handle the burden of working two schedules. As a freelancer, he was billed as a representative of Ibushi Puroresu Kenkyujo ("Ibushi Pro Wrestling Research Institute"). He wrestled his return match and his first match as a freelancer at DDT's 19th anniversary event on March 21, where he and Gota Ihashi defeated Jun Kasai and Sanshiro Takagi, and Kenso and Michael Nakazawa in a three-way tag team match. In April, Ibushi returned to the United States to take part in events held by Evolve and Kaiju Big Battel, while also appearing in the audience at WWE's NXT TakeOver: Dallas event. On May 29, Ibushi made his debut for Inoki Genome Federation (IGF), defeating Tanomusaku Toba. On August 11, Ibushi made his debut for Wrestle-1, defeating Jiro Kuroshio.

=== WWE (2016) ===
On June 13, 2016, Ibushi was announced as a participant in WWE's Cruiserweight Classic tournament. The tournament kicked off on June 23 with Ibushi defeating Sean Maluta in his first round match. On July 13, Ibushi made his NXT in-ring debut, defeating Buddy Murphy at the NXT tapings. The following day, Ibushi defeated Cedric Alexander in his second round match in the Cruiserweight Classic. On July 15, Pro Wrestling Torch reported that Ibushi had signed a developmental contract with WWE. In an interview published July 25, Ibushi admitted he had been offered a contract, but denied having signed it. On August 26, Ibushi defeated Brian Kendrick to advance to the semifinals of the Cruiserweight Classic. On September 14, Ibushi was eliminated from the tournament in the semifinals by eventual winner T. J. Perkins. Afterwards, Pro Wrestling Torch went back on their earlier report and stated that Ibushi had not agreed to a WWE contract beyond the tournament, which was a factor in him losing the semifinal match. On September 29, WWE announced that Ibushi would be teaming up with NXT's Hideo Itami in the upcoming Dusty Rhodes Tag Team Classic. When Itami was injured, Ibushi was paired up with Perkins. The two entered the tournament on October 13, defeating Lince Dorado and Mustafa Ali in their first round match. Later that same day, they were eliminated from the tournament in the second round by Sanity (Alexander Wolfe and Sawyer Fulton).

=== Return to NJPW ===
==== Tiger Mask W (2016–2017) ====
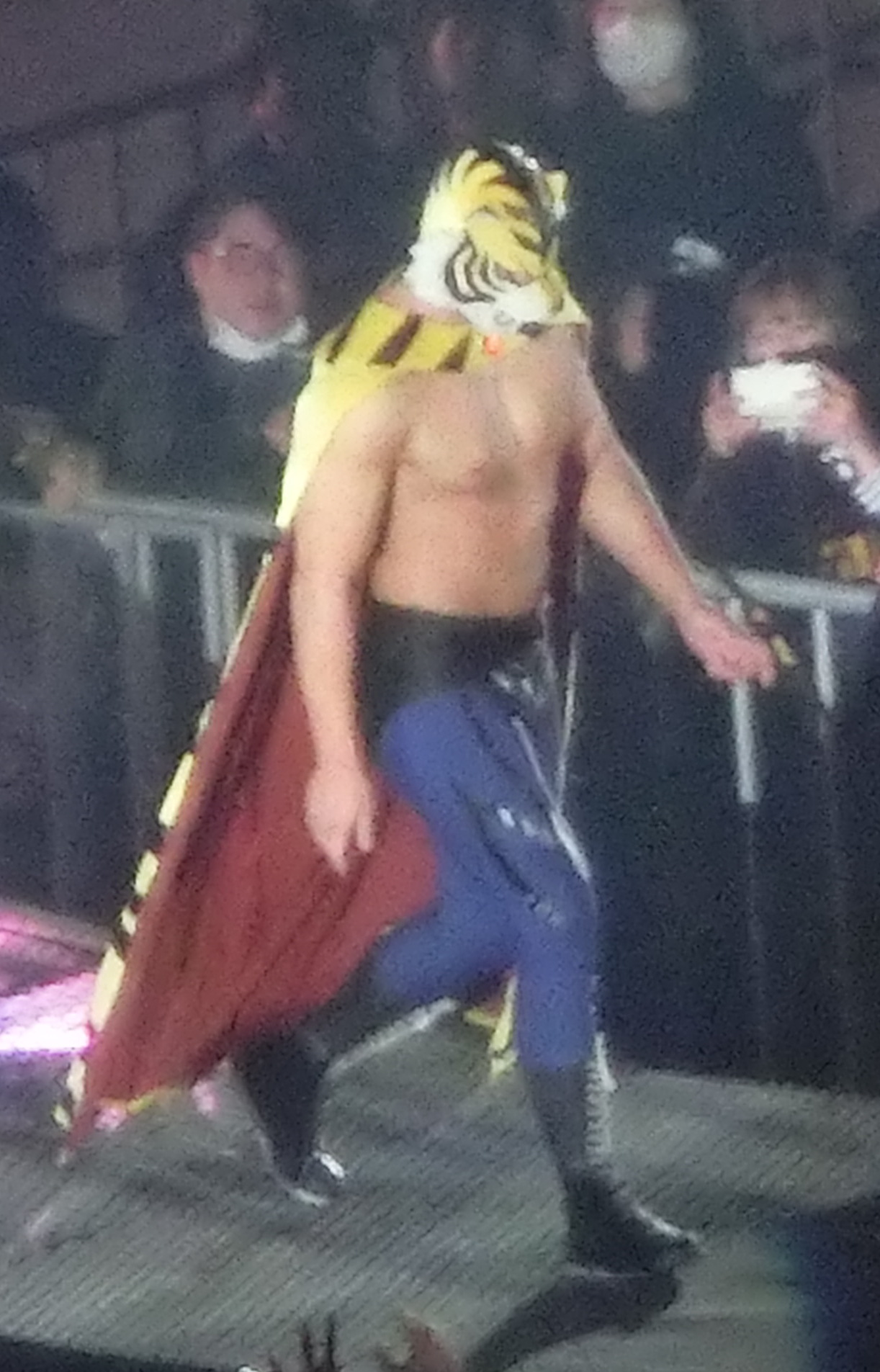
Ibushi as Tiger Mask W in January 2017

On October 10, 2016, Ibushi returned to NJPW, taking part in a dark match prior to the King of Pro-Wrestling event. Ibushi wrestled the match as the masked character Tiger Mask W, based on the anime series of the same name, defeating Red Death Mask. The following day, NJPW announced that Tiger Mask W would return to the promotion in January 2017. Tiger Mask W returned on January 4, 2017, defeating Tiger the Dark at Wrestle Kingdom 11. On February 5, after successfully defending the IWGP Heavyweight Championship against Minoru Suzuki, Kazuchika Okada brought up Tiger Mask W as his next possible opponent, leading to a program between the two heading into NJPW's 45th anniversary show. On March 1, Tiger Mask W teamed with Tiger Mask to defeat Okada and Gedo in a tag team match. On March 6 at the 45th anniversary show, Tiger Mask W was defeated by Okada in a non-title main event.

==== Golden☆Lovers reunion (2017–2019) ====
On June 20, NJPW announced Ibushi, under his real name, as a participant in the 2017 G1 Climax. NJPW billed this as Ibushi's return to the company after two and a half years, not acknowledging his stint as Tiger Mask W. Ibushi finished the tournament on August 11 with a record of five wins and four losses, failing to advance from his block. On November 5 at Power Struggle, Ibushi unsuccessfully challenged Hiroshi Tanahashi for the IWGP Intercontinental Championship. On January 4, 2018, Ibushi defeated Cody at Wrestle Kingdom 12. It had been previously billed as a title match for Cody's ROH World Championship, but Cody lost it to Dalton Castle, before he had the chance to defend it at Wrestle Kingdom 12. At New Year Dash!! 2018, Ibushi was attacked by Cody after losing a match to Bullet Club, but leader Kenny Omega stopped him from doing so. At The New Beginning in Sapporo, Ibushi returned the favor, saving Omega, who was involved in an altercation with other Bullet Club members Cody and Hangman Page. In doing so, they reunited the Golden☆Lovers tag-team for the first time since 2014.

On night two of Honor Rising, the Golden☆Lovers won their return match as a team against Cody and Marty Scurll. After the match, Ibushi and Omega were confronted by the Young Bucks and challenged to a match at Strong Style Evolved on March 25. At the event, the Golden☆Lovers defeated the Young Bucks. Although Ibushi would later become a regular in Bullet Club tag matches during the Road to Wrestling Dontaku tour in April and May 2018, he was not considered a member of the faction. On June 9 at Dominion in Osaka-jo Hall, Ibushi was in Omega's corner, as he defeated Kazuchika Okada for the IWGP Heavyweight Championship. After the match, Ibushi, Omega and the Young Bucks all embraced in the ring, and formed a new sub-group called The Golden☆Elite.

Ibushi then participated in the 2018 G1 Climax, finishing with a record of six wins and three losses, tied for top of his block. He proceeded to the finals due to a victory in his final block match against Omega. This would make Ibushi the first professional wrestler to proceed to the final of the New Japan Cup, Best of the Super Juniors and the G1 Climax. However, he lost the final to Tanahashi. On December 9, Ibushi defeated Hirooki Goto for the NEVER Openweight Championship, but lost it one month later against Will Ospreay at Wrestle Kingdom 13.

==== G1 Climax and final IWGP Heavyweight Champion (2019–2021) ====
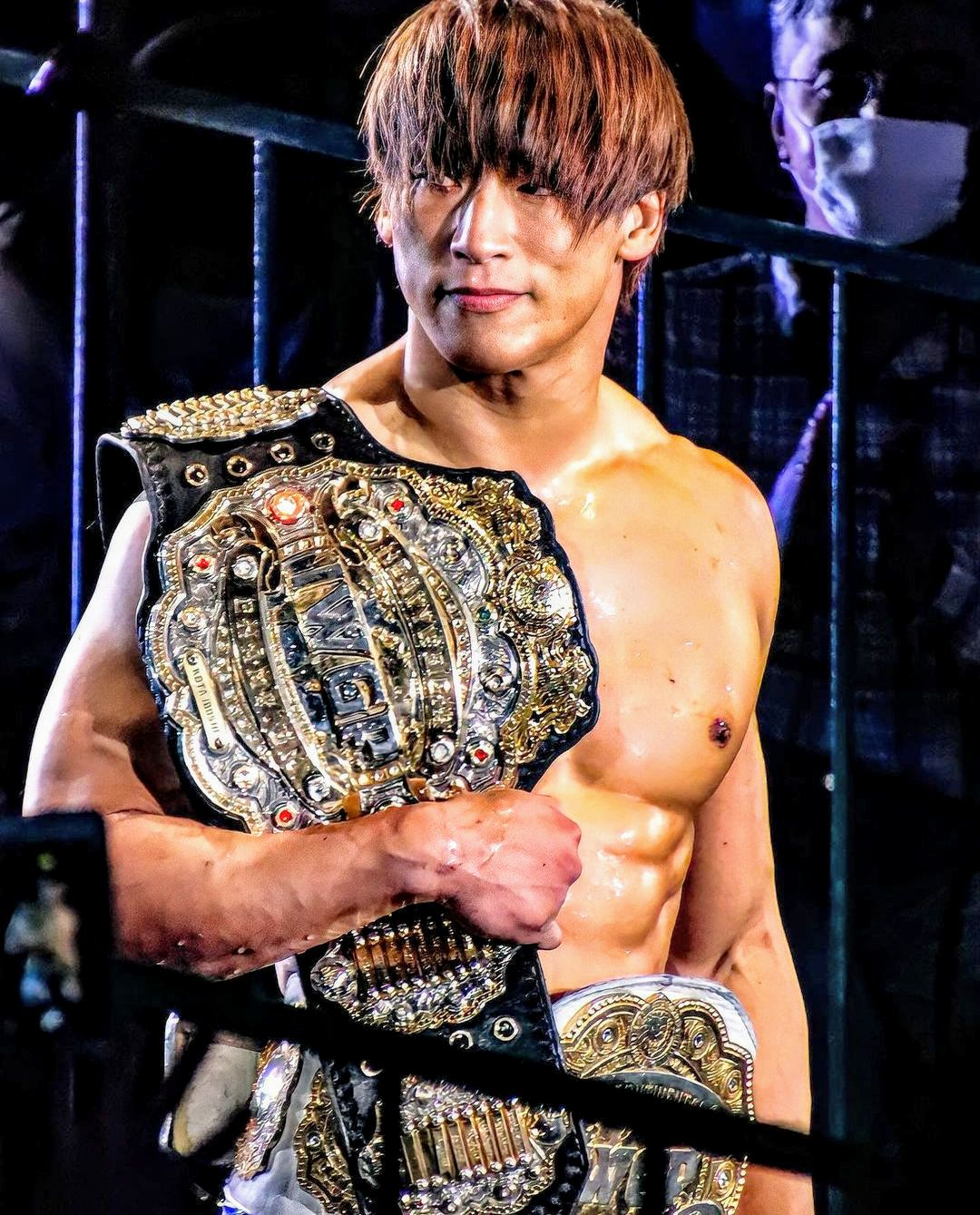
Ibushi as IWGP Heavyweight Champion

On February 11, 2019, Ibushi announced that he was staying in New Japan. He also said, that he will be first competitor in 2019 New Japan Cup. This came after speculation he was going to follow Omega to American promotion All Elite Wrestling (AEW). Since this announcement, he wrestled exclusively in NJPW. It was later revealed to be a two-year deal. In the first round of the New Japan Cup on March 10, he defeated Tetsuya Naito to advance to the next round but lose to Zack Sabre Jr in the second round. Due to defeating Naito, he was granted an IWGP Intercontinental Championship match against Naito at April 2019's G1 Supercard. Ibushi successfully defeated Naito and became the IWGP Intercontinental Champion for the first time in his career.

At Dominion 6.9 in Osaka-jo Hall, Ibushi lost the IWGP Intercontinental Championship back to Naito. Ibushi went on to compete in the 2019 G1 Climax winning the A block, finishing with 14 points, defeating Lance Archer, Bad Luck Fale, Will Ospreay, Zack Sabre Jr., Sanada, Hiroshi Tanahashi, and IWGP Heavyweight Champion Kazuchika Okada. His only two losses came to Kenta at G1 Climax in Dallas and to Evil. He went on the defeat the winner of the B Block, Jay White, in the finals to win the tournament. This made Ibushi the first wrestler to win the G1 Climax, the New Japan Cup and the Best of the Super Juniors, the three main singles tournament in NJPW, in their career. He received his G1 Climax title shot on Night 1 of Wrestle Kingdom 14, where he was defeated by Okada for the IWGP Heavyweight Championship, before losing to White in a singles match on Night 2.

On February 21, 2020, on the New Japan Road event, Ibushi and Tanahashi, dubbing themselves Golden☆Ace, defeated the Guerrillas of Destiny to win the IWGP Tag Team Championship, Ibushi's first time winning the title and first tag team title win in NJPW since 2010. In June, Ibushi entered the New Japan Cup, where he defeated Zack Sabre Jr. in the first round, before losing to Taichi in the second round. On July 12, at Dominion, Ibushi and Tanahashi lost their tag team championship to Taichi and Sabre. On September 19, Ibushi entered G1 Climax 30, where he scored his first win in A Block against Kazuchika Okada. He only lost two matches during the whole tournament, against Shingo Takagi and White, the man he beat to win the previous year's G1. On October 18, Ibushi won the tournament by defeating B Block winner, Sanada.

On November 7, 2020, at Power Struggle, Ibushi became the first man to unsuccessfully defend the Tokyo Dome IWGP Heavyweight and Intercontinental Championships challenge rights certificate, by losing the briefcase to White. Even though he had lost the right to challenge at the Tokyo Dome, Naito allowed him to challenge on 4 January, as Jay White had declared he'd be taking that night off.

On January 4, 2021, at Wrestle Kingdom 15, Ibushi pinned Naito in the main event to win the IWGP Heavyweight and Intercontinental Championships, becoming only the third man to win the IWGP Heavyweight and Junior Heavyweight Championships in history (the first two being Nobuhiko Takada and former Golden Lovers tag team partner Kenny Omega). He went on to successfully defend both titles against White Ibushi would later declare his intentions to unify the IWGP Heavyweight and Intercontinental Championships.

==== Inaugural IWGP World Heavyweight Champion, injury and departure (2021–2023) ====
After several months of Ibushi claiming that he wanted to unify his Heavyweight and Intercontinental titles into one, NJPW announced on March 1, 2021, that the championships would officially be unified into the new IWGP World Heavyweight Championship at the NJPW 49th Anniversary Show on March 4, with the winner of Ibushi's match against El Desperado for the Heavyweight and Intercontinental titles being crowned the inaugural champion; at the event, Ibushi won the match, making him the final IWGP Heavyweight Champion, the final IWGP Intercontinental Champion, and the inaugural IWGP World Heavyweight Champion. On April 4 at Sakura Genesis, Ibushi dropped the championship to 2021 New Japan Cup winner Will Ospreay in his first defense, ending his reign at 31 days. Ibushi would go on to make his fourth consecutive G1 Climax final, but would lose to Kazuchika Okada after suffering an arm injury, causing a referee stoppage. On February 1, 2023, Ibushi's contract with NJPW expired, rendering him a free agent.

=== All Elite Wrestling (2023–present) ===
On the July 13, 2023, episode of Dynamite, Ibushi was announced as the mystery partner of The Elite in their Blood & Guts match against the Blackpool Combat Club and would make his All Elite Wrestling (AEW) debut at the namesake event the following week, thus reuniting with Kenny Omega and reforming the Golden Lovers, now under the "Golden Elite" name (since Adam Page and the Young Bucks were also competing). The team then won the match the following week. Ibushi once again teamed with Omega and Page to face Konosuke Takeshita and Bullet Club Gold (Jay White and Juice Robinson) at All In in a losing effort. He again wrestled at WrestleDream, teaming once again with Omega and with Chris Jericho in a losing effort against Konosuke Takeshita, Sammy Guevara and Will Ospreay. On the November 15, 2023 episode of Dynamite Ibushi aided Jericho, Omega, and Paul Wight in defeating The Don Callis Family (Powerhouse Hobbs, Konosuke Takeshita and Kyle Fletcher) and Brian Cage in a street fight. After the match, AEW president and CEO Tony Khan announced that Ibushi had signed with AEW.

On the June 21, 2025 episode of Collision, Ibushi returned after nearly two years off television, confronting Kazuchika Okada. On the June 25 episode of Dynamite, Ibushi made his singles debut and in-ring return, defeating Trent Beretta. On July 2 at Dynamite 300, Ibushi was defeated by Okada. Post-match, he was attacked by Okada and the Don Callis Family, leading to Omega coming to his aid, once again reuniting the Golden Lovers. On July 12 at All In, Ibushi competed in the men's Casino Gauntlet match, which was won by MJF. Later in the show, Ibushi accompanied Omega for his match against Okada. On August 24 at Forbidden Door, the Golden Lovers teamed with Darby Allin, Hiroshi Tanahashi, and Will Ospreay to defeat the Death Riders, The Young Bucks, and Gabe Kidd a lights out steel cage match. On the October 8 tapings for Collision, Ibushi suffered a legitimate leg injury during his match against Josh Alexander and was stretchered out of the arena. On October 12, Ibushi revealed that he had suffered a broken femur and would be out of action for up to two years.

=== Pro Wrestling Noah (2023–2024) ===
On November 2, 2023, at Noah the Best, Ibushi made his return to Pro Wrestling Noah after eleven years, confronting Naomichi Marufuji after his match, challenging him to a match at Noah The New Year. Marufuji accepted, stating that he was "waiting for him in the ring at Ariake Arena", before both shaking hands, with the match being billed as "Destiny". Afterwards, Noah announced that the match would be the main event of Noah The New Year. Afterwards, the announcement for the main event mixed reactions among fans, including criticism, mainly on social media, leading Noah's Executive Officer Narihiro Takeda to reveal that he attributed them the main event, due to the popularity of both wrestlers over the GHC Heavyweight Championship match. At the event, on January 2, 2024, Ibushi faced Marufuji. Prior to the match, Ibushi had sustained a broken ankle but decided to work the match. During his entrance, Ibushi visibly struggled walking to the ring. In the match itself, Ibushi reportedly suffered injuries to both of his ankles which included the already injured left ankle, however, he managed to win the match. Afterwards, Ibushi was taken to a hospital by an ambulance. Shortly after, Noah's Executive Officer appeared backstage to announce that Ibushi would not be making any post-match comments.

=== Return to DDT (2024) ===
On August 25, 2024 at Summer Vacation Memories, Ibushi made his return to DDT for the first time since 2016, where he teamed with Akito and Danshoku Dino in a losing effort to Burning (Tetsuya Endo, Yuki Iino, and Yuya Koroku). In November 2024, it was reported that Ibushi's DDT return was cut short due to "backstage issues".

=== Second return to NJPW (2026) ===
On January 4, 2026 at Wrestle Kingdom 20, Ibushi made his return to NJPW after three years, as part of Hiroshi Tanahashi's retirement ceremony.

== Martial arts career ==
Prior to the start of his professional wrestling career, Ibushi practiced karate, winning a shinkarate K-2 tournament in 2003. In 2006, Ibushi was planning on making his K-1 MAX debut, but it was cancelled after his opponent was injured. On November 11, 2014, Ibushi announced he would be making his shoot boxing debut in an exhibition match on November 30. The match with Ibushi's fellow DDT wrestler Michael Nakazawa ended in a draw.

== Championships and accomplishments ==
- CBS Sports
  - NJPW Wrestler of the Year (2018)
- Chikara
  - Rey de Voladores (2009)
- DDT Pro-Wrestling
  - IMGP World Heavyweight Championship (1 time)
  - Independent World Junior Heavyweight Championship (1 time)
  - Ironman Heavymetalweight Championship (3 times)
  - KO-D 6-Man Tag Team Championship (2 times) – with Gota Ihashi and Kenny Omega (1), and Daisuke Sasaki and Kenny Omega (1)
  - KO-D Openweight Championship (3 times)
  - KO-D Tag Team Championship (5 times) – with Daichi Kakimoto (1), Kenny Omega (2), Danshoku Dino (1) and Daisuke Sasaki (1)
  - Go-1 Climax (2014)
  - KO-D Openweight Championship Contendership Tournament (2009)
  - KO-D Tag League (2005) – with Daichi Kakimoto
  - DDT48/Dramatic Sousenkyo (2012, 2014)
  - Best Match Award (2012) vs. Kenny Omega on August 18
- El Dorado Wrestling
  - UWA World Tag Team Championship (1 time) – with Kagetora
- Inside The Ropes Magazine
  - Ranked No. 6 of the top 50 wrestlers in the world in the ITR 50 in 2020.
- Japan Indie Awards
  - Best Bout Award (2008) vs. Kenny Omega (DDT, August 6)
  - Best Bout Award (2011) vs. Dick Togo (DDT, March 27)
  - Best Bout Award (2012) vs. Kenny Omega (DDT, August 18)
  - Best Bout Award (2014) with Kenny Omega vs. Konosuke Takeshita and Tetsuya Endo (DDT, September 28)
  - MVP Award (2007, 2009)
- Kaientai Dojo
  - Tag Team Best Bout K-Award (2007) with Madoka vs. Dick Togo and Taka Michinoku on December 1
- Kaiju Big Battel
  - KBB Hashtag Championship (1 time)
- New Japan Pro-Wrestling
  - IWGP Heavyweight Championship (1 time)
  - IWGP Intercontinental Championship (2 times)
  - IWGP Junior Heavyweight Championship (3 times)
  - IWGP Junior Heavyweight Tag Team Championship (1 time) – with Kenny Omega
  - IWGP Tag Team Championship (1 time) – with Hiroshi Tanahashi
  - NEVER Openweight Championship (1 time)
  - Third NJPW Triple Crown Champion
  - Best of the Super Juniors (2011)
  - G1 Climax (2019, 2020)
  - New Japan Cup (2015)
  - Concurso (2020)
- Nikkan Sports
  - Best Tag Team Award (2010) with Kenny Omega
  - Technique Award (2009, 2010)
- Pro Wrestling Illustrated
  - Ranked No. 5 of the top 500 singles wrestlers in the PWI 500 in 2021
- SoCal Uncensored
  - Southern California Match of the Year (2018) with Kenny Omega vs. The Young Bucks on March 25
- Sports Illustrated
  - Ranked No 2. of the top 10 men's wrestlers in 2018 – tied with Kenny Omega
  - Ranked No. 8 of the top 10 wrestlers in 2020
- Tokyo Sports
  - Best Bout Award (2010) with Kenny Omega vs. Prince Devitt and Ryusuke Taguchi (NJPW, October 11)
  - Best Bout Award (2013) vs. Shinsuke Nakamura (NJPW, August 4)
  - Technique Award (2009, 2019)
- Toryumon Mexico
  - Young Dragons Cup (2006)
- Último Dragón Fiesta
  - Dragon Mixture Tournament (2006) – with Daichi Kakimoto, Fuka and Seiya Morohashi
- Weekly Pro Wrestling
  - Best Bout Award (2010) with Kenny Omega vs. Prince Devitt and Ryusuke Taguchi (NJPW, October 11)
  - Best Bout Award (2018) vs. Hiroshi Tanahashi
  - Best Tag Team Award (2010) with Kenny Omega
- Wrestling Observer Newsletter
  - Best Flying Wrestler (2009, 2010, 2012, 2013)
  - Pro Wrestling Match of the Year (2015) vs. Shinsuke Nakamura on January 4
  - Wrestling Observer Newsletter Hall of Fame (Class of 2022)
