= Takamatsu City General Gymnasium =

Arena in Takamatsu, Kagawa, Japan

Coordinates: 34°20′31″N 134°4′27″E

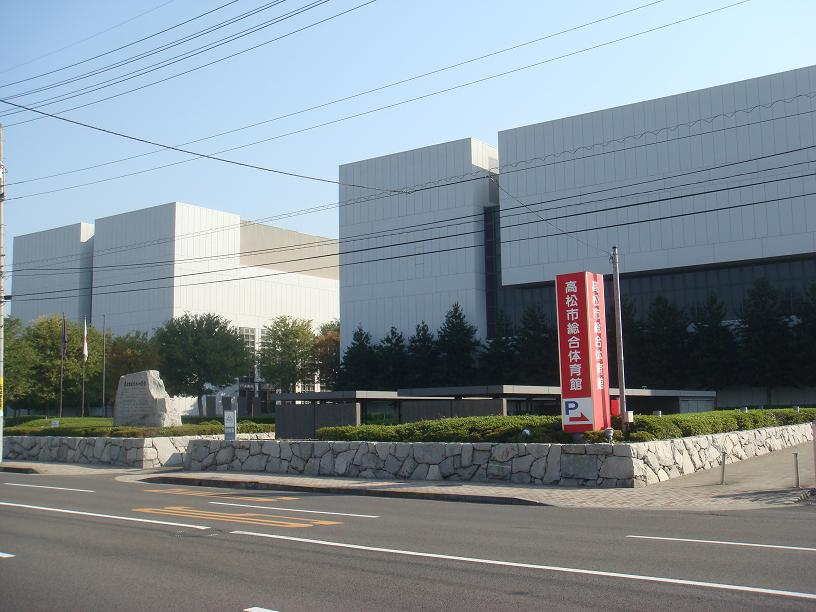
- Interactive map of Takamatsu City General Gymnasium
- Full name: Takamatsu City General Gymnasium
- Location: Takamatsu, Kagawa, Japan
- Owner: Takamatsu city
- Operator: Takamatsu city

Construction
- Opened: 1986
- Cost

Tenant
- Kagawa Five Arrows

Website
- http://www.taka-spo.or.jp/sou1.html

Takamatsu City General Gymnasium is an arena in Takamatsu, Kagawa, Japan. It is the home arena of the Kagawa Five Arrows of the B.League, Japan's professional basketball league.

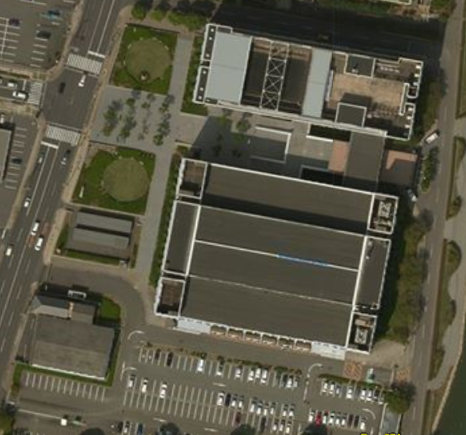
Satellite view
