= List of NEVER Openweight Champions =

Listing of professional wrestling champions for the NEVER Openweight Championship

The NEVER Openweight Championship is a professional wrestling championship owned by the New Japan Pro-Wrestling (NJPW) promotion. NEVER is an acronym of the terms "New Blood", "Evolution", "Valiantly", "Eternal", and "Radical" and was a NJPW-promoted series of events, which featured younger up-and-coming talent and outside wrestlers not signed to the promotion. The project was officially announced on July 12, 2010, and held its first event on August 24, 2010.

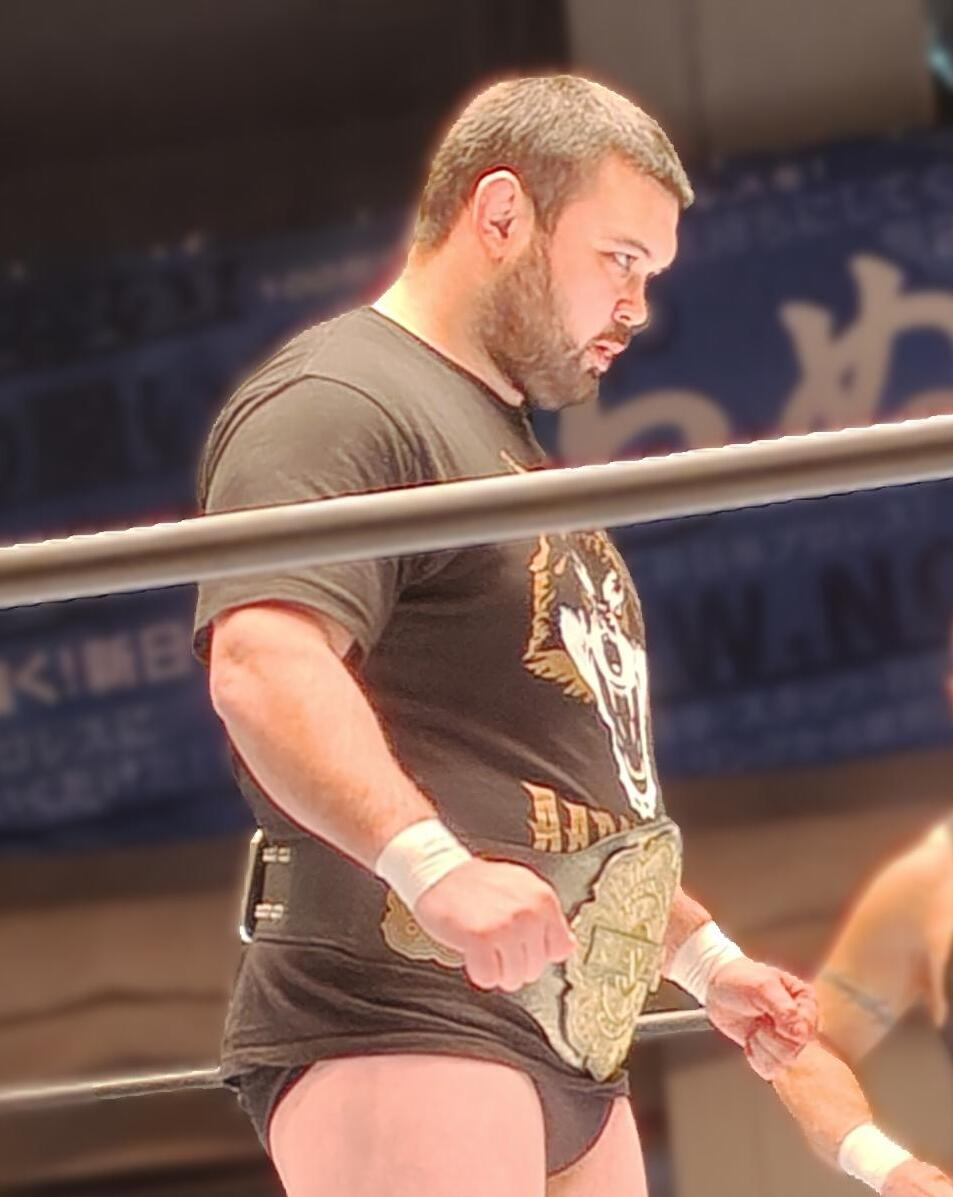
Current champion Aaron Wolf.

As of November 21, 2026, there have been 52 reigns shared among 27 different wrestlers, with one vacancy. Masato Tanaka was the first champion in the title's history. He also holds the record for the longest reign in the title's history at 314 days during his only reign. Tomohiro Ishii has the most reigns, with six. Michael Elgin's only reign of 8 days is the shortest in the title's history. Minoru Suzuki is the oldest champion when he won it at 52 years old while Will Ospreay is the youngest champion at 25 years old.

Aaron Wolf is the current champion in his second reign. He won the title by defeating Ren Narita at Dominion 6.14 in Osaka-jo Hall in Osaka, Japan, on June 14, 2026.

== Title history ==
Key
No.	Overall reign number
Reign	Reign number for the specific champion
Days	Number of days held
Defenses	Number of successful defenses
+	Current reign is changing daily

No.	Champion	Championship change			Reign statistics			Notes	Ref.
No.	Champion	Date	Event	Location	Reign	Days	Defenses	Notes	Ref.
New Japan Pro Wrestling (NJPW)
1	Masato Tanaka	November 19, 2012	Shodai NEVER Musabetsu Kyu Oza Kettei Tournament Final	Tokyo, Japan	1	314	4	Tanaka defeated Karl Anderson in the finals of a sixteen-man tournament to become the inaugural champion.	
2	Tetsuya Naito	September 29, 2013	Destruction	Kobe, Japan	1	135	2	Naito's Tokyo Dome IWGP Heavyweight Championship challenge rights certificate was also on the line.	
3	Tomohiro Ishii	February 11, 2014	The New Beginning in Osaka	Osaka, Japan	1	138	4		
4	Yujiro Takahashi	June 29, 2014	Kizuna Road 2014	Tokyo, Japan	1	106	1		
5	Tomohiro Ishii	October 13, 2014	King of Pro-Wrestling	Tokyo, Japan	2	83	1		
6	Togi Makabe	January 4, 2015	Wrestle Kingdom 9 in Tokyo Dome	Tokyo, Japan	1	41	0		
—	Vacated	February 14, 2015	—	—	—	—	—	The title was vacated due to Makabe being sidelined with influenza.	
7	Tomohiro Ishii	February 14, 2015	The New Beginning in Sendai	Sendai, Japan	3	74	0	Ishii defeated Tomoaki Honma to win the vacant title.	
8	Togi Makabe	April 29, 2015	Wrestling Hinokuni	Mashiki, Japan	2	166	2		
9	Tomohiro Ishii	October 12, 2015	King of Pro-Wrestling	Tokyo, Japan	4	84	1		
10	Katsuyori Shibata	January 4, 2016	Wrestle Kingdom 10 in Tokyo Dome	Tokyo, Japan	1	120	3		
11	Yuji Nagata	May 3, 2016	Wrestling Dontaku	Fukuoka, Japan	1	47	0		
12	Katsuyori Shibata	June 19, 2016	Dominion 6.19 in Osaka-jo Hall	Osaka, Japan	2	139	3		
13	Evil	November 5, 2016	Power Struggle	Osaka, Japan	1	10	0		
14	Katsuyori Shibata	November 15, 2016	Wrestling World 2016 in Singapore	Singapore	3	50	0		
15	Hirooki Goto	January 4, 2017	Wrestle Kingdom 11 in Tokyo Dome	Tokyo, Japan	1	113	3		
16	Minoru Suzuki	April 27, 2017	Road to Wrestling Dontaku 2017: Aki no Kuni Sengoku Emaki	Hiroshima, Japan	1	252	4		
17	Hirooki Goto	January 4, 2018	Wrestle Kingdom 12 in Tokyo Dome	Tokyo, Japan	2	156	3	This was a hair vs. hair match.	
18	Michael Elgin	June 9, 2018	Dominion 6.9 in Osaka-jo Hall	Osaka, Japan	1	8	0	This was a three-way match also including Taichi.	
19	Hirooki Goto	June 17, 2018	Kizuna Road 2018	Tokyo, Japan	3	92	1		
20	Taichi	September 17, 2018	Destruction in Beppu	Beppu, Japan	1	47	0		
21	Hirooki Goto	November 3, 2018	Power Struggle	Osaka, Japan	4	36	0		
22	Kota Ibushi	December 9, 2018	World Tag League	Iwate, Japan	1	26	0		
23	Will Ospreay	January 4, 2019	Wrestle Kingdom 13 in Tokyo Dome	Tokyo, Japan	1	92	1	Ospreay is the only junior heavyweight to win the title.	
24	Jeff Cobb	April 6, 2019	G1 Supercard	New York City, U.S.	1	27	0	Cobb's ROH World Television Championship was also on the line.	
25	Taichi	May 3, 2019	Wrestling Dontaku	Fukuoka, Japan	2	37	0		
26	Tomohiro Ishii	June 9, 2019	Dominion 6.9 in Osaka-jo Hall	Osaka, Japan	5	83	0		
27	Kenta	August 31, 2019	Royal Quest	London, England	1	127	2		
28	Hirooki Goto	January 5, 2020	Wrestle Kingdom 14 in Tokyo Dome; Night 2	Tokyo, Japan	5	27	0		
29	Shingo Takagi	February 1, 2020	The New Beginning in Sapporo	Sapporo, Japan	1	210	3		
30	Minoru Suzuki	August 29, 2020	Summer Struggle in Jingu	Tokyo, Japan	2	70	0		
31	Shingo Takagi	November 7, 2020	Power Struggle	Osaka, Japan	2	84	1		
32	Hiroshi Tanahashi	January 30, 2021	The New Beginning in Nagoya	Nagoya, Japan	1	93	1		
33	Jay White	May 3, 2021	Wrestling Dontaku	Fukuoka, Japan	1	194	1		
34	Tomohiro Ishii	November 13, 2021	Battle in the Valley	San Jose, California, U.S.	6	52	0	Had Ishii lost, he could never challenge for the NEVER Openweight Championship again.	
35	Evil	January 4, 2022	Wrestle Kingdom 16; Night 1	Tokyo, Japan	2	117	2		
36	Tama Tonga	May 1, 2022	Wrestling Dontaku	Fukuoka, Japan	1	42	0		
37	Karl Anderson	June 12, 2022	Dominion 6.12 in Osaka-jo Hall	Osaka, Japan	1	206	2		
38	Tama Tonga	January 4, 2023	Wrestle Kingdom 17	Tokyo, Japan	2	119	1		
39	David Finlay	May 3, 2023	Wrestling Dontaku	Fukuoka, Japan	1	159	1		
40	Tama Tonga	October 9, 2023	Destruction in Ryōgoku	Tokyo, Japan	3	19	0		
41	Shingo Takagi	October 28, 2023	Fighting Spirit Unleashed	Las Vegas, Nevada, U.S.	3	68	1		
42	Tama Tonga	January 4, 2024	Wrestle Kingdom 18	Tokyo, Japan	4	16	0		
43	Evil	January 20, 2024	The New Beginning in Nagoya	Nagoya, Japan	3	77	1	This was a Lumberjack match.	
44	Shingo Takagi	April 6, 2024	Sakura Genesis	Tokyo, Japan	4	71	3		
45	Henare	June 16, 2024	New Japan Soul; Night 1	Sapporo, Japan	1	105	1		
46	Shingo Takagi	September 29, 2024	Destruction in Kobe	Kobe, Japan	5	97	1		
47	Konosuke Takeshita	January 4, 2025	Wrestle Kingdom 19	Tokyo, Japan	1	162	6	This was a Winner Takes All match, also for Takeshita's AEW International Championship.	
48	Boltin Oleg	June 15, 2025	Dominion 6.15 in Osaka-jo Hall	Osaka, Japan	1	120	2		
49	Evil	October 13, 2025	King of Pro-Wrestling	Tokyo, Japan	4	83	0		
50	Aaron Wolf	January 4, 2026	Wrestle Kingdom 20	Tokyo, Japan	1	38	0		
51	Ren Narita	February 11, 2026	The New Beginning in Osaka	Osaka, Japan	1	113	1		
52	Aaron Wolf	June 14, 2026	Dominion 6.14 in Osaka-jo Hall	Osaka, Japan	2	160+	1		

== Combined reigns ==
As of November 21, 2026.

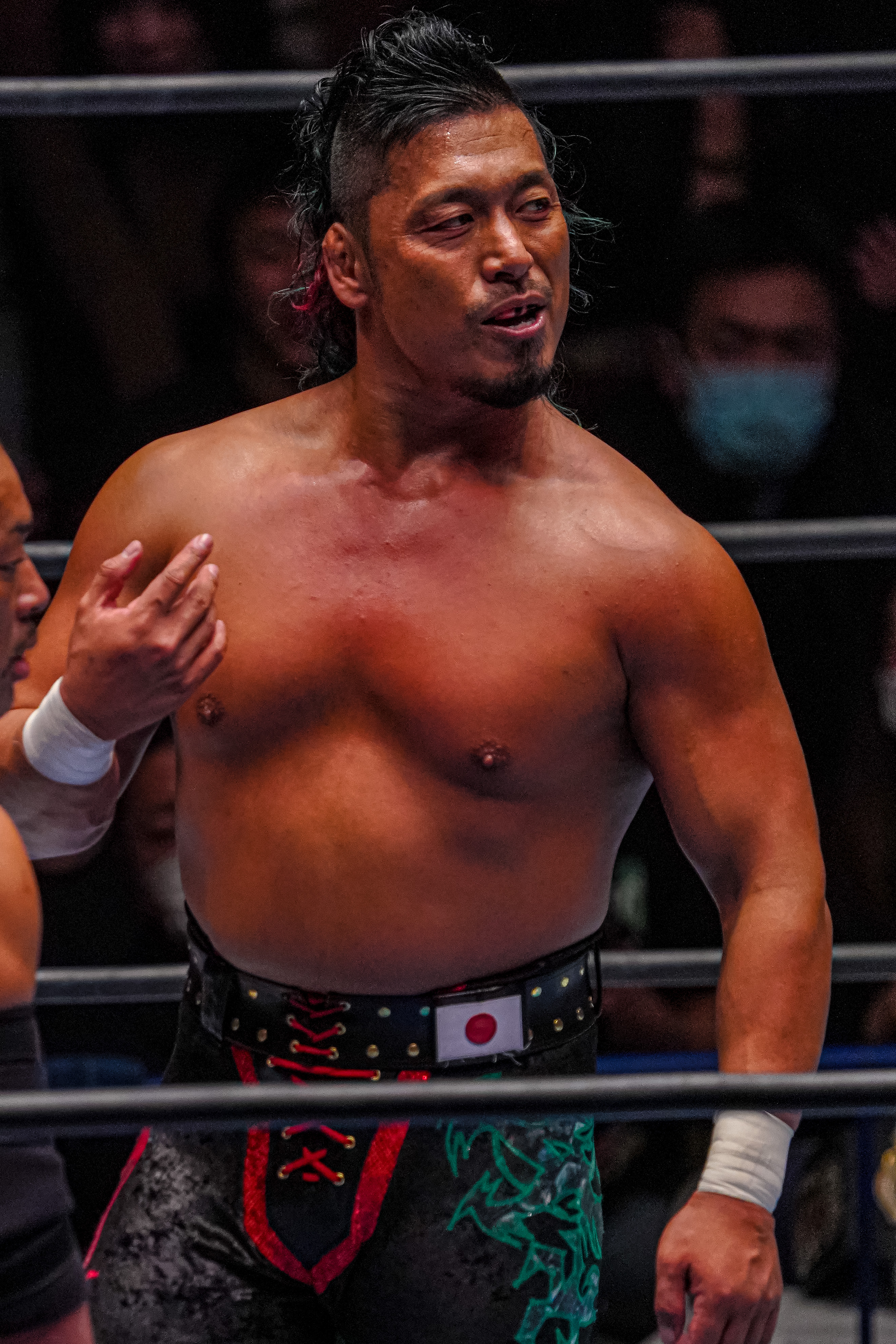
Five-time and longest combined reigning champion Shingo Takagi.

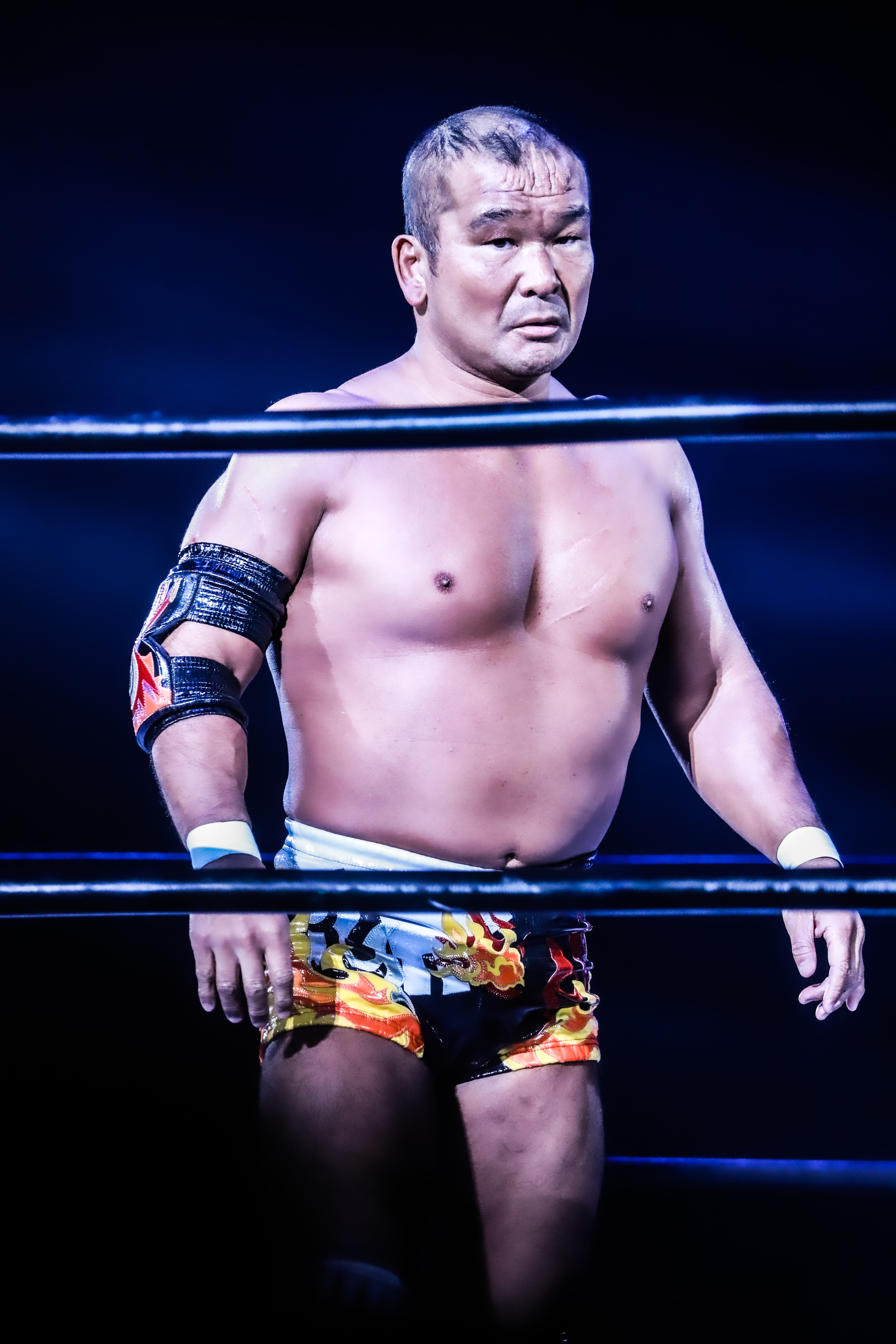
Inaugural champion Masato Tanaka holds the record for longest reign at 314 days

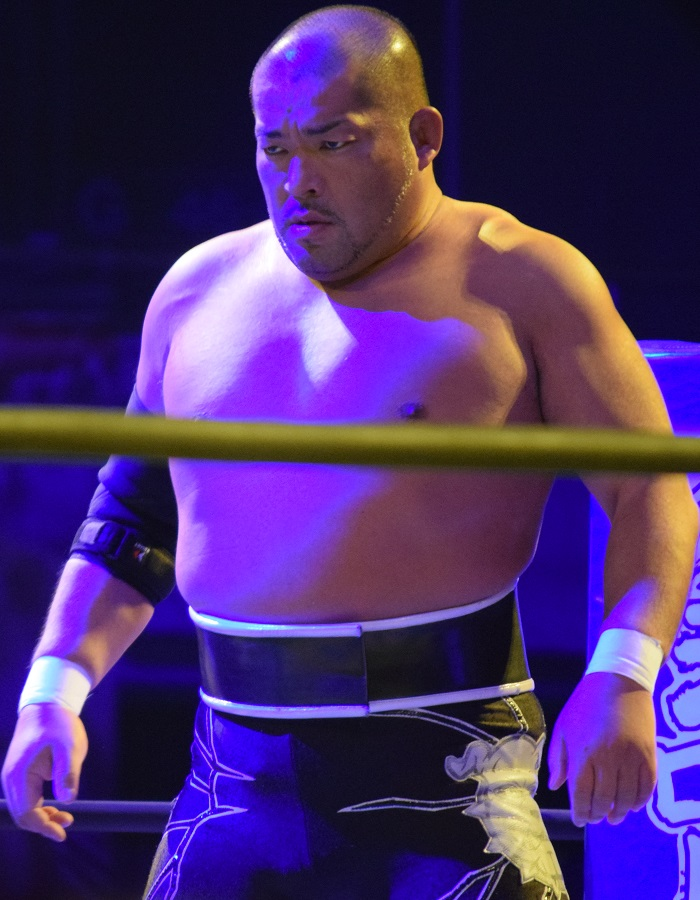
Record six-time champion Tomohiro Ishii.

†	Indicates the current champion

Rank	Wrestler	No. of reigns	Combined defenses	Combined days
1	Shingo Takagi	5	9	530
2	Tomohiro Ishii	6	6	514
3	Hirooki Goto	5	7	424
4	Minoru Suzuki	2	4	322
5	Masato Tanaka	1	4	314
6	Katsuyori Shibata	3	6	309
7	Evil	4	3	287
8	Togi Makabe	2	2	207
9	Karl Anderson	1	2	206
10	Aaron Wolf †	2	1	198+
11	Tama Tonga	4	1	196
12	Jay White	1	1	194
13	Konosuke Takeshita	1	6	162
14	David Finlay	1	1	159
15	Tetsuya Naito	1	2	135
16	Kenta	1	2	127
17	Boltin Oleg	1	2	120
18	Ren Narita	1	1	113
19	Yujiro Takahashi	1	1	106
20	Henare	1	1	105
21	Hiroshi Tanahashi	1	1	93
22	Will Ospreay	1	1	92
23	Taichi	2	0	84
24	Yuji Nagata	1	0	47
25	Jeff Cobb	1	0	27
26	Kota Ibushi	1	0	26
27	Michael Elgin	1	0	8

== See also ==
- NEVER (professional wrestling)
- NEVER Openweight 6-Man Tag Team Championship
- IWGP U-30 Openweight Championship
