= Battle in the Valley (2023) =

New Japan Pro-Wrestling pay-per-view event

- Promotional poster featuring Mercedes Moné and Kairi
- Promotion: New Japan Pro-Wrestling
- Brand: NJPW StrongNJPW Strong
- Date: February 18, 2023
- City: San Jose, California
- Venue: San Jose Civic
- Attendance: 2,155

Event chronology
← Previous; The New Beginning in Osaka	Next → All Star Junior Festival 2023

New Japan Pro-Wrestling of America chronology
← Previous; Rumble on 44th Street	Next → Multiverse United

Battle in the Valley chronology
← Previous; 2021	Next → 2024

The 2023 Battle in the Valley was a professional wrestling pay-per-view (PPV) event produced by New Japan Pro-Wrestling (NJPW). It took place on February 18, 2023, at San Jose Civic in San Jose, California. It was the second event under the Battle in the Valley chronology.

Ten matches were contested at the event, including two on the pre-show. In the main event, Kazuchika Okada defeated Hiroshi Tanahashi to retain the IWGP World Heavyweight Championship. In other prominent matches, Eddie Kingston defeated Jay White in a Loser Leaves NJPW match, Mercedes Moné defeated Kairi to win the IWGP Women's Championship, and in the opening bout, Kushida, Volador Jr., Kevin Knight and The DKC defeated Máscara Dorada, Josh Alexander, Adrian Quest and Rocky Romero.

The event featured the in-ring debut of Mercedes Moné (formerly known as Sasha Banks) in NJPW after making an appearance at Wrestle Kingdom 17, as well as wrestlers from NJPW partner promotions All Elite Wrestling (AEW), World Wonder Ring Stardom, Consejo Mundial de Lucha Libre (CMLL), and Impact Wrestling.

== Production ==
=== Background ===
In October 2019, NJPW announced their expansion into the United States with their new American division, New Japan Pro-Wrestling of America (NJoA). On July 31, 2020, NJPW announced a new weekly series titled NJPW Strong. As part of NJPW's expansion into the United States, the series would be produced by NJoA. On January 30, 2023, NJPW announced that all of the promotion's future American events would be branded under the "Strong" name. Beginning with Battle in the Valley, the NJoA PPVs began airing as NJPW Strong Live; these PPV events will later air on NJPW World as part of the NJPW Strong on Demand series.

On October 28, 2022 at Rumble on 44th Street, NJPW announced Battle in the Valley for February 18, 2023 at San Jose Civic in San Jose, California. Tickets for the event sold out while only one match, Mercedes Moné vs. Kairi, had been announced.

=== Storylines ===
Battle in the Valley features professional wrestling matches that involve different wrestlers from pre-existing scripted feuds and storylines. Wrestlers portray villains, heroes, or less distinguishable characters in the scripted events that build tension and culminate in a wrestling match or series of matches.

At night one of Wrestle Kingdom 17, after Kairi successfully retained the IWGP Women's Championship, she was confronted by a debuting Mercedes Moné. Moné then attacked Kairi before challenging her to a match for the title at Battle of the Valley, which was made official. This will be Moné's first match since May 15, 2022 (then under the ring name Sasha Banks).

At The New Beginning in Osaka, Kazuchika Okada successfully defended the IWGP World Heavyweight Championship against Shingo Takagi. After the match, Okada called out Hiroshi Tanahashi to be his next challenger for the title at Battle in the Valley, which Tanahashi accepted. This will be their first match against each other in America since night one of G1 Climax 29 in Dallas, and their first match for the title since Wrestling Dontaku 2018.

A match between Jay White and Eddie Kingston was signed for Battle in the Valley on January 19 after an altercation the two had on an episode of NJPW Strong. At The New Beginning in Osaka, White lost a Loser Leaves Japan match to Hikuleo, forcing White out of NJPW's Japanese operations. During the February 16 edition of Wrestling Observer Live, where both White and Kingston were guests on the show, the two agreed to add a Loser Leaves NJPW stipulation to their match after a heated exchange of words. The stipulation specifically states that should White lose, he would leave NJPW, and if Kingston should lose, he will not be allowed to wrestle for NJPW again without Jay White's permission.

== Event ==
=== Pre-show ===
There were two matches contested on the pre-show. In the opener, Alex Coughlin faced JR Kratos. The former won after a German suplex.

In the main event of the pre-show, Bobby Fish faced David Finlay. Fish won after hitting the Trash Panda.

=== Preliminary matches ===
The opening contest was an eight-man tag team match between Kushida, Volador Jr., The DKC and Kevin Knight; and Josh Alexander, Máscara Dorada, Adrian Quest and Rocky Romero. The former won after Knight delivered a DDT, while Alexander was trapped in the Hoverboard Lock.

Next, Fred Rosser defended the Strong Openweight Championship against Kenta. In the end, Juice Robinson came down to the ring and delivered the left hand to God, allowing Kenta to deliver the GTS for the win, and thus making Kenta the first Japanese wrestler to win the Strong Openweight Title.

Next, The Motor City Machine Guns defended the Strong Openweight Tag Team Championship against West Coast Wrecking Crew. The former won after delivering the Dirt Bomb to Royce Isaacs.

Next, Eddie Kingston faced Jay White in a Loser Leaves NJPW match. In the closing stages, Kingston delivered four spinning backfists and two Northern Light Drivers to pick up the victory. After the match, as White was addressing the fans, David Finlay attacked him from behind.

The next bout was a Filthy Rules Fight between Homicide and Tom Lawlor. In the end, Lawlor performed a rear naked choke, with Homicide's middle finger still in the air, which Homicide then passed out to.

The NJPW World Television Championship was defended in this next match between Zack Sabre Jr. and Clark Connors. In the closing stages, Connors performed different pinning variations, but to no avail. Sabre Jr. then forced him to submit to a Fujiwara armbar. After the match, Kevin Knight came out and challenged Sabre Jr. to a championship match.

The penultimate match was for the IWGP Women's Championship between Kairi and Mercedes Moné. Kairi locked in the Ikari, but Moné escaped into the Boss Statement. Kairi then delivered a spinning backfist. In the closing stages, Moné blocked the Insane Elbow, delivered a belly-to-belly suplex and hit the Moné Maker to become the new women's champion.

=== Main event ===
The main event was for the IWGP World Heavyweight Championship contested between Kazuchika Okada and Hiroshi Tanahashi. In the early stages, Tanahashi targeted Okada's knee. Tanahashi countered the Rainmaker into a ripcord lariat. As Tanahashi was looking for High Fly Flow, Okada blocked it into a dropkick, delivered an enzeguri, the Cobra Flowsion and the Rainmaker for the victory. After the match, Okada proposed that he and Tanahashi join back together to challenge for the tag team championship. As he was addressing the crowd, Moné came out and also thanked San Jose. Okada and Moné posed with the titles before leaving as the show came to an end.

== Aftermath ==
Three years later in the same city, at Forbidden Door, Jay White returned and attacked David Finlay from behind costing The Dogs (a former Bullet Club subfaction named War Dogs) their the AEW World Tag Team Championship match against Adam Copeland and Christian Cage with the help of Bang Bang Gang (formerly Bullet Club Gold) when White performed the Switchblade on Finlay, allowing Cope and Christian to retain the tag titles.

== Results ==
No.	Results	Stipulations	Times
1^{P}	Alex Coughlin defeated J. R. Kratos by pinfall	Singles match	10:07
2^{P}	David Finlay defeated Bobby Fish by pinfall	Singles match	10:06
3	Kushida, Volador Jr., Kevin Knight and The DKC defeated Máscara Dorada, Josh Alexander, Adrian Quest and Rocky Romero by pinfall	Eight-man tag team match	11:22
4	Kenta defeated Fred Rosser (c) by pinfall	Singles match for the Strong Openweight Championship	16:31
5	The Motor City Machine Guns (Alex Shelley and Chris Sabin) (c) defeated West Coast Wrecking Crew (Jorel Nelson and Royce Isaacs) by pinfall	Tag team match for the Strong Openweight Tag Team Championship	9:21
6	Eddie Kingston defeated Jay White by pinfall	Loser Leaves NJPW match Had Kingston lost, he would have needed White's permission to continue to compete in NJPW.	19:07
7	Tom Lawlor defeated Homicide by submission	Filthy Rules Fight	16:22
8	Zack Sabre Jr. (c) defeated Clark Connors by submission	Singles match for NJPW World Television Championship	14:06
9	Mercedes Moné defeated Kairi (c) by pinfall	Singles match for the IWGP Women's Championship	26:47
10	Kazuchika Okada (c) defeated Hiroshi Tanahashi by pinfall	Singles match for the IWGP World Heavyweight Championship	21:08
(c) / – the champion(s) heading into the match; P / – the match was broadcast on the pre-show

== See also ==
- 2023 in professional wrestling
- List of NJPW pay-per-view events
