= Battle in the Valley (2021) =

New Japan Pro-Wrestling pay-per-view event

- Promotion: New Japan Pro-Wrestling
- Date: November 13, 2021
- City: San Jose, California
- Venue: San Jose Civic
- Attendance: 1,655

Event chronology
← Previous; Power Struggle	Next → World Tag League/Best of the Super Jr. 28; Wrestle Kingdom 16

New Japan Pro-Wrestling of America chronology
← Previous; Resurgence; NJPW Strong: Autumn Attack	Next → —

Battle in the Valley chronology
← Previous; First	Next → 2023

Battle in the Valley was a professional wrestling pay-per-view (PPV) event produced by New Japan Pro-Wrestling (NJPW). It took place on November 13, 2021, at San Jose Civic in San Jose, California. It was the inaugural event under the Battle in the Valley chronology.

== Production ==
Other on-screen personnel
Role:	Name:
English Commentators	Kevin Kelly
English Commentators	Alex Koslov
Japanese Commentators	Shinpei Nogami
Japanese Commentators	Milano Collection A.T.
Japanese Commentators	Katsuhiko Kanazawa
Japanese Commentators	Kazuyoshi Sakai
Japanese Commentators	Togi Makabe
Japanese Commentators	Miki Motoi
Japanese Commentators	Jushin Thunder Liger
Japanese Commentators	Masahiro Chono
Ring announcers	Makoto Abe
Ring announcers	Kimihiko Ozaki
Referees	Kenta Sato
Referees	Marty Asami
Referees	Red Shoes Unno

=== Background ===
In October 2019, NJPW announced their expansion into the United States with their new American division, New Japan Pro-Wrestling of America. On August 14, 2021 at Resurgence, NJPW announced Battle in the Valley for November 13 at San Jose Civic in San Jose, California. The event saw the NJPW debuts of Buddy Matthews and Jonah, and Kazuchika Okada making his first US appearance since 2019.

=== Storylines ===
Battle in the Valley featured professional wrestling matches that involve different wrestlers from pre-existing scripted feuds and storylines. Wrestlers portrayed villains, heroes, or less distinguishable characters in the scripted events that built tension and culminated in a wrestling match or series of matches.

== Results ==
No.	Results	Stipulations	Times
1^{D}	Bullet Club (Chris Bey and Hikuleo) defeated The DKC and Kevin Knight	Tag team match	8:35
2	Josh Alexander defeated Yuya Uemura	Singles match	11:44
3	Stray Dog Army (Bateman and Misterioso) defeated Violence Unlimited (Brody King and Chris Dickinson)	Tag team match	10:08
4	Fred Rosser, David Finlay, Rocky Romero, Alex Coughlin and Alex Zayne defeated Team Filthy (Tom Lawlor, J. R. Kratos, Danny Limelight, Jorel Nelson and Royce Isaacs)	Ten-man tag team match	15:12
5	Clark Connors and Karl Fredericks defeated United Empire (Jeff Cobb and TJP)	Tag team match	10:00
6	Will Ospreay defeated Ren Narita	Singles match	15:43
7	Moose defeated Juice Robinson	Singles match	14:51
8	Kazuchika Okada defeated Buddy Matthews	Singles match	16:23
9	Tomohiro Ishii defeated Jay White (c)	Singles match for the NEVER Openweight Championship; Had Ishii lost, he could never challenge for the NEVER Openweight Championship again.	28:40
(c) / – the champion(s) heading into the match; D / – this was a dark match
