= Wrestle Kingdom 16 =

2022 New Japan Pro-Wrestling and Pro Wrestling Noah event

- Promotional poster for the first two days featuring various NJPW wrestlers
- Promotion(s): New Japan Pro-Wrestling; Pro Wrestling Noah (January 8)
- Date: January 4–5 and 8, 2022
- City: Tokyo, Japan; Yokohama, Japan
- Venue: Tokyo Dome; Yokohama Arena
- Attendance: Night 1: 12,047; Night 2: 6,379; Night 3: 7,077; Combined: 25,503
- Tagline(s): Beyond the Legacy! New Japan vs Noah

Event chronology
← Previous; Battle in the Valley; Road to Tokyo Dome	Next → Nemesis; NJPW 50th Anniversary Show

Wrestle Kingdom chronology
← Previous; 15	Next → 17

Wrestle Kingdom 16 was a three-day professional wrestling pay-per-view (PPV) event co-produced by the New Japan Pro-Wrestling (NJPW) and Pro Wrestling Noah (Noah) promotions. The event took place on January 4 and 5, 2022, at the Tokyo Dome, in Tokyo and January 8, at Yokohama Arena in Yokohama, Japan.

It was the 31st January 4 Tokyo Dome Show and the 16th promoted under the Wrestle Kingdom name; it was also the first time the event was held over three days and the first one to take place in Yokohama. It marked the first January 4 Tokyo Dome Show since 2007's Wrestle Kingdom I to be co-produced with another wrestling promotion.

Days 1 and 2 of the event aired on the NJPW World streaming service and via FITE TV and other PPV providers; Day 3 aired as a PPV event on AbemaTV before being archived on NJPW World and Wrestle Universe.

Promotional poster for day three of the event, which is co-promoted with Pro Wrestling Noah, featuring Kazuchika Okada, Hiroshi Tanahashi and Shingo Takagi (on the left representing NJPW) with Kaito Kiyomiya, Keiji Mutoh, and Katsuhiko Nakajima (on the right representing Noah)

== Production ==
Other on-screen personnel
Role:	Name:
English Commentators	Kevin Kelly
English Commentators	Chris Charlton
Japanese Commentators	Shinpei Nogami
Japanese Commentators	Milano Collection A.T.
Japanese Commentators	Katsuhiko Kanazawa
Japanese Commentators	Shinji Yoshino (night 1)
Japanese Commentators	Hiroki Yamazaki (night 1)
Japanese Commentators	Togi Makabe (night 1)
Japanese Commentators	Masahiro Chono (night 1)
Japanese Commentators	Kazuyoshi Sakai (night 2)
Ring announcers	Makoto Abe
Ring announcers	Kimihiko Ozaki
Referees	Kenta Sato
Referees	Marty Asami
Referees	Red Shoes Unno

=== Background ===
The January 4 Tokyo Dome Show is NJPW's biggest annual event and has been called "the largest professional wrestling show in the world outside of the United States" and the "Japanese equivalent to the Super Bowl". The show has been promoted under the Wrestle Kingdom name since 2007.

Wrestle Kingdom 16 was officially announced on September 4, 2021. It will be the first January 4 Tokyo Dome Show to be held over three days, with the third day being similar to the traditional New Year Dash!! event. The third day of the event will be held at the Yokohama Arena, marking the first time one of NJPW's January 4 shows was held outside of Tokyo. On November 20, it was announced that the third day of the event would be co-produced by the Noah promotion.

Like the previous two years, NJPW's sister promotion World Wonder Ring Stardom will have a match on January 5. The last two Stardom matches at Wrestle Kingdom were dark matches due to two promotions being on different broadcasting networks with TV Asahi and Samurai TV; but at Wrestle Grand Slam in MetLife Dome, Stardom was featured on the pre-show on both days which were broadcast live on NJPW World. On December 12, a member of each Stardom faction draw straws to determinate who would be in the match at day 2 of Wrestle Kingdom 16, which Mayu Iwatani and Starlight Kid were chosen to face Tam Nakano and Saya Kamitani in a tag team match. NJPW has announced that the match will be included on the main card.

=== Storylines ===
Wrestle Kingdom 16 featured professional wrestling matches that involved different wrestlers from pre-existing scripted feuds and storylines. Wrestlers portrayed villains, heroes, or less distinguishable characters in the scripted events that built tension and culminated in a wrestling match or series of matches.

After defending the IWGP World Heavyweight Championship against Shingo Takagi at Wrestling Dontaku, Will Ospreay was forced to relinquish the title after suffering a serious neck injury. At Dominion 6.6 in Osaka-jo Hall, Takagi defeated Kazuchika Okada to win the vacant title. Okada would later win the G1 Glimax for a third time, earning himself another opportunity against Takagi and the title at Wrestle Kingdom. Okada requested to be given the retired IWGP Heavyweight Championship belt to represent the certificate instead of a briefcase which the winners of the G1 usually received, which was granted and Okada successfully defended the certificate against Tama Tonga at Power Struggle while Takagi retained the championship in the main event against Zack Sabre Jr. Meanwhile, Ospreay made a recovery and appeared at Resurgence with a replica of the IWGP World Heavyweight Championship belt where he called himself the "real" champion and also called Takagi an interim champion. At Battle in the Valley, Opsreay called out both Takagi and Okada and challenged for the title at Wrestle Kingdom, and it was announced that he would face the winner of their match, set to take place on night 1, on night 2 of Wrestle Kingdom for the title.

On November 6, 2021, at Power Struggle, Kenta defeated IWGP United States Heavyweight champion Hiroshi Tanahashi to the win the title for the first time. After losing the title, Tanahashi requested a rematch for the belt at Wrestle Kingdom but Kenta declined, not wanting to give the ace a 'direct rematch'. In order to persuade Kenta to accept, Tanahashi offered to let Kenta pick the stipulation, hoping the sweeten the deal. On the final night of Best of Super Juniors/World Tag League Kenta appeared via video to finally accept Tanahashi's request, but only if Tanahashi agreed to a No Disqualification, Anything Goes match at Wrestle Kingdom. Tanahashi accepted and the match was signed for Night 2.

On April 9, 2017, Katsuyori Shibata suffered a subdural hematoma during his match with Okada at Sakura Genesis which he was forced to retire from in-ring competition shortly after. During his hiatus, Shibata became the head trainer at NJPW's LA Dojo in Los Angeles where he trains recruits for the promotion. At the G1 Climax 31 finals on October 21, 2021, Shibata had an unannounced 5-minute UWF Rules exhibition match with Zack Sabre Jr. which ended in a time limit draw. After the match, Shibata said he planned to return to the in-ring competition soon. At the Best of the Super Jrs. and World Tag League finals on December 15, he announced that he would make his official in-ring return on day 1 of Wrestle Kingdom 16. Shibata's opponent was not announced prior to the event. It was also announced that Shibata would participate in a catch wrestling rules match, but just before the scheduled bout, Shibata forwent the catch rules, opting to wrestle a normal singles match. It was later revealed that Shibata went off script by changing the rules of the match. This caused legitimate issues between Shibata and NJPW, which lead to the former leaving the promotion to sign with All Elite Wrestling (AEW) a year later.

== Results ==
Night 1
No.	Results	Stipulations	Times
1^{P}	Chase Owens, Cima, Minoru Suzuki, and Toru Yano won (Note: Other competitors by order of elimination: Kosei Fujita, Yuto Nakashima, Ryohei Oiwa, Taka Michinoku, Master Wato, Hiroyoshi Tenzan, Satoshi Kojima, Douki, Yoshinobu Kanemaru, Yuji Nagata, Tomoaki Honma, Bad Luck Fale, Aaron Henare, Tatsumi Fujinami, and Togi Makabe.)	19-man New Japan Ranbo to determine who will challenge for the Provisional KOPW 2022 Trophy on night 2	27:14
2	Yoh defeated Sho (with Dick Togo) by pinfall	Singles match	12:32
3	Bullet Club (Kenta, Taiji Ishimori and El Phantasmo) defeated Hiroshi Tanahashi and The Mega Coaches (Ryusuke Taguchi and Rocky Romero) by disqualification	Six-man tag team match	8:40
4	United Empire (Will Ospreay, Great-O-Khan, and Jeff Cobb) defeated Los Ingobernables de Japon (Tetsuya Naito, Sanada, and Bushi) by pinfall	Six-man tag team match	9:27
5	Katsuyori Shibata defeated Ren Narita by pinfall	Singles match	11:46
6	Evil (with Dick Togo) defeated Tomohiro Ishii (c) by pinfall	Singles match for the NEVER Openweight Championship	12:10
7	Chaos (Hirooki Goto and Yoshi-Hashi) defeated Dangerous Tekkers (Taichi and Zack Sabre Jr.) (c) (with Miho Abe) by pinfall	Tag team match for the IWGP Tag Team Championship	15:27
8	El Desperado (c) defeated Hiromu Takahashi by pinfall	Singles match for the IWGP Junior Heavyweight Championship	16:18
9	Kazuchika Okada defeated Shingo Takagi (c) by pinfall	Singles match for the IWGP World Heavyweight Championship	35:44
(c) / – the champion(s) heading into the match; P / – the match was broadcast on the pre-show

Night 2
No.	Results	Stipulations	Times
1^{P}	Yuji Nagata and Great Bash Heel (Togi Makabe and Tomoaki Honma) defeated Bullet Club (Bad Luck Fale, Gedo and Jado) by pinfall	Six-man tag team match	6:40
2^{P}	Master Wato and Tencozy (Hiroyoshi Tenzan and Satoshi Kojima) defeated Suzuki-gun (El Desperado, Yoshinobu Kanemaru and Taka Michinoku) by submission	Six-man tag team match	9:23
3^{P}	Los Ingobernables de Japon (Shingo Takagi, Bushi and Hiromu Takahashi) defeated Suzuki-gun (Taichi, Zack Sabre Jr. and Douki) by pinfall	Six-man tag team match	10:28
4	Flying Tiger (Robbie Eagles and Tiger Mask) (c) defeated The Mega Coaches (Ryusuke Taguchi and Rocky Romero) and Bullet Club's Cutest Tag Team (Taiji Ishimori and El Phantasmo) by submission	Three-way tag team match for the IWGP Junior Heavyweight Tag Team Championship	12:07
5	Tam Nakano and Saya Kamitani defeated Mayu Iwatani and Starlight Kid by pinfall	Stardom exhibition tag team match	9:14
6	Minoru Suzuki defeated Chase Owens, Cima and Toru Yano by pinfall	Four-way match for the Provisional KOPW 2022 Trophy	6:08
7	House of Torture (Evil, Yujiro Takahashi and Sho) (c) (with Dick Togo) defeated Chaos (Hirooki Goto, Yoshi-Hashi and Yoh) by pinfall	Six-man tag team match for the NEVER Openweight 6-Man Tag Team Championship	9:37
8	Sanada defeated Great-O-Khan by pinfall	Singles match	13:21
9	Tetsuya Naito defeated Jeff Cobb by pinfall	Singles match	15:34
10	Hiroshi Tanahashi defeated Kenta (c) by pinfall	No disqualification match for the IWGP United States Heavyweight Championship	22:40
11	Kazuchika Okada (c) defeated Will Ospreay by pinfall	Singles match for the IWGP World Heavyweight Championship	32:52
(c) / – the champion(s) heading into the match; P / – the match was broadcast on the pre-show

Night 3
No.	Results	Stipulations	Times
1^{P}	Kosei Fujita vs. Yasutaka Yano ended in a time limit draw	Singles match	10:00
2^{P}	Tencozy (Hiroyoshi Tenzan and Satoshi Kojima) and Yuji Nagata defeated Funky Express (King Tany, Muhammad Yone and Akitoshi Saito) by pinfall	Six-man tag team match	12:18
3	Chaos (Tomohiro Ishii, Hirooki Goto and Yoshi-Hashi) and Six or Nine (Master Wato and Ryusuke Taguchi) defeated Daisuke Harada, Hajime Ohara, Daiki Inaba, Yoshiki Inamura, and Kinya Okada by submission	Ten-man tag team match	11:42
4	Sho defeated Atsushi Kotoge by pinfall	Singles match	8:20
5	Stinger (Hayata and Seiki Yoshioka) defeated Bullet Club (Taiji Ishimori and Gedo) by pinfall	Tag team match	5:59
6	Suzuki-gun (El Desperado and Douki) defeated Los Perros del Mal de Japón (Yo-Hey and Nosawa Rongai) by pinfall	Tag team match	9:09
7	Sugiura-gun (Takashi Sugiura and Kazushi Sakuraba) and Toru Yano defeated Suzuki-gun (Taichi, Minoru Suzuki and Taka Michinoku) by pinfall	Six-man tag team match	9:37
8	Go Shiozaki and Masa Kitamiya defeated House of Torture (Evil and Dick Togo) by pinfall	Tag team match	9:53
9	Naomichi Marufuji and Yoshinari Ogawa defeated Suzuki-gun (Zack Sabre Jr. and Yoshinobu Kanemaru) by pinfall	Tag team match	15:20
10	Los Ingobernables de Japón (Tetsuya Naito, Shingo Takagi, Sanada, Bushi, and Hiromu Takahashi) defeated Kongo (Katsuhiko Nakajima, Kenoh, Manabu Soya, Tadasuke, and Aleja) by pinfall	Ten-man tag team match	26:33
11	Kazuchika Okada and Hiroshi Tanahashi defeated Keiji Mutoh and Kaito Kiyomiya by pinfall	Tag team match	24:34
P / – the match was broadcast on the pre-show

== See also ==
- 2022 in professional wrestling
- List of NJPW pay-per-view events
- Professional wrestling at the Tokyo Dome
