= Jay White =

New Zealand professional wrestler (born 1992)

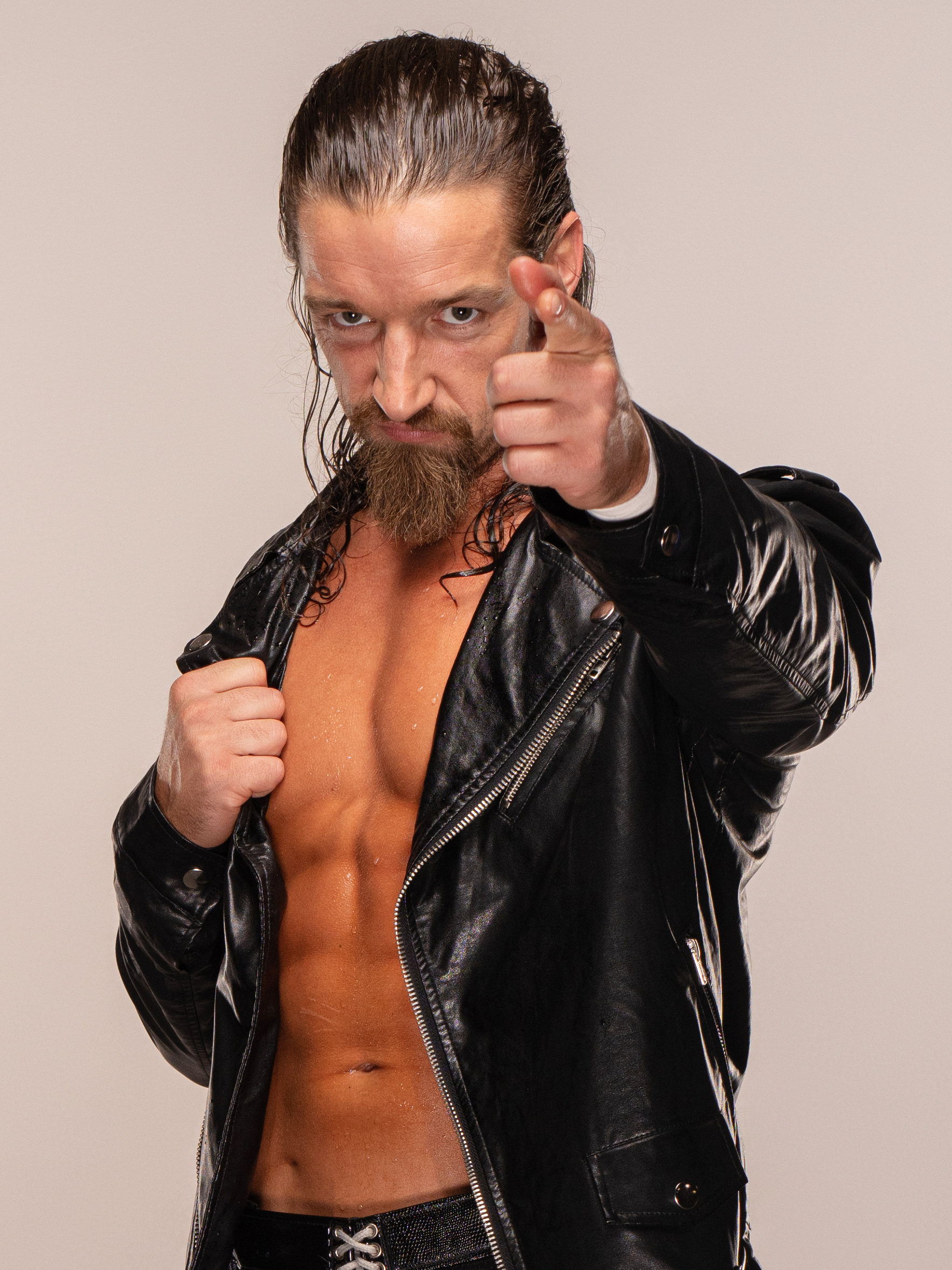
- White in 2023

Personal information
- Born: Jamie White; 9 October 1992 (age 34) Auckland, New Zealand
- Education: Orewa College
- Spouse: Savanna Price (m. 2022)

Professional wrestling career
- Ring name: Jay White
- Billed height: 186 cm (6 ft 1 in)
- Billed weight: 101 kg (223 lb)
- Billed from: Auckland, New Zealand
- Trained by: The UK Kid; NJPW Dojo; Yuji Nagata; Hiroyoshi Tenzan
- Debut: 19 February 2013

Jamie White (born 9 October 1992), better known by the ring name Jay White, is a New Zealand professional wrestler. He is signed to All Elite Wrestling (AEW), where he is the leader of The Cut stable.

Prior to signing with AEW, White had a decorated career in New Japan Pro-Wrestling (NJPW) having joined the promotion in 2014 as a Young Lion. In June 2016, White left for an overseas excursion, in which he worked for American promotion Ring of Honor (ROH) and British promotion Revolution Pro Wrestling (RPW) through NJPW's international partnerships. White returned to NJPW in November 2017 and won the IWGP United States Heavyweight Championship the following January. In 2018, he betrayed his fellow Chaos stablemates to join Bullet Club, and becoming the group's fourth leader. White is also a former two-time IWGP Heavyweight Champion, IWGP Intercontinental Champion, and NEVER Openweight Champion, making him the sixth NJPW Triple Crown Champion and the first NJPW Grand Slam Champion. He joined AEW in 2023, forming the Bang Bang Gang and winning the AEW World Trios Championship with fellow stablemates Austin Gunn and Colten Gunn. He would later rebrand the stable as The Cut in 2026.

== Professional wrestling career ==
=== Early career (2013–2014) ===
White initially trained under The UK Kid at Varsity Pro Wrestling in early 2013, and made his professional debut on 19 February, working for VPW as well as All Star Wrestling, among other promotions. In an interview on Chris Jericho's podcast, White acknowledged that he was able to train in the UK because he held a Dutch passport. Being a citizen of the Netherlands allowed him access to the UK, which was a part of the EU at the time. In early 2014, White met New Japan Pro-Wrestling (NJPW)'s Prince Devitt and competed alongside him in a tag team match for VPW. After the match, Devitt gave White his card and told him to keep in touch.

Shortly thereafter, White was contacted by Bad Luck Fale, who said that Devitt had spoken to NJPW officials about White and that he could get him a place as a young lion in the dojo if he wanted it.

Several months later, White met with Fale, Devitt, and Shinsuke Nakamura in London, where White accepted their offer and began finalizing his visa to leave for the NJPW Dojo.

=== New Japan Pro-Wrestling (2015–2023; 2026) ===
==== Young Lion and foreign excursion (2015–2017) ====
White left for Japan on New Year's Eve 2015, began further training as a young lion upon his arrival, and made his debut for NJPW on 30 January 2015, losing to Alex Shelley. White lost all but eight of his matches in 2015, as is common for young lions in NJPW. In 2016, White began gaining more victories, and on 27 March competed in his biggest match to date when he was defeated by then-reigning IWGP Intercontinental Champion Kenny Omega in a non-title match. White's final match in NJPW took place on 19 June 2016 at Dominion 6.19 in Osaka-jo Hall, when he, David Finlay, and Juice Robinson were defeated by Satoshi Kojima, Hiroyoshi Tenzan, and Manabu Nakanishi. White left for his excursion to the United States the following week.

==== Chaos (2017–2018) ====
On 5 November 2017, at Power Struggle, White returned to NJPW as the mysterious "Switchblade." He had been teased for the past several months, challenging Hiroshi Tanahashi to a match for the IWGP Intercontinental Championship at Wrestle Kingdom 12 in Tokyo Dome, before attacking him. The following day, NJPW officially announced the match between Tanahashi and White for Wrestle Kingdom 12. On 4 January, White was defeated by Tanahashi in the title match.

On 5 January, Jay teased joining Bullet Club; however, White then betrayed Kenny Omega by attacking him with a Blade Runner. A day later, he joined the Chaos faction in order to face off against Bullet Club and Kenny Omega, claiming he needed backup in his fight against Bullet Club. On 28 January at The New Beginning in Sapporo, White defeated Omega to become the second IWGP United States Heavyweight Champion in the title's history. On 25 March, he went on to defend the title for the first time against Hangman Page at NJPW Strong Style Evolved Event in Long Beach, California. White would make his second successful title defence against David Finlay at Road to Dontaku. White would make his third defense of the title beating Punishment Martinez on night 2 of the ROH/NJPW War of the Worlds Tour in May.

At Dominion 6.9 in Osaka-jo Hall, White was pinned in a tag team match by Juice Robinson. Because of this, White defended and lost the title to Juice at the G1 Special in San Francisco, ending his reign at 160 days and three successful title defenses. White then competed in 2018 G1 Climax, where he competed in the A Block, where he ended with 12 points (six wins and three losses). In the tournament, he scored major wins over the leader of Chaos, Kazuchika Okada, as well as eventual winner Hiroshi Tanahashi, notably being the only person to defeat Tanahashi in the tournament.

==== Bullet Club leader (2018–2023) ====
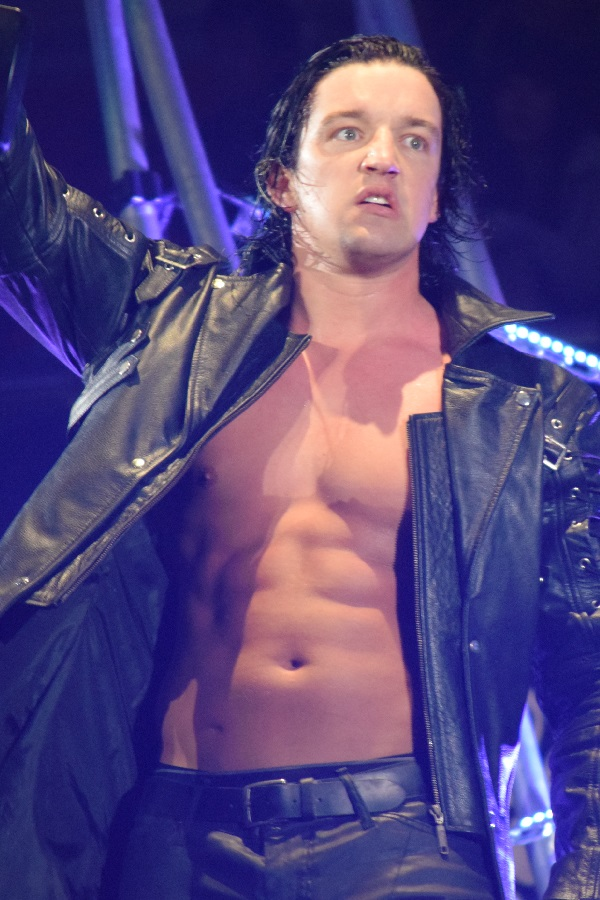
White in November 2017

At Destruction, White attacked Tanahashi after his defense of his G1 briefcase. He then attacked Okada, and Okada's former manager Gedo ran out to apparently save Okada. However, he turned on him by hitting him with a chair, and aligning himself with White. On 8 October, at King Of Pro Wrestling, White was defeated by Hiroshi Tanahashi. After the match, he and Gedo attacked Tanahashi, only for Okada to stop it. They were soon joined by Jado and Bullet Club OG in what turned out to be a setup to attack Okada, with White, Gedo and Jado all completing their defection from Chaos to join Bullet Club, becoming the new leader of the faction. At Wrestle Kingdom 13 on 4 January 2019, White defeated Okada.

At New Year Dash!!, White would defeat Tanahashi in a 6-Man Tag match and would challenge Tanahashi for his newly won IWGP Heavyweight Championship at The New Beginning in Osaka. At the event, he defeated Tanahashi to win his first world title. At the NJPW Anniversary Event in March, White defeated NEVER Openweight Champion Will Ospreay in a non-title champion vs. champion match. At the G1 Supercard on 6 April, Okada defeated White for the IWGP Heavyweight Championship, ending his reign at 54 days and no successful title defenses. White then entered the 2019 G1 Climax, competing in the B Block. Despite losing his first three matches against Hirooki Goto, Tomohiro Ishii and Toru Yano, White would make a comeback and win his next five matches against Jeff Cobb, Shingo Takagi, Taichi, Jon Moxley (being the first person to beat Moxley by pinfall) and Juice Robinson. He would then defeat Tetsuya Naito to win the B Block and advance to the tournament finals. However, he would be unsuccessful in winning the tournament after losing to A Block winner Kota Ibushi, finishing with an overall record of 12 points (six wins and three losses). In the main event of Destruction in Kobe on 22 September, White defeated Naito to win the IWGP Intercontinental Championship for the first time in his career in the main event. At Power Struggle on 3 November, White successfully defended the Intercontinental Championship against Hirooki Goto. However, he lost the championship back to Naito at Wrestle Kingdom 14 on 4 January 2020, ending his reign at 104 days. He followed this with a victory over Kota Ibushi the next day he then defeated Sanada at The New Beginning in Osaka on 9 February.

After an absence due to the COVID-19 pandemic, White returned on 21 August episode of Strong, teaming with Bullet Club partner Chase Owens in a loss to Villain Enterprises (Brody King and Flip Gordon). He then participated in the 2020 G1 Climax in the A Block, which he ended with 12 points (six wins and three losses). At Power Struggle, White defeated Kota Ibushi to become the first wrestler to win the Tokyo Dome IWGP Heavyweight and Intercontinental Championships challenge rights certificate from the G1 Climax winner.

At Wrestle Kingdom 15, White lost to Ibushi, who had won the IWGP Heavyweight and Intercontinental Championships from previous champion Tetsuya Naito. During a press conference with the company on 5 January, White expressed his desire to quit NJPW after New Year Dash!!, stating that he was "as close to death as he had ever been, and he would hopefully ever be." At New Year's Dash the following day, White participated in a ten-tag team match with Bullet Club teammates Bad Luck Fale, Chase Owens, Evil, and Yujiro Takahashi, against Chaos members Yoshi-Hashi, Tomohiro Ishii, Kazuchika Okada, Hirooki Goto and Toru Yano, which they lost after Ishii pinned White. After a month long hiatus, White returned on 1 February on the Road to the New Beginning show, attacking Ishii and continuing their feud. At Castle Attack on 27 February, White defeated Ishii. White went on to feud with Hiroshi Tanahashi, from whom he won the NEVER Openweight Championship at Wrestling Dontaku 2021, making White the sixth man to win the New Japan Triple Crown and the first New Japan Grand Slam champion. On 13 November 2021, at Battle in the Valley Jay White lost the NEVER Openweight Championship to Tomohiro Ishii ending his reign at 194 days with 1 successful defense

White returned to Japan on 1 May, at Wrestling Dontaku, attacking reigning IWGP Heavyweight Champion Kazuchika Okada after his match against Tetsuya Naito, challenging Okada to a match. At Dominion 6.12 in Osaka-jo Hall, White defeated Okada to win the Heavyweight Championship for the second time. After the match, White celebrated with the rest of Bullet Club and demanded respect for him being the "creator" of All Elite Wrestling, referring to him beating AEW Vice President Kenny Omega for the IWGP United States Heavyweight Championship at The New Beginning in Sapporo which was near the end of Omega's tenure with NJPW before joining AEW. He also insulted "Hangman" Adam Page, who had called out former champion Okada on Dynamite earlier that week, teasing confrontation leading up to AEW×NJPW: Forbidden Door. Also at the event, White was announced to be a part of the G1 Climax 32 tournament in July, where he would compete in the B Block. Initially, White went undefeated for 5 straight matches, however a loss to former Bullet Club stablemate Tama Tonga on the block finals day, caused White to be eliminated from the tournament, finishing with 10 points and failing to advance to the semi-finals. This result led to Tonga receiving a shot at the IWGP Heavyweight title on 10 October at Declaration of Power, though at the event White retained the championship. At Wrestle Kingdom 17 on 4 January 2023, at the Tokyo Dome, White lost the IWGP Heavyweight Championship back to Okada, ending his second reign at 206 days.

In a post-match press conference, White accepted his loss, although he blamed it on former Bullet club stablemate Hikuleo, who had attacked White and left the stable in September. This led to White challenging Hikuleo to a "Loser Leaves Japan Match", which took place on 11 February, where Hikuleo defeated White, forcing White to leave Japan. White was scheduled to compete against Eddie Kingston at the Battle in the Valley Event on 18 February. White has claimed that if he won this match, Gedo will join him in the United States and that he will wrestle for New Japan in the United States going forward. This Match would later be changed to a Loser Leaves New Japan Match after a heated exchange between the White and Kingston on Wrestling Observer Live. At Battle In The Valley, White was defeated by Kingston thus forcing him to leave New Japan Pro Wrestling. After the match, White was attacked by David Finlay.

==== One night return (2026) ====
On 4 January 2026 at Wrestle Kingdom 20, White made his return to NJPW as part of Hiroshi Tanahashi's retirement ceremony.

=== Ring of Honor (2016–2017) ===
Upon moving to the United States, White was first based in New Jersey, before moving to Detroit, where he lived with Alex Shelley. White debuted in Ring of Honor (ROH) at the 25 June 2016 TV tapings, defeating Kamaitachi. He teamed with The Motor City Machine Guns (Alex Shelley and Chris Sabin) to defeat Kamaitachi and The Addiction (Christopher Daniels and Frankie Kazarian). White and The Motor City Machine Guns eventually formed a stable named "Search and Destroy" with Jonathan Gresham and Lio Rush. On 8 July, White defeated Lio Rush. At the next set of TV tapings, White defeated Will Ferrara and wrestled Jay Briscoe to a time limit draw.

White debuted for England's Revolution Pro Wrestling on 12 August 2016, defeating Josh Bodom. On 19 August, White competed in a fatal four-way match against Kamaitachi, Lio Rush, and Donovan Dijak, which was won by Dijak. The following day, White and Rush were defeated by The Briscoe Brothers. White returned to RPW on 26 August, defeating Mark Haskins. On 30 September, White teamed with Kushida and ACH to defeat The Briscoes and Toru Yano in a quarter final match in the ROH Trios Tag Team Championship Tournament. White, ACH, and Kushida then defeated The Cabinet (Rhett Titus, Kenny King, and Caprice Coleman) in the semi-finals, but were defeated by The Kingdom (Matt Taven, Vinny Marseglia, and T. K. O'Ryan) in the final at Final Battle.

White competed once again for RPW on 21 January 2017, defeating Martin Stone. On 6 June, White received his biggest title opportunity in his career at the time when after winning a Battle Royal he unsuccessfully challenged Christopher Daniels for The ROH World Championship in a triple threat match. At Best in the World 2017 White, teaming with Search and Destroy defeated The Rebellion in a losers must disband match thus keeping the group together.

=== Impact Wrestling (2021–2022) ===
Through NJPW's affiliation with Impact Wrestling, White made his unannounced debut for Impact at the end of the Slammiversary event on 17 July 2021, confronting former Bullet Club leader Kenny Omega, Don Callis and former Bullet Club members The Good Brothers (Doc Gallows and Karl Anderson). Callis, Gallows and Anderson attempted to 'too sweet' White but the group was attacked by Sami Callihan, Juice Robinson and future NEVER Openweight Championship contender David Finlay, after which White hit Finlay with a bladerunner.

The following week, White confronted Gallows and Anderson, which ended in the two beating down White, until Chris Bey, who White attempted to recruit to Bullet Club following Slammiversary, made the save. On the 29 July episode of Impact, White and Bey lost to Gallows and Anderson. On the next week's episode of Impact, White accompanied Bey to his match against Juice Robinson, which Bey would win. After the match, White would hand Bey a Bullet Club shirt, officially welcoming Bey into the group. On the 12 August episode of Impact, Bullet Club (White and Bey) lost to FinJuice (David Finlay and Juice Robinson) by disqualification. on the 3 February 2022 episode of Impact, Bullet Club (Chris Bey, Jay White, Tama Tonga and Tanga Loa) defeated Ace Austin, Jake Something, Madman Fulton and Mike Bailey. At No Surrender, White defeated Eric Young. Later that night, White attacked Tama Tonga with a Blade Runner during Guerrillas of Destiny's Impact World Tag Team Championship match with The Good Brothers, allowing Gallows and Anderson to retain the titles as well as take G.o.D's place in Bullet Club.

On the 24 April 2022 episode of Impact, White returned to Impact and teamed with Chris Bey to defeat Rich Swann and Willie Mack. At Under Siege, Bullet Club (White, Chris Bey, Doc Gallows, El Phantasmo, and Karl Anderson) lost to Honor No More (Eddie Edwards, Kenny King, Matt Taven, Mike Bennett, and Vincent) in a ten match tag team match. On the 12 May episode of Impact, White and El Phantasmo lost to Josh Alexander and Tomohiro Ishii. On the 16 June episode of Impact, White and Chris Bey lost to The Briscoes (Jay Briscoe and Mark Briscoe).

=== All Elite Wrestling (2022–present) ===
==== Sporadic appearances (2022) ====
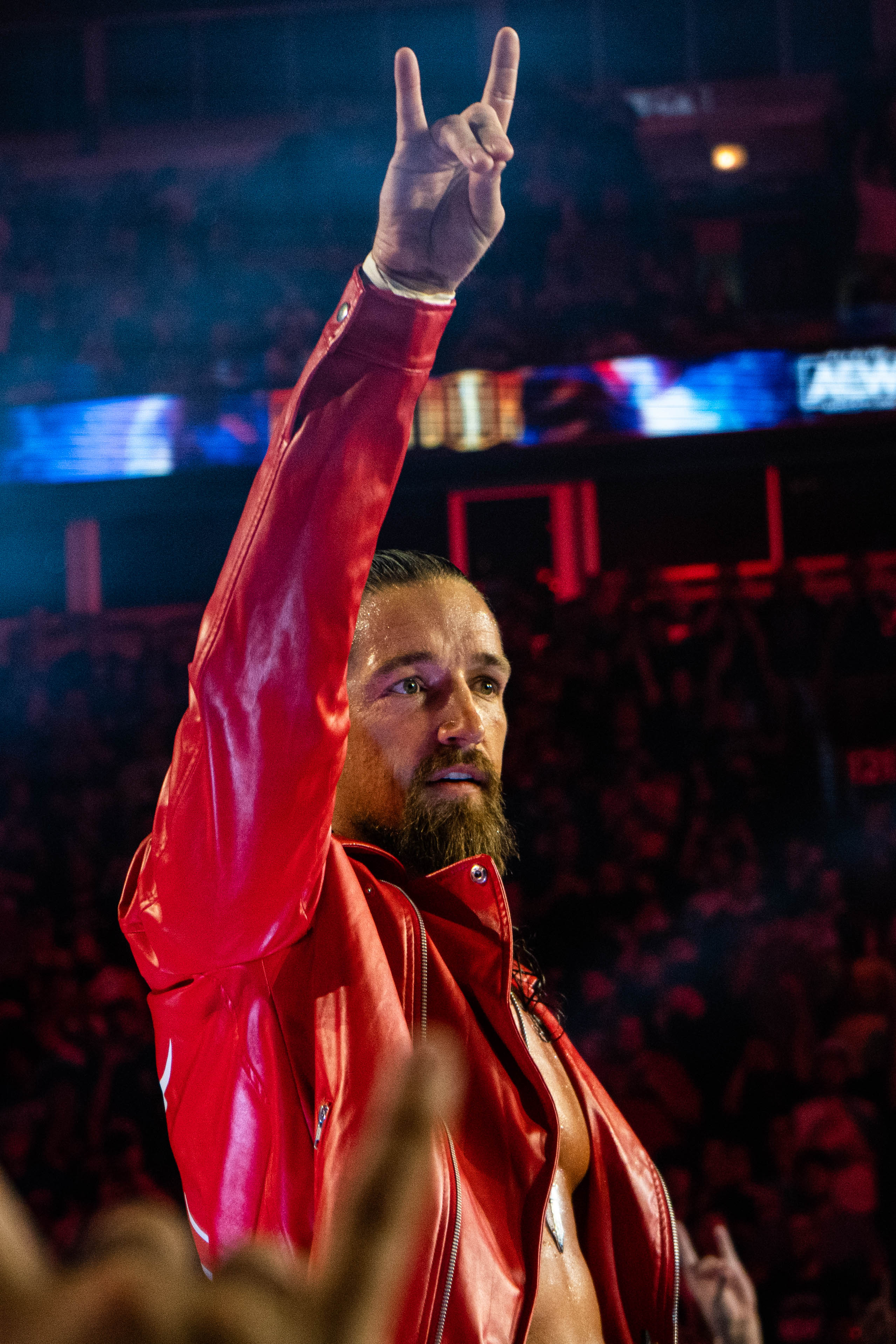
White in June 2022 at AEW x NJPW: Forbidden Door.

White appeared in AEW on the 9 February 2022, episode of Dynamite, aiding Adam Cole and The Young Bucks in beating down Roppongi Vice (Trent Beretta and Rocky Romero). The following week on Rampage, White defeated Baretta in his first AEW match. White appeared on AEW television in April and June, leading to a four-way match for his IWGP Heavyweight Championship at Forbidden Door on 22 June, which he won against Adam Page, Cole and Okada.

==== Bullet Club Gold / Bang Bang Gang (2023–2026) ====
After leaving NJPW, White appeared on the 5 April 2023 episode of Dynamite, reuniting with former Bullet Club stablemate Juice Robinson as Bullet Club Gold by aiding his attack on Ricky Starks. Shortly after, it was announced that White had officially been signed by AEW. The Gunns (Austin and Colten Gunn) began aligning with the Bullet Club Gold and soon joined the stable. On the 7 July episode of Collision, White and Robinson defeated AEW World Tag Team Champions FTR, leading to a two out of three falls championship match the following week, which they lost. At All in on 27 August, White, Robinson and Konosuke Takeshita defeated Kenny Omega, Adam Page, and Kota Ibushi. A week later at All Out, Bullet Club Gold defeated FTR and The Young Bucks in an eight-man tag match. White unsuccessfully challenged MJF for the AEW World Championship at Full Gear on 18 November. He got eliminated from the Continental Classic tournament in a three-way semifinal match against Jon Moxley and Swerve Strickland.

On 17 January 2024, White and The Gunns defeated Mogul Embassy (Brian Cage, Kaun and Toa Liona) for the ROH World Six-Man Tag Team Championship. They retained the championship at Supercard of Honor on 5 April against Monstersauce (Lance Archer and Alex Zayne) and Minoru Suzuki. Two weeks later at the Dynasty pre-show, they defeated The Acclaimed to unify the ROH and AEW World Trios Championships. White lost to Adam Page in the semi final of the Owen Hart Cup. Bullet Club Gold, now referred to as the Bang Bang Gang, were stripped of the Unified Trios Championship due to White suffering a foot injury. On the 2 October episode of Dynamite, White returned from injury and came to the aid of Robinson during an attack by Page. White faced Page at WrestleDream on 12 October and at Full Gear on 23 November and was victorious in both matches. On 28 December at Worlds End, White failed to capture the AEW World Championship from Jon Moxley in a four-way match, also involving Page and Orange Cassidy.

After Worlds End, White cemented his face turn by forming an alliance with Cope against the Death Riders. White was originally scheduled to compete in the men's bracket of the Owen Hart Cup, but suffered a hand injury that would require surgery and was written off in an off-screen attack by the Death Riders, forcing him to pull out of the tournament. He was subsequently replaced by Kevin Knight.

After over a year on hiatus, White returned at Forbidden Door on June 28, 2026, attacking his former NJPW rival David Finlay and helping Cage and Cope (Christian Cage and Adam Copeland) retain their AEW World Tag Team Championship. On July 26 at Redemption, White and Juice Robinson were defeated by The Dogs (David Finlay and Clark Connors) in a Double Chain match due to interference from members of the Death Riders. On September 26 at the Saturday Tailgate Brawl edition of All Out, White and the Bang Bang Gang defeated Finlay, Connors, the Death Riders' Daniel Garica and Wheeler Yuta in a Tornado Tailgate Brawl. After the match, it was announced that White had suffered another injury and was expected to be out of action for up to two months, but returned on October 17 on the Saturday Tailgate Brawl edition of WrestleDream, teaming with the Gunns and the Conglomeration (Orange Cassidy, Kyle O'Reilly, and Roderick Strong) in a losing effort against The Dogs and the Death Riders (Claudio Castagnoli, Daniel Garcia, Gabe Kidd, and Wheeler Yuta).

==== The Cut (2026–present) ====
On the October 21 episode of Dynamite, the Bang Bang Gang turned heel after aligning with The Dogs to attack the Death Riders and the Conglomeration. After initially naming the alliance The Last Outfit on the October 24 episode of Collision, White announced that the group would instead be known as The Cut. At Full Gear on November 14, White and his stablemates defeated the Death Rdiers and the Conglomeration in Anarchy in the Arena.

== Personal life ==
On 6 May 2022, White married longtime girlfriend Savanna Price. He holds both New Zealand and Dutch citizenship, with his grandfather being born in the Netherlands. His training and temporary residence in the United Kingdom is attributed to his Dutch passport, which allowed him to travel in Europe extensively. White's interest in wrestling was sparked in 2011 when, at the age of 19, he won a contest held by a New Zealand radio station for a trip to WrestleMania XXVII in Atlanta, Georgia.

== Championships and accomplishments ==
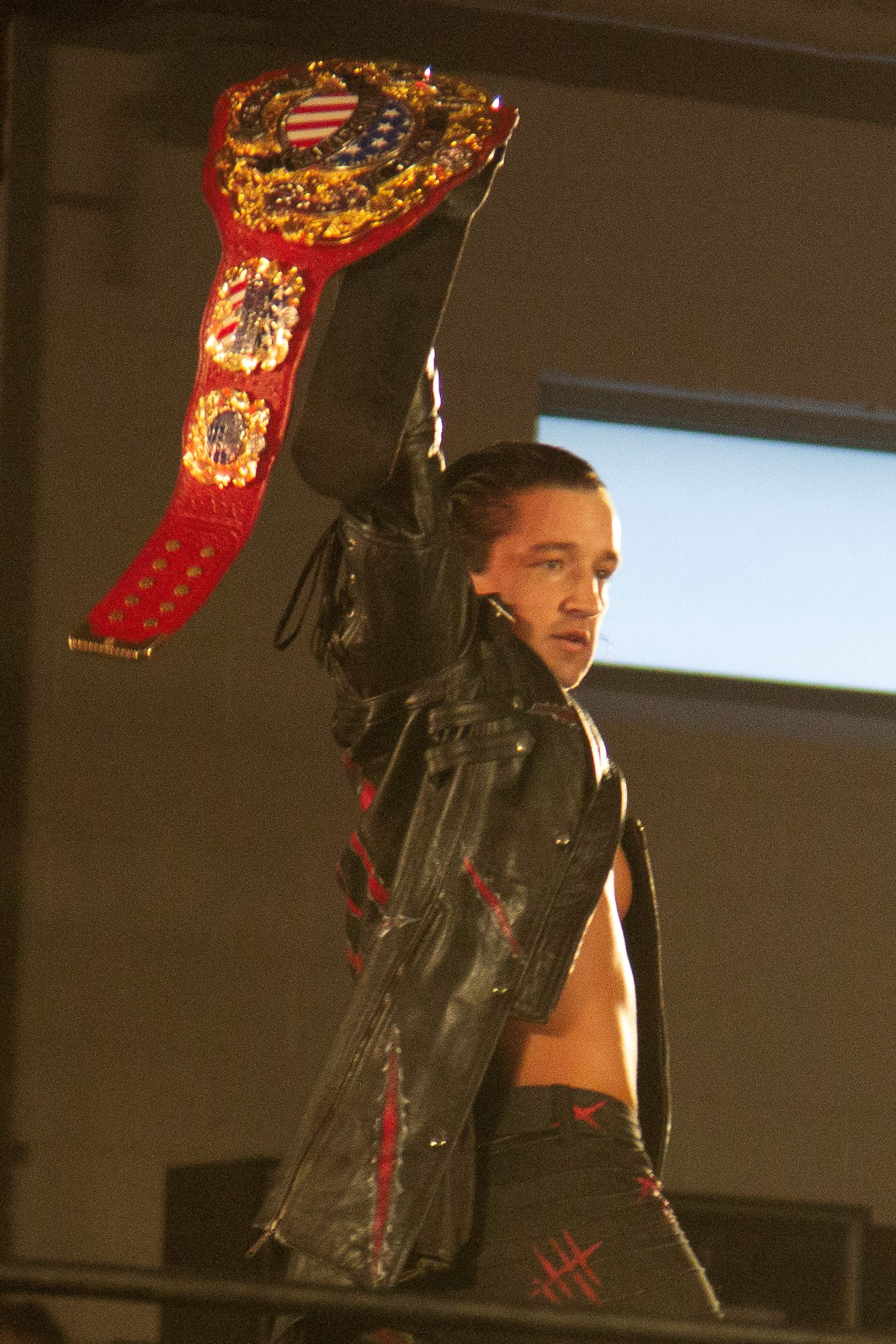
White as IWGP United States Heavyweight Champion

- All Elite Wrestling
  - AEW World Trios Championship (1 time) – with Austin Gunn and Colten Gunn
- New Japan Pro-Wrestling
  - IWGP Heavyweight Championship (Note: The title was named the IWGP Heavyweight Championship during White's first reign & IWGP World Heavyweight Championship during his second reign.) (2 times)
  - IWGP Intercontinental Championship (2 times) (Note: With the reactivation of the IWGP Heavyweight Championship and the restored and combined histories of both it, the World Heavyweight, and the Intercontinental titles, all former IWGP World Heavyweight Champions are retroactively recognized as having been an IWGP Intercontinental Champion.)
  - NEVER Openweight Championship (1 time)
  - IWGP United States Heavyweight Championship (1 time)
  - Sixth NJPW Triple Crown Champion
  - First NJPW Grand Slam Champion
- Pro Wrestling Illustrated
  - Ranked No. 12 of the top 500 singles wrestlers in the PWI 500 in 2019
- Ring of Honor
  - ROH World Six-Man Tag Team Championship (1 time) – with Austin Gunn and Colten Gunn
