= Battle in the Valley (2024) =

New Japan Pro-Wrestling pay-per-view event

- Promotional poster featuring various NJPW wrestlers
- Promotion: New Japan Pro-Wrestling
- Brand: NJPW Strong
- Date: January 13, 2024
- City: San Jose, California
- Venue: San Jose Civic
- Attendance: 2,147

Event chronology
← Previous; New Year Dash!!	Next → The New Beginning in Nagoya

Battle in the Valley chronology
← Previous; 2023	Next → 2025

Battle in the Valley was a professional wrestling pay-per-view (PPV) event produced by New Japan Pro-Wrestling (NJPW). It took place on January 13, 2024, at San Jose Civic in San Jose, California. It is the third event under the Battle in the Valley chronology. The event features wrestlers from NJPW partner promotions All Elite Wrestling (AEW), World Wonder Ring Stardom, Major League Wrestling (MLW), and Consejo Mundial de Lucha Libre (CMLL).

Eleven matches were contested at the event. In the main event, Kazuchika Okada defeated Will Ospreay. In other prominent matches, Shingo Takagi defeated Jon Moxley in a No Disqualification match and The Chosen Bros (Jeff Cobb and Matt Riddle) defeated TMDK (Bad Dude Tito and Zack Sabre Jr.)

The show was also notable for the unannounced NJPW debut of AEW performer Jack Perry, who had not appeared in a wrestling ring since his AEW suspension from his backstage brawl with CM Punk at All In 2023. At the event, he attacked Shota Umino following the main card's opening six-man tag team match; after laying Umino out, he tore up his AEW contract in the ring and donned an armband reading "scapegoat".

== Production ==
=== Background ===
In October 2019, NJPW announced their expansion into the United States with their new American division, New Japan Pro-Wrestling of America (NJoA). On July 31, 2020, NJPW announced a new weekly series titled NJPW Strong; the series would be produced by NJoA. On January 30, 2023, NJPW announced that all of the promotion's future American events would be branded under the "Strong" name. Beginning with the inaugural Battle in the Valley event, NJoA PPVs have since aired under the NJPW Strong Live banner, and later re-aired as part of the NJPW Strong on Demand series.

Tickets for the 2024 Battle in the Valley event went on sale October 6, 2023.

=== Storylines ===
Battle in the Valley features professional wrestling matches that involve different wrestlers from pre-existing scripted feuds and storylines. Wrestlers portray villains, heroes, or less distinguishable characters in the scripted events that build tension and culminate in a wrestling match or series of matches.

== Results ==
No.	Results	Stipulations	Times
1^{P}	Matt Vandagriff defeated Goldy by pinfall	Strong Survivor match	6:09
2^{P}	Stephanie Vaquer defeated Viva Van by pinfall	Singles match to determine the #1 contender to the Strong Women's Championship	9:55
3	Jacob Fatu, Fred Rosser, and Shota Umino defeated Team Filthy (Tom Lawlor, Jorel Nelson, and Royce Isaacs) by pinfall	Six-man tag team match	8:59
4	Máscara Dorada and Volador Jr. defeated Rocky Romero and Soberano Jr. by pinfall	Tag team match	11:11
5	David Finlay defeated TJP by pinfall	Singles match	13:07
6	Guerrillas of Destiny (Hikuleo and El Phantasmo) (c) defeated Bullet Club War Dogs (Clark Connors and Alex Coughlin) by pinfall	Tag team match for the Strong Openweight Tag Team Championship	12:06
7	Giulia (c) defeated Trish Adora by pinfall	Singles match for the Strong Women's Championship	13:02
8	The Chosen Bros (Matt Riddle and Jeff Cobb) defeated TMDK (Zack Sabre Jr. and Bad Dude Tito) by pinfall	Tag team match	11:45
9	Eddie Kingston (c) vs. Gabe Kidd ended in a double countout	Singles match for the Continental Crown Championship (Strong Openweight Championship, ROH World Championship, and the AEW Continental Championship)	11:22
10	Jon Moxley defeated Shingo Takagi by pinfall	No Disqualification match	26:16
11	Kazuchika Okada defeated Will Ospreay by pinfall	Singles match	28:34
(c) / – the champion(s) heading into the match; P / – the match was broadcast on the pre-show

== See also ==
- 2024 in professional wrestling
- List of NJPW pay-per-view events
