= Battle in the Valley (2025) =

New Japan Pro-Wrestling pay-per-view event

- Promotional poster featuring various NJPW wrestlers
- Promotion: New Japan Pro-Wrestling
- Brand: NJPW Strong
- Date: January 11, 2025
- City: San Jose, California
- Venue: San Jose Civic
- Attendance: 1,814

Event chronology
← Previous; New Year Dash!!	Next → The New Beginning in Osaka

Battle in the Valley chronology
← Previous; 2024	Next → —

Battle in the Valley was a professional wrestling pay-per-view (PPV) event produced by New Japan Pro-Wrestling (NJPW). It took place on January 11, 2025, at San Jose Civic in San Jose, California. It is the fourth event under the Battle in the Valley chronology. The event features wrestlers from NJPW partner promotions All Elite Wrestling (AEW), World Wonder Ring Stardom, and Consejo Mundial de Lucha Libre (CMLL).

Ten matches were contested at the event. In the main event, El Desperado defeated Taiji Ishimori to retain the IWGP Junior Heavyweight Championship. In other prominent matches, Zack Sabre Jr. defeated Hechicero, Konosuke Takeshita defeated Kushida to retain the Never Openweight Championship, and Hiromu Takahashi, Mayu Iwatani, and Yuka Sakazaki defeated Sumie Sakai and House of Torture (Evil and Sho) in a Six-person tag team match. This was Sakai's retirement match.

== Production ==
=== Background ===
The show features professional wrestling matches that result from scripted storylines, where wrestlers portray villains, heroes, or less distinguishable characters in the scripted events that build tension and culminate in a wrestling match or series of matches.

== Results ==
No.	Results	Stipulations	Times
1^{P}	Zane Jay defeated Viento by submission	STRONG Survivor match	6:23
2^{P}	TMDK (Shane Haste and Bad Dude Tito) defeated Fred Rosser and Matt Vandagriff by pinfall	Tag team match	10:22
3	Gabe Kidd (c) vs. Tomohiro Ishii ended in a time limit draw	Singles match for the Strong Openweight Championship	30:00
4	West Coast Wrecking Crew (Royce Isaacs and Jorel Nelson) (c) defeated Roppongi ReVice (Rocky Romero and Yoh) by pinfall	Tag team match for the Strong Openweight Tag Team Championship	11:21
5	Empress Nexus Venus (Mina Shirakawa, Maika, and Hanako) and Viva Van defeated AZM, Anna Jay, Trish Adora, and Johnnie Robbie	Eight-woman tag team elimination match	13:34
6	El Phantasmo (c) vs. Jeff Cobb ended in a double count-out	Singles match for the NJPW World Television Championship	10:40
7	Mayu Iwatani, Yuka Sakazaki, and Hiromu Takahashi defeated Sumie Sakai and House of Torture (Evil and Sho) by pinfall	Six-person tag team match This was Sakai's retirement match.	15:03
8	Konosuke Takeshita (c) defeated Kushida by pinfall	Singles match for the NEVER Openweight Championship	15:07
9	Zack Sabre Jr. defeated Hechicero by pinfall	Singles match	23:40
10	El Desperado (c) defeated Taiji Ishimori by pinfall	Singles match for the IWGP Junior Heavyweight Championship	20:44
(c) / – the champion(s) heading into the match; P / – the match was broadcast on the pre-show
