= San Jose Civic =

Building in California, United States

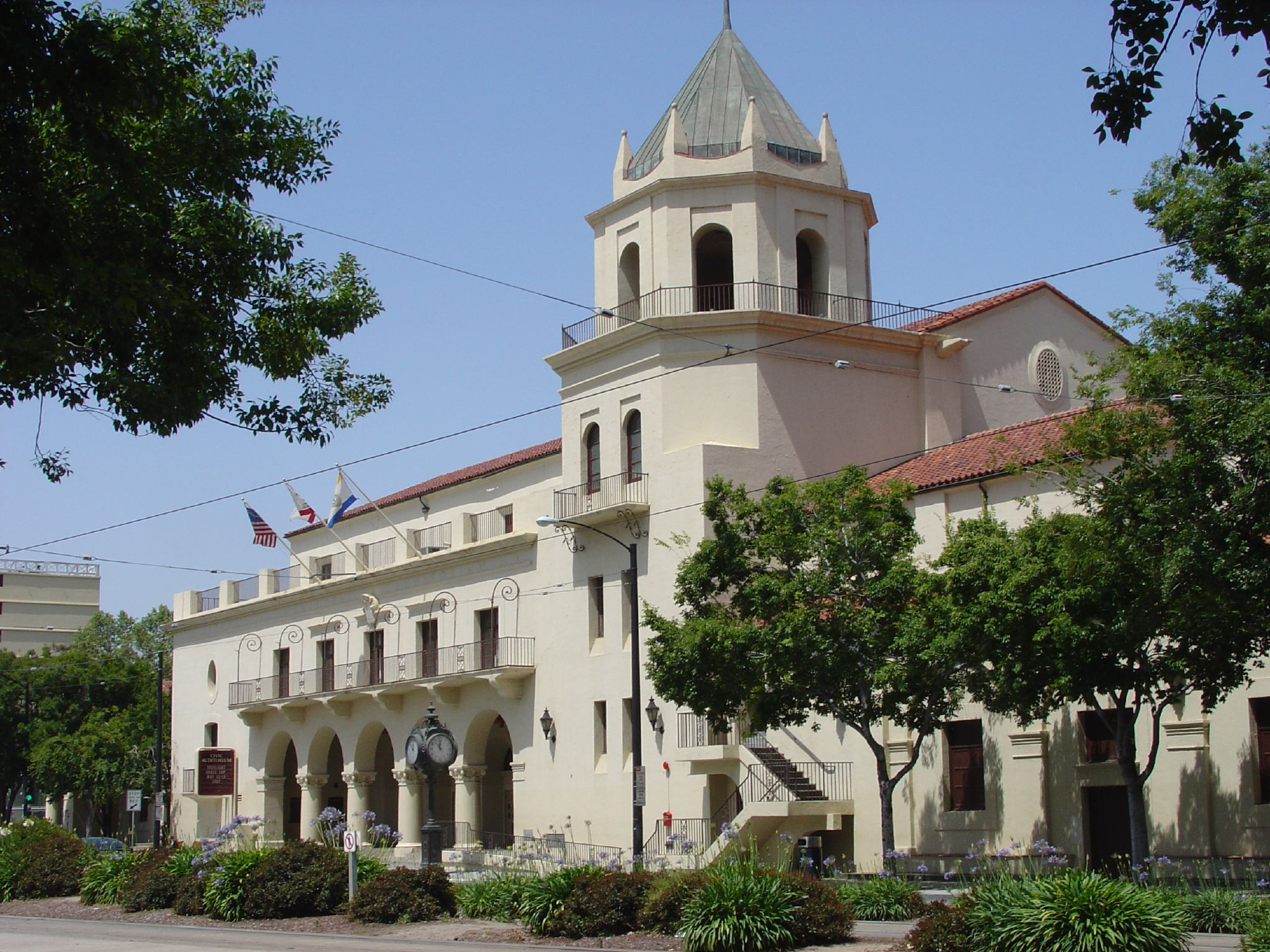
- Exterior of the Civic & Montgomery Theater in 2017
- Interactive map of San Jose Civic
- Former names: San Jose Municipal Auditorium (planning/construction); San Jose Civic Auditorium (1933–2013); City National Civic (2013–19)
- Address: 135 W San Carlos St; San Jose, CA 95113
- Location: Downtown San Jose
- Coordinates: 37.330987°N 121.890168°W
- Owner: City of San Jose
- Operator: Team San Jose; Nederlander Concerts
- Capacity: 3,036
- Public transit: Convention Center

Construction
- Groundbreaking: 1934
- Opened: July 14, 1936
- Cost: $530,515 ($12.8 million in 2025 dollars)
- Architects: Binder & Curtis
- Project managers: Worley & Company
- General contractor: Thomas Construction
- Main contractor: Swenson Construction

Tenants
- Santa Clara Broncos (NCAA) (1951–75); SJSU Spartans (NCAA) (1961–76, 1979–89); San Jose Diablos (IVA) (1979); San Jose Golddiggers (MLV) (1987–89)

Website
- Venue Website
- Building details

General information
- Renovated: 2009-12
- Renovation cost: $25 million ($37.5 million in 2025 dollars)

Renovating team
- Architect: ELS Architecture
- Other designers: National Electric Pro; Advanced Design Consultants; The Shalleck Collaborative; BBI Engineering
- Main contractor: Garden City Construction

The San Jose Civic (formerly known as the San Jose Civic Auditorium and City National Civic) is a former arena, currently operating as a theatre and concert venue, located in downtown San Jose, California. The venue is owned by the City of San Jose, is managed by Team San Jose and is booked by Nederlander Concerts. The auditorium seats 3,036 which can be expanded up to 3,326 in a general admission setting.

== History ==
The venue was created through a joint venture between the City of San Jose, Public Works Administration and local property owners Mr. and Mrs. T. S. Montgomery, who donated the property. The building was designed by Binder & Curtis, in the Spanish Colonial/California Mission Revival style.

The venue's naming rights were given to City National Bank in December 2013, with its original name being restored in May 2019.

The west wing was a convention hall called "Parkside Hall". It opened on September 22, 1977, as the "San Jose Convention Center". It served as the city's main convention center until a new facility of the same name opened across the street in 1989. The building was demolished in 2019.

A $25 million renovation of the venue (approved in 2007) was begun in 2009. A state-of-the-art sound and video system was installed, the building's floor was refurbished, an exterior lighting system was activated, and the loading dock was upgraded. Key improvements planned included a top-line interior lighting system, seating upgrades to replace the decades-old plastic molded chairs, more restrooms, and a new concessions program.

=== Naming history ===
- San Jose Municipal Auditorium (1934—April 1936) (planning/construction)
- San Jose Civic Auditorium (July 14, 1936—December 3, 2013)
- City National Civic (December 4, 2013—May 14, 2019)
- San Jose Civic (May 15, 2019—present)

== Montgomery Theater ==
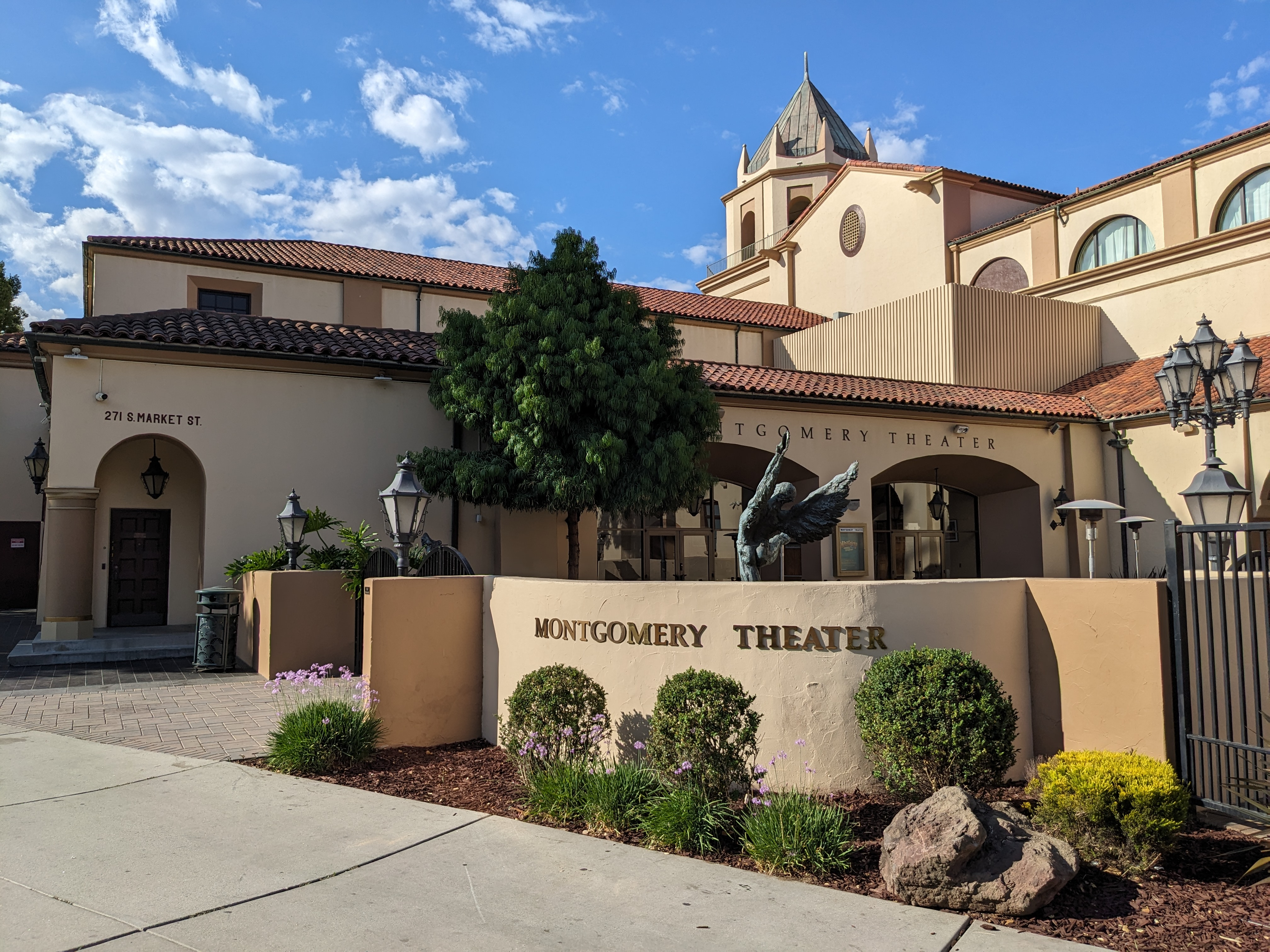
The Montgomery Theater in 2024

The "Montgomery Theater" is attached to the east side of the building. Seating 486, it is the primary home of CMT San Jose.

== Notable events ==
Many of the most popular entertainers and public figures have appeared at the venue creating memorable historic events since its opening in 1936. Barbra Streisand appeared there during her first concert tour in 1963. Bob Dylan and the Hawks played a famous show there on December 12, 1965, and Allen Ginsberg made a tape of it now held by the Stanford University Libraries. Earlier that year the Rolling Stones played a concert there that was attended by Ken Kesey and his Merry Pranksters who electrified a party afterward reportedly attended by Stones members. Richard Nixon made national headlines during an anti-war demonstration at the San Jose Civic.

It has presented major sporting events including boxing matches with champions such as Jack Dempsey and Joe Louis. The Civic hosted the final day of the GENESIS 3 Super Smash Bros. tournament in January 2016. It was the venue for the trampoline events of the inaugural World Games I in 1981.

The venue has hosted professional wrestling events dating back to 1938, when promoter Hal Moore put on his first event. The Civic Auditorium continued to host weekly events after World War II and into the 1950s. Starting in 2019, the venue has hosted multiple events for the Japanese based New Japan Pro-Wrestling. New Japan put on its first show in San Jose on November 9th, 2019, as one half of NJPW Showdown. The promotion returned to the Civic on November 13, 2021, for the inaugural Battle in the Valley event. Battle in the Valley would become an annual pay-per-view show at the venue starting with the 2023 event, with additional shows in 2024 and 2025. The venue would host United States based All Elite Wrestling for the first time on March 11, 2026, featuring a live television broadcast of AEW Dynamite and a taping of AEW Collision.
