= Wrestling Dontaku 2022 =

2022 New Japan Pro-Wrestling event

- Promotion: New Japan Pro-Wrestling
- Date: May 1, 2022
- City: Fukuoka, Japan
- Venue: Fukuoka PayPay Dome
- Attendance: 8,162

Event chronology
← Previous; Windy City Riot; Golden Fight Series	Next → Capital Collision

Wrestling Dontaku chronology
← Previous; 2021	Next → 2023

Wrestling Dontaku 2022 was a professional wrestling event promoted by New Japan Pro-Wrestling (NJPW). It was held on May 1, 2022, in Fukuoka, at the Fukuoka PayPay Dome, marking the first time that Wrestling Dontaku was held at the venue since 2001.

== Storylines ==
Wrestling Dontaku featured eight professional wrestling matches that involved different wrestlers from pre-existing scripted feuds and storylines. Wrestlers portray villains, heroes, or less distinguishable characters in the scripted events that build tension and culminate in a wrestling match or series of matches.

== Results ==
No.	Results	Stipulations	Times
1	Suzuki-gun (Taichi, Zack Sabre Jr., and Taka Michinoku) defeated Los Ingobernables de Japon (Shingo Takagi and Bushi) and Shiro Koshinaka by pinfall	Six-man tag team match	10:15
2	Hiromu Takahashi defeated Yoh by pinfall	Singles match	9:59
3	Tanga Loa (with Jado) defeated Yujiro Takahashi by pinfall	Singles match	11:33
4	Six or Nine (Ryusuke Taguchi and Master Wato) (c) defeated Suzuki-gun (Yoshinobu Kanemaru and Douki) by pinfall	Tag team match for the IWGP Junior Heavyweight Tag Team Championship	9:10
5	Bullet Club (Bad Luck Fale and Chase Owens) defeated United Empire (Great-O-Khan and Jeff Cobb) (c) and Bishamon (Hirooki Goto and Yoshi-Hashi) by pinfall	Three-way tag team match for the IWGP Tag Team Championship	9:43
6	Tama Tonga (with Jado) defeated Evil (with Dick Togo) (c) by pinfall	Singles match for the NEVER Openweight Championship	13:25
7	Taiji Ishimori defeated El Desperado (c) by submission	Singles match for the IWGP Junior Heavyweight Championship	14:40
8	Hiroshi Tanahashi defeated Tomohiro Ishii (Note: Will Ospreay was initially scheduled to face Tanahashi but he was diagnosed with COVID-19 on April 28 and was replaced.) by pinfall	Singles match for the vacant IWGP United States Heavyweight Championship	23:20
9	Kazuchika Okada (c) defeated Tetsuya Naito by pinfall	Singles match for the IWGP World Heavyweight Championship	34:12
(c) / – the champion(s) heading into the match
