= Shingo Takagi =

Japanese professional wrestler (born 1982)

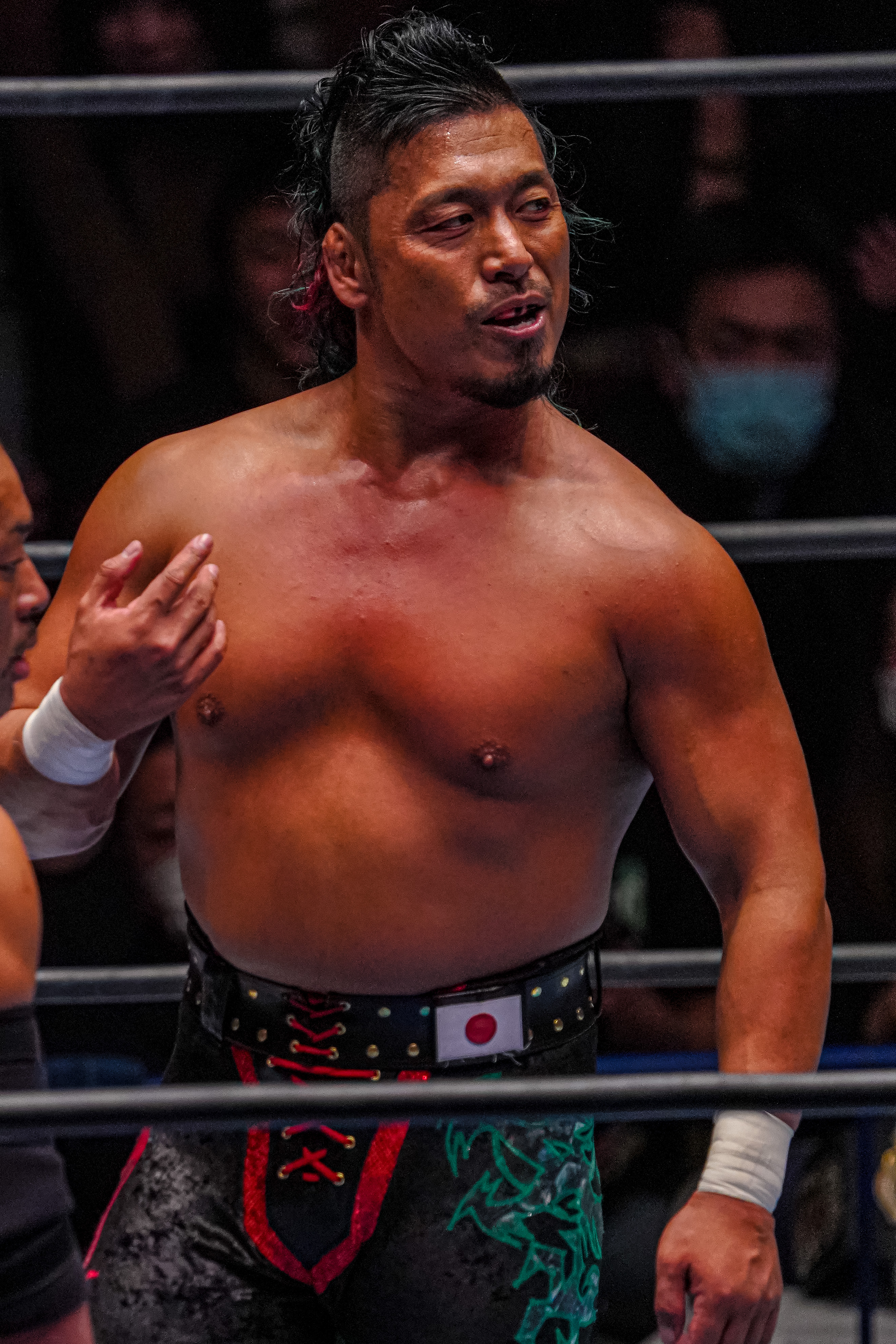
- Takagi in 2020

Personal information
- Born: Shin Takagi; November 21, 1982 (age 43) Tatomi, Nakakoma District (now Chūō), Yamanashi, Japan
- Spouse: Natsupoi (m. 2025)

Professional wrestling career
- Ring name(s): Hatsuratsu Guerrero; Shingo Takagi; Shingo
- Billed height: 1.78 m (5 ft 10 in)
- Billed weight: 100 kg (220 lb)
- Trained by: Animal Hamaguchi; Cima
- Debut: October 3, 2004

Shin Takagi (鷹木 信, Takagi Shin; born November 21, 1982), known by the ring name Shingo Takagi (鷹木信悟, Takagi Shingo), is a Japanese professional wrestler. He is signed to New Japan Pro-Wrestling (NJPW), where he is a member of the Unbound Co. stable and a former one-time IWGP Heavyweight Champion. He is also former five-time NEVER Openweight Champion and is a former member of the Los Ingobernables de Japón stable.

Takagi first became widely known for his work with Dragongate, where he competed from his debut in 2004 up until 2018. Known during his tenure as the "Pumping Hawk", he was recognized as the promotion's top heel for many years and incantations, and went on to become one of the most decorated wrestlers in the company's history, winning the Open the Dream Gate Championship, the top championship in the promotion, four times in eight years. He was also known as the leader of the New Hazard, Real Hazard, KAMIKAZE, -akatsuki-, VerserK and ANTIAS stables in Dragongate, and for his long-lasting rivalry with BxB Hulk, with whom he faced off against in several prominent events. He had his last contracted Dragongate match on October 7, 2018, where he would lose to BxB Hulk. During his time in Dragongate, he also spent an extended amount of time with American promotions such as Full Impact Pro, Pro Wrestling Guerrilla and Ring of Honor (ROH); In ROH, he became a ROH World Tag Team Champion alongside then-stablemate Naruki Doi in 2007.

On October 8, 2018, Takagi made his surprise debut in NJPW as the foreshadowed sixth member ("pareja") of the Los Ingobernables de Japón stable as "The Dragon" (not to be confused with fellow NJPW wrestler Tatsumi Fujinami, who was also known as "The Dragon"). Originally performing in the Junior Heavyweight division, he went on to be undefeated as a singles competitor and overall unpinned and unsubmitted until the BOSJ 2019 final. He also held the IWGP Junior Heavyweight Tag Team Championship once with fellow Ingobernables member Bushi from January to March 2019. Takagi moved to the Heavyweight division in June 2019, debuting at G1 Climax 29. From February to August 2020, Takagi held both the NEVER Openweight Championship and the NEVER Openweight 6-Man Tag Team Championship (with Bushi and Evil), making him the first person to hold both NEVER titles at the same time. After losing the NEVER Title in August, he regained it in November for a second time. He won the IWGP World Heavyweight Championship at Dominion 6.6 in Osaka-jo Hall in 2021.

Takagi has been praised for his wrestling abilities in both NJPW and Dragongate, to which has garnered him numerous accolades. He was recognized and voted as the "Rookie of the Year" in the Wrestling Observer Newsletter Awards in 2005. In 2021, he notably placed 9th on the Pro Wrestling Illustrated "PWI 500" list, received the MVP Award at the Tokyo Sports Puroresu Awards, and was ranked as the "Most Outstanding Wrestler" and Japanese wrestling's most valuable player by the readers of the Wrestling Observer Newsletter.

== Professional wrestling career ==
=== Dragon Gate (2004–2018) ===
Shingo Takagi debuted in October 2004 as the first graduate of the Dragon Gate dojo. He was also trained by Animal Hamaguchi. Takagi won the 2005 Wrestling Observer Rookie of the Year award.

In Dragon Gate, Takagi became a member of the Blood Generation stable. On May 10, 2007, shortly after forming the stable New Hazard, Takagi – along with BxB Hulk and Cyber Kong – defeated the Typhoon team of Cima, Susumu Yokosuka, and Ryo Saito for the Dragon Gate Open the Triangle Gate Championship. They held the championship until July 13, 2007, when the team were forced to vacate the championship as BxB Hulk had sustained a jaw injury. Takagi and Kong replaced Hulk with Jack Evans, and challenged for the vacant championship against the Muscle Outlaw'z team of Naruki Doi, Masato Yoshino, and Magnitude Kishiwada, but were unsuccessful.

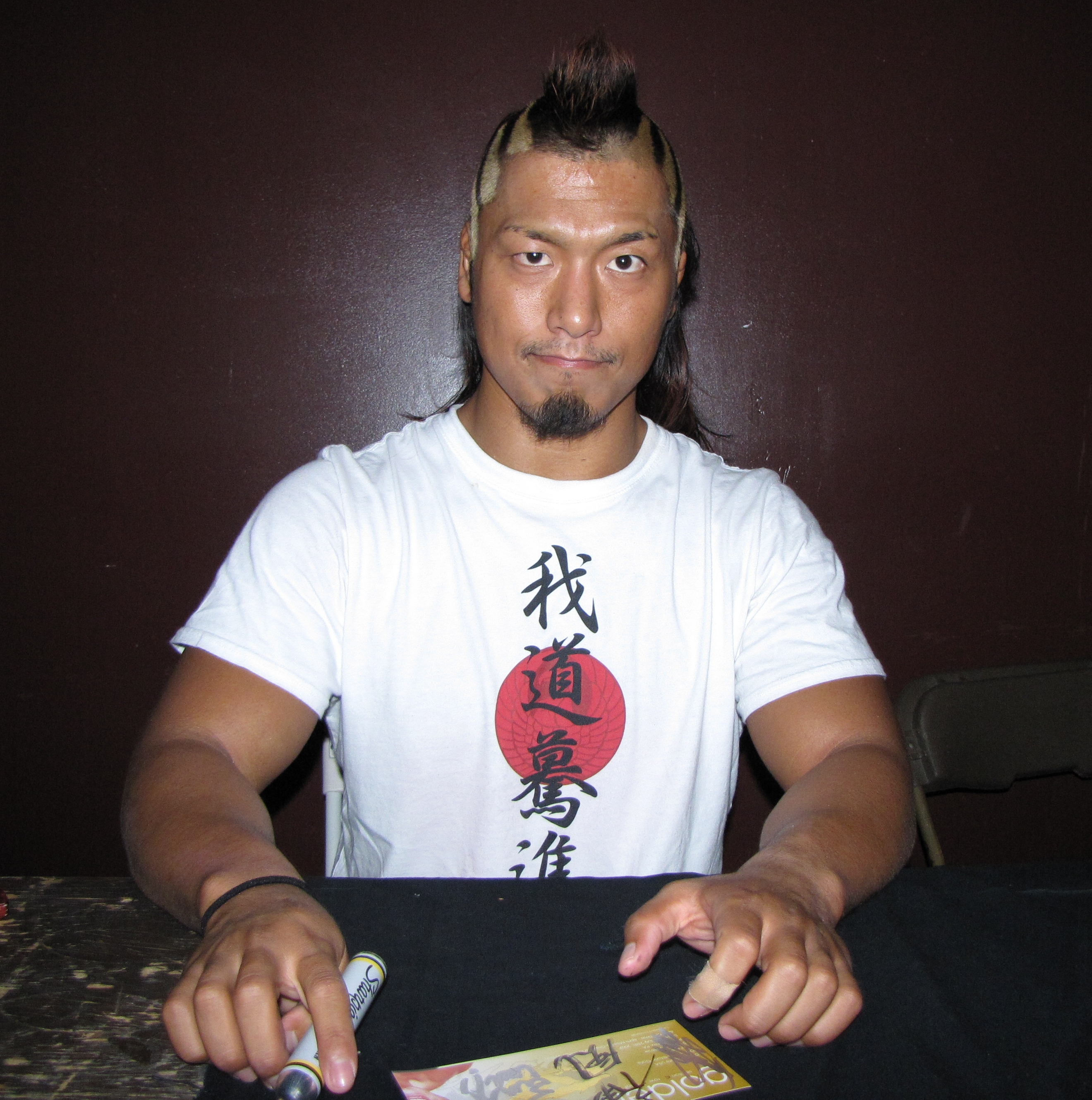
Takagi signing autographs in 2009

On May 14, 2008, Takagi and Kong turned on Hulk shortly before a scheduled Open the Triangle Gate Championship defense against Genki Horiguchi, Gamma and Yamato of the Muscle Outlaw'z, citing Hulk as a weakling. Takagi and Kong then joined up with Genki, Gamma, Yamato and Yasushi Kanda, ending both New Hazard and Muscle Outlaw'z and forming Real Hazard, a new faction. Takagi then teamed with Gamma and Yamato to win the newly-vacant Open the Triangle Gate Championship, defeating Naruki Doi, Masato Yoshino and Hulk. On June 28, they lost the Open the Triangle Gate Championship to Kenichiro Arai, Taku Iwasa and Shinobu of the Tozawa-juku faction.

The following day, he fought BxB Hulk to a one-hour draw in a number one contender's match for Cima's Open the Dream Gate Championship. They were immediately scheduled for a rematch on July 27, but this time the Open the Dream Gate Championship was on the line as Cima had to vacate the championship due to a neck injury. On July 10, doubt was already cast over his standing in Real Hazard when he stopped them and Tokyo Gurentai members from trying to give Cima an unwanted haircut. This caused tensions to stir between him and the others, especially with Kong. On July 27, Takagi defeated BxB Hulk to win the Open the Dream Gate Championship. After the match, Takagi apologized to Hulk and retracted his statement about him being weak. Soon after, Kong attempted to attack Cima, who was at the announce table, but Takagi stopped him. After a brief argument, Real Hazard attacked Takagi and kicked him out of the group for showing compassion towards Hulk and Cima, but he was saved by Typhoon.

Typhoon offered him membership in the faction, but he turned it down. He later teamed with Dragon Kid, a Typhoon member, in the Summer Adventure Tag League Tournament, and the pair reached the final before they were beaten by Naruki Doi and Masato Yoshino. Following this, Takagi changed his mind and joined Typhoon. Takagi's membership caused tension within the faction, and led to Susumu Yokosuka challenging Takagi to a match on November 16 for the Open the Dream Gate Championship. Takagi retained, and then tried to banish Yokosuka from Typhoon as punishment. Ryo Saito tried to stop him, and then Cima was called out. Takagi gave him a lariat before he could say anything, resulting in his banishment from Typhoon. After that, Takagi announced that he would not be participating in the annual King of Gate Tournament.

Takagi began teaming with Akira Tozawa and Taku Iwasa after the faction they had been members of, Tozawa-juku, had disbanded, with the trio officially forming a new faction on December 19. On December 28, Takagi lost the Open the Dream Gate Championship to Naruki Doi, who had won the King of the Gate Tournament. On January 11, 2009, Dragon Kid joined the new faction, with Takagi called the faction Kamikaze. On February 15, Takagi, Iwasa and Dragon Kid won the Open the Triangle Gate Championship, but lost the championship to Cima, Gamma and Kagetora on April 15. When Yamato left Real Hazard, he joined Kamikaze, reforming his team with Takagi. The duo won the annual Summer Adventure Tag League Tournament in August, and then the Open the Twin Gate Championship the following month. They held the titles until December 27, when they lost them to Cima and Gamma.

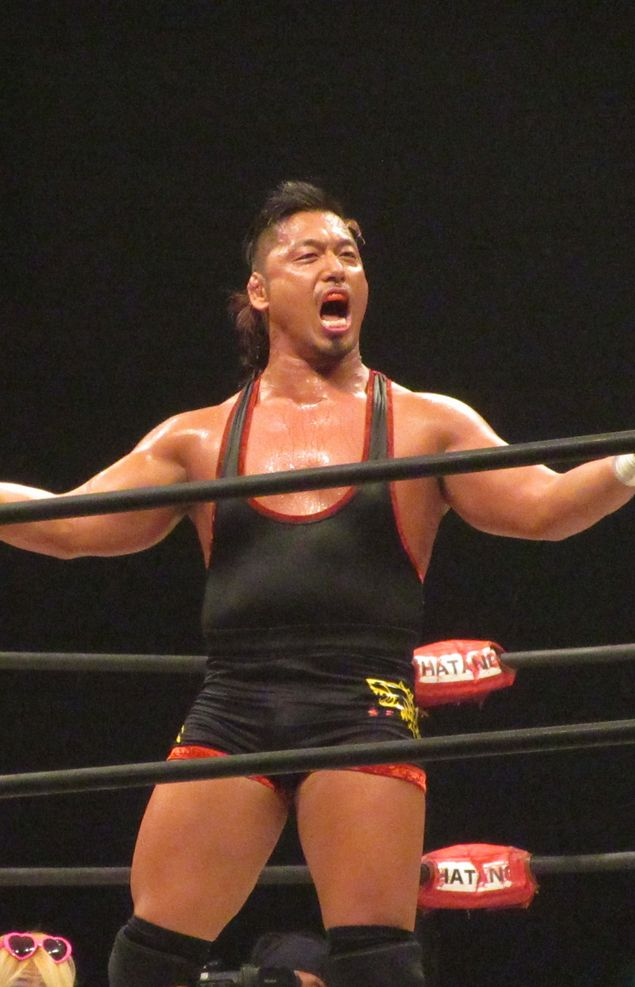
Takagi in November 2017

On March 22, 2010, Takagi and Cyber Kong defeated Cima and Gamma to regain the Open the Twin Gate Championship. Takagi participated in the 2010 King of Gate tournament and beat Dragon Kid in the final on April 14, 2010. This allowed him to contest Open the Dream Gate Championship match against his stablemate and champion Yamato at the Dead or Alive PPV on May 5, 2010, but Yamato retained the title by making Takagi submit. Takagi and Kong would lose their Twin Gate title to K-ness and Susumu Yokosuka on May 13, 2010. Takagi then renewed his old feud with former tag partner BxB Hulk, leading to a Hair vs Hair match at the Kobe World Pro Wrestling Festival 2010 on July 11. Takagi won the match and shaved off Hulk's hair.

After returning from an injury, Takagi disbanded Kamikaze on May 13, 2011 and the following day joined forces with Masaaki Mochizuki's new stable, Junction Three, to battle Cima's Blood Warriors. After Junction Three was disbanded in February 2012, Takagi, alongside Yamato, joined up with Dragon Gate Nex Member Chihiro Tominaga, and the debuting Super Shenlong III and formed -akatsuki- on April 19, 2012. On July 22, 2012, Takagi and Yamato defeated Jimmy Kagetora and Jimmy Susumu to become the 22nd Open the Twin Gate Champions. They lost the title to Don Fujii and Masaaki Mochizuki on September 23, 2012. Takagi and Yamato won the title for their third time together on May 5, 2013, by defeating BxB Hulk and Uhaa Nation. They lost the title to Akira Tozawa and BxB Hulk on June 15, when Yamato turned on Takagi. On July 21, Takagi defeated Cima to win the Open the Dream Gate Championship for the second time. On August 1, -akatsuki- was forced to disband, after losing to Mad Blankey in a five-on-four tag team match. On August 23, Takagi lost the Open the Dream Gate Championship to Yamato in his first defense. In order to continue his battle with Mad Blankey, Takagi formed a new stable named Monster Express with Akira Tozawa, Masato Yoshino, Ricochet, Shachihoko Boy and Uhaa Nation. On December 22, Takagi and Tozawa defeated Naruki Doi and Yamato to win the Open the Twin Gate Championship. They lost the title to Eita and T-Hawk on July 20, 2014. On August 31, Shingo, Tozawa and Uhaa Nation unsuccessfully challenged for the Open the Triangle Gate Championship against Cyber Kong, Naruki Doi and Kzy with Shingo getting pinned after Kong hit him with the Cyber Bomb. Shingo and Tozawa lost in the Summer Adventure Tag League semi-finals against T-Hawk and Eita. On December 28, Shingo unsuccessfully challenged for the Open the Dream Gate title against BxB Hulk. On August 16, 2015, Takagi defeated Masato Yoshino to win the Open the Dream Gate Championship for the third time. Shortly afterwards, Takagi was kicked out of Monster Express after turning on his then-stablemates Yoshino and Shachihoko BOY. Takagi would then form a new heel unit with the remnants of Mad Blankey, becoming the co-leader of the unit alongside Naruki Doi. On September 23, 2015, the new unit was named VerserK. On February 14, Takagi lost the Open the Dream Gate Championship to Jimmy Susumu in his fourth defense. He would regain the title from Susumu on March 6, becoming the first four-time champion. On July 24, 2016, Takagi lost the championship to Yamato. On January 18, 2017, Takagi, along with fellow VerserK teammates T-Hawk and El Lindaman won a special One Day 6 Man Tag Tournament, defeating Kotoka, Masato Yoshino and Ben-K.

=== Ring of Honor (2006–2008, 2023) ===
Shortly after becoming a member of Blood Generation, Shingo began wrestling for Ring of Honor (ROH) in the United States. He made several ROH appearances before becoming a regular wrestler in ROH in late 2006. He became one half of the ROH World Tag Team Champions alongside Naruki Doi on March 3, 2007, by beating the Briscoe Brothers in Liverpool, England. The two lost the championship back to the Briscoes at All Star Extravaganza III on March 30.

Shingo had his final official ROH match at "Good Times, Great Memories" on April 28, 2007, unsuccessfully challenging Takeshi Morishima for the ROH World Championship. He challenged the Briscoe Brothers for ROH World Tag Team Championship unsuccessfully at ROH's Live in Osaka show with his partner Susumu Yokosuka on July 17. At Wrestlemania weekend in 2008 at "Dragon Gate Challenge II" and "Supercard of Honor III", he and BxB Hulk wrestled The Age of the Fall (Tyler Black and Jimmy Jacobs), and El Generico and Kevin Steen respectively in his last two ROH appearances.

In June, Takagi returned to Ring of Honor, which was now the sister company of AEW, teaming with his Los Ingobernables de Japon teammates Hiromu Takahashi and Bushi, to unsuccessfully challenge The Mogul Embassy (Brian Cage, Bishop Kaun and Toa Liona) for the ROH World Six-Man Tag Team Championships.

=== Other promotions (2006–2009) ===
Throughout 2006 and 2007 Shingo appeared in several American promotions, including Full Impact Pro and Pro Wrestling Guerrilla. On February 27, 2007, Shingo won the Southern Thunder Pro Wrestling Texas Heavyweight Championship by defeating Texas Renegade. On September 5, 2007 he made his Hawaii debut for Action Zone Wrestling (AZW) teaming with Sabaki in a losing effort to AZW Tag Team Champions Devilshock. On March 8, 2009, he won his first wrestling tournament in Germany by emerging triumphant at wXw's annual wXw 16 Carat Gold Tournament. In 2009, he began wrestling for Dragon Gate USA.

=== New Japan Pro-Wrestling ===
==== Joining Los Ingobernables de Japón and Junior Heavyweight division (2018–2019) ====
Takagi made his surprise debut for New Japan Pro-Wrestling (NJPW) during the King of Pro-Wrestling event on October 8, 2018, joining the Los Ingobernables de Japón (LIJ) faction. At Wrestle Kingdom 13 on January 4, 2019, Takagi teamed with Bushi to win the IWGP Junior Heavyweight Tag Team Championship from Suzuki-gun (Yoshinobu Kanemaru and El Desperado). However, Takagi and Bushi later lost the tag team championship to Roppongi 3K (Sho and Yoh) at NJPW's 47th Anniversary Show on March 6. At the G1 Supercard on April 6, Takagi competed in the Honor Rumble, but the match was won by Kenny King.

From May to June, Takagi participated in the 2019 Best of Super Juniors tournament in the A Block. He defeated all of his opponents in the A Block, becoming the first person to go undefeated in the tournament, and he also set a new record for most points scored in the tournament, with 18. This allowed him to advance to the tournament final against B Block winner Will Ospreay, where he was defeated, in what was Takagi's first pinfall loss in NJPW.

==== NEVER Openweight Champion (2020–2021) ====
After defeating Satoshi Kojima at Dominion 6.9 in Osaka-jo Hall, Takagi stated his intention to move into NJPW's heavyweight division and also declared himself as an entrant for the 2019 G1 Climax. In the G1 Climax, Takagi competed in the B Block and ended with a final score of 8 points (four wins and five losses), failing to move onto the tournament final. At Destruction in Kobe on September 22, Takagi was defeated by Hirooki Goto. On January 5, 2020 at Wrestle Kingdom 14, Takagi and LIJ teammates Bushi and Evil defeated four other teams in a gauntlet match to win the NEVER Openweight 6-Man Tag Team Championship. On February 1 at The New Beginning in Sapporo, Takagi defeated Goto to win the NEVER Openweight Championship, making him a double champion and the first person to hold both NEVER championships at the same time. On February 24, Takagi was announced for the 2020 New Japan Cup. However, due to the COVID-19 pandemic, the event was postponed and NJPW was temporarily shut down.

NJPW returned to holding events in June, and Takagi was eliminated in the first round of the New Japan Cup by Sho. At Dominion in Osaka-jo Hall on July 17, Takagi defeated Sho to retain his NEVER Openweight Championship. On August 1, NJPW declared the NEVER Openweight 6-Man Tag Team Championship vacant, after Evil defected from LIJ. Takagi defeated El Desperado at Sengoku Lord. At Summer Struggle in Jingu on August 29, Takagi lost the NEVER Openweight Championship to Minoru Suzuki. Takagi then competed in the 2020 G1 Climax, in the A Block. He ended the tournament with a final tally of 8 points (four wins and five losses) losing to Jay White, Jeff Cobb, Tomohiro Ishii, Kazuchika Okada, and Taichi, failing to advance to the tournament final. However Takagi would get wins over Yujiro Takahashi, British Heavyweight Champion Will Ospreay, current rival Minoru Suzuki, and over eventual tournament winner Kota Ibushi.

On November 7 at Power Struggle, Takagi regained the NEVER Openweight Championship by defeating Suzuki for a second time. At Wrestle Kingdom 15 on January 4, 2021, Takagi successfully defended his title against Jeff Cobb. On January 30 at The New Beginning in Nagoya, Takagi lost the NEVER Openweight Championship to Hiroshi Tanahashi.

==== IWGP World Heavyweight Champion (2021–2022) ====
A highlight reel demonstrating the professional wrestling style of Shingo Takagi during a match with Low Ki in 2022

In March 2021, Takagi would enter the New Japan Cup where after defeating Kazuchika Okada in the first round, Hirooki Goto in the second round, KENTA in the quarter-finals, and EVIL in the semi-finals, he would lose to Will Ospreay in the final. After Ospreay defeated Kota Ibushi for the IWGP World Heavyweight Championship, Takagi would challenge him for a match at Wrestling Dontaku 2021. At the event, Takagi failed to defeat Ospreay. At Dominion 6.7, Shingo defeated Kazuchika Okada for the vacant championship. Takagi would make his first title defense on July 25 at Wrestle Grand Slam in Tokyo Dome after defeating Hiroshi Tanahashi. Takagi was originally scheduled to defend the title against Ibushi, however the latter suffered an injury and was unable to compete. Takagi made his second successful defense on September 5 by defeating EVIL at Wrestle Grand Slam in Belluna Dome. Takagi's third title defence came on November 6 against Zack Sabre Jr. at Power Struggle, in which Takagi was successful. On Night 1 of Wrestle Kingdom 16, Takagi lost the title to Kazuchika Okada, ending his reign at a record 211 days.

Takagi teamed with his LIJ teammates for the remainder of Wrestle Kingdom, defeating Suzuki-Gun on Night 2 and Pro Wrestling NOAH's Kongo stable on Night 3. Takagi attempted to rebound off of his Wrestle Kingdom Night one loss by entering the New Japan Cup. He defeated Tomohiro Ishii, Tanga Loa, Chase Owens and Hiromu Takahashi to make it to the semi-finals. In the semi-finals round, Takagi lost to eventual cup winner, Zack Sabre Jr.

==== Further championship success (2022–2025) ====
Takagi then entered a feud with provisional KOPW provisional champion Taichi. This led to a 30-count match, in which Takagi was victorious, becoming the new provisional KOPW Champion. The two faced off again at Dominion 6.12 in Osaka-jo Hall in a 10-minute scramble match, in which Takagi again emerged victorious. Also at Dominion, Takagi was announced as a competitor in the upcoming G1 Climax 32 tournament, where he would compete in the D block. However, before the tournament began Takagi competed at AEW x NJPW: Forbidden Door, a supershow between New Japan Pro-Wrestling and American promotion All Elite Wrestling (AEW), where he teamed with Sting and Darby Allin as 'Dudes with Attitude' to defeat Bullet Club's, El Phantasmo and The Young Bucks, with Takagi pinning Phantasmo for the win. Back in Japan in the G1 Climax tournament, Takagi finished with 6 points, failing to advance to the semi-finals.

Following the G1, Takagi defeated Phantasmo, retaining the provisional KOPW at Declaration of Power, in a "Who's your Daddy match", thus forcing Phantasmo to call Shingo his "Daddy", whilst dressing up as a baby. The final match between the two men took place on October 28, where Takagi once again defeated Phantasmo to retain the provisional KOPW Championship, in a New York City Street Fight. In December at JTO 50th Anniversary For TAKATaichi Together, Takagi retained the KOPW provisional championship against Taichi in a Last Man Standing Match, thus making Takagi the official 2022 KOPW Champion. On January 4, 2023, at Wrestle Kingdom 17, Takagi competed in the New Japan Rambo, successfully lasting till the final 4 and thus advancing to the four-way match, the following night. The following night at New Year Dash, Takagi defeated Sho, Toru Yano and Great-O-Khan to win the 2023 KOPW provisional championship.

Later that month, on January 21 at Wrestle Kingdom 17 in Yokohama Arena, Takagi competed in a series of matches, where members of LIJ competed against members of Kongo, from Pro Wrestling Noah. At the event, Takagi defeated Kongo's Katsuhiko Nakajima. The following day at The New Beginning in Nagoya, Takagi retained the provisional KOPW championship, defeated Great-O-Khan in an MMA rules match. After the victory, Takagi called out the IWGP World Heavyweight Champion, Kazuchika Okada, stating he wanted to become a double champion in NJPW. Takagi received his title match on February 11 at The New Beginning in Osaka, but was defeated by Okada. The following month, Takagi competed in the New Japan Cup, but was quickly eliminated in the first round, by Aaron Henare. The loss earnt Henare a future KOPW championship shot, which he received on April 2. The title match was contested under "Ultimate Triad" rules, meaning that to win, a wrestler would have to pin, submit and knock their opponent down for a ten-count. Takagi would defeat Henare at the event. Later that month, Takagi made his debut on NJPW Tamashii, NJPW's Australasian subsidiary. On April 30, Takagi lost the provisional KOPW championship to Taichi, ending his reign at 114 days.

On June 25, Takagi teamed with Bushi and Hiromu Takahashi to defeat United Empire (T. J. Perkins, Kyle Fletcher and Jeff Cobb) on the buy-in of Forbidden Door. The following month, Takagi entered the G1 Climax tournament competing in the C Block. Takagi finished his tournament with 7 points, failing to advance from his block. On October 28 at Fighting Spirit Unleashed, Takagi defeated Tonga to win the NEVER Openweight Championship for the third time. Takagi defended his title the following month, defeating Trent Beretta at Lonestar Shootout. On January 4, 2024 at Wrestle Kingdom 18, Takagi lost the NEVER Openweight Championship back to Tama Tonga, ending his third reign at 68 days.

The day following Wrestle Kingdom, at New Year Dash!!, Takagi challenged Jon Moxley to a No Disqualification match, the following week at Battle in the Valley. On January 13 at the event, Takagi was defeated by Moxley. In March Takagi entered the annual New Japan Cup, defeating Yuya Uemura and Gabe Kidd to make it to the quarterfinal round. On March 17, Takagi was defeated by Evil, eliminating him from the tournament. Despite this, Takagi began chasing Evil, in an attempt to both redeem his loss and reclaim the NEVER Openweight Championship, which Evil had won. Takagi received his title match on April 6, at Sakura Genesis. At the event, Takagi defeated Evil, winning his fourth NEVER Openweight Championship.

Takagi made his first title defence on May 4, at Wrestling Dontaku, defeating Gabe Kidd. The following week at Resurgence, Takagi retained the title against Yuya Uemura. On June 9 at Dominion 6.9 in Osaka-jo Hall, Takagi defended his title against Henare, when the match ended in a Double KO. A week later at New Japan Soul, Takagi lost the title to Henare, ending his fourth reign at 71 days. In July, Takagi participated in the G1 Climax, where he was placed in A-Block and scoring 10 points. Takagi advanced to the playoff stage, where he defeated Great-O-Khan in the quarter-finals, but lost to eventual winner Zack Sabre Jr. in the semi-finals. On September 29 at Destruction in Kobe, Takagi defeated Henare to win his fifth NEVER Openweight Championship.

On January 4, 2025 at Wrestle Kingdom 19, Takagi lost his title to Konosuke Takeshita in a Winner takes all match, also involving Takeshita's AEW International Championship, ending his fifth reign at 97 days. In March 2025, Takagi entered the New Japan Cup, defeating Boltin Oleg and Drilla Moloney to reach the semi-finals, before losing to Shota Umino.

==== The Rampage Dragon (2025–present) ====
At Wrestling Dontaku: Night 2 on May 4 where Takagi teamed with L.I.J stablemates Bushi, Hiromu Takahashi, Tetsuya Naito to defeat Shota Umino, Tomohiro Ishii and Just 4 Guys' Taichi and Taka Michinoku in what would be Bushi and Naito's farewell match in NJPW. At the same event, it was announced that L.I.J would be ending as a stable moving forward. After the L.I.J's disbandment, Takagi adopted the moniker of the "Rampage Dragon" and would go to unsuccessfully challenge Hirooki Goto at Dominion 6.15 in Osaka-jo Hall for the IWGP World Heavyweight Championship. Takagi and the remaining L.I.J. members would also form a new stable called "Unaffilated." On October 13 at King of Pro-Wrestling, the Unaffilated formed an alliance with the Bullet Club War Dogs. For the 2025 World Tag League, Takagi teamed with War Dogs member Drilla Moloney and the duo would go by the name of "War Dragons". The War Dragons finished with eight points in the block stage and failed to advance with to the semi-finals.

After Wrestle Kingdom 20, at New Year Dash!!, David Finlay and Yota Tsuji announced the dissolution of Bullet Club and Unaffilated, replacing the alliance with Unbound Co., which was a complete merger. On Night 2 of Wrestling Dontaku on May 4, 2026, Takagi unsuccessfully challenged Callum Newman for the IWGP Heavyweight Championship. After the G1 Climax, Takagi began a feud with the All Elite Wrestling stable, the Death Riders, first defeating Wheeler Yuta in a tag match and Claudio Castagnoli on September 27 at Destruction in Kobe before calling out stable leader Jon Moxley. On November 3 at Power Struggle, Takagi teamed with stabelmate Jeff Cobb to defeat Moxley and Yuta before challenging the former to a match at Wrestle Kingdom 21 which was accepted.

== Personal life ==
Outside of his pro-wrestling career, Takagi supports his local football club, Ventforet Kofu, which currently compete in J2 League. He expressed support to LDP politician Sanae Takaichi following her appointment as Prime Minister of Japan in October 2025.

Takagi began dating Natsumi Maki, also known as Natsupoi, after Takagi was invited to a Stardom show to promote his anniversary tour in May 2024. The two married at the end of 2025.

== Championships and accomplishments ==
- Dragon Gate
  - Open the Dream Gate Championship (4 times)
  - Open the Owarai Gate Championship (1 time)
  - Open the Triangle Gate Championship (6 times) – with BxB Hulk and Cyber Kong (2), Gamma and Yamato (1), and Taku Iwasa and Dragon Kid (1), Cyber Kong and T-Hawk (1), Takashi Yoshida and El Lindaman (1)
  - Open the Twin Gate Championship (5 times) – with Yamato (3), Cyber Kong (1) and Akira Tozawa (1)
  - King of Gate (2010)
  - New Year's Unit 6-Man Tag 1 Day Tournament (2017) – with El Lindaman and T-Hawk
  - Summer Adventure Tag League (2009) – with Yamato
- New Japan Pro-Wrestling
  - IWGP Heavyweight Championship (1 time) (Note: During Takagi's reign, the title was called the IWGP World Heavyweight Championship.)
  - IWGP Intercontinental Championship (1 time) (Note: With the reactivation of the IWGP Heavyweight Championship and the restored and combined histories of both it, the World Heavyweight, and the Intercontinental titles, all former IWGP World Heavyweight Champions are retroactively recognized as having been an IWGP Intercontinental Champion.)
  - IWGP Junior Heavyweight Tag Team Championship (1 time) – with Bushi
  - NEVER Openweight Championship (5 times)
  - NEVER Openweight 6-Man Tag Team Championship (1 time) – with Bushi and Evil
  - KOPW Championship (1 time)
  - Seventh NJPW Triple Crown Champion
- Pro Wrestling Illustrated
  - Ranked No. 9 of the top 500 singles wrestlers in the PWI 500 in 2021
- Pro Wrestling Noah
  - GHC Junior Heavyweight Tag Team Championship (1 time) – with BxB Hulk
- Ring of Honor
  - ROH World Tag Team Championship (1 time) – with Naruki Doi
- Sports Illustrated
  - Ranked No. 4 of the top 10 wrestlers in 2021
- Tokyo Sports
  - MVP Award (2021)
  - Technique Award (2008)
- Westside Xtreme Wrestling
  - 16 Carat Gold Tournament (2009)
- Wrestling Observer Newsletter
  - Rookie of the Year (2005)
  - Match of the Year (2019) vs. Will Ospreay at the Best of the Super Juniors Finals
  - Most Outstanding Wrestler (2021)
  - Japan MVP (2021)
  - Wrestling Observer Newsletter Hall of Fame (2024)

=== Luchas de Apuestas record ===
Winner (wager)	Loser (wager)	Location	Event	Date	Notes
Shingo Takagi (hair)	BxB Hulk (hair)	Kobe, Japan	Kobe Pro-Wrestling Festival 2010	July 11, 2010	
