= Wrestling Dontaku 2021 =

2021 New Japan Pro-Wrestling event

- Promotion: New Japan Pro-Wrestling
- Date: May 3–4, 2021
- City: Fukuoka, Japan
- Venue: Fukuoka Kokusai Center
- Attendance: Night 1: 2,211; Night 2: 2,367

Event chronology
← Previous; Sakura Genesis; Road to Wrestling Dontaku 2021	Next → Road to Dominion

Wrestling Dontaku chronology
← Previous; 2019	Next → 2022

Wrestling Dontaku 2021 was a professional wrestling event promoted by New Japan Pro-Wrestling (NJPW). The event took place on May 3 and 4, 2021, in Fukuoka, at the Fukuoka Kokusai Center.

The event featured eleven matches, throughout both nights. In the main event of the first night Jay White defeated Hiroshi Tanahashi to win the NEVER Openweight Championship. In the second night's main event, Will Ospreay defeated Shingo Takagi to retain the IWGP World Heavyweight Championship. This was the seventeenth event under the Wrestling Dontaku name.

== Production ==
Other on-screen personnel
Role:	Name:
English Commentators	Kevin Kelly
English Commentators	Chris Charlton
English Commentators	Rocky Romero
Japanese Commentators	Shinpei Nogami
Japanese Commentators	Milano Collection A.T.
Japanese Commentators	Katsuhiko Kanazawa
Japanese Commentators	Kazuyoshi Sakai
Japanese Commentators	Togi Makabe
Japanese Commentators	Miki Motoi
Japanese Commentators	Jushin Thunder Liger
Japanese Commentators	Masahiro Chono
Ring announcers	Makoto Abe
Ring announcers	Kimihiko Ozaki
Referees	Kenta Sato
Referees	Marty Asami
Referees	Red Shoes Unno

=== Background ===
Since 2020, NJPW has unable to run events with a full arena capacity due to COVID-19 restrictions.

=== Storylines ===
Each night of Wrestling Dontaku 2021 will feature six professional wrestling matches that involved different wrestlers from pre-existing scripted feuds and storylines. Wrestlers portrayed villains, heroes, or less distinguishable characters in the scripted events that built tension and culminated in a wrestling match or series of matches.

== Results ==
=== Night 1 ===
No.	Results	Stipulations	Times
1	Bullet Club (Evil, Yujiro Takahashi, Taiji Ishimori and Dick Togo) defeated Toru Yano, Hiroyoshi Tenzan, Tiger Mask IV and Master Wato	Eight-man tag team match	9:57
2	Chaos (Kazuchika Okada, Sho and Yoh) defeated Suzuki-gun (El Desperado, Minoru Suzuki and Yoshinobu Kanemaru)	Six-man tag team match	10:31
3	Los Ingobernables de Japón (Bushi, Sanada, Shingo Takagi and Tetsuya Naito) defeated United Empire (Will Ospreay, Great-O-Khan, Jeff Cobb and Aaron Henare)	Eight-man tag team match	11:31
4	Zack Sabre Jr. defeated Tanga Loa	Singles match Since Zack Sabre Jr. won, Dangerous Tekkers received a future IWGP Tag Team Championship match.	15:12
5	Taichi defeated Tama Tonga	Ladder match for the Iron Finger from Hell	27:11
6	Jay White defeated Hiroshi Tanahashi (c)	Singles match for the NEVER Openweight Championship	39:01
(c) / – the champion(s) heading into the match

=== Night 2 ===
No.	Results	Stipulations	Times
1	Suzuki-gun (Taichi, Zack Sabre Jr. and Douki) defeated Bullet Club (Tama Tonga, Tanga Loa and Jado) by submission	Six-man tag team match	10:00
2	Bullet Club (Yujiro Takahashi and Taiji Ishimori) defeated Hiroyoshi Tenzan and Master Wato	Tag team match	10:42
3	United Empire (Great-O-Khan, Jeff Cobb and Aaron Henare) defeated Los Ingobernables de Japón (Bushi, Sanada and Tetsuya Naito)	Six-man tag team match	14:54
4	Hiroshi Tanahashi, Toru Yano and Ryusuke Taguchi defeated Bullet Club (Jay White, Evil and Dick Togo)	Six-man tag team match	12:14
5	Will Ospreay (c) defeated Shingo Takagi	Singles match for the IWGP World Heavyweight Championship	44:53
(c) / – the champion(s) heading into the match
