= Battle in the Valley =

- Promotions: New Japan Pro-Wrestling
- First event: Battle in the Valley (2021)

Battle in the Valley is a professional wrestling event held annually by New Japan Pro-Wrestling (NJPW). The event was first held in 2021, at San Jose Civic in San Jose, California and has been held there ever since.

== History ==
In October 2019, NJPW announced their expansion into the United States with their new American division, New Japan Pro-Wrestling of America. On August 14, 2021 at Resurgence, NJPW announced Battle in the Valley for November 13 at San Jose Civic in San Jose, California. On October 28, 2022 at Rumble on 44th Street, NJPW announced Battle in the Valley for February 18, 2023 at San Jose Civic in San Jose, California, thus establishing Battle in the Valley as an annual event.

== Dates and venues ==
#	Event	Date	City	Venue	Main Event	Notes	Ref
1	Battle in the Valley (2021)	November 13, 2021	San Jose, California	San Jose Civic	Tomohiro Ishii vs. Jay White (c) for the NEVER Openweight Championship		
2	Battle in the Valley (2023)	February 18, 2023	San Jose, California	San Jose Civic	Kazuchika Okada (c) vs Hiroshi Tanahashi for the IWGP World Heavyweight Championship		
3	Battle in the Valley (2024)	January 13, 2024	San Jose, California	San Jose Civic	Kazuchika Okada vs. Will Ospreay		
4	Battle in the Valley (2025)	January 11, 2025	San Jose, California	San Jose Civic	El Desperado (c) vs. Taiji Ishimori for the IWGP Junior Heavyweight Championship		
