= Wrestle Kingdom 11 =

2017 New Japan Pro-Wrestling event

- Promotional poster for the event, featuring various NJPW wrestlers
- Promotion: New Japan Pro-Wrestling
- Date: January 4, 2017
- City: Tokyo, Japan
- Venue: Tokyo Dome
- Attendance: 26,192
- Tagline: New Year fight arrives! 1.4! (Japanese: 新春闘来! イッテンヨン!, Hepburn: Shinshun Tōrai! Ittenyon!)

Event chronology
← Previous; Dai Puroresu Matsuri	Next → New Year Dash!!

Wrestle Kingdom chronology
← Previous; 10	Next → 12

New Japan Pro-Wrestling events chronology
← Previous; Global Wars UK 2016 Night 2	Next → New Year Dash!!

Wrestle Kingdom 11 in Tokyo Dome was a professional wrestling event promoted by New Japan Pro-Wrestling (NJPW). The event took place on January 4, 2017, at the Tokyo Dome in Tokyo, Japan. It was the 26th January 4 Tokyo Dome Show.

The show was main evented by Kazuchika Okada successfully defending the IWGP Heavyweight Championship against the 2016 G1 Climax winner Kenny Omega. The match went into history as the then-longest ever held as part of the January 4 Tokyo Dome Show (later surpassed by the main event of night Two of Wrestle Kingdom 15). Other featured matches saw Tetsuya Naito successfully defend the IWGP Intercontinental Championship against Hiroshi Tanahashi, Hirooki Goto defeat Katsuyori Shibata to become the new NEVER Openweight Champion and Hiromu Takahashi defeat Kushida to become the new IWGP Junior Heavyweight Champion. As part of a partnership between NJPW and the American Ring of Honor (ROH) promotion, the ROH World Championship was also defended at the event with Adam Cole defeating Kyle O'Reilly to become the new champion. All in all, the event featured eleven matches (one on the pre-show), eight of which were contested for championships, leading to six title changes.

The main event was widely praised by both journalists and other wrestlers. Dave Meltzer of the Wrestling Observer Newsletter, who normally rates matches on a scale of zero to five stars, gave the match a six-star rating, stating that "Kenny Omega and Kazuchika Okada may have put on the greatest match in pro wrestling history". Both Pro Wrestling Illustrated and Tokyo Sports named the main event Match of the Year.

== Production ==
Other on-screen personnel
Role:	Name:
Commentators	Kevin Kelly (English-language announcer)
Commentators	Steve Corino (English-language announcer)
Ring announcers	Makoto Abe
Referees	Kenta Sato
Referees	Marty Asami
Referees	Red Shoes Unno
Referees	Tiger Hattori

=== Background ===
The January 4 Tokyo Dome Show is NJPW's biggest annual event and has been called "the largest wrestling show in the world outside of the United States" and the "Japanese equivalent to the Super Bowl".

Wrestle Kingdom 11 aired worldwide through NJPW's internet streaming site, NJPW World, with both Japanese and English language commentaries. The English commentary was provided by Kevin Kelly and Steve Corino. The event would also air in four parts on the American AXS TV network, starting January 13, 2017, with commentary provided by Jim Ross and Josh Barnett. A shortened version of the event would also air on tape delay after midnight on January 5 on the Japanese TV Asahi network with special guests Ken Yasuda, Masahiro Chono, Suzuko Mimori and Yasutaro Matsuki.

=== Storylines ===
Wrestle Kingdom 11 featured eleven professional wrestling matches that involved different wrestlers from pre-existing scripted feuds and storylines. Wrestlers portrayed villains, heroes, or less distinguishable characters in the scripted events that built tension and culminated in a wrestling match or series of matches.

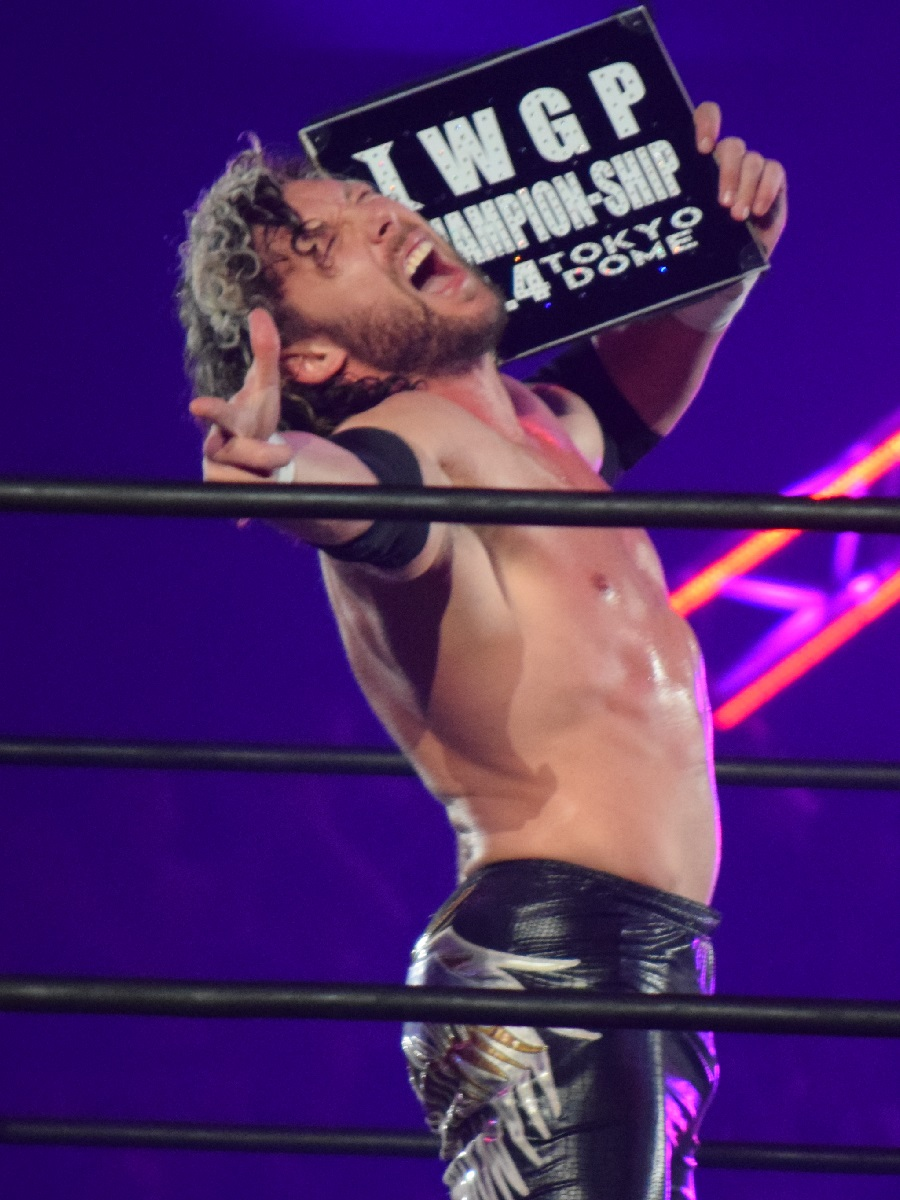
Kenny Omega holding the briefcase containing a contract for a shot at the IWGP Heavyweight Championship at Wrestle Kingdom 11

Wrestle Kingdom 11 was main evented by Kazuchika Okada defending the IWGP Heavyweight Championship against Kenny Omega. Okada won the title on June 19, 2016, by defeating Tetsuya Naito at Dominion 6.19 in Osaka-jo Hall. Meanwhile, Omega became the number one contender at the Tokyo Dome by winning the 2016 G1 Climax the following August, defeating Hirooki Goto in the final to become the first foreign winner of NJPW's premier tournament. Afterwards, Okada retained the IWGP Heavyweight Championship against Pro Wrestling Noah representative Naomichi Marufuji, avenging a loss suffered during the 2016 G1 Climax, while Omega defended his status as the number one contender against Yoshi-Hashi and Hirooki Goto, leading to the match between Okada and Omega being made official for the Tokyo Dome in a press conference on October 11. Omega stated that his goal as champion was to take the IWGP Heavyweight Championship abroad and defend it in countries like the United States, United Kingdom and New Zealand in direct opposition to WWE and their global strategy. Okada and Omega were the heads of the Chaos and Bullet Club stables, respectively, and the match at Wrestle Kingdom 11 marked the first singles match between the two. The match also marked Omega's first ever shot at the IWGP Heavyweight Championship.

Wrestle Kingdom 11 would also feature Tetsuya Naito defending the IWGP Intercontinental Championship, against Hiroshi Tanahashi. In January 2016, Shinsuke Nakamura was stripped of the IWGP Intercontinental Championship after he announced that he was leaving NJPW for WWE, which led to Hiroshi Tanahashi and Kenny Omega being put up in a match to determine the new champion. Omega went on to win the match on February 14 at The New Beginning in Niigata, which led to a rematch being booked in ladder match on June 19 at Dominion 6.19 in Osaka-jo Hall. However, before the match, Tanahashi suffered a legitimate shoulder injury and was forced to pull out, being replaced by Michael Elgin, who went on to defeat Omega to become the new IWGP Intercontinental Champion. Elgin then entered a storyline rivalry with Tetsuya Naito, during which Naito was backed by his Los Ingobernables de Japón (L.I.J.) stable, while Elgin had the backing of Hiroshi Tanahashi, who had started his own rivalry with L.I.J. member Sanada, after losing to him during the 2016 G1 Climax. On September 25 at Destruction in Kobe, Naito defeated Elgin for the IWGP Intercontinental Championship in a match that featured outside interference from the entire L.I.J. as well as Tanahashi. A rematch was booked between the two for the November 5 Power Struggle event, but Elgin was forced to pull out of the match after suffering an eye injury. Naito instead went on to defeat Ring of Honor (ROH) wrestler Jay Lethal to retain the title. Following the match, Tanahashi, who had defeated Sanada earlier in the event, confronted Naito, challenging him to a title match at the Tokyo Dome, which Naito accepted. The match broke Tanahashi's seven-year streak of Tokyo Dome main events, although Tanahashi did bring up the possibility of NJPW setting up a fan vote to decide whether the Intercontinental or Heavyweight Championship match would main event the show. This harked back to the 2014 Wrestle Kingdom 8 event, where Naito and Kazuchika Okada's IWGP Heavyweight Championship match lost the main event spot to Tanahashi and Shinsuke Nakamura's IWGP Intercontinental Championship match, following a fan vote. Naito, however, claimed that he was against a fan vote, stating that he had always felt that the Heavyweight Championship should main event the Tokyo Dome and him being the Intercontinental Champion had not changed his mind. Naito had yet to win a singles match in the Tokyo Dome, having lost all five of his previous matches.

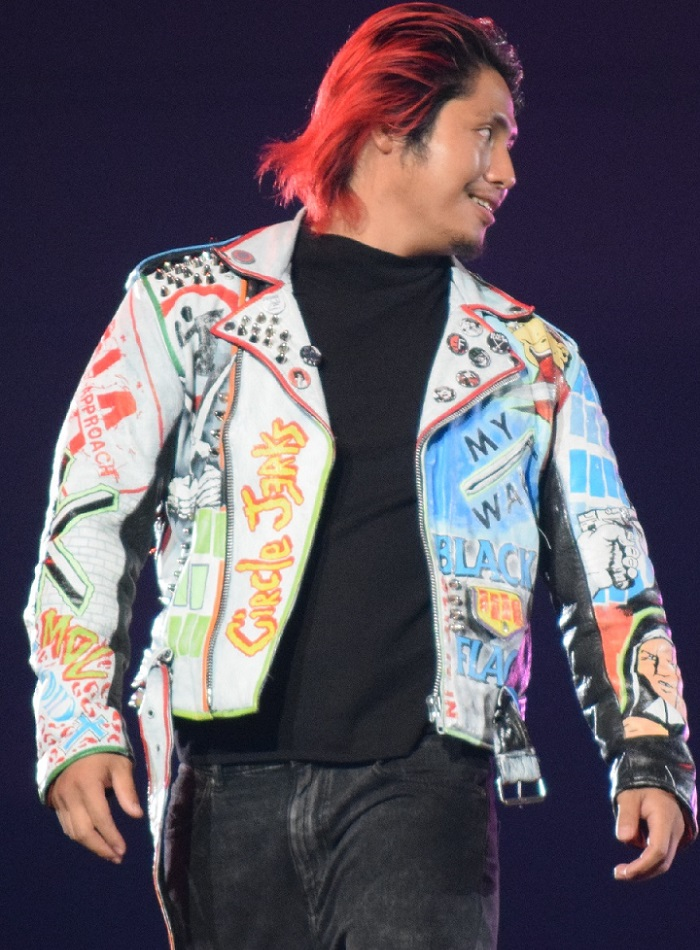
Hiromu Takahashi, who challenged for the IWGP Junior Heavyweight Championship at Wrestle Kingdom 11

Another title match would see Kushida defend the IWGP Junior Heavyweight Championship against Hiromu Takahashi. This match was set up at Power Struggle on November 5, when, after Kushida had defeated Bushi to regain the IWGP Junior Heavyweight Championship, he was confronted by the returning Takahashi, who challenged him to a title match. Takahashi was revealed as the surprise "time bomb", NJPW had promoted for the past months. Takahashi made his debut in August 2010 and wrestled on NJPW undercards until June 2013, when he was sent on an indefinite overseas learning excursion, originally to the United Kingdom and eventually to Mexico and the Consejo Mundial de Lucha Libre (CMLL) promotion, where he adopted a mask and the ring name "Kamaitachi". Takahashi, as Kamaitachi, returned to Japan on January 24, 2016, wrestling Dragon Lee for the CMLL World Super Lightweight Championship at the NJPW and CMLL co-produced Fantastica Mania 2016 event. Following the event, Takahashi returned to CMLL, where he remained until the following April, after which he began wrestling in the United States. During his Power Struggle return, Takahashi was once again promoted under his real name and not as Kamaitachi. On December 10, Takahashi attacked Kushida during a tag team match and afterwards joined Los Ingobernables de Japón. Six days later, Takahashi wrestled his official return match, where he and Tetsuya Naito defeated Kushida and Hiroshi Tanahashi with him pinning Kushida for the win.

The IWGP Junior Heavyweight Tag Team Championship would also be defended at Wrestle Kingdom 11 with The Young Bucks (Matt Jackson and Nick Jackson) defending against Roppongi Vice (Beretta and Rocky Romero). Roppongi Vice earned the shot at the title by winning the 2016 Super Jr. Tag Tournament on November 5 at Power Struggle. Despite entering the tournament in the midst of a storyline, where Beretta and Romero had begun showing signs of dissension, the two went on to defeat A. C. H. and Taiji Ishimori in the final to win the tournament and immediately afterwards challenged The Young Bucks to a title match at the Tokyo Dome, which was made official two days later.

The rest of the matches for Wrestle Kingdom 11 were announced on December 12, after the conclusion of the 2016 World Tag League. On December 10, G.B.H. (Togi Makabe and Tomoaki Honma) defeated reigning IWGP Tag Team Champions Guerrillas of Destiny (Tama Tonga and Tanga Loa) in the final to win their second consecutive World Tag League. This marked the first time in 22 years that NJPW's top tag team tournament had been won by the same team in two consecutive years. Hiroshi Hase and Keiji Mutoh had won the tournament in 1993 and 1994, when it was known as the Super Grade Tag League. After the win, G.B.H. challenged Guerrillas of Destiny to a rematch for the IWGP Tag Team Championship, which was made official two days later. Earlier in 2016, both teams had met in two matches for the IWGP Tag Team Championship, which were both won by Guerrillas of Destiny; first on April 10 at Invasion Attack 2016, where they won the IWGP Tag Team Championship and again on May 3 at Wrestling Dontaku 2016, where they successfully defended the title. On December 16, Toru Yano returned to NJPW from a stay in Pro Wrestling Noah, requesting to be added to the IWGP Tag Team Championship match with Tomohiro Ishii as his partner, despite the fact that Ishii had already been booked for another match at Wrestle Kingdom 11. The next day, Yano and Ishii attacked both G.B.H. and the Guerrillas of Destiny, stealing the latter's IWGP Tag Team Championship belts. On December 19, Yano and Ishii were officially added to the IWGP Tag Team Championship match at Wrestle Kingdom 11, making it a three-way.

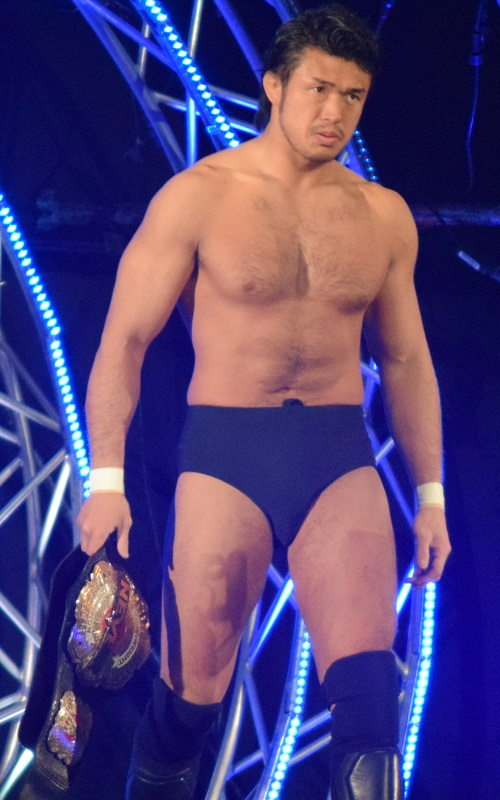
Katsuyori Shibata, who defended the NEVER Openweight Championship at Wrestle Kingdom 11

The NEVER Openweight Championship would also be defended at Wrestle Kingdom 11 with defending champion Katsuyori Shibata taking on Hirooki Goto. Shibata and Goto were high school classmates, who started a storyline rivalry against each other following Shibata's September 2012 return to NJPW. The rivalry lasted until January 2014, when the two came together to form a tag team, eventually winning both the 2014 World Tag League and the IWGP Tag Team Championship. The team disbanded in March 2016, when Goto joined the Chaos stable. Shibata and Goto did not face each other until the 2016 World Tag League, where, on December 5, Shibata and his tag team partner Yuji Nagata defeated Goto and Tomohiro Ishii with Shibata pinning Goto for the win. Five days later, Goto avenged the loss by pinning Shibata in a non-tournament tag team match and afterwards made a challenge for Shibata's NEVER Openweight Championship. The match was made official two days later. Prior to the match at Wrestle Kingdom 11, Shibata brought up the possibility of retiring the NEVER Openweight Championship.

On December 10, during the final day of the 2016 World Tag League, Los Ingobernables de Japón members Bushi, Evil and Sanada defeated Hiroyoshi Tenzan, Satoshi Kojima and Yuji Nagata in a six-man tag team match with Evil pinning Kojima, one third of the reigning NEVER Openweight 6-Man Tag Team Champions, for the win. Following the win, Bushi called out Kojima as well as his championship partners David Finlay and Ricochet. Two days later, NJPW announced that at Wrestle Kingdom 11 Finlay, Ricochet and Kojima would defend the NEVER Openweight 6-Man Tag Team Championship not only against the L.I.J. trio, but also against the Bullet Club trio of Bad Luck Fale, Hangman Page and Yujiro Takahashi and the Chaos trio of Tomohiro Ishii, Will Ospreay and Yoshi-Hashi in a four-team gauntlet match. On December 19, after Tomohiro Ishii was moved to the IWGP Tag Team Championship match, his spot in the Chaos team was taken over by Jado.

Other matches at Wrestle Kingdom 11 included the debuting Cody taking on Juice Robinson, Tiger Mask W making his second appearance following October's King of Pro-Wrestling, and Kyle O'Reilly defending the ROH World Championship against Adam Cole in a rematch from ROH's Final Battle event on December 2, 2016, where O'Reilly defeated Cole to become the new champion. The pre-show featured the annual "New Japan Rumble", a battle royal including both NJPW regulars and surprise entrants.

== Event ==
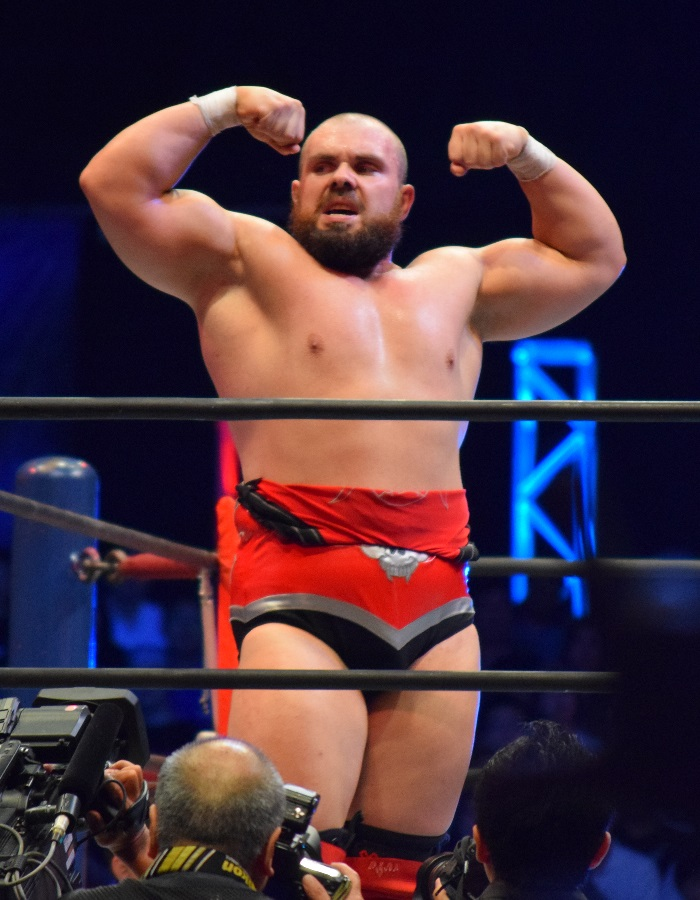
Michael Elgin, who won the New Japan Rumble on the Wrestle Kingdom 11 pre-show

The pre-show featured the annual New Japan Rumble, involving fourteen wrestlers, including surprise veteran entrants Hiro Saito, Kuniaki Kobayashi and Scott Norton. Michael Elgin, making his return from an orbital fracture, was the first man to enter the match and scored the last four eliminations over Saito, Norton, Hiroyoshi Tenzan and ROH wrestler Cheeseburger to win the match.

The first match on the main card saw Tiger Mask W, portrayed by Kota Ibushi, defeat Tiger the Dark, portrayed by ACH, with a Last Ride-style Tiger Driver.

The second match saw The Young Bucks (Matt Jackson and Nick Jackson) defend the IWGP Junior Heavyweight Tag Team Championship against Roppongi Vice (Beretta and Rocky Romero). Romero was left in a two-on-one disadvantage, when Beretta missed a dive out of the ring, landing on the entranceway. However, when The Young Bucks went for their finishing double-team maneuver, More Bang for Your Buck, on Romero, Beretta returned, stopping Matt and allowing Romero to pin Nick with a crucifix to win the match and make Roppongi Vice the new IWGP Junior Heavyweight Tag Team Champions. With the win, Romero set a new record by winning the title for the seventh time.

The third match was a gauntlet match for the NEVER Openweight 6-Man Tag Team Championship. The Bullet Club trio of Bad Luck Fale, Hangman Page and Yujiro Takahashi started the match against the Chaos trio of Jado, Will Ospreay and Yoshi-Hashi. After Takahashi had eliminated Chaos by pinning Jado with the Pimp Juice, the L.I.J. trio of Bushi, Evil and Sanada entered the match. The L.I.J. trio quickly eliminated Bullet Club with Sanada submitting Takahashi with the Skull End, which led to the final entrants, defending champions David Finlay, Ricochet and Satoshi Kojima, entering the match. In the end, Bushi misted Kojima as Evil distracted the referee of the match. Evil then hit Kojima with the Evil to win the match and make L.I.J. the new NEVER Openweight 6-Man Tag Team Champions.

Next up, Cody defeated Juice Robinson in his NJPW debut match, pinning him with the Cross Rhodes.

The fifth match of the main card saw Adam Cole defeat Kyle O'Reilly with the Last Shot to regain the ROH World Championship, winning the title for a record-setting third time.

Next up was a three-way match for the IWGP Tag Team Championship, contested between defending champions Guerrillas of Destiny (Tama Tonga and Tanga Loa), the 2016 World Tag League winners G.B.H. (Togi Makabe and Tomoaki Honma) and the team of Tomohiro Ishii and Toru Yano. Yano entered the match carrying both the IWGP Tag Team Championship belts and the World Tag League trophies, stolen from his two opposing teams. The finish saw Yano perform a blind tag. As the Guerrillas of Destiny faced off with Ishii, Yano snuck up behind them and hit them with the 634, a double low blow. Ishii then hit the champions with a double lariat, which led to Yano rolling up Loa to win the match and make himself and Ishii the new IWGP Tag Team Champions. The match became infamous for the excessive loud cursing in English by the Guerrillas of Destiny. This was the result of their mother telling them that they needed to stand out at the "WrestleMania of New Japan Pro-Wrestling".

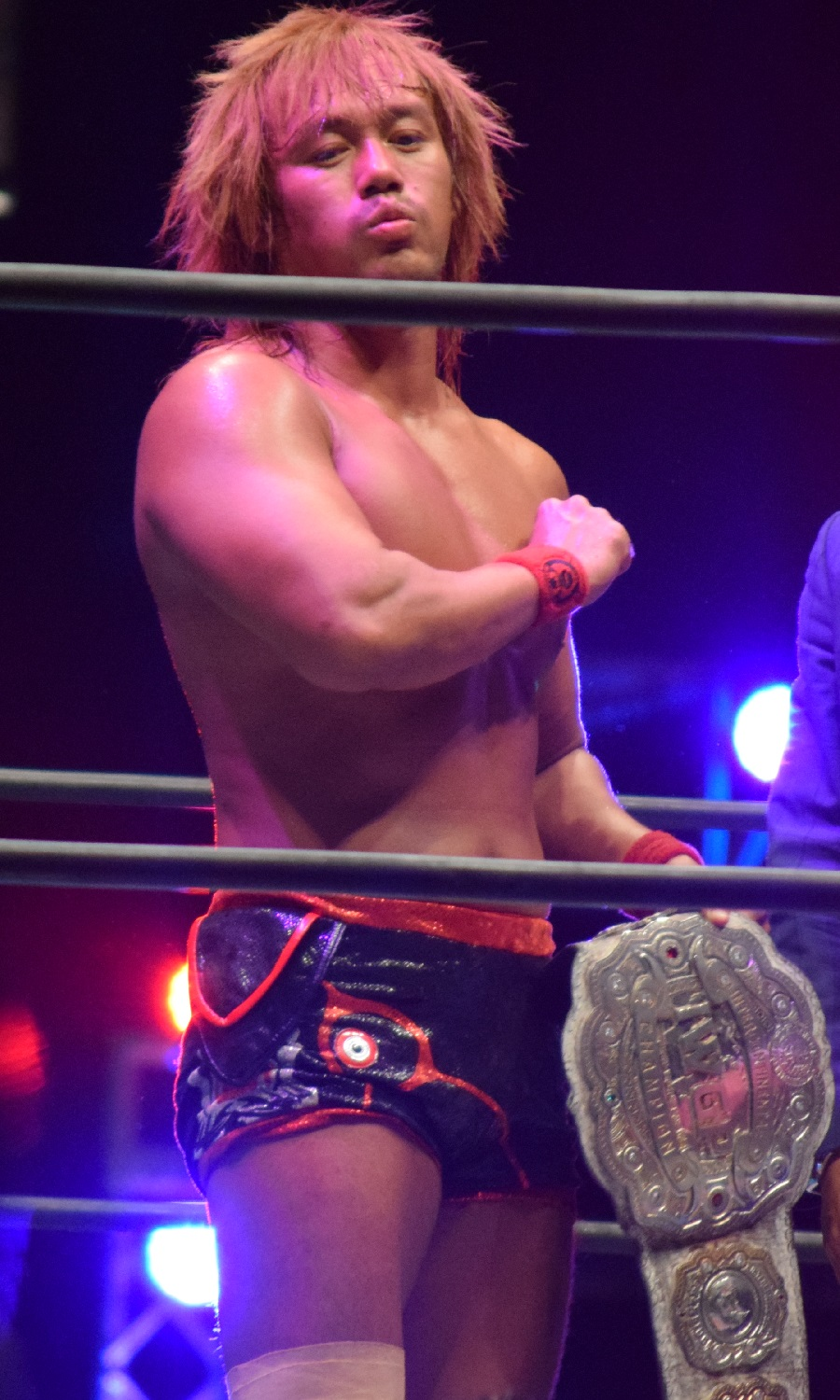
Tetsuya Naito, who successfully defended the IWGP Intercontinental Championship in the semi-main event

The seventh match on the main card featured Kushida defending the IWGP Junior Heavyweight Championship against Hiromu Takahashi. Near the finish of the match, Kushida locked Takahashi in his finishing hold, the Hoverboard Lock, but Takahashi managed to reach the ring ropes to force the referee to break the hold. Takahashi then dropped Kushida with a running Death Valley driver into the turnbuckles, before hitting him with the Time Bomb to win the match and become the new champion, ending Kushida's reign in his first defense.

The next match saw Hirooki Goto defeat Katsuyori Shibata with the GTR to become the new NEVER Openweight Champion. Afterwards, Shibata announced he wanted to distance himself from the NEVER Openweight Championship, having wrestled for it eleven times during 2016.

The semi-main event featured Tetsuya Naito defending the IWGP Intercontinental Championship against Hiroshi Tanahashi. In the end, Naito blocked Tanahashi's High Fly Flow with his knees and then hit him with his finishing maneuver, Destino, first swinging from the ring ropes and then normally in the ring to win the match and retain the title. Following the match, Naito showed respect to Tanahashi by bowing to him. The win marked a clean sweep for L.I.J., who left Wrestle Kingdom 11 holding three championships with all five members being champions. Backstage, Naito was confronted by Michael Elgin, who challenged him to a title match.

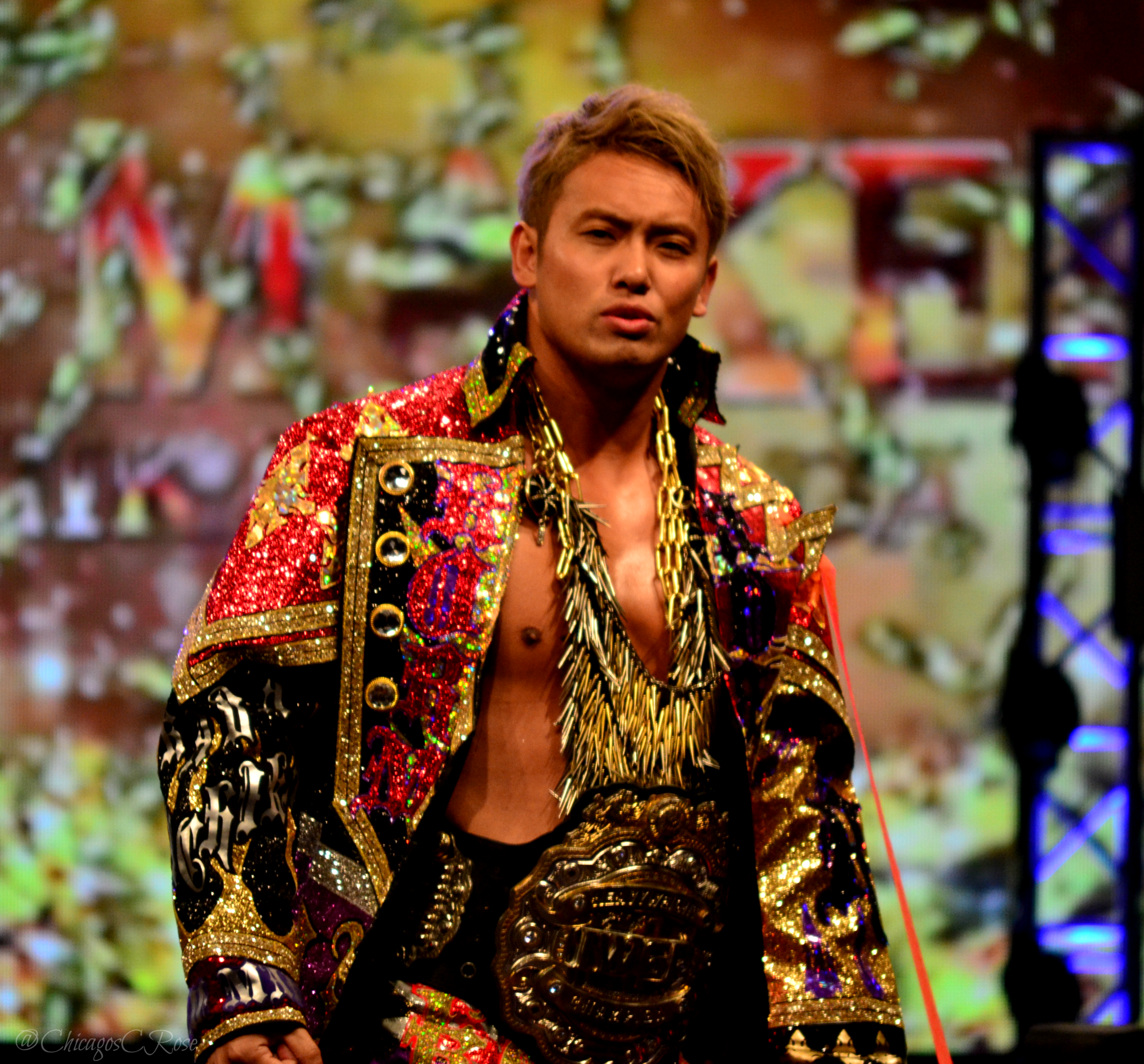
Kazuchika Okada, who made his second successful defense of the IWGP Heavyweight Championship in the main event

The main event of Wrestle Kingdom 11 in Tokyo Dome saw Kazuchika Okada defend the IWGP Heavyweight Championship against 2016 G1 Climax winner Kenny Omega. The match lasted 46 minutes and 45 seconds, making it the longest in the history of the January 4 Dome Show. The match featured dives from the ring over the safety barricade as well as table spots, with Omega first double stomping a table that was laid on top of Okada, before being back body dropped by Okada out of the ring through the table. At the end of the match, Omega hit Okada with the V-Trigger, before setting up his finishing maneuver, Katayoku no Tenshi. Okada, however, got out of the hold and dropped Omega with a spinning jumping tombstone piledriver. Okada then hit Omega with his finishing maneuver, the Rainmaker, to win the match and retain the IWGP Heavyweight Championship.

Following the match, Omega praised Okada as the "best wrestler in Japan, perhaps even the world", while Okada dubbed Omega the best foreign wrestler in the history of NJPW.

== Reception ==
Dave Meltzer of the Wrestling Observer Newsletter, who normally rates matches on a scale of zero to five stars, gave the main event a six-star rating, stating that "Kenny Omega and Kazuchika Okada may have put on the greatest match in pro wrestling history" and that the match transformed the two from "two of the best wrestlers in the industry to bonafide big card draws". Bryan Rose, also of the Wrestling Observer Newsletter, called Wrestle Kingdom 11 "[a] really great show, with the last four title matches delivering what they set out to accomplish", adding that it was "[n]ot the best top to bottom WK card of all time, but this was a great show that'll be tough to top in 2017". Mike Johnson of Pro Wrestling Insider called the top four matches "absolutely great" and the main event "one of the best matches [he had] ever seen". While the main event was also praised by industry veterans like Daniel Bryan, Mick Foley and Stone Cold Steve Austin, Jim Cornette, while calling the match "a great display of athleticism", ultimately panned it as an "exhibition of guys doing moves", stating that the match had "obvious cooperation and moves that nobody could really get up from". Okada himself caused some controversy among fans by stating on Twitter that his match with Omega was better than the match between AJ Styles and John Cena at WWE's Royal Rumble. Tokyo Sports, Wrestling Observer Newsletter, and Pro Wrestling Illustrated named the Wrestle Kingdom 11 main event the 2017 Match of the Year. Also, The Wrestling Observer Newsletter named Wrestle Kingdom the Best Major Show of the Year.

In 2020, fans voted the Okada vs Omega match as the best Wrestle Kingdom match of all time.

== Aftermath ==
Following Wrestle Kingdom 11, all of NJPW's championships were held by two stables; Chaos and Los Ingobernables de Japón, with members of Chaos holding the IWGP Heavyweight, NEVER Openweight, IWGP Tag Team and IWGP Junior Heavyweight Tag Team Championships, while members of L.I.J. held the IWGP Intercontinental, IWGP Junior Heavyweight and NEVER Openweight 6-Man Tag Team Championships. However, this ended the following day, when L.I.J. lost the NEVER Openweight 6-Man Tag Team Championship to Hiroshi Tanahashi, Manabu Nakanishi and Ryusuke Taguchi, in what marked Nakanishi's first title win in seven and a half years. The show also saw a major angle with the return of the Suzuki-gun stable, who attacked Chaos, ending with Minoru Suzuki laying out IWGP Heavyweight Champion Kazuchika Okada.

On January 6, Kenny Omega announced that he would be "stepping away from Japan to reassess [his] future", adding that he had no plan and was "weighing all options". Rumors quickly rose that Omega would be debuting for the WWE at the Royal Rumble on January 29. Adding to the rumors was John Cena posting a picture of Omega on his Instagram account just as he had done with AJ Styles prior to his debut at the 2016 Royal Rumble. In a video that was later pulled by WWE, Seth Rollins stated that he hoped Omega would be in the Royal Rumble match. Omega, in an interview with Tokyo Sports, claimed he was suffering from a burnout, having focused completely on winning the IWGP Heavyweight Championship at the Tokyo Dome, but failing despite perfect training and preparation. Omega was not booked on the Fantastica Mania 2017 tour and stated that he wished to also miss the next tour, starting on January 27. Omega's original NJPW contract was set to expire at the end of January 2017 with some believing he had already re-signed, although Omega himself denied signing any new contracts. On January 26, Omega announced in an interview with Wrestling Observer Radio that he had decided to stay with NJPW. Omega stated that he was going to be flying back to Japan in February to negotiate a new one-year deal with the promotion.

In May 2017, NJPW announced two rematches from Wrestle Kingdom 11 for their Dominion 6.11 in Osaka-jo Hall show on June 11; Kazuchika Okada versus Kenny Omega for the IWGP Heavyweight Championship and Tetsuya Naito versus Hiroshi Tanahashi for the IWGP Intercontinental Championship. Later, after Kushida had won the 2017 Best of the Super Juniors, a third Wrestle Kingdom 11 rematch between him and Hiromu Takahashi was also announced for the show. Kushida and Tanahashi went on to win their matches to become new champions, while the main event between Okada and Omega ended in a 60-minute time limit draw. In his review of the show, Dave Meltzer wrote that "Kazuchika Okada and Kenny Omega followed one of the greatest pro wrestling matches of all-time with an even better sequel", awarding the match a six and a quarter star rating. Okada and Omega faced each other for the third time on August 12 during the 2017 G1 Climax, where Omega was victorious in a non-title match, advancing to the final, but ended up losing to Tetsuya Naito in the final. At Wrestling Dontaku 2018, after defeating Hiroshi Tanahashi, Okada once again nominated Omega as his challenger for Dominion. Okada then suggested that the match had no time limit, with Omega accepting and adding a 2-out-of-3 falls stipulation. In Dominion 6.9 in Osaka-jo Hall, Omega defeated Okada with the score of 2-1 in a critically acclaimed match that Meltzer rated 7 stars.

== Results ==
No.	Results	Stipulations	Times
1^{P}	Michael Elgin won by last eliminating Cheeseburger	New Japan Rumble	25:13
2	Tiger Mask W (with Suzuko Mimori) defeated Tiger the Dark	Singles match	6:34
3	Roppongi Vice (Beretta and Rocky Romero) defeated The Young Bucks (Matt Jackson and Nick Jackson) (c)	Tag team match for the IWGP Junior Heavyweight Tag Team Championship	12:57
4	Los Ingobernables de Japón (Bushi, Evil and Sanada) defeated Taguchi Japan (David Finlay, Ricochet and Satoshi Kojima) (c), Bullet Club (Bad Luck Fale, Hangman Page and Yujiro Takahashi) and Chaos (Jado, Will Ospreay and Yoshi-Hashi)	Gauntlet match for the NEVER Openweight 6-Man Tag Team Championship	16:06
5	Cody defeated Juice Robinson	Singles match	9:37
6	Adam Cole defeated Kyle O'Reilly (c)	Singles match for the ROH World Championship	10:14
7	Chaos (Tomohiro Ishii and Toru Yano) defeated Guerrillas of Destiny (Tama Tonga and Tanga Loa) (c) and G.B.H. (Togi Makabe and Tomoaki Honma)	Three-way tag team match for the IWGP Tag Team Championship	12:24
8	Hiromu Takahashi defeated Kushida (c)	Singles match for the IWGP Junior Heavyweight Championship	16:15
9	Hirooki Goto defeated Katsuyori Shibata (c)	Singles match for the NEVER Openweight Championship	16:17
10	Tetsuya Naito (c) defeated Hiroshi Tanahashi	Singles match for the IWGP Intercontinental Championship	25:25
11	Kazuchika Okada (c) (with Gedo) defeated Kenny Omega (with Matt Jackson and Nick Jackson)	Singles match for the IWGP Heavyweight Championship	46:45
(c) / – the champion(s) heading into the match; P / – the match was broadcast on the pre-show

=== New Japan Rumble ===
Order	Name	Order eliminated	By	Time
1	Michael Elgin	—	—	Winner
2	Billy Gunn	2	Elgin	05:46
3	Bone Soldier	1	Cheeseburger	03:50
4	Cheeseburger	13	Elgin	25:13
5	Jyushin Thunder Liger	5	Tiger Mask	12:40
6	Kuniaki Kobayashi	3	Tiger Mask	08:59
7	Tiger Mask	6	Taguchi	12:49
8	Manabu Nakanishi	4	Multiple wrestlers	12:00
9	Ryusuke Taguchi	9	Norton	21:02
10	Yoshitatsu	7	Nagata	16:26
11	Yuji Nagata	8	Saito	19:20
12	Hiroyoshi Tenzan	12	Elgin	23:34
13	Hiro Saito	10	Elgin	22:24
14	Scott Norton	11	Elgin	22:38

=== Gauntlet match ===
Elimination	Wrestler	Team	Eliminated by	Elimination move	Time	Ref.
1	Jado	Chaos	Yujiro Takahashi	Pinned after a Snap DDT	07:30	
2	Yujiro Takahashi	Bullet Club	Sanada	Submitted to a Dragon Sleeper	09:36	
3	Satoshi Kojima	Taguchi Japan	Evil	Pinned after a STO	16:06	
Winners:	Los Ingobernables de Japón (Bushi, Evil and Sanada)					

== See also ==
- 2017 in professional wrestling
- Professional wrestling at the Tokyo Dome
