= Taku Yashiro =

Japanese voice actor (born 1993)

- 八代 拓
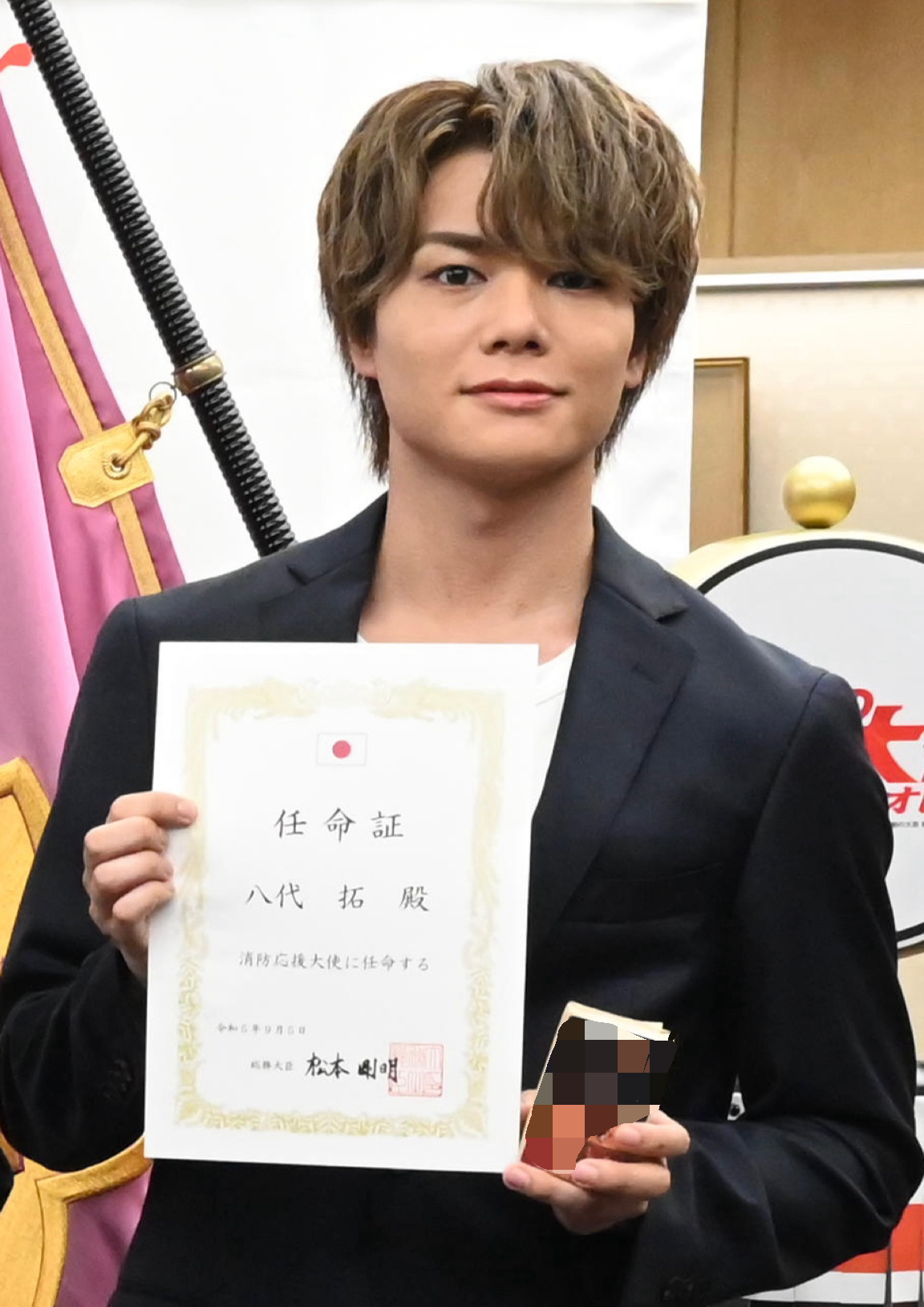
- Born: January 6, 1993 (age 33); Iwate Prefecture, Japan
- Occupation: Voice actor
- Years active: 2013–present
- Agent: VIMS
- Notable work: Tiger Mask W as Naoto Azuma / Tiger Mask; Domestic Girlfriend as Natsuo Fujii; Darwin's Game as Ryūji Maesaka; King of Prism as Kakeru Juuouin

Taku Yashiro (八代 拓, Yashiro Taku; born January 6, 1993) is a Japanese voice actor affiliated with VIMS talent agency. He won the Best Rookie Actor Award at the 12th Seiyu Awards.

== Filmography ==
=== Anime series ===
List of voice performances in anime
Year	Title	Role	Notes	Source
2013	Silver Spoon	Friend from Junior High B, Worker B		
2013	Miss Monochrome The Animation	Additional Voice		
2014	Yowamushi Pedal	Spectator	season 2	
2014	Jinsei	Additional Voice, Fukukaichou A		
2014	Miss Monochrome: The Animation - Soccer Hen	Additional Voice		
2014	One Week Friends	Classmate		
2014	Sabagebu!	Customer		
2014	Wolf Girl and Black Prince	Festival Visitor, Hitting On Boy, Schoolboy		
2014	Riddle Story of Devil	Prison Guard B		
2014	Persona 4: The Animation	Respondent	ep 4	
2014	Fairy Tail	Doriate		
2014	Yu-Gi-Oh! Arc-V	Battle Beast		
2015	Gangsta.	Gawain		
2015	Star-Myu	Student, Reporter, chairman, PR Staff		
2015	Is It Wrong to Try to Pick Up Girls in a Dungeon?	Adventurer D		
2015	Food Wars!: Shokugeki no Soma	Various characters		
2015	Maria the Virgin Witch	English Soldier C		
2015	Lance N' Masques	Knight, Delinquent		
2015	Aldnoah.Zero	Martian Soldier	ep 17	
2015	Monster Musume	Purse Snatcher		
2015	The Heroic Legend of Arslan	Soldier		
2015	Kin-iro Mosaic	Teacher A		
2015	Mobile Suit Gundam: Iron-Blooded Orphans	Carta Guard		
2015	Gintama	Phoenix		
2015	Dimension W	Policeman		
2016	Bubuki Buranki	Man in black	ep 1	
2016	Fairy Tail Zero	Craftsman, Wizard		
2016	Active Raid	Policeman B	ep 1	
2016–2018	Aikatsu Stars!	Subaru Yūki		
2016	Shōnen Maid	Hayato		
2016	The Lost Village	Hayato		
2016	The Morose Mononokean	Norito Saga		
2016–2017	Tiger Mask W	Naoto Azuma, Tiger Mask		
2016	Show By Rock!!#	Orion		
2016	Please Tell Me! Galko-chan	Norisuke		
2016	Haven't You Heard? I'm Sakamoto	Delinquent, Schoolboy, Thug		
2016	Food Wars! The Second Plate	Staff A		
2016	Norn9	Subordinate		
2016	Battery	Takatsuki Shuuhei	ep 11	
2016	This Boy Is a Professional Wizard	Toyohi Utsumi		
2016	Girlish Number	Voice Actor E, Employee, Event staff, Guest		
2017	Children of the Whales	Shikoku		
2017	Yu-Gi-Oh! VRAINS	Flame		
2017	Clockwork Planet	Lymmons		
2017	Rage of Bahamut: Virgin Soul	visitor	ep 7	
2017	Is It Wrong to Try to Pick Up Girls in a Dungeon?: Sword Oratoria	Scott, Allen Fromel		
2017	The iDOLM@STER SideM	Tsubasa Kashiwagi		
2017	Aho-Girl	Ryūichi Kurosaki		
2017	Nana Maru San Batsu	Wataru Maruyama		
2017	Piace: Watashi no Italian	Ei Oreki		
2017	ACCA: 13-Territory Inspection Dept.	Rail		
2017	Dynamic Chord	Shinomune Sumiya		
2017	Sengoku Night Blood	Kamanosuke Yuri		
2018	The Thousand Musketeers	Brown Bess		
2018	Bakumatsu	Yamazaki Susumu		
2018	Hinomaru Sumo	Rion Sawai		
2018	That Time I Got Reincarnated as a Slime	Ifrit		
2018	Jingai-san no Yome	Ichiya Mokusaibashi		
2019	Boogiepop and Others	Masaki Taniguchi		
2019	Grand Chase	Zero		
2019	B-Project: Zecchou*Emotion	Teramitsu Haruhi		
2019	Domestic Girlfriend	Natsuo Fujii		
2019–2022	Kaguya-sama: Love Is War	Tsubasa Tanuma		
2019	The Rising of the Shield Hero	Van Reichnott		
2019	Bakumatsu Crisis	Yamazaki Susumu		
2019	King of Prism: Shiny Seven Stars	Kakeru Juuouin		
2019	Ahiru no Sora	Shinichi Yasuhara		
2019	After School Dice Club	Yūto Aoshima		
2019	Outburst Dreamer Boys	Takumi Sekiya		
2019	Fire Force	Vulcan Joseph		
2019–2020	Sword Art Online: Alicization – War of Underworld	Iskahn		
2020	Sleepy Princess in the Demon Castle	Cursed Musician		
2020	Darwin's Game	Ryūji Maesaka		
2020	Kakushigoto	Aogu Shiji		
2020	Listeners	Lyde		
2020	Yu-Gi-Oh! Sevens	Tatsuhisa Kamijō		
2020	Shachibato! President, It's Time for Battle!	Raiba		
2021	Show By Rock!! Stars!!	Orion		
2021	Project Scard: Scar on the Praeter	Kouga Tatsuma		
2021–2023	Horimiya	Kōichi Shindō	Also The Missing Pieces	
2021	Ex-Arm	Kimura		
2021	Burning Kabaddi	Shintarō Kizaki		
2021–present	The Saint's Magic Power Is Omnipotent	Jude		
2021	To Your Eternity	Gugu (adolescent)		
2021	Peach Boy Riverside	Chūki		
2021	Re-Main	Keita Kakihana		
2021	Tsukimichi: Moonlit Fantasy	Lime Latte		
2021	Banished from the Hero's Party	Ares		
2022	Salaryman's Club	Azuma Tachibana		
2022	The Dawn of the Witch	Kudo		
2022	Aoashi	Keiji Togashi		
2022	Shine On! Bakumatsu Bad Boys!	Rashōmaru		
2022	Harem in the Labyrinth of Another World	Michio Kaga		
2022	Raven of the Inner Palace	Wei Qing		
2022	Shinobi no Ittoki	Himura Takane		
2022	Bibliophile Princess	Jean		
2022	Play It Cool, Guys	Kurosaki		
2022	Chainsaw Man	Hirokazu Arai		
2023	Endo and Kobayashi Live! The Latest on Tsundere Villainess Lieselotte	Leon Schache		
2023	The Angel Next Door Spoils Me Rotten	Itsuki Akasawa		
2023	Opus Colors	Anju Ikaruga		
2023	A Galaxy Next Door	Ichiro Kuga		
2023	Pokémon	Friede		
2023	Edens Zero	Laguna Husert	Season 2	
2023	Rurouni Kenshin	Sagara Sanosuke		
2023	Undead Girl Murder Farce	Tsugaru Shinuchi		
2023	Firefighter Daigo: Rescuer in Orange	Shun Onoda		
2023	MF Ghost	Sena Moroboshi		
2023	Overtake!	Toshiki Tokumaru		
2023	Dark Gathering	Oswald		
2023	Ron Kamonohashi's Forbidden Deductions	Spitz Feier		
2024	The Demon Prince of Momochi House	Kasha		
2024	The Weakest Tamer Began a Journey to Pick Up Trash	Latroa		
2024	Villainess Level 99	Edwin Valschein		
2024	Welcome Home	Yūki Hirai		
2024	Suicide Squad Isekai	Rick Flag		
2024	Is It Wrong to Try to Pick Up Girls in a Dungeon?	Allen Fromel	Season 5	
2025	Honey Lemon Soda	Satoru Seto		
2025	Babanba Banban Vampire	Ken Shinozuka / Franken		
2025	Sakamoto Days	Shishiba		
2025	The Brilliant Healer's New Life in the Shadows	Zonde		
2025	Araiguma Calcal-dan	Logical		
2025	Classic Stars	Lost Beethoven		
2025	Everyday Host	Hajime		
2025	Sword of the Demon Hunter: Kijin Gentōshō	Jinta		
2025	Black Butler: Emerald Witch Arc	Ludger		
2025	My Hero Academia: Vigilantes	Number 6 / Rokuro Nomura / Scarred Man		
2025	Shabake	Sasuke		
2025	Ninja vs. Gokudo	Ballon d'Or		
2026	Hana-Kimi	Izumi Sano		
2026	Agents of the Four Seasons: Dance of Spring	Rindō Azami		
2026	Always a Catch!	Raimondo Cigata		
2026	Please Excuse My Younger Brothers	Raku Narita		
2026	Young Ladies Don't Play Fighting Games	Seshiro		
2026	Nia Liston: The Merciless Maiden	Anzel		
2026	Suikoden: The Anime	Luca Blight		
2027	Dengeki Daisy	Tasuku Kurosaki		
2027	Because I, the True Saint, Was Banished, That Country Is Done For!	Nigel Linchigham		
2027	Akane-banashi	Asagao Konjakutei		

=== Original video animation (OVA) ===
List of voice performances in OVA
Year	Title	Role	Source
2012	Code Geass: Akito the Exiled	G1 Operator	
2014	Prince of Tennis II OVA vs. Genius 10	Tetsuhito Fuwa	

=== Original net animation (ONA) ===
List of voice performances in ONA
Year	Title	Role	Source
2021	Hetalia: World Stars	Luxembourg	
2023	Junji Ito Maniac: Japanese Tales of the Macabre	Yamazaki	

=== Anime films ===
List of voice performances in film
Year	Title	Role	Source
2016	King of Prism by Pretty Rhythm	Kakeru Jūōin	
2016	Aikatsu Stars! the Movie	Subaru Yūki	
2016	Selector Destructed Wixoss	Staff	
2017	Fairy Tail Movie 2: Dragon Cry	Gapri	
2017	King of Prism: Pride the Hero	Kakeru Jūōin	
2018	K: Seven Stories	Daichi Yamata	
2020	The Island of Giant Insects	Tsuge Hiroshi	
2022	Blue Thermal	Harukaze Aihara	
2022	Toku Touken Ranbu: Hanamaru ~Setsugetsuka~	Buzen Gou	
2022	Kaguya-sama: Love Is War – The First Kiss That Never Ends	Tsubasa Tanuma	
2023	Maboroshi	Daisuke Sasakura	
2025	Virgin Punk: Clockwork Girl	Lewis Gaudi	
2026	The Keeper of the Camphor Tree		

=== Video games ===
List of voice performances in video games
Year	Title	Role	Notes	Source
2015	JoJo's Bizarre Adventure: Eyes of Heaven	Axl RO		
2015	The iDOLM@STER SideM	Tsubasa Kashiwagi		
2015	Dynamic Chord feat.KYOHSO	Shinomune Sumiya		
2016	Ikémen Revolution: Love & Magic in Wonderland	Edgar Bright	iOS, Android	
2017	Ikémen Sengoku: Love Across Time	Imagawa Yoshimoto	iOS, Android	
2017	Ikémen Vampire: Temptation in the Dark	Dazai Osamu	iOS, Android	
2017	Fire Emblem Heroes	Ephraim	Smartphone game	
2017	Final Fantasy XIV: Stormblood	Magnai Oronir	MMORPG	
2018	Touken Ranbu	Buzen Gō	Browser game	
2019	Edge of Awakening	Kanō Tan'yū, Yamidara	iOS, Android	
2020	Cupid Parasite	Raul Aconite		
2021	Sword Art Online: Unleash Blading	Iskahn	Smartphone game	
2021	Rune Factory 5	Terry		
2021	Paradigm Paradox	Tokio Takato		
2021	The Caligula Effect 2	MU-kun		
2022	Cupid Parasite -Sweet & Spicy Darling.-	Raul Aconite		
2022	Gate of Nightmares	Ranmaru	iOS, Android	
2022	Arknights	WIndflit	iOS, Android	
2023	Loop8: Summer of Gods	Hori		
2023	Sword Art Online: Last Recollection	Iskahn		
2023	Fire Emblem Engage	Ephraim		
2024	Tengoku Struggle -strayside-	Ishikawa Goemon		
2025	Ash Echoes	Boreas		
2025	Trails in the Sky 1st Chapter	Agate Crosner		

=== Drama CDs ===
Audio drama performances
Year	Title	Role	Notes	Sources
2018	Aho Ero	Takatou		
2018	Mister Fiction	Tetsu Amamiya		
2021	Fantastic Night	Touya		

=== Dubbing ===
- Cinderella, James (James Corden)
- Gen V, Luke Riordan / Golden Boy (Patrick Schwarzenegger)
- Good Sam, Dr. Isan M. Shah (Omar Maskati)
- Haunted Mansion, Ben Matthias (LaKeith Stanfield)
- High Strung Free Dance, Zander (Thomas Doherty)
- John Wick: Chapter 4, Mr. Nobody / The Tracker (Shamier Anderson)
- Mid90s, Ray (Na-Kel Smith)
- Peninsula, Captain Seo (Koo Kyo-hwan)
- The Pembrokeshire Murders, Jack Wilkins (Steffan Cennydd)
- The Running Man, Bradley Throckmorton (Daniel Ezra)
- Space Jam: A New Legacy, Darius James (Ceyair J. Wright)
- The Wedding Invitation, Graham (Eoin Macken)

== Publications ==
=== Photobooks ===
Year	Title	Publisher	ISBN
2019	Taku	Shufu to Seikatsu-sha	ISBN 978-4391153750
