= List of Tiger Mask W characters =

The anime series Tiger Mask W, created by Toei Animation, features a variety of fictional characters. The series focuses on Naoto Azuma, a wrestler who goes by the moniker Tiger Mask, and his friend and rival Takuma Fujii, who goes by Tiger the Dark. They are supported by friends and family, and they interact regularly with characters from New Japan Pro-Wrestling (NJPW), some of whom are real-life pro wrestlers from the federation, as well as a rival federation called Global Wrestling Monopoly (GWM). The character design for the anime was done by Hisashi Kagawa, who worked on anime shows such as The Kindaichi Case Files, Saikano, Fresh Pretty Cure!, and Sailor Moon.

== Main characters ==
=== Naoto Azuma / Tiger Mask ===
Naoto Azuma (東ナオト, Azuma Naoto) / Tiger Mask (タイガーマスク, Taigā Masuku) (21-year-old) is the protagonist of the series. He was formerly trained at the Zipangu Pro-Wrestling team, until rival team GWM (Global Wrestling Monopoly) destroyed the training gym. Angry, he decides to fight against the Tiger's Den group which is affiliated with GWM. He initially allies himself with the NJPW wrestlers, who eventually help them develop his signature technique, Tiger Drive. After losing during the War Games and watching Tiger the Dark being unmasked by The Third, he realizes his hated rival was in fact his friend Takuma. Naoto shares his identity with him and the two friends reconcile. Now even hungrier for revenge, Naoto desperately seeks a match with The Third, with Miss X binding Naoto to a contract to get him his match, in exchange of betraying the NJPW, which makes him sink to commit fouls and lose his reputation. Tiger Mask is however cruelly utilized as a sacrificial pawn for GWM's schemes, while leaving him with eroded trust by his NJPW peers. He eventually regains their trust after saving Nagata and reforms their alliance against the GWM. He later develops a new move called Tiger Fang which he uses to defeat Kevin. During a tag team match with The third he was unmasked after having his mask ripped off. During the final battle against The Third he uses a new mask made of his and Tiger the Dark's and battles The Third. Using a combination of his own moves and Takuma's, he's able to injure and defeat The Third with his Tiger Fang. He and Takuma decide to part ways and fight abroad under the name Tiger Mask W (タイガーマスクW(ダブル); Taigā Masuku Daburu) using the same mask design with him moving to Mexico to transfer over and officially join the wrestling federation there.

His killer moves are the Tiger Drive, where he pushes an opponent to the corner uses a somersault kick followed by a knee strike on the chest and finished with a hold using his knees. His final technique is the Tiger Fang where he assaults the opponent with an axe kick followed by a knee strike on the face, thus resembling a tiger's bite. He also learns Takuma's Darkness Driver and Darkness Hold. He is the new bearer of the Tiger Mask persona, sharing a name with original Tiger Mask, Naoto Date. He is voiced by Taku Yashiro.

=== Takuma Fujii / Tiger the Dark ===
Takuma Fujii (藤井タクマ, Fujii Takuma) (21-year-old). Initially affiliated with Zipangu Pro-Wrestling, his father worked at the gym and was injured during its destruction. Because of this he also yearns to defeat the Tiger's Den and GWM and begins to train to become a professional wrestler, taking the persona Tiger the Dark (タイガー・ザ・ダーク, Taigā za Dāku). He plans to join the Tiger's Den to destroy them from the inside. He eventually got his chance at revenge during his title match against The Third, discovering he was his target all along. While Takuma almost managed to defeat The Third, the injuries inflicted by Naoto take their toll and succumbs to The Third's Sacrifice, leaving him crippled. After being unmasked by The Third, Tiger Mask shares his identity with him and the two friends reconcile. He undergoes rehabilitation with Ruriko's help in order to return to wrestling and he is now training with Naoto again and made his return to the ring as part of team NJPW during the Final Wars. After Naoto's mask is ripped by The Third, he shares half his mask with Naoto to allow him to fight. After The Third's defeat the two part ways deciding to fight abroad, with him moving over to North America to officially join the wrestling federation there, and calling themselves Tiger Mask W they share the same mask design combining both their previous masks.

His killer moves are the Darkness Driver, a piledriver where he slams the opponent's head on the floor with his knees. The Darkness Hold, where he performs and powerful arm hold using his arms and legs. Finally he develops a new move called Crossbow, where he ducks and performs a jump with his arms crossed, striking the opponent's jaw and then releasing both arms, catapulting the target. He is voiced by Yuichiro Umehara. He is the anime's equivalent of Black Tiger in New Japan Pro Wrestling. To help promote the anime series, the real-life NJPW introduced a Tiger the Dark wrestler, with A. C. H. behind the mask, to feud with the real-life Tiger Mask W, with Kota Ibushi behind the mask.

=== Haruna Takaoka / Spring Tiger ===
Haruna Takaoka (高岡 春奈, Takaoka Haruna) (19-year-old) is the niece of Kentaro Takaoka, the only man who knew that Naoto Date was Tiger Mask in the original Tiger Mask series, then the daughter of his younger sister Yoko Takaoka. She is the only person aside from Kentaro who knows that Naoto Azuma is the new Tiger Mask, and also serves as his agent. She has romantic feelings towards him, but hides it and is reciprocated in the ending. She is revealed to have a well trained physique and is a competent fighter on her own league, taking the identity Spring Tiger (スプリングタイガー, Supuringu Taigā). Her specialty is to attack her opponent's legs with strikes and holds. Although she has desires to wrestle, her mother disapproves because the truth about her hero Tiger Mask shocked her as a child, which is why she keeps her training and wrestling activities a secret for her family. Following Tiger's Den defeat and the subsequent departure of Naoto, she is recruited by Miss X in order to serve as the main fighter of her new organization. She reluctantly has her wrestling name changed to Springer (スプリンガー, Supuringā) after Miss X suggests her name is too long according to her research. A female Tiger Mask iteration, called Tiger Dream, was played by female wrestler Candy Okutsu. She bears a resemblance to the Tiger Ladies from episode 18 of the anime series Cat's Eye. The Springer's costume is modeled after female pro-wrestler Natsumi Maki. She is voiced by Suzuko Mimori, who ushered and introduced the real-life Tiger Mask W to the ring during Wrestle Kingdom 11.

=== Kentaro Takaoka ===
Kentaro Takaoka (高岡 拳太郎, Takaoka Kentarō) is Naoto Date's inseparable friend from the original Tiger Mask series. Takaoka was previously known to portray Yellow Devil. He left the world of puroresu at the turn of the century, since an unknown accident caused severe and permanent damage to his right leg, forcing him to use a forearm crutch to walk around. He now runs the motorcycle shop Takaoka Motors but also helps Azuma in his training. Kentaro, like his niece, is aware that Azuma is the new Tiger Mask. He is voiced by Ryōichi Tanaka, who reprises the role from Tiger Mask.

=== Daisuke Fujii ===
Daisuke Fujii (藤井大助, Fujii Daisuke) is Takuma's father and the manager of Zipangu. He is seriously injured when Zipangu is destroyed, and is thus in the hospital. He has suspicions, based on Azuma's comments to him in the first episode, that Azuma may be the new Tiger Mask, but has not made any attempt to confirm it. He is modeled after the Japanese pro-wrestlers Hayabusa and Shinjiro Otani. He is voiced by Takeshi Kusao.

=== Ruriko Yamashina ===
Ruriko Yamashina (山科ルリコ, Yamashina Ruriko) is Daisuke's nurse at the hospital and the daughter of a huge medical corporation group's owner. Naoto has a crush on her, but holds back because of the situation he is in, but she loves Takuma. She holds a deep admiration for Tiger Mask, which eventually motivated her to work for the GWM in order to follow wrestling more closely, although she does not know that Tiger Mask is in fact Naoto. However, disillusioned by GWM's cruelty and Tiger Mask's actions with the Miracles, she resigned her position and returned to her previous work in order to aid in Takuma's rehabilitation. She is modeled after Junko Tachibana from Tiger Mask II, with Ruriko Wakatsuki's first name. She is voiced by Chiemi Chiba.

=== Hikari Kuruma ===
Hikari Kuruma (来間ひかり, Kuruma Hikari) is a reporter for Monthly Pro-Wrestling World who is mainly interested in both Tiger Mask and Tiger the Dark as well as their secrecy. She is voiced by Izumi Kitta.

== NJPW characters ==
New Japan Pro-Wrestling is one of the major pro-wrestling organizations in Japan. Many of the professional wrestler characters from the real-life NJPW are depicted in the anime series.

=== Kazuchika Okada ===
Kazuchika Okada (岡田 和睦 (オカダ・カズチカ), Okada Kazuchika) is a professional wrestler for NJPW who joins Tiger Mask in his fight against GWM. In the anime, he is introduced as a NJPW champion, which the real Okada was in real life at the time. He is voiced by Masakazu Morita.

=== Hiroshi Tanahashi ===
Hiroshi Tanahashi (棚橋 弘至, Tanahashi Hiroshi), nicknamed It's-the-Ace (イッツザエース, Ittsu za Ēsu) is a NJPW wrestling ace who helps Naoto in training and during the unlocked world tournament. He is voiced by Kenichi Suzumura.

=== Ryu Wakamatsu ===
Ryu Wakamatsu (若松龍, Wakamatsu Ryū) is a NJPW wrestler who goes by the ring name Dragon Young (ドラゴンヤング, Doragon Yangu). He is a big fan of Kazuchika Okada and has a crush on Haruna. He is voiced by Daisuke Kishio.

=== Yuji Nagata ===
Yuji Nagata (永田裕志, Nagata Yūji) is a former NJPW wrestler who is now involved in its player management. His speciality is an armlock infamously called "White Eyes Armlock", as Nagata's eyes turn white whenever he performs it, giving him a terrifying appearance. His rule is the same of Giant Baba from the first anime. He is voiced by Masaki Terasoma.

=== Togi Makabe ===
Togi Makabe (真壁刀義, Makabe Tōgi) is a NJPW wrestler who enjoys sweets and even blogs about them. Sometimes he loses motivation if he cannot have them. He is voiced by the actual wrestler.

=== Tomoaki Honma ===
Tomoaki Honma (本間 朋晃, Honma Tomoaki) is an NJPW fighter known for his signature Kokeshi move. He can be very heated in a fight, and other times he remains calm. He is voiced by Masaya Takatsuka.

=== Tomohiro Ishii ===
Tomohiro Ishii (石井 智宏, Ishii Tomohiro) is an NJPW wrestler known as the bull fighter. He wears a black T-shirt with a bulldog with spiked collar. He joins a battle royal event with Tiger Mask. He is voiced by Kenji Nomura.

=== Yoshi-Hashi ===
Yoshi-Hashi is a NJPW wrestler who is active as a heel wrestler. He is part of the Chaos wrestling stable of which Kazuchika Okada is the leader. He is voiced by Hiroshi Okamoto.

=== Tama Tonga ===
Tama Tonga (タマ・トンガ, Tama Tonga) is a NJPW wrestler associated with the Bullet Club group as a tag player. He has a painted face. He is voiced by Naoki Imamura.

=== Bad Luck Fale ===
Bad Luck Fale (バッドラック・ファレ, Baddorakku Fare) is an NJPW wrestler and member of the Bullet Club as an underboss. He has a monstrous power as well as a monstrous appetite. He is voiced by Keiji Hirai.

=== Kenny Omega ===
Kenny Omega (ケニーオメガ, Kenī Omega) is the leader of the Bullet Club. He is versatile and cunning. He is voiced by Hideyuki Hori, the same as Tatsuo Aku's in Tiger Mask II.

=== Tetsuya Naito ===
Tetsuya Naito (内藤 哲也, Naitō Tetsuya) is a NJPW wrestler who is uncontrollable and likes to do whatever he wants. He tends to mix Spanish words with a Latino accent in his phrases. His speciality is a technique called "Destino", where he grabs his opponent from behind, performs a 360° jump while holding one of the opponent's arms and using the momentum, slams them into the ring. He is voiced by Kappei Yamaguchi.

=== Toru Yano ===
Toru Yano (矢野 通, Yano Tōru) is a founding member of the Chaos stable. He is described as being comical. He is voiced by Kazumasa Fukagawa.

=== Evil ===
Evil (イービル, Ībiru) is a NJPW wrestler and a member of the wrestling stable Los Ingobernables de Japón, where he tag teams with Tetsuya Naito. His ring entrance involves carrying a sickle. His speciality is a technique called "The EVIL", where he holds his opponent, kicks their legs from behind and subsequently uses the momentum to slam them into the ring. He is voiced by Fukushi Ochiai.

=== Gedo ===
Gedo (外道, Gedō) is known as one of the best technical wrestlers in NJPW. He manages Kazuchika Okada and has an older brother. He is voiced by Eiji Takemoto.

=== Kota Ibushi ===
Kota Ibushi (飯伏幸太, Ibushi Kōta) is a NJPW wrestler. He is voiced by the actual wrestler.

== GWM characters ==
The Global Wrestling Monopoly (グローバル・レスリング・モノポリー, Gurōbaru Resuringu Monoporī) (GWM) is an American wrestling federation that serves as the rival to Tiger Mask and his colleagues.

=== Miss X ===
Miss X (ミスX, Misu X) is the boss of GWM and the manager of Tiger's Den. A beautiful yet deadly woman, she has a strong physique and fights under the name X Woman (Xウーマン, X Ūman), albeit she does so unmasked. She has no defined technique, even if she uses Charlotte Flair's Figure-Eight Leglock, but is a strong fighter. As the frontal authority of the Tiger's Den, she plans most of the schemes to get rid of Tiger Mask, and at the same time increase GWM's influence over Japan to further cement their lucrative plans for a world monopoly. An expert manager and cold planner, she has at many times successfully put Tiger Mask in dangerous situation through careful planning and business know-how. Although an enemy of Tiger Mask for the most part, her management position makes her a more direct rival of Haruna who acts as Tiger Mask's agent. Despite former hostilities, she takes the defeat of the Tiger's Den gracefully and subsequently decides to found her own wrestling organization, also called GWM, standing for Girls Wrestling Movement, recruiting Haruna as her ace fighter along with Milk and Mint. She uses the former Zipangu Gym as her Headquarters. Her real name is Sandra (サンドラ, Sandora). She is modeled after Anne Hathaway, and Julia Dietze's costume in the movie Iron Sky. She is voiced by Yū Kobayashi.

=== Lady ===
Lady (レディ, Redei) is the secretary of Miss X and the niece of Mister X. She is mostly calm and expressionless. She is frequently seen making brief appearances in other cities when the protagonists travel, cryptically stating she "has businesses there" before retreating. After Tiger Den's defeat, she follows Miss X in her new organization. She is voiced by Yukiko Morishita.

=== Mister X ===
Mister X (ミスターＸ, Misutā X) is the boss of the Tiger's Den stable, then Miss X is under his leadership. He holds a strong grudge against the new Tiger Mask, remembering the original traitor. He is voiced by Hidekatsu Shibata, who reprises the role from the original Tiger Mask series fifty years prior.

=== Yellow Devil / The Third ===
Yellow Devil (イエロー・デビル, Ierō Debiru) is a long-time enemy of Naoto and Takuma's. He is the grandson of Tiger the Great, the original Tiger Mask's ultimate enemy who was brutally killed by him. Three years ago, he helped carry out the attack against the Zipangu gym. During the fight he injures and recruits Takuma for the Tiger's Den. He then disappears and assumes a gray tiger mask and the ring name Tiger the Great the Third (タイガー・ザ・グレート・ザ・サード, Taigā za Gurēto za Sādo), more commonly known as The Third (ザ・サード, Za Sādo). Now serving as GWM heavyweight world champion and the rightful successor of Tiger's Den serving as the leader of its Four Heavenly Kings (also called 4 Tigers). He's strong enough to easily overpower a malfunctioning Blackout on his own, despite taking the joint-effort of Takuma, Kevin and Odin to even damage him. He was formerly trained by Fukuwara Mask, with each discovering the identity of the other during the War Games. As a result, both use similar techniques as well. He makes his fighting debut as The Third in the War Games where he battles Takuma as a challenger for the belt. The Third reveals he's Takuma's long sought target. Although initially gaining the advantage, the injuries sustained by his fight with Naoto prevent Takuma from defeating The Third and is crippled by his Sacrifice and subsequently unmasked. He returns as one of the main fighters for the Final Wars, and eventually rips Naoto's mask. In the final fight he faces Naoto as Tiger Mask W using half his and Takuma's mask. Although able to injure Naoto through a chain of Devil's Tornadoes his arm is also injured by him which ultimately causes his defeat as he falls to Naoto's Tiger Fang, finishing Naoto and Takuma's long sought revenge. His defeat causes the end of the Tiger's Den.

As Yellow Devil his specialties were the Devil's Tornado, a hand slash that uses body rotation and the Devil's Crush, a vicious piledriver performed from the ring's corner, this technique was used to cripple Daisuke. As The Third his ultimate technique is called Sacrifice where he lifts his opponent from the legs and then jumps and subsequently slams their back into the mat while putting pressure on the legs, immobilizing them and causing severe damage to the entire body, which can potentially cripple its target. He is modeled after the famous American wrestler Lou Thesz. He is voiced by Bin Shimada.

=== Kevin Anderson ===
Kevin Anderson (ケビン・アンダーソン, Kebin Andāson) is a GWM wrestler who was trained in the Tiger's Den and is currently working for Miss X. He is a close friend of Takuma/Tiger the Dark having enrolled as a trainee at the same time yet ultimately grows apart the more he becomes indoctrinated into the ways of Tiger's Den. In the tournament, he assumes the ring name of Wagner (ワーグナー, Wāgunā), and has also gone under the identity of masked wrestler Miracle 2 (ミラクル2, Mirakuru 2). After the defeat of Tiger's Den, he is now destitute and lives in shame having destroyed his friendship with Takuma. His mother is the only relative cited. He is voiced by Jun Fukuyama.

=== Odin ===
Henry Odin (ヘンリー・オーディン, Henrī Ōdein) is a wrestler represented by Tiger's Den. He joins Yellow Devil and the GWM in their matches in Japan, and is one of the first opponents Tiger Mask has to fight along that group. He fell from grace from his first defeat against Tiger Mask and was punished to the Tiger's Execution, becoming a living punching bag for other trainees. He undertakes the lethal Hell in the Hole match, and becomes one of its three survivors. However, he is injured in the process and retires from GWM before returning to his hometown in America where his girlfriend Catherine awaits him. He's later seen near the end of the series fighting alongside Takuma as his tag-partner in North America. He is modeled after Gene Simmons and Dirty Baron of Kinnikuman. He is voiced by Eiji Takemoto.

=== Mike Rodriguez ===
Mike Rodriguez (マイク・ロドリゲス, Maiku Rodorigesu) is a GWM hometown wrestler. He joins Takuma and Kevin Anderson to Japan as part of GWM's business expansion. He is voiced by Yasuaki Takumi.

=== Red Death Mask ===
Red Death Mask (レッドデスマスク, Reddo Desu Masuku) is an assassin sent by Tiger's Den. His costume is all in red. His specialty is his strong grip which is called the "Red Death Claw". He is the fifth to die during the Hell-in-the-hole tournament.^{Ep. 20} He is voiced by Hiroaki Miura. To promote the anime, the real-life NJPW also introduced a real-life Red Death Mask, with Juice Robinson behind the mask, and became the debut opponent for the real-life Tiger Mask W.

=== Black Python ===
Black Python (ブラック・パイソン, Burakku Paison) is a GWM wrestler associated with Tiger's Den. He is a skilled veteran from Great Britain. He is the first to lose his life during the Hell-in-the-hole tournament.^{Ep. 19} He is voiced by Masaya Takatsuka.

=== Bosman ===
Bosman (ボスマン, Bosuman) is a pro-wrestler from GWM and Tiger's Den. He wears a brown outfit with an eye in the middle, and has a few strands of hair on his head and a beard. He is jealous of Tiger the Dark's ability and success. He is voiced by Kenji Hamada. He bears a resemblance to real life Canadian professional wrestler Michael Elgin.

=== Bull and Dog ===
Bull (ブル, Buru) and Dog (ドッグ, Doggu) are a pair of pro wrestlers associated with GWM but not with Tiger's Den. Bull has short brown hair and wears blue tights. Dog has blond hair and wears red tights. Dog dislikes Tiger the Dark of Junior. They are voiced by Junya Enoki and Kōta Nemoto respectively.

=== Queen Elizabeth ===
Queen Elizabeth (クイーン・エリザベス, Kuīn Erizabesu) is a female pro-wrestler from GWM. She has long blond hair and blue eyes, and wears a blue bikini wrestling outfit. She participates with the GWM Divas. She bears a resemblance to WWE's wrestler Charlotte Flair, of which Queen is one of the latter's nicknames. She is voiced by Ai Maeda.

=== Payne Fox ===
Payne Fox (ペイン・フォックス, Pein Fokkusu) is a female pro-wrestler from GWM. She has short red hair, wears face paint, and is petite. She bears a striking resemblance to WWE's wrestler Becky Lynch. She is voiced by Ai Nagano.

=== Billy the Kidman ===
Billy the Kidman (ビリー・ザ・キッドマン, Birī za Kiddoman) is a pro-wrestler from GWM. Under orders from GWM he took on the identity of the Yellow Devil to participate in the Masked World Tournament. He and Odin want to crush the Zipang Pro Wrestling group. He was defeated by Tiger Mask's perfected Tiger Drive and unmasked. His specialty is on his diamond-hard head which can crack walls. He is named after and resembles former WCW and WWF/E wrestler Billy Kidman. He is the last to lose his life during the Hell-in-the-hole tournament. He is voiced by Hiroki Yasumoto.

=== Bigfoot ===
Bigfoot (ビッグフット, Biggufutto) is an American wrestler from GWM that is associated with Tiger's Den. He is incredibly large yet swift. He also enjoys sleeping. His specialty is on his bearhug which can split a tree. He bears a resemblance to WWE wrestler Big Show. He is voiced by Kōhei Fukuhara.

=== Milk and Mint ===
Milk (ミルク, Miruku) and Mint (ミント, Minto) are two Japanese female pro-wrestlers from GWM. Together they are known as the Candy Pair (キャンディペア, Kyandi Pea). They are 20-year-old. Milk has medium-length black hair styled in a ponytail and is pictured in a white and pink top and frilled miniskirt. She looks like a Japanese idol. Mint has brown hair and wears a yellow-and-green outfit. According to character designer Hisashi Kagawa, they are modeled after Japanese female pro-wrestlers Mizuki and Saki. They are voiced by Mayumi Iizuka and Haruna Ikezawa.

=== King Tiger ===
King Tiger (キング・タイガー, Kingu Taigā) is a GWM master of martial arts and one of Tiger's Den Four Heavenly Kings, or Four Tigers. A vicious and extremely powerful wrestler, he fought Tiger Mask under a match with special rules and dominated most of the fight, beating Naoto one-sidedly several times. His specialty is on his kicks which are extremely fast and powerful, and his strongest technique is a high jump kick called Hammer of King. It is unknown if he is related to the one from the original anime who lost his life during a fight with Naoto Date. He is modeled after the martial master The Monsterman. He is voiced by Tamotsu Nishiwaki.

=== Miracle 1 ===
Miracle 1 (ミラクル1, Mirakuru 1) is a Canadian pro-wrestler from GWM from three years, and the former CSW world heavyweight champion from one month. He is described as a high flyer and mysterious. Although initially amicable while joining the NJPW, this is a ruse as Miracle 1 is an hostile, dirty fighter who has no qualms to resort to fouls and cheating to win. In fact his preferred method of fighting involves ganging up on wrestlers along with the other Miracles. He's subsequently defeated by Okada's Rainmaker.

His killer move is called Miracle Rana which is a diving hurricanrana performed from the corner in combination with one of the other Miracles. He is voiced by Hiroaki Miura.

=== Miracle 3 ===
O'Conner (オコナー, Okonā) / Miracle 3 (ミラクル3, Mirakuru 3) is a coach of the Tiger's Den in charge for the GWM. He has no killer move and instead fights purely through orthodox moves, all of whom have been honed to a great level. Although he studied Tiger Mask's fighting style, he was defeated when Tiger Mask used improvised moves. He is voiced by Taketora.

=== Universal Mask ===
Universal Mask (ユニバーサル・マスク, Yunibāsaru Masuku) originally went to NJPW under the moniker Miracle 4 (ミラクル4, Mirakuru 4). He specializes in aerial maneuvers. He is voiced by Masaya Takatsuka.

=== Big Tiger the Second ===
Big Tiger the Second (ビッグタイガー・ザ・セカンド, Biggu Taigā za Sekando), more commonly known as The Second (ザ・セカンド, Za Sekando), is a pro-wrestler from the Tiger's Den and one of its Four Heavenly Kings, or Four Tigers, and a former American champion. He is the son of Big Tiger, one of the original Tiger Mask's enemies. Contrary to both his name and his father, he has a relatively small size at 175 cm. He's however strong enough to spar against The Third in equal conditions. He has great muscle mass which makes him resistant to attacks, however due to being a veteran fighter his stamina is limited. He is defeated by a combination of Tiger the Dark's Crossbow along with Tiger Mask's German suplex. His killer move is called "Skewer" where he lifts his opponent from the arms while putting their back on his head, he then performs a high jump and slams the opponent on the floor causing tremendous damage. He is voiced by Unshō Ishizuka.

=== Tiger the Black ===
Tiger the Black (タイガー・ザ・ブラック, Taigā za Burakku) is a pro-wrestler from the Tiger's Den and one of its Four Heavenly Kings, or Four Tigers. He is a massive dark-skinned wrestler heighting 195 cm with a large body and soft muscles that can absorb the shock of attacks. He uses his weight to his advantage by performing powerful body attacks. Contrary to his size his joints are flexible and he's very swift. His killer technique is called "Black Crush" where he jumps over his opponent with great power. He is defeated by Makabe while attempting to jump on him, only for Makabe to knock him off balance and hitting his head, incapacitating him. It is unknown if he is related in some way to the one from the original anime who fought against Naoto Date. He is voiced by Nobuyuki Hiyama.

== Secondary characters ==
=== Keiji Tanaka / Fukuwara Mask ===
Keiji Tanaka (ケイジ田中, Keiji Tanaka) / Fukuwara Mask (ふくわらマスク, Fukuwara Masuku) was a Japanese professional wrestler from GWM three years ago. Now is a pro-wrestler for New Japan Pro-Wrestling. He dresses with a Hyottoko mask and street clothes and provides comic relief to the shows. Contrary to his buffoonery however, he's in fact a fairly competent fighter who can give even Tiger Mask a tough fight if he ever decides to fight seriously. He sometimes provides commentary and shows to have extensive knowledge of wrestling techniques and is able to provide accurate information. He is revealed to be the former coach of The Third and an unrevealed number of wrestlers from the Tiger's Den, with both Fukuwara Mask and The Third discovering each other's identity during their encounter in the War Games. He left the Tiger's Den as he became disgusted with their workings, being happier with his present path. He is modeled after the American wrestler Great Togo. His gimmick is in the style of clown wrestlers from Osaka Pro Wrestling like Ebessan, Kikutaro and Kuishinbo Kamen. He is voiced by Kōzō Shioya.

=== Gorilla Jeet Singh ===
Gorilla Jeet Singh (ゴリラージェットシン, Gorirā Jetto Shin) is a wrestler who is dressed like a pirate with a turban on his head. He carries a big half-moon-shaped sword. He tends to go on rampages that terrify the audience.

=== Mister Question ===
Mister Question (ミスター・クエスチョン, Misutā Kuesuchon) is an Indian professional wrestler. He encourages the current Tiger Mask to be stronger as he also opposes the GWM. His specialty is on his contortions that make him immune to submission techniques. When he was ten-year-old, he saw his master, the first Mister Question, fighting against the original Tiger Mask in New Delhi.^{Ch. 10} He is voiced by Tomomichi Nishimura.

=== Kaioh Mikasa ===
Kaioh Mikasa (三笠海王, Mikasa Kaiō) was Zipang Wrestling's number two wrestler. When Daisuke Fujii got injured, he left Zipang and became a freelance wrestler. During the unlocked world tournament, he uses the ring name Poseidon (ポセイドン) He is voiced by Yasuhiko Kawazu.

=== The Saboten ===
The Saboten (ザ・サボテン, Za Saboten) is a Mexican wrestler who wears a lucha libre-styled mask. He enjoys Japanese pro wrestling and beef bowls. He is managed by his mother, who goes by Mammy. He is later seen near the end of the series fighting alongside Naoto as his tag-match partner. He is voiced by Mitsuo Iwata.

=== Mammy ===
Mammy (マミー, Mamī) is The Saboten's mother and a Mexican pro wrestling promoter. She desires to have Tiger Mask transfer over and join her federation in Mexico, as many have moved onto GWM. Following the Tiger's Den defeat and subsequent fall, she becomes Naoto's new manager when he transfers over to Mexico and officially joins her federation. She is voiced by Mami Horikoshi.

=== Evance ===
Evance (エヴァンス, Evu~ansu) is a millionaire who watches the Hell-in-the-hole wrestling event. He is voiced by Ikuya Sawaki.

=== Gotoku Arashi ===
Gotoku Arashi (嵐高徳, Arashi Gōtoku), real name Osamu Umano (馬野オサム, Umano Osamu), is a martial arts master from Arashiyama, Kyoto. His character design is the same Toranosuke Arashi's. He is voiced by Tomohisa Asou.

=== Issei Handa ===
Issei Handa (半田一誠, Handa Issei) is also a martial arts master from Arashiyama, Kyoto, as with Gotoku Arashi. He is voiced by Mitsuaki Madono.

=== Mother Devil ===
Mother Devil (マザーデビル, Mazā Debiru) is a female pro-wrestler from Golden Women's Pro-Wrestling. She has a massive stature and corpulent physique, and fights using brutal strength to overpower her opponents. Although she puts Haruna through a one-sided beating, she is defeated by a combination of her hip strike and kicks on her head. Her killer move is the Devil Mother Chop, a swift yet powerful cross chop. She is voiced by Yuka Komatsu.

== Other characters ==
- Kimihiko Ozaki (尾崎仁彦, Ozaki Kimihiko) is the ring announcer in NJPW. He is based on the real-life ring announcer of the same name. He is voiced by Kenta Tanaka.
- Ricardo Gonzàlez (リカルド・ゴンザレス, Rikarudo Gonzaresu) is a pro-wrestler from the Tiger's Den who held a deep grudge against Takuma. He is the fourth to lose his life during the Hell in the Hole tournament. He is voiced by Keisuke Baba.^{Ep. 1, 18, 19}
- Blackout (ブラック・アウト, Burakku auto) is a robot from the Tiger's Den who is 2.50 meters tall. He is the gatekeeper of the Hell in the Hole match as the final challenger. He resembles the WWE wrestler The Undertaker.^{Ep. 20}
- Viper Takagi (バイパー高城, Baipā Takagi) is a Japanese female pro-wrestler. She is modeled after the Japanese pro-wrestler Emi Sakura. She is voiced by Reimi.
- A pair of masked wrestlers called The Metal Brothers resemble the WWE tag team Road Warriors.
- Many real-life wrestlers make background appearances in the crowd: Aasa Maika^{Ep. 27} Yujiro Kushida, Harashima, Moeka Haruhi, Toru Owashi, Kaori Yoneyama, Satoshi Kojima, Hiroyoshi Tenzan, Toshiaki Komura, and Hisashi Kagawa^{Ep. 37}
- Other real-life characters: Liger (ライガー, Raigā); Captain (キャプテン, Kyaputen); Bushi; Nama Ham (生ハム, Nama Hamu) and Yaki Udon (焼うどん, Yaki Udon) (voiced by Marina Nishii and Risa Azuma).^{Ep. 6}
- Other fictional pro-wrestlers: Bobby Newton (ボビー・ニュートン, Bobī Nyūton) (voiced by Kenji Akabane); Mexican El Caracas (エル・カラカス, Eru Karakasu) (voiced by Shunsuke Kanie)^{Ep. 21}; Phantom (ファントム, Fantomu) (voiced by Keiji Hirai) and Cox (コックス, Kokkusu)^{Ep. 19}; Mister No (ミスター・ノー, Misutā Nō).^{Ep. 38}
- Other fictional characters: Rikuna (琉那, Rikuna) (voiced by Shino Shimoji)^{Ep. 7}, Catherine (キャスリン, Kyasurin) (voiced by Ryoko Shiraishi)^{Ep. 19, 20}, and Miki.^{Ep. 22, 23}
- Japanese pro-wrestlers for Zipang Pro-Wrestling three years ago: Daimon (大門, Daimon), Tsuyoshi Nishida (西田ツヨシ, Nishida Tsuyoshi) (voiced by Kazumasa Fukagawa), and Sho Daimaru (大丸ショウ, Daimaru Shō) (voiced by Kōta Nemoto).^{Ep. 3}
- Other fictional Japanese pro-wrestlers: Dynamite Kagawa (ダイナマイト賀川, Dainamaito Kagawa), Jumbo Hayama (ジャンボ葉山, Janbo Hayama), and Hiroshi Asahara (朝原寛, Asahara Hiroshi)^{Ep. 5}; Alec Meyer (アレク・マイヤー, Areku Maiyā) (voiced by Atsushi Kisaichi); Unagi Mask (うなぎマスク, Unagi Masuku) (voiced by Kazumasa Fukagawa).^{Ep. 22}
- Many characters from the original Tiger Mask anime series make appearances in form of background footage, flashbacks or pictures in programs or newspapers. Naoto Date is shown in multiple episodes^{Ep. 7, 10, 15, 33}, as well as Tiger the Great.^{Ep. 7, 13, 25, 33} The seventh episode shows Mister X, Kenta, Gaboten, Yoshio Sasaki, Yoko Takaoka, The Lion Man, The Egypt Mummy, The Golden Mask, The Dracula, Mister No, the first Mister Question, Mister Kamikaze, and Star Apollon. Other characters include Ursus Apollon^{Ep. 10}, Gorilla Man^{Ep. 15}, Daigo Daimon, Big Tiger, and Black Tiger.^{Ep. 33}

== Works cited ==
- "Ep." is shortened form for episode and refers to an episode number of this anime.
