= List of Tiger Mask W episodes =

Tiger Mask W (Japanese: タイガーマスクW(ダブル); Taigā Masuku Daburu) is a Tiger Mask anime series which premiered on October 1, 2016, with 38 episodes.

The opening theme is "Ike! Tiger Mask" ( 行け!タイガーマスク; Go! Tiger Mask) by Shonan no Kaze and the ending theme is "KING OF THE WILD" also by Shonan no Kaze. The opening theme is a new rendition of the opening in the original Tiger Mask, which was originally performed by Hideyo Morimoto. The show airs on TV Asahi's 26:45 (2:45 AM) time slot on Saturday, technically Sunday morning.

== Episode list ==
No.	Title (Note: English episode titles are taken from Crunchyroll.) Japanese title	Director (Storyboard)	Screenplay	Original release date	Ref.
1	"The Two Tigers"; Transliteration: "Ni-tō no tora" (Japanese: 二頭の虎)	Toshiaki Komura	Katsuhiko Chiba	October 2, 2016	
2	"Tiger and Lion"; Transliteration: "Tora to raion" (Japanese: 虎とライオン)	Hiroyuki Hironori	Katsuhiko Chiba	October 9, 2016	
3	"The Tiger's Legacy"; Transliteration: "Tora no isan" (Japanese: 虎の遺産)	Hiroki Shibata	Katsuhiko Chiba	October 16, 2016	
4	"The Mask of Red Death"; Transliteration: "Akakishinokamen" (Japanese: 赤き死の仮面)	Yu Kamatani	Shonji Yonemura	October 23, 2016	
5	"The Mystery of Fukuwara Mask"; Transliteration: "Fukuwara masuku no nazo" (Japanese: ふくわらマスクの謎)	Yasutoku Goto (Hiroyuki Sumi)	Masaharu Amiya	October 30, 2016	
6	"Idol vs. Heel"; Transliteration: "Aidoru × hīru" (Japanese: アイドル×ヒール)	Katsuda Kachida	Yoshio Urasawa	November 6, 2016	
7	"Naoto and Naoto"; Transliteration: "Naoto to Naoto" (Japanese: 直人とナオト)	Hiroyuki Hironori	Masaharu Amiya	November 13, 2016	
8	"Tiger's Den Bares Fangs"; Transliteration: "Kiba o muku doranoana" (Japanese: 牙を剥く虎の穴)	Hiroki Shibata	Katsuhiko Chiba	November 27, 2016	
9	"The Stormy Opening Match"; Transliteration: "Haran no kaimaku-sen" (Japanese: 波乱の開幕戦)	Kimitoshi Mioka	Katsuhiko Chiba	December 4, 2016	
10	"The Mysterious Mister Question"; Transliteration: "Nazo no misutā?" (Japanese: 謎のミスター？)	Makoto Sonoda	Tsuyoshi Tamai	December 11, 2016	
11	"The Tiger's Killer Move"; Transliteration: "Tora no hissawwaza" (Japanese: 虎の必殺技)	Hiroyuki Hironori	Shonji Yonemura	December 18, 2016	
12	"Tiger vs. Tiger"; Transliteration: "Taigā × taigā" (Japanese: タイガー×タイガー)	Yasunori Goto, Masayoshi Nishida	Katsuhiko Chiba	December 25, 2016	
13	"A False Victory"; Transliteration: "Kyokō no shōri" (Japanese: 虚構の勝利)	Yu Kamatani	Masaharu Amiya	January 8, 2017	
14	"Crossroads"; Transliteration: "Kurosurōdo" (Japanese: クロスロード)	Akio Yamaguchi	Katsuhiko Chiba	January 15, 2017	
15	"Fierce Fight — Bigfoot Match"; Transliteration: "Gekitō! Biggufutto-sen!" (Japanese: 激闘！ビッグフット戦！)	Hiroki Shibata	Shonji Yonemura	January 22, 2017	
16	"A Capable Promoter"; Transliteration: "Yūshūna puromōtā" (Japanese: 優秀なプロモーター)	Kimitoshi Mioka, Yasutoku Goto	Yoshio Urasawa	January 29, 2017	
17	"Don't Be a Softy"; Transliteration: "Amattarenja nē!" (Japanese: 甘ったれんじゃねえ！)	Hiroyuki Hironori	Tsuyoshi Tamai	February 5, 2017	
18	"Spring Tiger is Born"; Transliteration: "Tanjō! Supuringutaigā" (Japanese: 誕生！スプリングタイガー)	Masayoshi Nishida, Hideki Hiroshima	Masaharu Amiya	February 12, 2017	
19	"The Escape from Hell"; Transliteration: "Jigoku kara no dasshutsu" (Japanese: 地獄からの脱出)	Makoto Sonoda	Katsuhiko Chiba	February 19, 2017	
20	"The Gatekeeper of Hell"; Transliteration: "Jigoku no monban" (Japanese: 地獄の門番)	Hiroyuki Hironori	Katsuhiko Chiba	February 26, 2017	
21	"Reunion"; Transliteration: "Saikai!" (Japanese: 再会！)	Masayuku Saogo, Masayoshi Nishida	Shonji Yonemura	March 5, 2017	
22	"Fukuwara Mask's Ambition"; Transliteration: "Fukuwara masuku no yabō!" (Japanese: ふくわらマスクの野望！)	Hiroyuki Sumi, Yasunori Goto	Tsuyoshi Tamai	March 12, 2017	
23	"War Games Open"; Transliteration: "U~ōgēmu kaimaku!" (Japanese: ウォーゲーム開幕！)	Hiroki Shibata	Masaharu Amiya	March 19, 2017	
24	"The Fierce Tigers Clash Again"; Transliteration: "Futatabi no mōko gekitotsu" (Japanese: 再びの猛虎激突！)	Yu Kamatani	Shonji Yonemura	March 26, 2017	
25	"The Tiger's Identity"; Transliteration: "Tora no shōtai" (Japanese: 虎の正体)	Hiroyuki Hironori	Katsuhiko Chiba	April 2, 2017	
26	"The Mysterious Miracle 1"; Transliteration: "Nazo no mirakuru 1" (Japanese: 謎のミラクル1)	Masayoshi Nishida, Hideki Hiroshima	Katsuhiko Chiba	April 9, 2017	
27	"A Deadly Match against King Tiger"; Transliteration: "Shitō! Kingutaigā-sen" (Japanese: 死闘！キングタイガー戦)	Morio Hatano	Shonji Yonemura	April 16, 2017	
28	"The Yellow Demon"; Transliteration: "Kiiroi akuma" (Japanese: 黄色い悪魔)	Musashi Nakano	Katsuhiko Chiba	April 23, 2017	
29	"The Solitary Tiger"; Transliteration: "Kodoku no tora" (Japanese: 孤独の虎)	Makoto Sonoda	Masaharu Amiya	April 30, 2017	
30	"The Tiger's Sanction"; Transliteration: "Tora no seisai!" (Japanese: 虎の制裁！)	Hiroyuki Hironori	Tsuyoshi Tamai	May 7, 2017	
31	"Showdown with The Arashi Juken Style"; Transliteration: "Taiketsu! Arashi yawara ken-ryū" (Japanese: 対決！嵐柔剣流)	Masayoshi Nishida, Hiroki Shibata	Shonji Yonemura	May 14, 2017	
32	"Lumberjack"; Transliteration: "Ranbājakku" (Japanese: ランバージャック)	Yu Kamatani, Tetsuya Yanagisawa	Katsuhiko Chiba	May 21, 2017	
33	"Assassin from The Past"; Transliteration: "Kako kara no shikaku" (Japanese: 過去からの刺客)	Hiroyuki Hironori	Shonji Yonemura	May 28, 2017	
34	"Grand Melee"; Transliteration: "Dai konsen" (Japanese: 大混戦)	Hiroki Shibata	Katsuhiko Chiba	June 4, 2017	
35	"Tiger Fangs Strike"; Transliteration: "Sakuretsu! Tora no kiba!" (Japanese: 炸裂！虎の牙！)	Unknown	Unknown	June 11, 2017	
36	"Four Tigers"; Transliteration: "Shi-tō no tora" (Japanese: 四頭の虎)	Unknown	Unknown	June 18, 2017	
37	"Farewell Tiger"; Transliteration: "Saraba tora yo" (Japanese: さらば虎よ)	Unknown	Unknown	June 25, 2017	
38	"Masked Tiger Springer"; Transliteration: "Kamen taigā supuringā" (Japanese: 仮面タイガー スプリンガー)	Yu Kamatani	Unknown	July 2, 2017	
