= ACH (wrestler) =

American professional wrestler

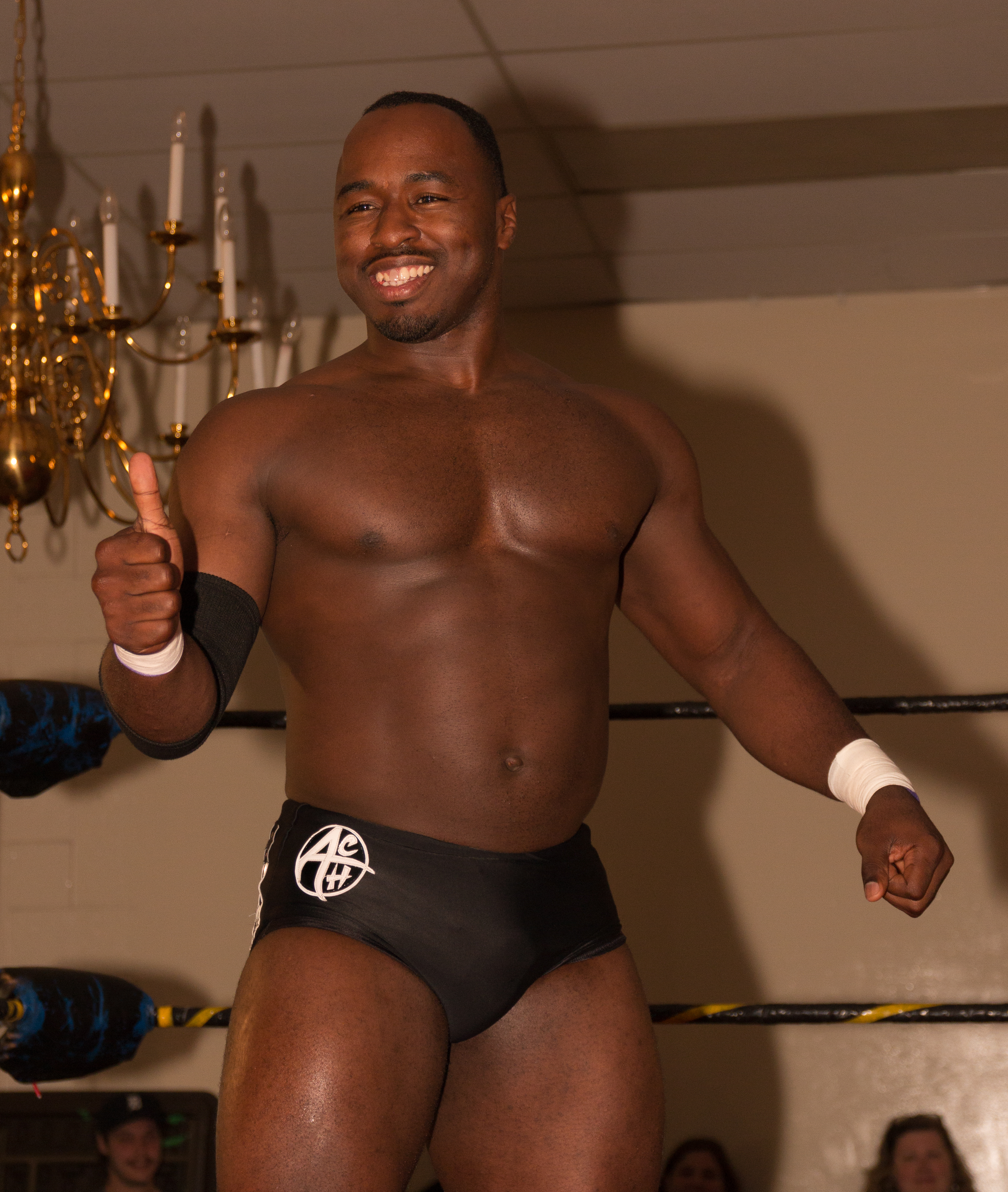
- ACH in 2017

Personal information
- Born: Albert C. Hardie Jr. December 7, 1987 (age 38) San Antonio, Texas, U.S.

Professional wrestling career
- Ring name(s): ACH; AC Leroy; Albert Hardie Jr. Jordan Myles; Tiger the Dark
- Billed height: 5 ft 9 in (175 cm)
- Billed weight: 210 lb (95 kg)
- Billed from: Planet Vegeta by way of Austin, Texas, United States
- Trained by: Norman Smiley (WWE Performance Center)
- Debut: February 2007

Albert C. Hardie Jr. (born December 7, 1987) is an American professional wrestler, currently known by his ring name ACH.

He has wrestled for several American promotions, like Ring of Honor Wrestling (ROH), AAW: Professional Wrestling Redefined (AAW), Chikara, Combat Zone Wrestling (CZW), Dragon Gate USA (DGUSA), Impact Wrestling, Major League Wrestling (MLW) and Pro Wrestling Guerrilla (PWG). He has also performed in Japan for Pro Wrestling Noah and New Japan Pro-Wrestling (NJPW), where he used the character of Tiger the Dark, based on the TV Series Tiger Mask W. He also worked for WWE in the NXT brand under the ring name Jordan Myles.

== Early life ==
Hardie's parents divorced when he was a child and he spent time between the two households, living a "sheltered" life and developing his imagination by reading comic books and watching cartoons. Hardie's father is a San Antonio DJ. He has two sisters, who are both around ten years older than him. At the age of ten, Hardie first saw professional wrestling, when he was invited to a friend's house, where World Championship Wrestling (WCW) was on the television. Hardie was immediately fascinated by professional wrestling, particularly the high-flying luchadores. During high school, he decided to pursue a career in professional wrestling.

== Professional wrestling career ==
=== Independent circuit (2007–2019) ===
Hardie was trained by Jerry Reyes and Scot Summers and made his professional wrestling debut in February 2007. After two years of working for small promotions on the independent circuit under the ring name ACH, Hardie began considering retiring from professional wrestling, before getting an offer to work for Anarchy Championship Wrestling (ACW), based in his hometown of Austin, Texas.

ACH made his debut for Anarchy Championship Wrestling on August 23, 2009, starting a storyline rivalry with Robert Evans. He won his first title in the promotion on August 22, 2010, when he defeated Evans for the ACW U-30 Young Gun Championship. He lost the title to Akira Tozawa on May 15, 2011. On November 12, ACH first defeated Bolt Brady and Colt Cabana in the first round, then Gary Jay in the semifinals and finally JT LaMotta in the finals to win the 2011 Lone Star Classic and become the ACW Heavyweight Champion. ACH held the title until July 22, 2012, when he was defeated by Jaykus Plisken. On June 10, 2011, ACH defeated Bolt Brady to win the NWA Lone Star Junior Heavyweight Championship. However, just a month later he was stripped of the title. On April 14, 2012, ACH made his debut for Combat Zone Wrestling (CZW), entering the Best of the Best 11 tournament and losing to A. R. Fox in a three-way first round match, which also included Lince Dorado. On June 2, ACH defeated Dan Walsh and Neil Diamond Cutter in the finals of an eight-man tournament held by Metro Pro Wrestling (MPW) to become the new NWA Central States Heavyweight Champion. He was stripped of the title on November 1, when MPW withdrew from the National Wrestling Alliance (NWA), however, the promotion recognized him as the first MPW Central States Champion. On November 2, ACH made his debut for Dragon Gate USA, teaming with Cima and Rich Swann in a six-man captain's fall tag team match, where they defeated the Gentleman's Club (Chuck Taylor, Drew Gulak and Orange Cassidy).

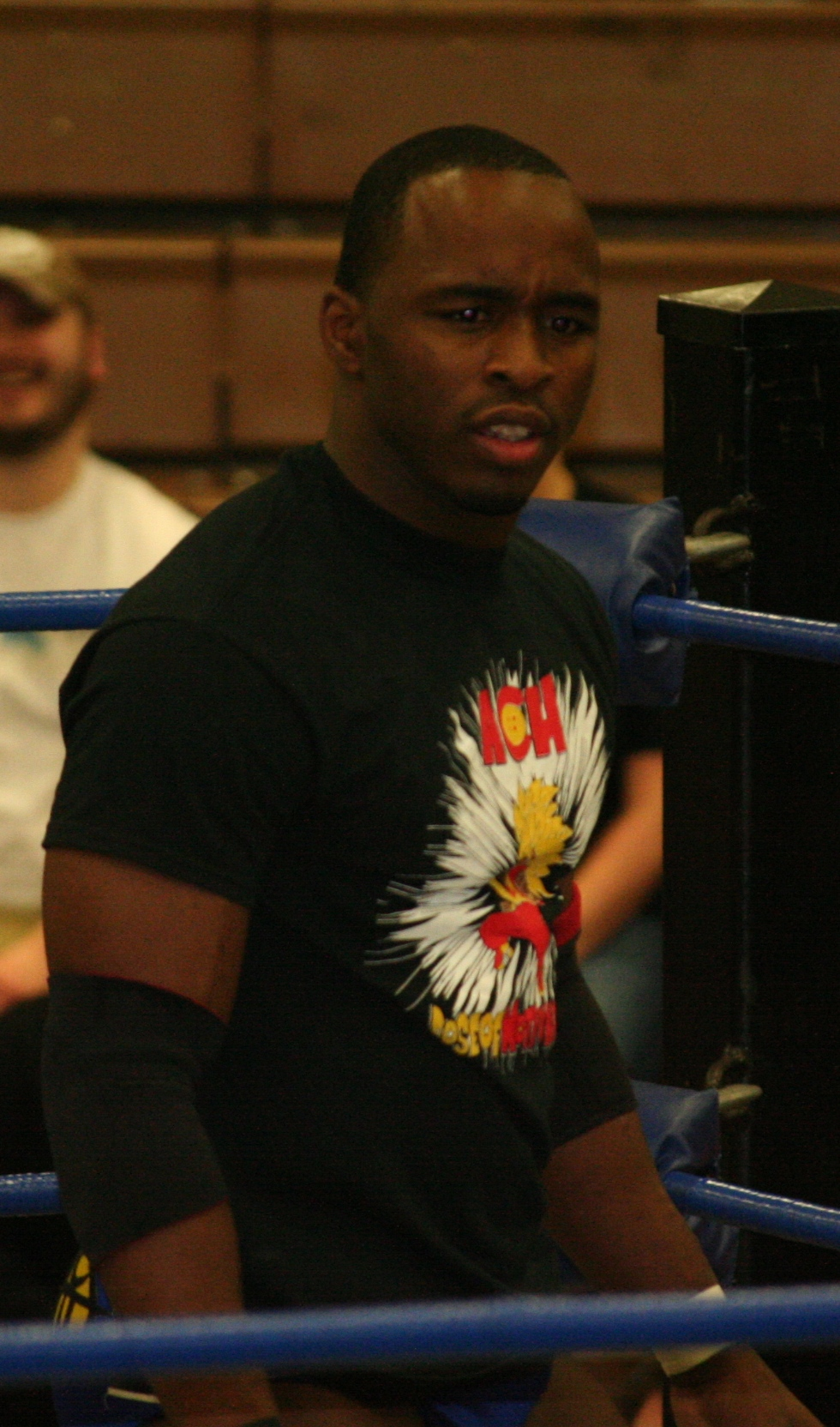
ACH during the National Pro Wrestling Day.

On July 29, 2012, ACH made his debut for the Chikara promotion, entering the Young Lions Cup X tournament and defeating Aaron Epic, J. T. Dunn and Vinny Marseglia in his first round four-way match. He followed that up by defeating Jakob Hammermeier in the semifinals on August 17. The finals of the tournament took place the following day and saw ACH lose to Mark Angelosetti. ACH returned to the promotion on December 2 at the Under the Hood pay-per-view, where he unsuccessfully challenged Angelosetti for the Young Lions Cup.

On January 25, 2013, ACH entered Berwyn, Illinois based AAW: Professional Wrestling Redefined's Heritage Championship tournament, defeating Prince Mustafa Ali, Mat Fitchett and Juntai Miller to advance to the tournament finals, where he defeated Samuray del Sol in the finals to win the tournament and become the new AAW Heritage Champion. On February 2, 2013, ACH took part in the National Pro Wrestling Day in Philadelphia, Pennsylvania, entering the Rey de Voladores tournament. After defeating Bolt Brady, Lukas Sharp and Mitch Thompson in his first round match during the afternoon show, ACH was defeated in the finals of the tournament by 2 Cold Scorpio during the evening show. On August 30, ACH made his debut for Pro Wrestling Guerrilla (PWG), when he entered the 2013 Battle of Los Angeles and defeated Anthony Nese in his first round match. The following day, ACH was eliminated from the tournament in the second round by eventual tournament winner Kyle O'Reilly. In March 2014, it was reported that ACH would be taking part in a WWE tryout camp later in the month. He took part in the same camp as Kevin Steen and Roderick Strong. At the conclusion of the camp, he was not offered a contract.

On December 30, 2016, ACH defeated AR Fox to win the AAW Heritage Championship for the second time.

On January 27, 2017, ACH made his debut for Evolve, losing to Matt Riddle. In August 2017, ACH returned to Evolve as one half of the tag team The Troll Boyz with Ethan Page. The two won the Evolve Tag Team Championship on September 22.

ACH substituted for an injured Flip Gordon at PWG's Hand of Doom in January 2019. ACH wrestled in a losing effort against Bandido. It was his first appearance for PWG since Mystery Vortex IV on December 16, 2016, and also his last appearance for PWG due to his WWE signing.

=== Ring of Honor (2012–2016) ===
On September 15, 2012, ACH made his debut for Ring of Honor (ROH), facing Kyle O'Reilly in a losing effort at the Death Before Dishonor X: State of Emergency internet pay-per-view. He returned to the promotion on January 5, 2013, losing to Matt Taven in the first round of the Top Prospect Tournament. On February 21, ROH announced that the promotion had signed ACH to a long-term contract. This was followed by ACH picking up his first win in ROH on March 2 at the 11th Anniversary Show, where he defeated Adam Page, Mike Sydal, Q.T. Marshall, Silas Young and TaDarius Thomas in a six-way match. Afterwards, ACH began teaming regularly with TaDarius Thomas, with the two forming a tag team named Adrenaline Rush and also having one six mix person tag team match with Athena Reese as their partner but with the tag team stable consisted of ACH and TaDarius only. On July 27, ACH entered a tournament to determine the new ROH World Champion, but was eliminated in his first round match by Karl Anderson. On February 8, 2014, Adrenaline Rush earned a future shot at the ROH World Tag Team Championship by defeating the reigning champions, reDRagon (Bobby Fish and Kyle O'Reilly), in a non-title Proving Ground match. Adrenaline Rush received their title shot on February 21 at the 12th Anniversary Show, but were defeated by reDRagon. Adrenaline Rush broke up two months later with TaDarius Thomas joining The Decade.

On June 6, 2014, ACH received his first shot at the ROH World Championship, after winning a six-way match, but was defeated by the defending champion, Adam Cole. On June 22 at Best in the World 2014, ACH won another six-way match to earn a shot at the ROH World Television Championship. ACH received his title shot at the August 9 Ring of Honor Wrestling tapings, but his match with Jay Lethal ended in a thirty-minute time limit draw. On November 15 at Glory By Honor XIII, ACH received a shot at the ROH World Championship in his home state of Texas, but was defeated by Jay Briscoe. On March 12, 2016, ACH unsuccessfully challenged New Japan Pro-Wrestling (NJPW) representative Kushida for the IWGP Junior Heavyweight Championship. On October 8, ACH made comments at an AAW event talking about his "wife" who did not appreciate him and about how he was planning on getting a divorce. The comments were interpreted as ACH talking about his situation with ROH. On November 1, Pro Wrestling Insider reported that it had confirmed from multiple sources that ACH was finishing up with ROH. On November 8, it was reported that ACH had started taking independent bookings, seemingly indicating his departure from ROH.

=== Mexico (2015) ===
On May 24, 2015, ACH made his debut for Lucha Libre AAA World Wide (AAA), when he formed a trio with Brian Cage and Moose for the Lucha Libre World Cup in Mexico City. After defeating Team AAA (El Hijo del Fantasma, Psycho Clown and El Texano Jr.) in their opening match, they were defeated in the semifinals by the Dream Team (Myzteziz, El Patrón Alberto and Rey Mysterio Jr.). They later claimed third place in the tournament over Team MexLeyendas (Blue Demon Jr., Dr. Wagner Jr. and El Solar).

=== Impact Wrestling (2017) ===
During the Impact Wrestling tapings on July 3, 2017, ACH was announced as a participant in the 2017 Super X Cup, representing AAW. Later in the tapings, he defeated Andrew Everett in his first round match. Three days later, he was eliminated from the tournament in the semifinals by Taiji Ishimori.

=== Japan (2016–2018) ===
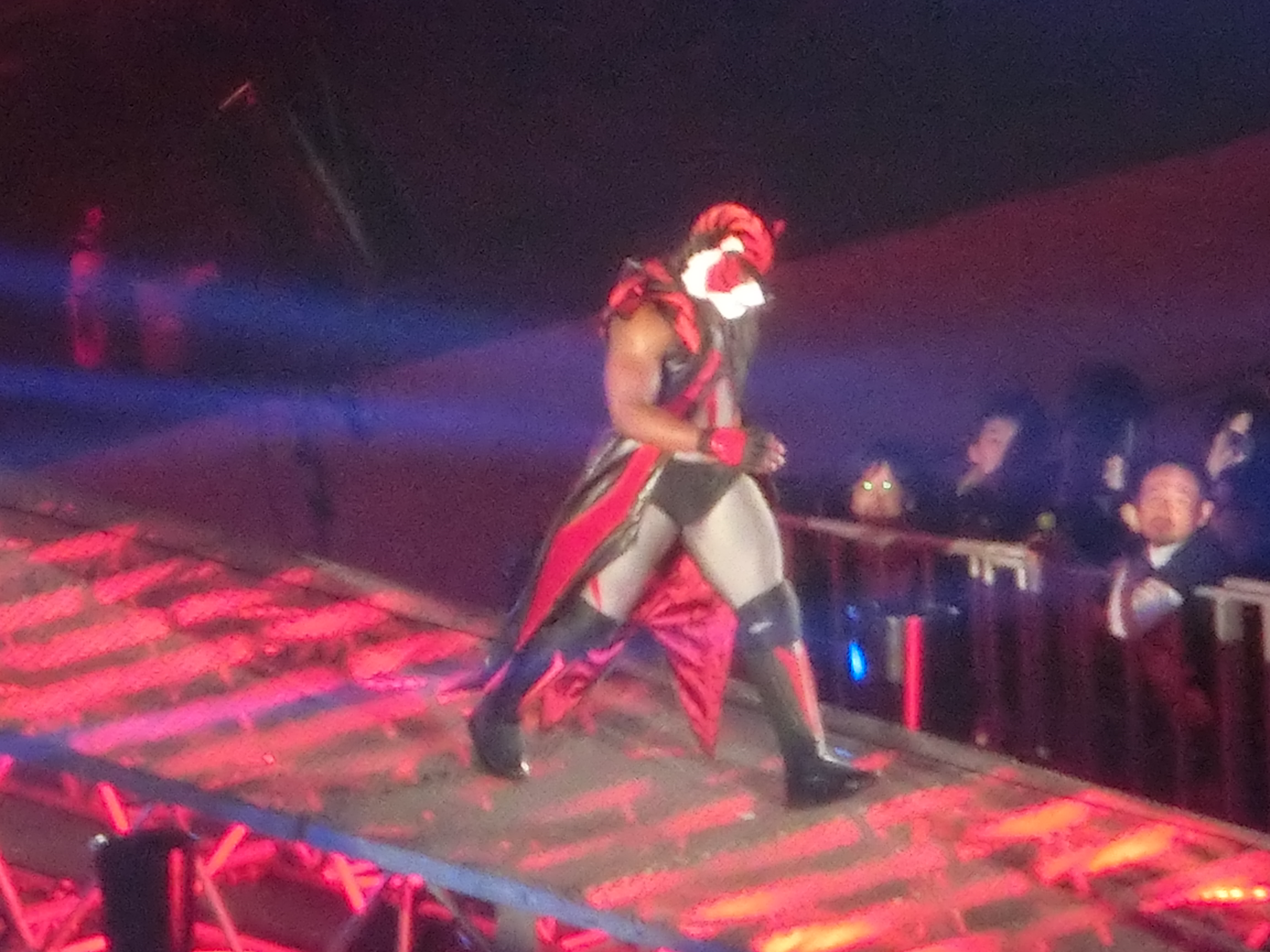
ACH as Tiger the Dark in January 2017

In July 2016, ACH checked off one of his initial goals in professional wrestling, when he made his Japanese debut by entering Pro Wrestling Noah's 2016 NTV G+ Cup Junior Heavyweight Tag League, alongside Taiji Ishimori. After a record of four wins and one loss, ACH and Ishimori advanced to the finals of the tournament, where, on July 30, they defeated Atsushi Kotoge and Daisuke Harada to win the 2016 NTV G+ Cup Junior Heavyweight Tag League, which guaranteed them a shot at Kotoge and Harada's GHC Junior Heavyweight Tag Team Championship. The match took place at a NJPW show on August 21 and saw the champions retain their title. ACH returned to NJPW on October 21, when he and Ishimori entered the 2016 Super Jr. Tag Tournament, defeating the reigning IWGP Junior Heavyweight Tag Team Champions The Young Bucks (Matt Jackson and Nick Jackson) in their first round match. On October 30, ACH and Ishimori defeated David Finlay and Ricochet to advance to the finals of the tournament. On November 5 at Power Struggle, ACH and Ishimori were defeated in the finals of the tournament by Roppongi Vice (Beretta and Rocky Romero).

On January 4, 2017, ACH returned to NJPW at Wrestle Kingdom 11 in Tokyo Dome. Working under a mask as Tiger the Dark from the Tiger Mask W anime series, he was defeated by Tiger Mask W in the opening match. On May 3, NJPW announced ACH as a participant in the 2017 Best of the Super Juniors tournament. He finished the tournament with a record of three wins and four losses, failing to advance to the finals. ACH returned to NJPW in October and joined the Taguchi Japan stable, when he and Ryusuke Taguchi entered the 2017 Super Jr. Tag Tournament as Super 69. After wins over the Suzuki-gun teams of Taichi and Taka Michinoku; and El Desperado and Yoshinobu Kanemaru, the two made it to the finals of the tournament. On November 5 at Power Struggle, Super 69 were defeated in the finals of the tournament by the reigning IWGP Junior Heavyweight Tag Team Champions, Roppongi 3K (Sho and Yoh). On May 8, he was announced as a participant in the 2018 Best of the Super Juniors tournament. He finished the tournament with 3 wins and 4 losses, failing to advance to the finals.

=== WWE (2019) ===
It was announced on February 11, 2019, that ACH signed a contract with WWE and begun working at the WWE Performance Center. On March 7, ACH made his debut at a NXT house show, in a losing effort to Raul Mendoza. From then on he wrestled at various NXT live events in the Florida area, losing to other NXT talents such as, Raul Mendoza, Kassius Ohno, Marcel Barthel, Dan Matha and Shane Thorne. During WrestleMania Axxess before WrestleMania 35 in April 2019, he faced Gran Metalik and Ligero in a triple threat match during a WWE Worlds Collide event. His first win on NXT occurred on April 12, when he defeated Kona Reeves at a NXT live event. Throughout May and June, he continued wrestling on the Florida house show circuit, winning most of his matches. On June 10, 2019, he started going by the new ring name Jordan Myles.

In June, it was announced that Myles would compete in the NXT Breakout Tournament, where the winner would get an opportunity to challenge for any title in NXT. Myles made his television debut in the tournament on the July 10 episode of NXT, defeating Boa in the first round, and Angel Garza in the second round. In the finals, Myles defeated Cameron Grimes to win the tournament and chose to challenge Adam Cole for the NXT Championship, but was defeated on the September 4 episode of NXT.

In October 2019, Hardie was involved in a controversy after WWE launched a Jordan Myles t-shirt, which depicted his name surrounded by the shape of a mouth, said to be inspired by The Rolling Stones logo. However, the design received accusations, including from Hardie, that it resembled blackface. WWE changed the t-shirt and published a note stating Hardie gave his approval to the design. After that, Hardie published a series of tweets accusing WWE of racism. Hardie would also accuse his former employer Ring of Honor (ROH) of racism, calling former ROH World Champion Jay Lethal (who is also African-American) an "Uncle Tom". Hardie's comments towards Lethal received criticism from wrestling legends like Booker T, who noted that Hardie over-reacted with his aggressive comments, specifically targeting Lethal, Triple H and Vince McMahon. WWE wrestler Titus O'Neil said he agreed with Hardie about the t-shirt, but not how he brought others into his frustrations. Hardie subsequently apologized for his overreaction, but nonetheless claimed he would not take back his comments. On November 13, Hardie posted a profanity-laden video, exclaiming that he quit WWE, and stated that he "refused to work for racists", and that Jordan Myles was his "slave name". On November 21, WWE officially announced that Hardie was released from his contract, as Hardie subsequently announced several indie dates.

=== Return to independent circuit (2019-Present) ===
Hardie returned to the independent circuit after he was released by WWE. On December 6, 2019 Major League Wrestling (MLW) announced that Hardie, once again using his ACH ring name, had signed with the company. ACH wrestled on the Opera Cup set of TV tapings, teaming with former MMA fighter King Mo. The very next day Hardie announced on Twitter that he was quitting professional wrestling, prompting MLW to release the statement "We respect ACH's decision and want him to be happy." However, Hardie made his return on December 29, 2019, during an Atlanta Wrestling Entertainment event. He also participated on some events of Game Changer Wrestling (GCW), where he won the DDT's Ironman Heavymetalweight Championship from Joey Janela.

=== Return to NJPW (2020) ===
On August 10, 2020, it was announced that ACH would be returning to New Japan Pro-Wrestling as a part of their new weekly series NJPW Strong on August 14 where he teamed with Alex Zayne and TJP to take on Blake Christian, Misterioso and PJ Black.

On November 2, 2020, ACH was announced for NJPW's Super J-Cup tournament.

=== Major League Wrestling (2022) ===
In 2022, ACH was announced to be the replacement for Alex Shelley on the Major League Wrestling roster, but never ended up appearing for the promotion.

=== House of Glory Wrestling (2022) ===
On May 27, 2022, at House of Glory ACH wrestled Low Ki.

== Other media ==
Albert has a 2-Disc Ring of Honor (ROH) DVD out starring him called GoGo ACH.

== Championships and accomplishments ==
- AAW Wrestling
  - AAW Heavyweight Championship (1 time)
  - AAW Heritage Championship (2 times)
  - AAW Tag Team Championship (1 time) – with Jah-C
  - AAW Heritage Championship Tournament (2013)
  - Sixth Triple Crown Champion
- Anarchy Championship Wrestling
  - ACW Heavyweight Championship (1 time)
  - ACW Tag Team Championship (1 time) – with Kody Lane
  - ACW U-30 Young Gun Championship (1 time)
  - Lone Star Classic (2011)
- Atlanta Wrestling Entertainment
  - GWC Championship (2 times)
- DDT Pro-Wrestling
  - Ironman Heavymetalweight Championship (1 time)
- Evolve
  - Evolve Tag Team Championship (1 time) – with Ethan Page
- High Risk Wrestling
  - HRW High Risk Championship (1 time, inaugural)
  - HRW High Risk Title Tournament (2014)
- Inspire Pro Wrestling
  - Inspire Pro Pure Prestige Championship (1 time)
- Metro Pro Wrestling
  - MPW Central States Championship (1 time)
  - NWA Central States Heavyweight Championship (1 time)
  - NWA Central States Heavyweight Championship Tournament (2012)
- New School Federation
  - NSF Central Texas Championship (1 time)
  - NSF Heavyweight Championship (1 time)
- NWA Houston
  - NWA Lone Star Junior Heavyweight Championship (1 time)
- Pro Wrestling Epic
  - Epic 8 Tournament (2013)
- Pro Wrestling Illustrated
  - Ranked No. 58 of the top 500 singles wrestlers in the PWI 500 in 2015
- Pro Wrestling Noah
  - NTV G+ Cup Junior Heavyweight Tag League (2016) – with Taiji Ishimori
- Total Championship Wrestling
  - TCW Lightning Division Championship (1 time)
- VIP Wrestling
  - VIP Heavyweight Championship (2 times, inaugural)
- World of Wrestling
  - WoW Cruiserweight Championship (1 time)
- WrestleMax STL
  - WrestleMax STL River City Championship (1 time)
- WWE
  - NXT Breakout Tournament (2019)
