= Tiger Mask W =

Japanese anime television series

- Promotional artwork
- タイガーマスクＷ
- Genre: Sports (professional wrestling)
- Based on: Tiger Mask by Ikki Kajiwara and Naoki Tsuji
- Developed by: Katsuhiko Chiba
- Directed by: Toshiaki Komura
- Music by: Yasuharu Takanashi; -yaiba-
- Country of origin: Japan
- Original language: Japanese
- No. of episodes: 38 (list of episodes)

Production
- Producers: Hiroshi Yanai; Gyarmath Bogdan
- Production companies: TV Asahi; Toei Animation

Original release
- Network: ANN (TV Asahi)
- Release: October 2, 2016 – July 2, 2017

Tiger Mask W (Japanese: タイガーマスクＷ(ダブル); Taigā Masuku Daburu) is a Tiger Mask anime series which premiered on October 2, 2016, with 38 episodes. It has a mix of 2D and 3D CGI animation.

It is a sequel of the original anime, whereas Tiger Mask II is only considered a parallel universe.

== Plot ==
Following the destruction of Zipangu Pro-Wrestling by the Global Wrestling Monopoly (GWM) and the defeat of manager Daisuke Fuji by Yellow Devil, two young wrestlers, Naoto Azuma and Takuma Fuji, vow revenge. They train separately; Naoto under Kentaro Takaoka and Takuma within the sinister Tiger's Den. Years later, Naoto emerges as the new Tiger Mask for New Japan Pro-Wrestling while Takuma becomes Tiger the Dark for the GWM, neither aware of the other's identity.

The GWM, led by Miss X, targets Tiger Mask. Both rivals pursue Yellow Devil, culminating in Tiger the Dark challenging the GWM's world champion, Tiger the Third. During their match, Tiger the Third reveals himself as the true Yellow Devil and defeats Takuma, leading to a emotional unmasking and reunion between the two friends.

Tiger Mask is then coerced into betraying NJPW to earn a title shot. The conflict escalates into the Final Wars, a series of matches where NJPW and allies face the GWM. In the final sudden death match, Tiger Mask defeats Tiger the Third, destroying the Tiger's Den.

Afterward, Naoto and Takuma depart to wrestle overseas together as Tiger Mask W. Miss X founds the Girls Wrestling Movement, recruiting Haruna Takaoka, who overcomes familial opposition to become a champion known as Spring Tiger.

== Broadcast ==
- Director: Toshiaki Komura
- Script: Katsuhiko Chiba
- Music: Yasuharu Takanashi and -yaiba-
- Character Design: Hisashi Kagawa
- Art Design: Yoshito Watanabe
- Action Animation Director: Junichi Hayama

The opening theme is "Ike! Tiger Mask" ( 行け!タイガーマスク; Go! Tiger Mask) by Shōnan no Kaze and the ending theme is "KING OF THE WILD" also by Shonan no Kaze. The opening theme is a new rendition of the opening in the original Tiger Mask, which was originally performed by Hideyo Morimoto. The show airs on TV Asahi's 26:45 (2:45 AM) time slot on Saturday, technically Sunday morning.

Naoto Date's training facility on Mount Fuji and his dream about a children's land are original from the manga, but omitted in the first anime.

== Promotion ==
In conjunction with the premiere of the show, NJPW debuted a live action version of Tiger Mask W, portrayed by Kota Ibushi, on October 10, 2016, at their King of Pro-Wrestling event. Since then, Red Death Mask, portrayed by Juice Robinson, and Tiger the Dark, portrayed by A. C. H., have also debuted for NJPW.
