= Juice Robinson =

American professional wrestler (born 1989)

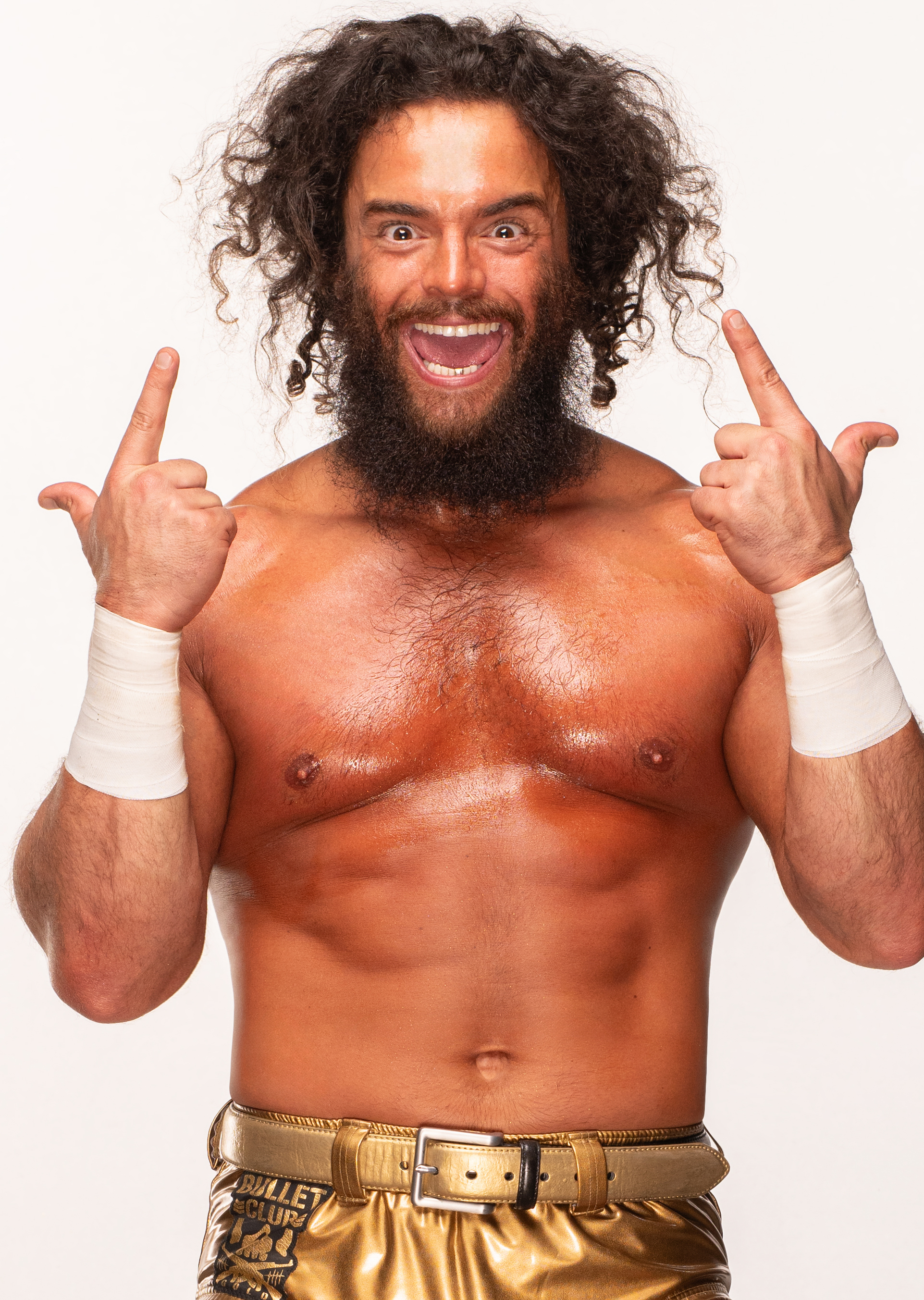
- Robinson in 2024

Personal information
- Born: Joseph Ryan Robinson; April 10, 1989 (age 37) Joliet, Illinois, U.S.
- Spouse: Toni Storm (m. 2022)

Professional wrestling career
- Ring name(s): CJP; CJ Parker; Juice; Juice Robinson; Red Death Mask
- Billed height: 6 ft 3 in (1.91 m)
- Billed weight: 218 lb (99 kg)
- Billed from: Joliet, Illinois
- Trained by: Danny Daniels; Hiroshi Tanahashi; Kota Ibushi; NJPW Dojo; Truth Martini; WWE Performance Center
- Debut: 2008

Joseph Ryan Robinson (born April 10, 1989), better known by his ring name Juice Robinson, (Note: When wrestling for NJPW, his ring name is written in katakana as ジュース・ロビンソン (Jūsu Robinson).) is an American professional wrestler. He is signed to All Elite Wrestling (AEW), where he is a member of The Cut stable.

From 2011 through 2015, he worked for WWE, where he wrestled in their developmental territories Florida Championship Wrestling (FCW) and later NXT under the ring name CJ Parker. He won the FCW Florida Tag Team Championship twice, with Jason Jordan and Donny Marlow respectively.

After departing WWE, Robinson started his New Japan Pro-Wrestling (NJPW) career as young lion before becoming a full-time roster member. Since then, he has become a record three-time IWGP United States Heavyweight Champion and a one-time IWGP Tag Team Champion (with David Finlay). He was also the winner of the 2019 World Tag League with Finlay.

== Professional wrestling career ==
=== Early career (2008–2011) ===
Robinson was trained at Truth Martini's House of Truth wrestling school. In 2008, he made his debut for Independent Wrestling Association Mid-South (IWA) under the ring name "Juice Robinson", losing to Jason Dukes. He competed in an IWA Mid-South Heavyweight Championship number one contender seven team Royal Rumble, losing to Devon Moore and Nick Gage. His last match for IWA Mid-South was a loss in a three-way to Shane Hollister. Robinson then wrestled for a variety of promotions, including AAW Wrestling, where he unsuccessfully competed for the AAW Tag Team Championship twice (once with Mike Sydal as his partner and once with Kyle O'Reilly), Border City Wrestling (BCW), and DreamWave Wrestling, where he unsuccessfully challenged for both the DreamWave World and DreamWave Tag Team Championships. His last match for DreamWave was a victory against Colt Cabana. Robinson made his National Wrestling Alliance (NWA) debut with a win against Doctor X. His last match in NWA was a win against Dom Vitalli.

=== WWE (2011–2015) ===
==== Florida Championship Wrestling (2011–2012) ====
In 2011, Robinson signed a developmental contract with WWE and was sent to Florida Championship Wrestling (FCW). On July 7, he made his debut under the ring name "CJ Parker" and was defeated by Leo Kruger. He then formed a tag team with Donny Marlow. At the FCW taping on July 21, Parker and Donny Marlow defeated Calvin Raines and Big E Langston to win the FCW Florida Tag Team Championship. At the FCW taping on September 22, Parker and Marlow successfully defended their titles against Calvin Raines and James Bronson. They lost the championships on November 3 to the team of Brad Maddox and Briley Pierce. After losing the titles, Parker and Marlow disbanded as a team and transitioned to singles competition. On January 26, 2012, Parker was defeated by Dean Ambrose. He then competed mostly in tag team matches with a variety of partners for the rest of his tenure in FCW, teaming with the likes of Jason Jordan and Mike Dalton until FCW was closed and replaced by NXT in August 2012. Shortly before the promotion's closure Parker won the Florida Tag Team Championship for a second time, winning the title with Jason Jordan at a live event.

==== NXT (2012–2015) ====
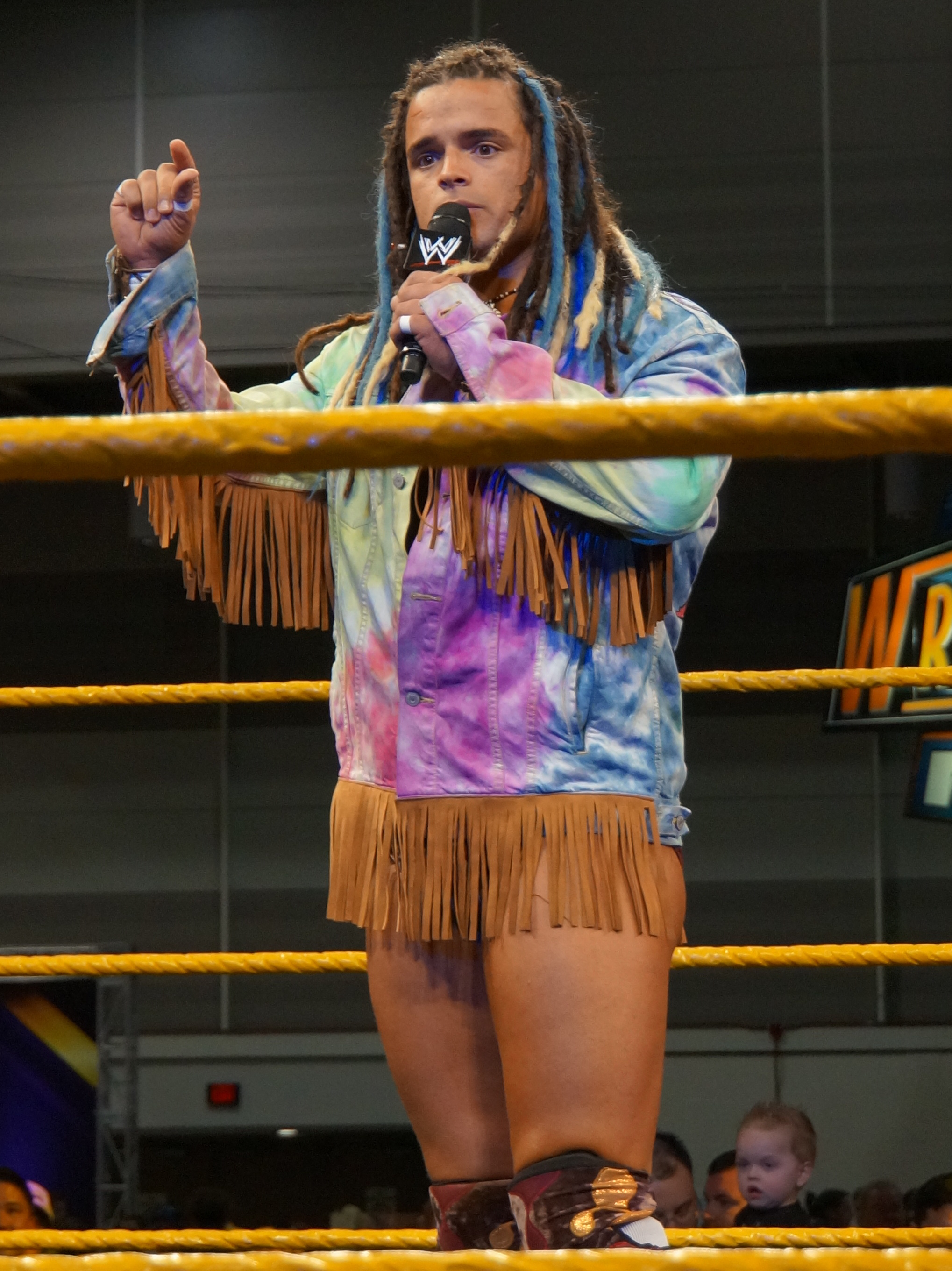
CJ Parker in 2014

On the July 4, 2012, episode of NXT, Parker teamed with Nick Rogers in a losing effort against Corey Graves and Jake Carter. He was then initially used as a jobber on NXT and was defeated by the likes of Roman Reigns and in a tag team match with Mike Dalton against The Ascension, before suffering an injury that kept him out of action for several months.

Parker returned to NXT in July 2013 with a new hippie character, beginning a feud with Tyler Breeze that saw the two trading wins over several months. Although intended to be a fan favorite, Parker's hippie gimmick was largely unpopular and he was turned heel as a result on the February 12, 2014, edition of NXT, berating the fans for not getting behind him, calling them "Sheeple", and blaming them for the growing issues with the environment. He would tweak his character to that of an eco-warrior who berated fans for damaging the environment. Parker beat Tye Dillinger in January 2014 but was then largely unsuccessful, losing to main roster stars like Antonio Cesaro, The Miz and The Great Khali, as well as a defeat by Mojo Rawley at NXT Arrival.

Parker began a feud with Xavier Woods, defeating Woods twice on NXT before resuming his losing streak against Adrian Neville. At NXT TakeOver: Fatal 4-Way, Parker was squashed by Baron Corbin in Corbin's official debut, and he then suffered further losses to Corbin and Breeze in the following weeks before losing to the debuting Kevin Owens at NXT TakeOver: R Evolution. During the match, Parker legitimately broke Owens' nose with a palm strike, himself suffering a deep gash to the hand. On the February 18 episode of NXT, Parker attempted a protest due to him not appearing at NXT TakeOver: Rival. However, he was attacked by the debuting Solomon Crowe. His final televised appearance was in a losing effort to Hideo Itami on the taped in advance April 22 episode of NXT. On March 31, 2015, it was reported that Parker had left WWE after requesting his release from the company. WWE later announced that he officially confirmed his release on April 3, 2015.

=== Independent circuit (2015–2017) ===
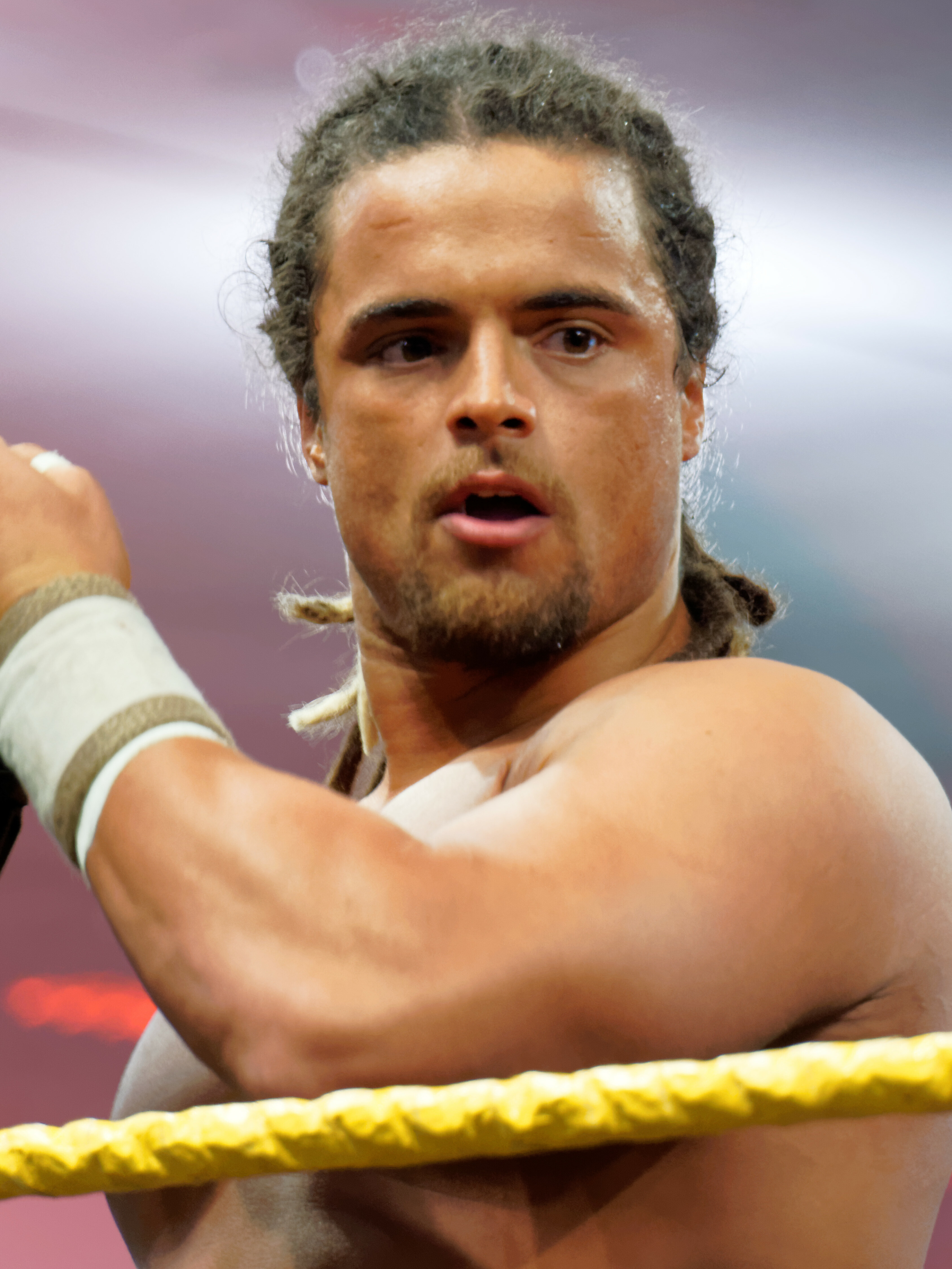
Parker in 2015

It was announced that Parker would be wrestling at Combat Zone Wrestling's CZW Best of the Best XIV on April 11, 2015, under the ring name "CJP". He made it to the semi-finals before being defeated by Mike Bailey. In July 2015, Robinson competed for All Star Wrestling on the holiday camp circuit including shows at Butlins and forming a tag team with Sam Adonis. He also wrestled for other European indy groups including International Pro Wrestling: United Kingdom (IPW:UK). Robinson retired the CJP persona at the end of August 2015, returning to the ring name "Juice Robinson".

In 2016, Robinson worked in Japan for the first time. On March 27, he appeared on a show promoted by Minoru Suzuki, called We Are Suzuki-gun 2, in a special six man match between wrestlers of Pro Wrestling Noah and New Japan Pro-Wrestling (NJPW). Representing NJPW, he teamed with Tencozy (Hiroyoshi Tenzan and Satoshi Kojima) in a defeat to Katsuhiko Nakajima, Maybach Taniguchi and Mitsuhiro Kitamiya. On October 22, he appeared on Noah's Autumn Navigation tour, where he teamed with Katsuyori Shibata, defeating Taniguchi and Go Shiozaki.

On June 21, 2017, Consejo Mundial de Lucha Libre (CMLL) announced that Robinson as a participant in the 2017 International Gran Prix. On August 18, 2017, Robinson with Marco Corleone and Matt Taven defeated Diamante Azul, Valiente and Volador Jr. in Arena México. On August 26, Robinson defeated Shocker in Arena Coliseo. On September 1, Robinson was eliminated from the International Gran Prix torneo cibernetico by Volador Jr. Robinson's Mexican tour concluded the following day.

=== New Japan Pro-Wrestling (2015–2023) ===
==== Young Lion (2015–2016) ====
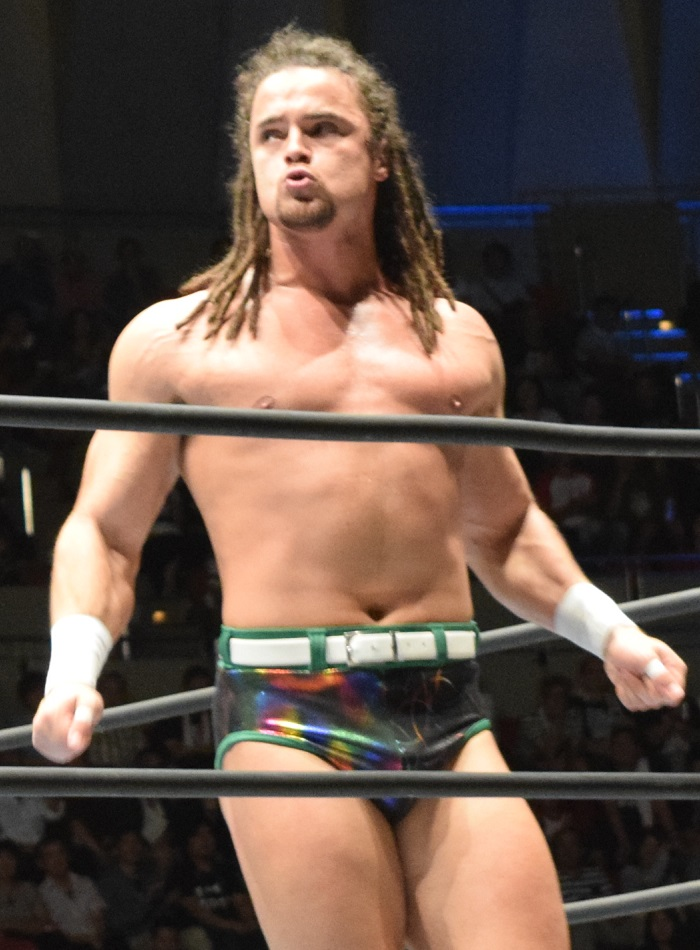
Robinson in September 2015

On August 24, 2015, New Japan Pro-Wrestling (NJPW) announced that Robinson would be working the following month's Destruction tour under his Juice Robinson ring name. He made his debut on September 4 in a six-man tag team match, where he, Kota Ibushi and Tetsuya Naito were defeated by Katsuyori Shibata, Tiger Mask and Togi Makabe. On October 11, NJPW announced that Robinson had signed a contract with the promotion, becoming a full-time member of its roster. Robinson spent the rest of 2015 working as a Young Lion and in multiman tag matches, on December 16 he had his first singles match in New Japan facing fellow Young Lion Jay White, whom he defeated. Robinson participated in Fantastica Mania 2016. On February 25, 2016, Robinson took part in the first of New Japan's Lion's Gate show, where he was defeated by Katsuhiko Nakajima. On March 20, Robinson received his first title shot in NJPW, when he, Hiroshi Tanahashi and Michael Elgin unsuccessfully challenged The Elite (Kenny Omega, Matt Jackson and Nick Jackson) for the NEVER Openweight 6-Man Tag Team Championship. At King of Pro-Wrestling, Robinson wrestled Tiger Mask W as Red Death Mask, a character based in the anime series Tiger Mask W. In late 2016, Robinson took part in the 2016 World Tag League, teaming with Hiroshi Tanahashi. The two finished the tournament with a record of three wins and four losses.

==== United States Heavyweight Champion (2017–2019) ====
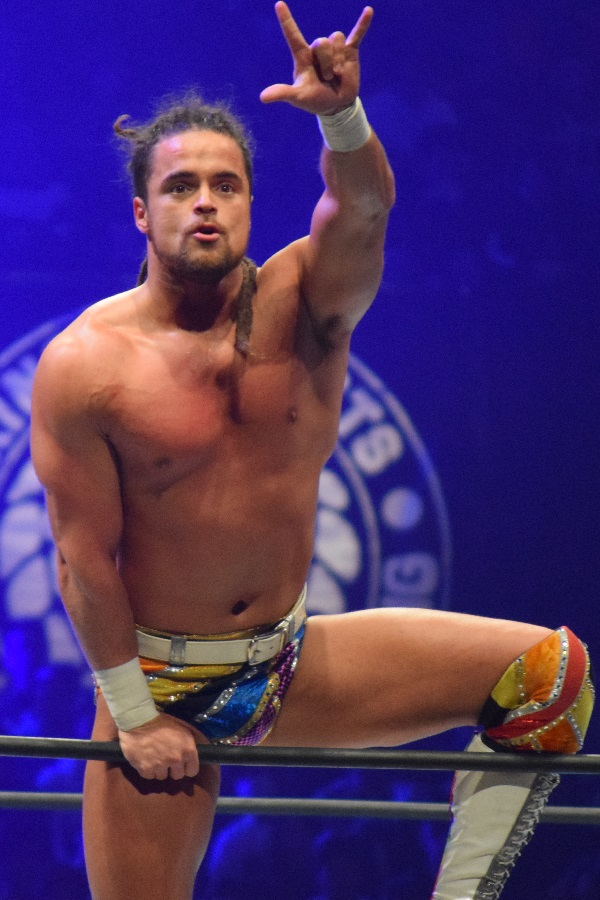
Robinson posing in the ring in 2017

On January 5, 2017, Robinson scored a major win over NEVER Openweight Champion Hirooki Goto in a ten-man tag team match and afterwards indicated he wanted a shot at his title. Robinson received his title shot on February 5 at The New Beginning in Sapporo, but was defeated by Goto. On April 9 at Sakura Genesis 2017, Robinson picked up the biggest win of his career, pinning former IWGP Heavyweight Champion Tetsuya Naito in an eight-man tag team match and afterwards challenging him to a match for the IWGP Intercontinental Championship. Robinson received his title shot on April 29 at Wrestling Toyonokuni 2017, but was defeated by Naito. In early 2017, Robinson became part of the Taguchi Japan stable, as part of which he unsuccessfully challenged for the NEVER Openweight 6-Man Tag Team Championship, first on June 11 at Dominion 6.11 in Osaka-jo Hall and again on June 20 at Kizuna Road 2017. On July 1 at G1 Special in USA, Robinson took part in a tournament to determine the inaugural IWGP United States Heavyweight Champion, but was eliminated in his first round match by Zack Sabre Jr. Later that month, Robinson entered his first G1 Climax tournament. On August 5, Robinson picked up a major win over the winner of the 2016 G1 Climax and reigning IWGP United States Heavyweight Champion Kenny Omega. Robinson went on to finish in the bottom half of his block with a record of four wins and five losses. On September 24 at Destruction in Kobe, Robinson unsuccessfully challenged Omega for the United States Heavyweight Championship. At the end of the year, Robinson formed a tag team named "Death Juice" with the debuting Sami Callihan in the 2017 World Tag League. The team finished second in their block with a record of four wins and three losses, failing to advance to the finals.

At the G1 Special in San Francisco, Robinson defeated Jay White to win the IWGP United States Heavyweight Championship, his first championship in NJPW. He also became the first American to hold the championship. Robinson entered the 2018 G1 Climax as part of the A block, finishing with 6 points. After an attack by Cody, Robinson was scheduled to face him at Fighting Spirit Unleashed, where he lost his IWGP United States Heavyweight Championship. Robinson then teamed with David Finlay, calling themselves FinJuice, in the 2018 World Tag League and finished with 16 points, missing the tournament final. At Wrestle Kingdom 13, he defeated Cody to reclaim the IWGP United States Heavyweight Championship, becoming the first wrestler to have held the championship more than once. He made his debut in the New Japan Cup in 2019, losing in the first round to Chase Owens. Owens then began challenging Robinson to a title match, while repeatedly assaulting Robinson, leading to a title defense at the New Japan Cup Finale. On March 24, in the semi-main event of the night, Robinson successfully defended the IWGP United States Heavyweight Championship against Owens. On May 27, after weeks of New Japan Pro-Wrestling airing videos of a mystery man targeting Robinson, Jon Moxley was revealed as the culprit. The match was made official for 2019 Best Of The Super Juniors finals at Ryōgoku Sumo Hall on June 5, where Robinson lost the championship to Moxley, ending his reign at 152 days and three successful title defenses. During this time, Robinson would shed his signature dreadlocks for a shorter hairstyle. Robinson would next compete in the 2019 G1 Climax in the B block, which he failed to win, ending with 8 points. In the B block finals, Robinson defeated Moxley to eliminate him from the competition. This would lead to Moxley issuing a challenge for Robinson to face him in a No Disqualification match for the IWGP United States Championship at King of Pro-Wrestling. However, Moxley was unable to defend his championship due to travel issues and was subsequently stripped of the title. Instead, Robinson faced Lance Archer at the event for the vacant title, but lost. After a post match attack from Archer, former tag team partner David Finlay made his return from injury to save Robinson.

==== FinJuice (2019–2022) ====
Finlay and Robinson went on to reform FinJuice and competed in the 2019 World Tag League. On the last night of the tournament, FinJuice defeated Los Ingobernables de Japón (Evil and Sanada) in the finals to win the World Tag League, entitling them to a match for the IWGP Tag Team Championship at Wrestle Kingdom 14. During the first night of Wrestle Kingdom 14 on January 4, 2020, FinJuice defeated the Guerrillas of Destiny (Tanga Loa and Tama Tonga) to win the IWGP Tag Team Championship. On night 2 of Wrestle Kingdom, Robinson faced Moxley for the United States Championship, but lost. FinJuice lost the championship back to the Guerrillas of Destiny at The New Beginning in USA on February 1, ending the team's reign at 28 days.

==== Bullet Club (2022–2023) ====
On May 1, Robinson returned to NJPW during Wrestling Dontaku 2022 wearing a Bullet Club vest, attacked Hiroshi Tanahashi, and stated his intentions to win back Tanahashi's newly won IWGP United States Heavyweight Championship, turning heel in the process. At NJPW's Capital Collision event, he pinned Will Ospreay in a Four-way match to win the title for a record-tying third time. Robinson was scheduled to defend the title in a Triple threat match against Sanada and Ospreay at Dominion 6.12 in Osaka-jo Hall but was stripped of the title and pulled from the match due to suffering from appendicitis, ending his reign at 28 days; however, he refused to return the physical belt, despite Ospreay beating Sanada for the vacant title, and claimed he was never beaten for it and therefore would refuse to relinquish it. On June 12 during Dominion 6.12 in Osaka-jo Hall, Robinson was announced as a participant in the G1 Climax 32 tournament starting in July, as a part of the D block. Before the start of the tournament, Robinson appeared at AEW x NJPW: Forbidden Door, taunting Ospreay with the IWGP United States Championship belt from a luxury box, after Ospreay's successful defense against Orange Cassidy. In the G1 tournament, Robinson scored 4 points in his block, finishing last in his block and failing to advance to the semi-finals, while also losing the physical IWGP U.S. belt to Ospreay.

On May 21, 2023, at Resurgence, Robnsion defeated Fred Rosser in a Street Fight with assistance from his real-life wife Toni Storm. This would be Robinson's final NJPW date.

=== Ring of Honor (2018–2019) ===
Robinson and Finlay appeared at the Ring of Honor (ROH) television tapings at Center Stage in Atlanta, Georgia, and they had Tenille Dashwood, Mark Haskins, Tracy "Hot Sauce" Williams and Bandido by their side. Robinson announced that the group would be named Lifeblood, and their goal was to restore honor back to ROH. ROH World Champion Jay Lethal would come out to confront the new group and Robinson challenged Lethal to get four teammates and compete with Lifeblood in a 10-man tag team match. However, in June, he left the promotion to prioritise his career in New Japan.

=== Impact Wrestling (2021) ===
On February 13, 2021, at No Surrender, a video package aired FinJuice arriving to Impact Wrestling as part of a partnership between Impact and New Japan Pro-Wrestling. Three days later, on the following week's Impact!, they made their debut and defeated Reno Scum. Afterwards, they would have a feud with The Good Brothers (Doc Gallows and Karl Anderson), defeating them at Sacrifice to win the Impact World Tag Team Championship. FinJuice would lose the titles two months later on the May 17, 2021, episode of Impact! to Violent By Design.

=== All Elite Wrestling (2022–present) ===
==== Championship pursuits (2022–2023) ====
Robinson made his debut for All Elite Wrestling (AEW) on the September 28 edition of Dynamite where he faced Jon Moxley in an AEW World Championship Eliminator match in a losing effort. On December 2, it was reported Robinson officially signed with AEW. Robinson returned to Ring of Honor, now AEW's sister promotion through AEW Owner Tony Khan's purchase, at Final Battle on December 10, facing champion Samoa Joe for his ROH Television Championship, which he failed to win. On January 11, 2023, Robinson challenged Darby Allin for the AEW TNT Championship on Rampage, but lost the match.

==== Bullet Club Gold / Bang Bang Gang (2023–2026) ====
On the March 8, 2023, episode of Dynamite, Robinson made a surprise appearance attacking Ricky Starks by distracting him with the Bullet Club entrance theme music. The two men were set to face off on the April 5 edition of Dynamite, though before the match former Bullet Club leader Jay White made his debut after signing with AEW, attacking Starks alongside Robinson, causing a no-contest and reuniting the former stablemates. One week later on the April 12 edition of Dynamite, White referred to himself and Juice Robinson as Bullet Club Gold. On the April 28 edition of Rampage, White and Robinson successfully defeated Starks and Shawn Spears. On May 28 at Double or Nothing, both White and Robinson competed in the Blackjack Battle Royale for the AEW International Championship, but both men were eliminated by Starks. After eliminating Starks from the match, the three men brawled backstage, until Starks was saved by the AEW World Tag Team Champions FTR. On the July 1 episode of Collision, Robinson competed in the Owen Hart Foundation Men's Tournament, losing to Starks in the quarterfinals of the tournament. On the October 18 edition of Dynamite, Robinson competed in the Dynamite Dozen Battle Royale, last eliminating Max Caster to add the Dynamite Diamond Ring as a second prize to his AEW World Championship match. On the October 25 edition of Dynamite, Robinson unsuccessfully challenged for the Dynamite Diamond Ring against MJF. On November 20, it was reported that Robinson would be taking some time off due to a back injury that would require surgery. During his hiatus, Bullet Club Gold was renamed to Bang Bang Gang.

On May 26, 2024, at Double or Nothing, Robinson returned from injury by assisting his fellow Bang Bang Gang stablemates to defeat Death Triangle (Pac, Rey Fénix, and Penta El Zero Miedo) to retain their Unified World Trios Championship (AEW World Trios Championship and ROH World Six-Man Tag Team Championship). On the June 5 Rampage tapings, Robinson wrestled his first match since his return, teaming with the Gunns to win a trios match. After the match, White announced that he was giving Robinson a share of the Unified Trios Championship held by White and the Gunns, thus invoking the Freebird Rule. However, on the July 13 episode of Collision, interim AEW Executive Vice President Christopher Daniels overruled Bang Bang Gang's attempt to invoke the Freebird Rule and stripped them of the Unified World Trios Championship. On the following week, Robinson and The Gunns failed to win the vacant AEW World Trios Championship, which was won by The Patriarchy (Christian Cage, Killswitch and Nick Wayne). On August 25 at All In, Robinson and The Gunns participated in a four-way ladder match for the trios titles, which was won by Pac and Blackpool Combat Club (Claudio Castagnoli and Wheeler Yuta). On November 24, Robinson was announced as a participant in the 2024 Continental Classic, but on December 3, Robinson was pulled from the tournament due to injury and was subsequently replaced by Komander.

On July 12, 2025, at All In, Robinson returned from injury as a participant in the men's Casino Gauntlet match, but failed to win. Due to an injury to Colten Gunn, Robinson began teaming with Austin Gunn as the duo entered tournaments for an AEW World Tag Team Championship match, but were quickly eliminated. On the September 27 episode of Collision, Robinson and Austin added Ace Austin to the Bang Bang Gang due to injures to Colten and Jay White. At Worlds End on December 27, Robinson and Austin unsuccessfully challenged FTR for the AEW World Tag Team Championships in a Chicago Street Fight.

On July 26 at Redemption, Robinson and Jay White were defeated by The Dogs (David Finlay and Clark Connors) in a Double Chain match due to interference from members of the Death Riders.

==== The Cut (2026–present) ====
On the October 21 episode of Dynamite, the Bang Bang Gang turned heel after aligning with The Dogs to attack the Death Riders and the Conglomeration. After initially naming the alliance The Last Outfit on the October 24 episode of Collision, Jay White announced that the group would instead be known as The Cut. In November 2026, it was reported that Robinson would be taking time off and was written off in an off-screen attack.

== Personal life ==
He is half-Palestinian. He is good friends with David Finlay and acted as groomsman at his wedding in May 2018. He has been married to fellow professional wrestler Toni Storm since 2022.

== Championships and accomplishments ==
- All Elite Wrestling
  - Dynamite Dozen Battle Royale (2023)
- Florida Championship Wrestling
  - FCW Florida Tag Team Championship (2 times) – with Jason Jordan (1) and Donny Marlow (1)
- Impact Wrestling
  - Impact World Tag Team Championship (1 time) – with David Finlay
- New Japan Pro-Wrestling
  - IWGP United States Heavyweight Championship (3 times)
  - IWGP Tag Team Championship (1 time) – with David Finlay
  - World Tag League (2019) – with David Finlay
- Pro Wrestling Illustrated
  - Ranked No. 32 of the top 500 singles wrestlers in the PWI 500 in 2019
