= Matt Taven =

American professional wrestler (born 1985)

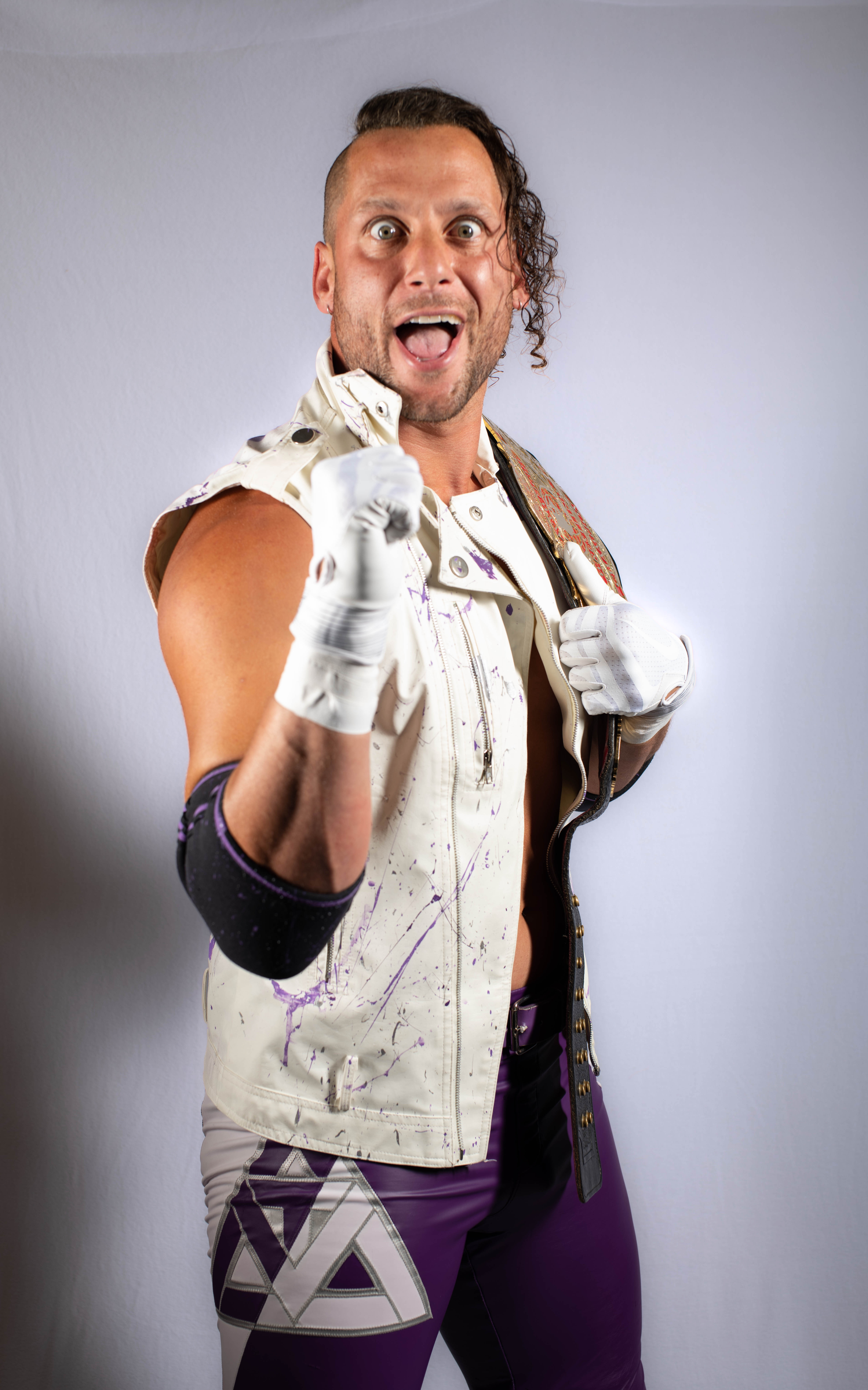
- Taven in 2023

Personal information
- Born: Matthew Marinelli; March 20, 1985 (age 41) Derry, New Hampshire, U.S.

Professional wrestling career
- Ring name(s): Matt Taven; Matthew Taven; The Romantic Touch
- Billed height: 6 ft 2 in (1.88 m)
- Billed weight: 212 lb (96 kg)
- Billed from: Los Angeles, California; Boston, Massachusetts
- Debut: March 7, 2008

Matthew Marinelli (born March 20, 1985), better known by his ring name Matt Taven, is an American professional wrestler and trainer. He is signed to Ring of Honor (ROH), where he is one-half of The Kingdom with Michael Bennett.

Taven is best known for his work with ROH as an original member of The Kingdom, being the former leader of its 2016-19 revival incarnation. He is a former ROH World Champion, ROH World Television Champion, three-time ROH World Tag Team Champion with Mike Bennett, and a three-time ROH World Six-Man Tag Team Champion with T. K. O'Ryan and Vinny Marseglia. Taven has also worked for the Japanese promotion New Japan Pro-Wrestling (NJPW), where he is a former IWGP Tag Team Champion, Impact Wrestling, where he is a former Impact World Tag Team Champion, and Consejo Mundial de Lucha Libre (CMLL), where he is a former NWA World Historic Welterweight Champion and participated in the main event of the CMLL 85th Anniversary Show.

In addition to wrestling, Taven and Bennett operated a wrestling school in West Warwick, Rhode Island.

== Professional wrestling career ==
=== Early career (2008–2009) ===
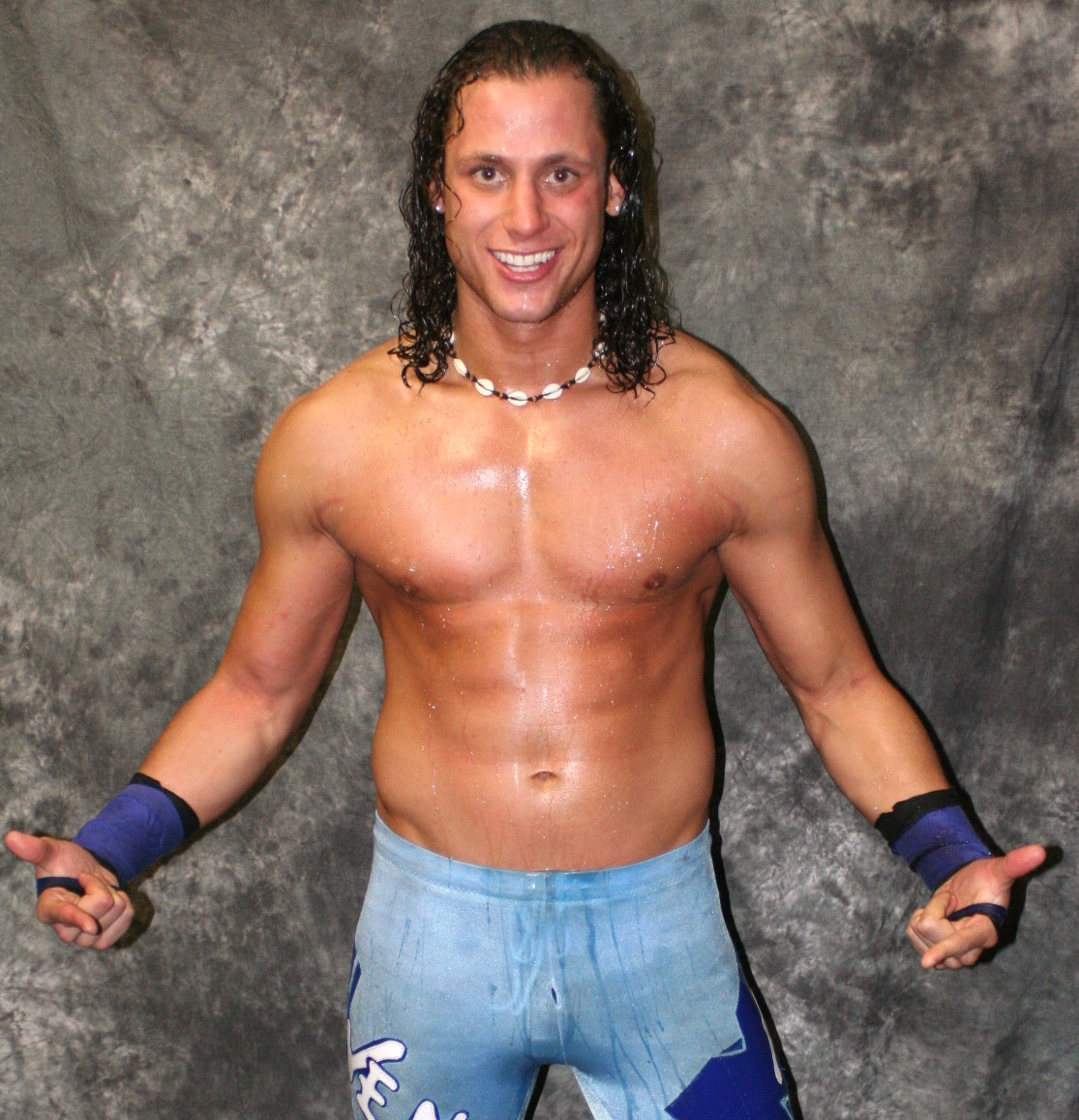
Taven in 2010

Marinelli, using the ring name Matt Taven, made his professional wrestling debut on March 7, 2008. During his first year, Taven worked mainly for Top Rope Promotions (TRP) and Collision Pro Wrestling (CPW) in Massachusetts. While working for TRP, he challenged for the vacant TRP Interstate Championship in a six-way ladder match that also included Buck Nasty, Gregory Edwards, J. Freddie, Ryan Waters and Spike Dudley; Nasty won the title.

=== Ring of Honor (2009–2021) ===
==== Debut; ROH Television Champion (2009–2014) ====
Taven debuted for Ring of Honor (ROH) on May 8, 2009, losing a dark match to Jaleel Patel. He competed in tag team matches over the course of 2010 and 2011, but lost every outing. At Boiling Point on August 11, 2012, Taven faced Antonio Thomas, Q. T. Marshall and Vinny Marseglia in a four-way match where the winner would receive an ROH contract, but was pinned by Marshall. He won the Top Prospect Tournament the following year, with his storyline reward being a full-time ROH contract and ROH World Television Championship match against Adam Cole at the ROH 11th Anniversary Show.

At the event on March 2, 2013, Taven won the title after Truth Martini hit Cole in the back of the head with the Book of Truth, allowing Taven to apply his Climax finishing move, establishing himself as a heel. He successfully defended the title against Cole and Matt Hardy in a three-way match at Supercard of Honor VII on April 5, Mark Briscoe at Border Wars on May 4, and Jay Lethal and Jimmy Jacobs at Best in the World 2013 on June 22. At Death Before Dishonor XI on September 20, he, Michael Bennett and reDRagon (Bobby Fish and Kyle O'Reilly) lost to Adrenaline Rush (ACH and TaDarius Thomas) and C&C Wrestle Factory (Caprice Coleman and Cedric Alexander). At All Star Extravaganza 5 on August 3, he lost to Roderick Strong in the first round of a tournament for the vacant ROH World Championship. At Glory by Honor XII on October 26, Taven teamed with reDRagon and Cole in an eight-man elimination tag team match, where he was eliminated by Michael Elgin. He lost the title to Tommaso Ciampa at Final Battle 2013 on December 14, ending his reign at 287 days, the longest in the company's history to date; he accrued twelve defenses, the most in an individual reign.

On January 24, 2014, at Wrestling's Finest, Taven ended his alliance with Martini. Later that night, he unsuccessfully challenged Ciampa for the title in a three-way match also involving Lethal. He defeated Silas Young at the ROH 12th Anniversary Show on February 21. On Night 1 of Raising The Bar on March 7, he unsuccessfully challenged Cole for the ROH World Championship. Taven next feuded with Lethal over the ROH World Television Championship, which he failed to win in a four corner survival match also involving Ciampa and Young on May 10 at Global Wars, at Best in the World on June 22, and in a steel cage match on August 15 at Field of Honor after interference from Martini; per stipulation, he could not challenge for the title again as long as Lethal was champion. Four days later, Taven announced he would be leaving ROH after opting not to re-sign, an angle used to explain his departure.

==== The Kingdom / OGK (2014–2021) ====
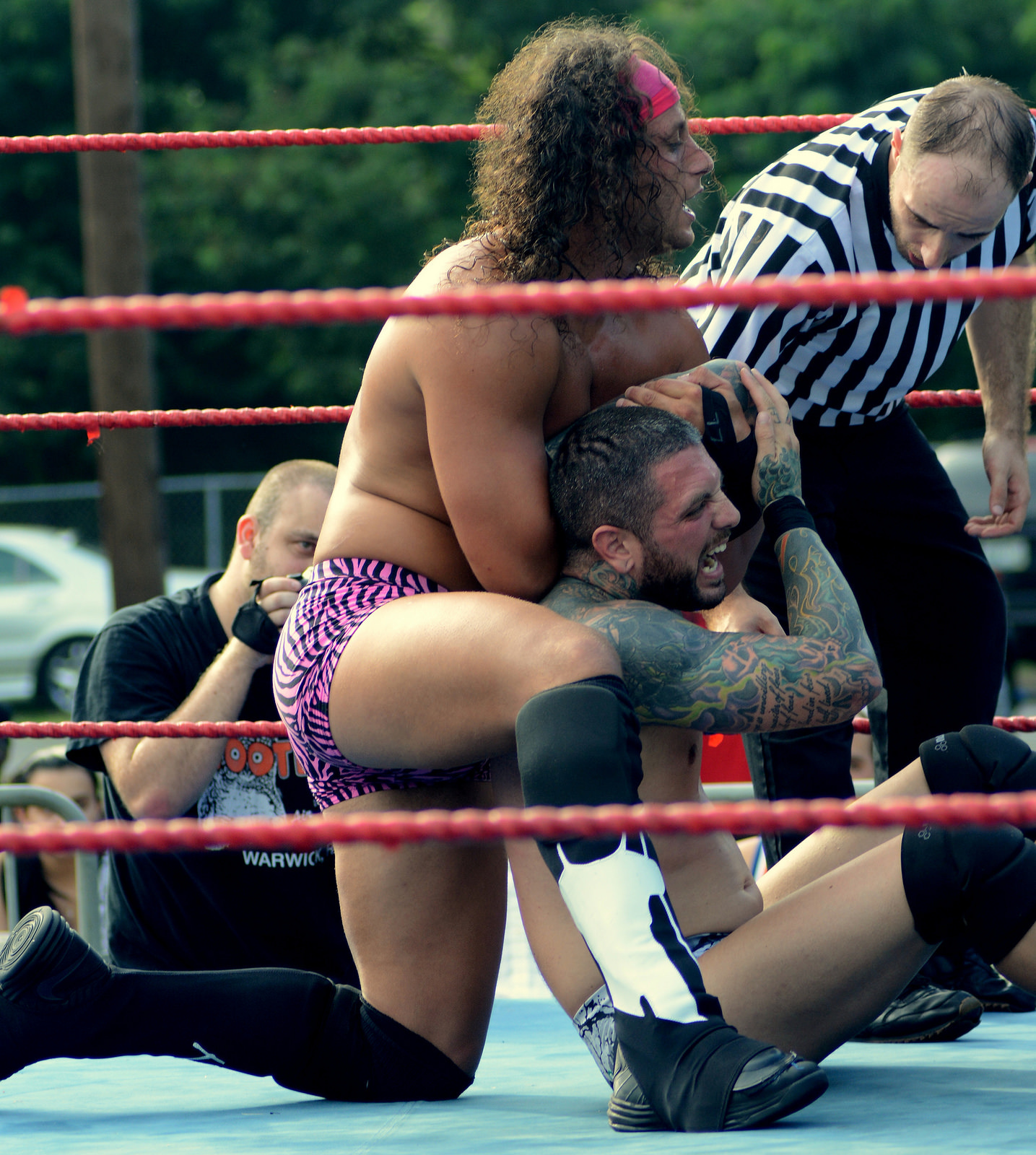
Taven wrestling Vinny Marseglia at an outdoor event in 2015

Taven returned on October 9 and formed a tag team with Bennett, known as The Kingdom. They unsuccessfully challenged reDRagon for the ROH World Tag Team Championship at Glory By Honor XIII on November 15 and at Supercard of Honor IX on March 27, 2015, but won it on September 18 at All Star Extravaganza VII, defeating The Addiction (Christopher Daniels and Frankie Kazarian) and The Young Bucks (Matt and Nick Jackson) in a three-way match. They retained the title against reDRagon on Night 1 of Survival of the Fittest on November 13, but lost it to War Machine (Hanson and Ray Rowe) on December 18 at Final Battle. Taven suffered a knee injury during the match, tearing an anterior cruciate ligament and medial meniscus and rupturing a lateral meniscus, forcing him to undergo a four-and-a-half-hour surgery on January 12, 2016; he was expected to be sidelined for nine months. Shortly after the event, Bennett left ROH, ending their partnership.

After returning from injury in September, Taven began leading a new version of The Kingdom with T. K. O'Ryan and Marseglia. They defeated Jay White, Kushida and Lio Rush in a tournament final to become the first ROH 6-Man Tag Team Champions at Final Battle on December 2. At Manhattan Mayhem on March 4, 2017, Taven won a battle royal to become the number one contender for the ROH World Championship. The Kingdom successfully defended the title against Dalton Castle and The Boys at the ROH 15th Anniversary Show on March 10, but lost it the next night to Bully Ray and The Briscoes. On Night 2 of ROH/NJPW War Of The Worlds on May 10, Taven lost his ROH World Championship match to Daniels. After defeating Will Ospreay at Final Battle on December 15, Taven began feuding with Cody in January 2018, attacking him after a loss and stealing his "Ring Of Honor". He lost to Cody at the ROH 16th Anniversary Show on March 9, but defeated him in a first blood match on April 15 at Masters of the Craft. The Kingdom regained the ROH World Six-Man Tag Team Championship on Night 1 of ROH/NJPW War of the Worlds on May 9, defeating SoCal Uncensored (Daniels, Kazarian and Scorpio Sky). At Best in the World on June 29, they successfully defended the title against Los Ingobernables de Japón (Bushi, Evil and Sanada).

Taven was part of a four corner survival match for the ROH World Championship on July 22, which was won by Lethal. On August 26, The Kingdom lost the title to Bullet Club, later known as The Elite (Cody and the Young Bucks). At Death Before Dishonor XVI on September 28, after The Kingdom attacked Ospreay and Lethal, Taven pulled out of a bag a purple copy of the Ring Of Honor World Championship, proclaiming himself as the true Ring Of Honor World Champion. At Survival of the Fittest on November 4, The Kingdom defeated The Elite for their third ROH World Six-Man Tag Team Championship. At Final Battle on December 14, Taven defeated Castle. In the main event of the ROH 17th Anniversary Show on March 15, 2019, Taven and Lethal's ROH World Championship match ended in a 60-minute time-limit draw. Shortly after, The Kingdom lost the title to Villain Enterprises (Brody King, Marty Scurll and PCO).

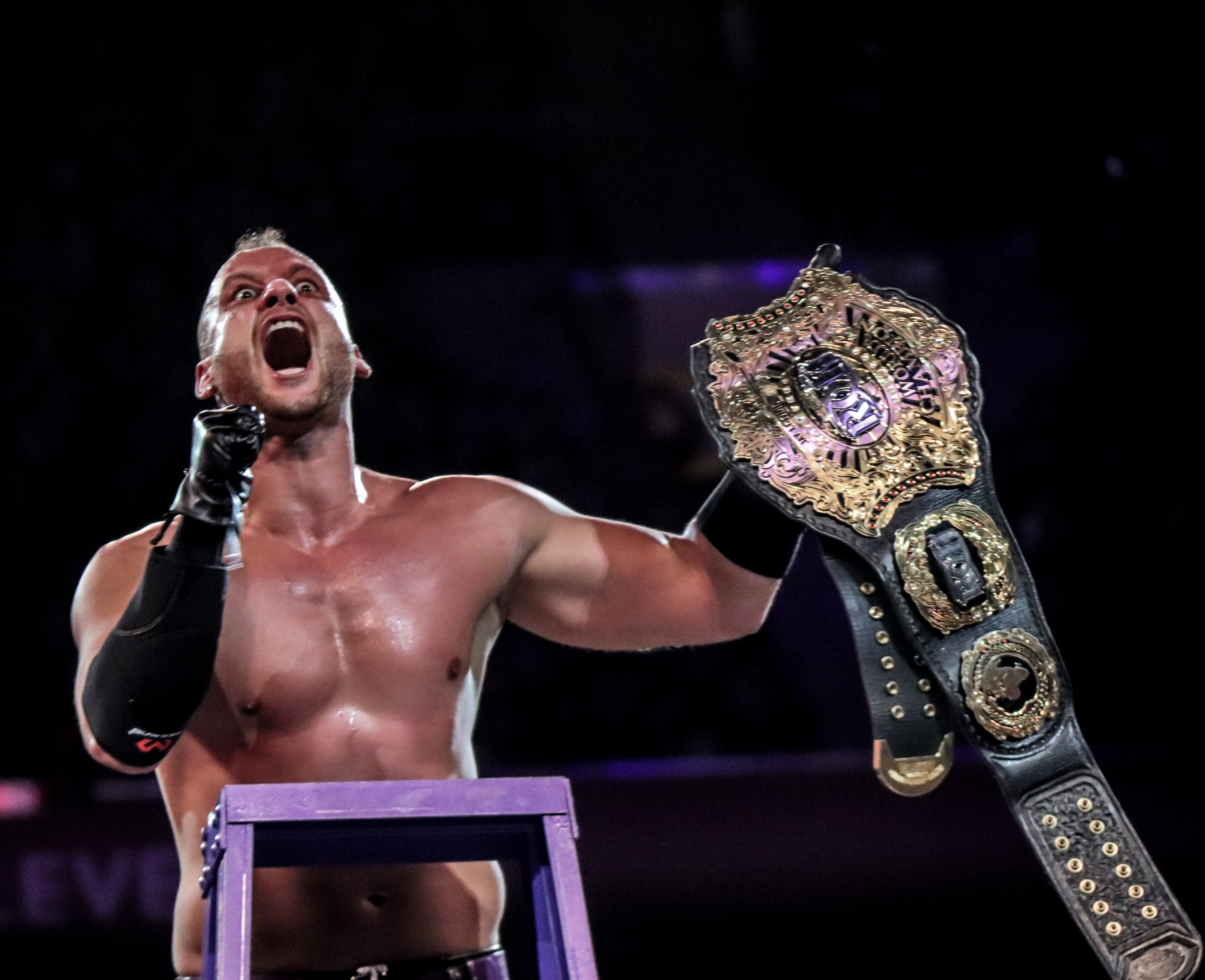
Taven after winning the ROH World Championship at G1 Supercard in April 2019

On April 6, at G1 Supercard, Taven defeated Lethal and Scurll in a ladder match to win the ROH World Championship, becoming the second ROH Grand Slam winner. His title win over the more popular Scurll has been criticized, with Larry Csonka of 411Mania calling him a "critical and financial flop". During a 411Mania podcast, Jerome Cusson said his title win "actively hurt ROH" since it was not "a draw" and Taven "wasn't over". At Masters of the Craft on April 14, The Kingdom failed to regain the ROH World Six-Man Tag Team Championship from Villain Enterprises in a Street Fight after PCO pinned Taven. Over the following months, Taven successfully defended the ROH World Championship against PCO on Night 2 of ROH/NJPW War of the Worlds on May 9, Jeff Cobb at Best in the World on June 28, Alex Shelley at Summer Supercard on August 9, and Volador Jr. on Night 2 of Global Wars Espectacular on September 7. At Death Before Dishonor on September 27, he lost the title to Rush, ending his reign at 174 days. Following the event, Marseglia (later renamed Vincent) turned on Taven. At Final Battle on December 13, he lost to Vincent who, after the match, smashed Taven's ankle with a steel chair, an angle used to write off Taven, who underwent knee surgery during the COVID-19 pandemic.

Taven returned to television in October 2020, continuing his feud with Vincent and reuniting with Bennett as the OG Kingdom (OGK). At Final Battle on December 18, they defeated Vincent and Bateman. On March 26, 2021, an unsanctioned match between Taven and Vincent at the ROH 19th Anniversary Show ended in a no contest. On Night 2 of Glory By Honor XVIII on August 21, Taven lost to Vincent in a steel cage match, ending their feud. At Honor for All on November 14, Taven and Bennett defeated La Facción Ingobernable (Dragon Lee and Kenny King) to win the ROH World Tag Team Championship for a second time, but lost it to the Briscoes at Final Battle on December 11.

=== New Japan Pro-Wrestling (2014–2015, 2019, 2024) ===
Through ROH's relationship with New Japan Pro-Wrestling (NJPW), from November 23 to December 5, 2014, Taven and Michael Bennett took part in the 2014 World Tag League. The team finished their round-robin block with a record of four wins and three losses, failing to advance to the finals. Taven and Bennett returned to NJPW on April 5, 2015, at Invasion Attack 2015, where they defeated Bullet Club (Doc Gallows and Karl Anderson) to win the IWGP Tag Team Championship. At Wrestling Dontaku 2015 on May 3, they teamed with Maria Kanellis to defeat Gallows, Anderson and Amber Gallows in a six-person intergender tag team match. On July 5, at Dominion 7.5 in Osaka-jo Hall, The Kingdom lost the IWGP Tag Team Championship back to Bullet Club in their first defense. In November, Taven and Bennett took part in the 2015 World Tag League, finishing with a record of two wins and four losses, thus failing to advance from their block.

On February 22 and 23, 2019, Taven returned to Japan as part of the ROH/NJPW co-promoted "Honor Rising" tour. On the first night, he, T. K. O'Ryan and Vinny Marseglia lost to Hiroshi Tanahashi, Jay Lethal and Kazuchika Okada. The next night, he and Marseglia lost to Los Ingobernables de Japón (Shingo Takagi and Tetsuya Naito). Taven and Bennett, as the Undisputed Kingdom, made their return to NJPW at Fighting Spirit Unleashed on November 8, 2024, where they were defeated by Los Ingobernables de Japón's Shingo Takagi and Yota Tsuji.

=== Consejo Mundial de Lucha Libre (2016–2019, 2022) ===
Through ROH's working relationship with Consejo Mundial de Lucha Libre (CMLL), Taven made his debut for the Mexican promotion on September 9, 2016, which also marked his return from a nine-month absence due to a knee injury; he teamed with Mr. Niebla and Shocker to defeat Máscara Dorada, Máximo Sexy and Volador Jr. On September 23, Taven lost to Rush in the last CMLL match of the 2016 tour. He returned to CMLL on March 17, 2017, at Homenaje a Dos Leyendas ("Homage to Two Legends"), unsuccessfully challenging Último Guerrero for the NWA World Historic Middleweight Championship. In September, Taven took part in the International Gran Prix as part of "Team International", eliminating Mephisto before being eliminated by Guerrero near the end of the tournament.

Taven again returned to CMLL at Homenaje a Dos Leyendas on March 16, 2018, where he, Atlantis and Niebla Roja defeated Los Guerreros Laguneros (Euforia, Gran Guerrero and Último Guerrero). On March 30, Taven defeated Volador Jr. to win the NWA World Historic Welterweight Championship, but lost the title in a rematch at the Negro Casas 40th Anniversary Show on August 3. Afterwards, Taven and Volador Jr. joined forces when they were both attacked by Los Ingobernables ("The Unruly"; the team of Rush and El Terrible). The storyline culminated in the main event of the CMLL 85th Anniversary Show on September 14, where Rush and Bárbaro Cavernario defeated Taven and Volador Jr. in a Lucha de Apuestas ("bet match") after Taven turned on Volador Jr., causing them both to have their hair shaved off following the match as a result. Taven, now bald, returned for the International Gran Prix tournament on October 5, where he eliminated Sansón before Volador Jr. pinned Taven 45 minutes into the match. On August 30, 2019, now the ROH World Heavyweight Champion, Taven participated in that year's International Gran Prix tournament, but was eliminated by Volador Jr. for the second year in a row.

On July 20, 2022, it was announced that Taven would return to CMLL after a nearly three-year absence to compete in that year's International Grand Prix. In the tournament on August 19, he submitted Templario before being eliminated by Último Guerrero. On December 9, Taven was paired with Hechicero in a tournament for the Copa Bicentenario ("Bicentennial Cup"), but were the first team eliminated by Volador Jr. and Lince Dorado.

=== Impact Wrestling (2022) ===
Taven made his debut for Impact Wrestling at Hard To Kill on January 8, 2022, appearing alongside Maria, Mike Bennett, PCO and Vincent as they attacked Eddie Edwards, Rich Swann, Willie Mack, Heath and Rhino, forming the stable Honor No More. They defeated Chris Sabin, Rhino, Swann, Steve Maclin and Mack at No Surrender on February 19; per stipulation, Honor No More was allowed to remain in Impact Wrestling. At Rebellion on April 23, Taven and Bennett participated in an eight-team elimination challenge for the Impact World Tag Team Championship, where they were eliminated by Heath and Rhino. On June 19, at Slammiversary, Honor No More lost to Alex Shelley, Sabin, Davey Richards, Frankie Kazarian and Nick Aldis. On the September 1 episode of Impact!, Taven and Bennett defeated The Good Brothers (Doc Gallows and Karl Anderson) for the Impact World Tag Team Championship. After successfully defending the titles against Motor City Machine Guns (Sabin and Shelley) at Bound for Glory on October 7, they lost it to Heath and Rhino on the October 20 episode of Impact!. That same month, it was reported that Taven, Bennett, Kanellis and Vincent left Impact Wrestling.

=== All Elite Wrestling / Return to ROH (2022–present) ===
The Undisputed Kingdom and Cage of Agony making their entrance at All In in August 2024

Taven made his All Elite Wrestling (AEW) debut on the October 14, 2022 episode of Rampage, alongside Mike Bennett and Maria Kanellis, interrupting FTR's victory celebration. On the October 28 episode of Rampage, Taven unsuccessfully challenged Wardlow for the AEW TNT Championship. On December 10, Taven made his return to Ring of Honor, now AEW's sister promotion, at Final Battle, where he and Bennett lost to Top Flight. At Supercard of Honor on March 31, 2023, The Kingdom competed in a "Reach for the Sky" ladder match for the vacant ROH World Tag Team Championship, which was won by the Lucha Brothers. They also failed to win the titles in a fatal four-way tag team match on July 21 at Death Before Dishonor.

On the December 27 episode of Dynamite, Taven and Bennett (wearing masks and billed as "The Devil's Masked Men") defeated MJF in a handicap match to win the ROH World Tag Team Championship for a third time. At Worlds End three days later, they revealed their identities, forming a new stable, the Undisputed Kingdom, alongside Adam Cole, Roderick Strong and Wardlow. On April 5, 2024, at Supercard of Honor, the duo successfully defended their titles against The Infantry (Carlie Bravo and Shawn Dean). At Death Before Dishonor on July 26, they successfully defended the titles against The Conglomeration (Kyle O'Reilly and Tomohiro Ishii) with help from Don Callis and Kyle Fletcher. On the August 17 episode of Collision, Bennett and Taven lost their ROH World Tag Team Championships to Dustin Rhodes and Sammy Guevara. At All In on August 25, the Undisputed Kingdom and Cage Of Agony (Bishop Kaun, Brian Cage and Toa Liona) lost to Rhodes, Katsuyori Shibata, Guevara and Marshall and Ross Von Erich. On October 3, Taven unsuccessfully challenged Mark Briscoe for the ROH World Championship. On the October 23 episode of Dynamite, Taven and the rest of the Undisputed Kingdom turned face and reignited their feud with MJF, who was now a heel. After The Undisputed Kingdom disbanded, Taven and Bennett reverted back to being a tag team in April 2025 under The Kingdom banner.

On January 5, 2026, it was reported that Taven's AEW contract had expired and was not renewed, ending his three-year tenure with the promotion. At Supercard of Honor on May 15, Taven returned to ROH with Bennett, confronting Alec Price and Jordan Oliver.

== Other media ==
In August 2025, Marinelli announced he filmed a movie for Lifetime, playing a police officer.

== Championships and accomplishments ==
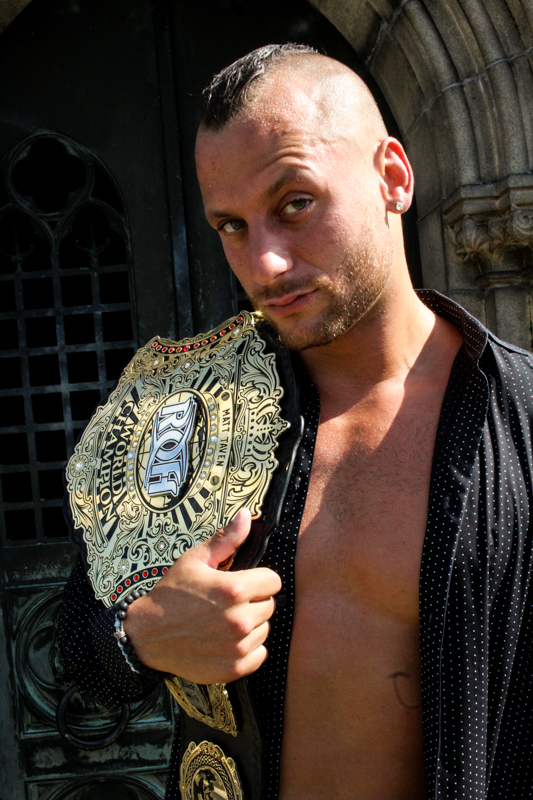
Taven is a former ROH World Champion...

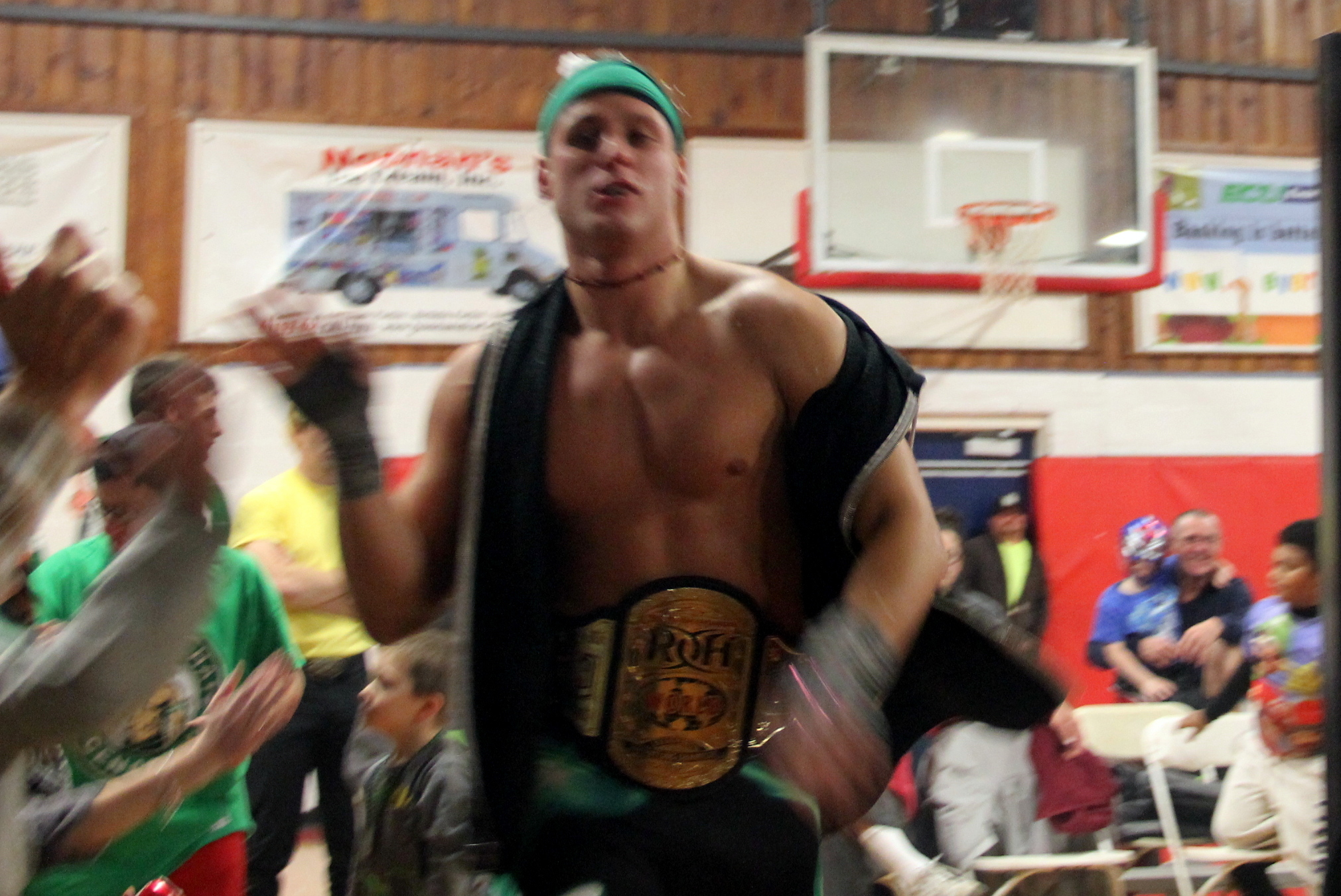
...a former ROH World Television Champion...

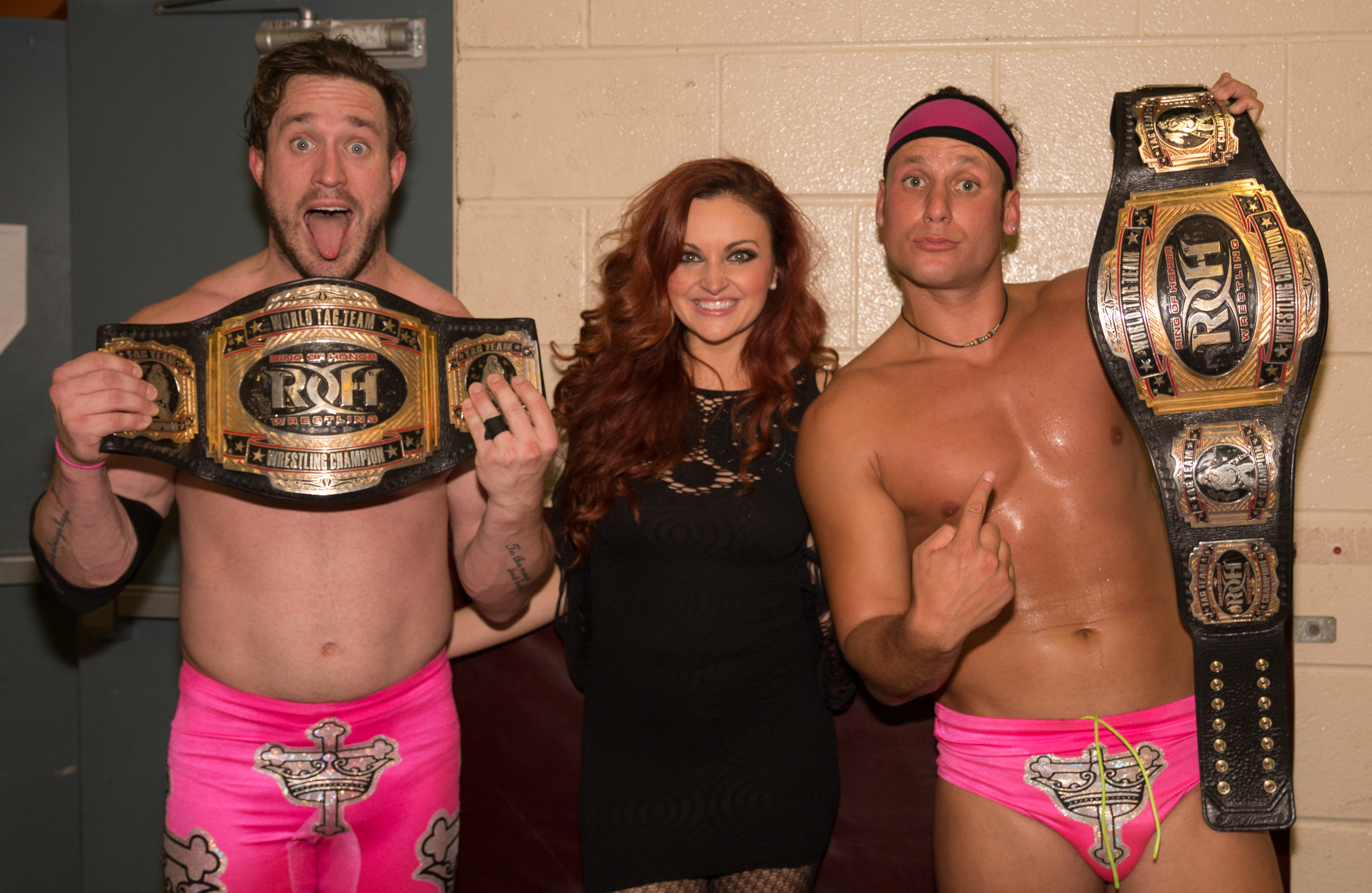
...a three-time ROH World Tag Team Champion with Michael Bennett (shown here with Maria Kanellis)...

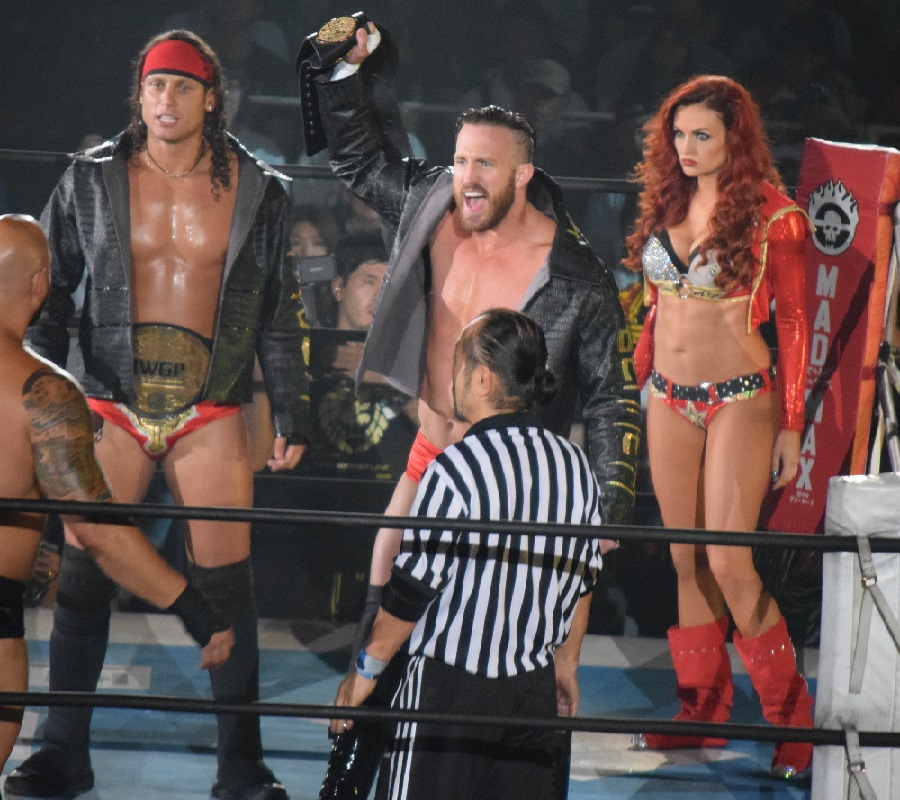
...and a former IWGP Tag Team Champion with Bennett (center - again shown with Maria Kanellis (right)

- Chaotic Wrestling
  - Chaotic Wrestling New England Championship (2 times, inaugural)
  - Chaotic Wrestling Tag Team Championship (1 time) – with Vinny Marseglia
  - Chaotic Wrestling New England Championship Tournament (2012)
- Consejo Mundial de Lucha Libre
  - NWA World Historic Welterweight Championship (1 time)
- Impact Championship Wrestling
  - ICW Tag Team Championship (1 time) – with Rhett Titus
- Impact Wrestling
  - Impact World Tag Team Championship (1 time) – with Mike Bennett
- National Wrestling Alliance
  - NWA On Fire Tag Team Championship (1 time) – with Julian Starr
- New Japan Pro-Wrestling
  - IWGP Tag Team Championship (1 time) – with Michael Bennett
- Northeast Wrestling
  - NEW Heavyweight Championship (3 times, current)
  - NEW Tag Team Championship (1 time) - with Brian Anthony
- Pro Wrestling Experience
  - Robbie Ellis Tournament of Super Juniors (2012)
- Pro Wrestling Illustrated
  - Ranked No. 37 of the top 500 singles wrestlers in the PWI 500 in 2019
- Ring of Honor
  - ROH World Championship (1 time)
  - ROH World Television Championship (1 time)
  - ROH World Tag Team Championship (3 times) – with Michael/Mike Bennett
  - ROH World Six-Man Tag Team Championship (3 times, inaugural) – with T. K. O'Ryan and Vinny Marseglia
  - Top Prospect Tournament (2013)
  - ROH World Six-Man Tag Team Championship Tournament (2016) – with T. K. O'Ryan and Vinny Marseglia
  - Fifth Triple Crown Champion
  - Second Grand Slam Champion
  - ROH Year-End Award (2 times)
    - Match of the Year (2019) vs. Jay Lethal and Marty Scurll at G1 Supercard
    - Wrestler of the Year (2019)
- The Wrestling Revolver
  - Revolver World Tag Team Championship (1 time) – with Mike Bennett
- Top Rope Promotions
  - TRP Heavyweight Championship (2 times)
  - Killer Kowalski Cup (2010)

== Luchas de Apuestas record ==
Winner (wager)	Loser (wager)	Location	Event	Date	Notes
Bárbaro Cavernario and Rush (hair)	Matt Taven and Volador Jr. (hair)	Mexico City, Mexico	CMLL 85th Anniversary Show	September 14, 2018	
