= CMLL International Gran Prix (2017) =

Mexican professional wrestling tournament

CMLL International Gran Prix 2017
- Official poster for the tournament
- Promotion(s): Consejo Mundial de Lucha Libre; New Japan Pro-Wrestling; Ring of Honor
- Date: September 1, 2017
- City: Mexico City
- Venue: Arena Mexico

Pay-per-view chronology
← Previous; Universal Championship	Next → CMLL 84th Anniversary Show

International Gran Prix chronology
← Previous; 2016	Next → 2018

The CMLL International Gran Prix (2017) was a lucha libre, or professional wrestling, tournament produced and scripted by the Mexican professional wrestling promotion Consejo Mundial de Lucha Libre (CMLL; "World Wrestling Council" in Spanish) that took place on September 1, 2017 in Arena México, Mexico City, Mexico, CMLL's main venue. The 2017 International Gran Prix was the thirteenth time CMLL held an International Gran Prix tournament since 1994. All International Gran Prix tournaments have been a one-night tournament, always as part of CMLL's Friday night CMLL Super Viernes shows. The event was available as an internet pay per view (iPPV) both in and outside of Mexico.

The main event of the show was a sixteen-man torneo cibernetico elimination match, where "Team Mexico" (Valiente, Rush, Volador Jr., Euforia, Dragon Lee, Diamante Azul, Mephisto and Último Guerrero) faced off against "Team International" (Michael Elgin, Marco Corleone, Johnny Idol, Juice Robinson, Sam Adonis, Satoshi Kojima, Matt Taven and Kenny King). As in previous years, the "international" side has consisted of a combination of non-Mexican wrestlers who already worked for CMLL and foreign wrestlers brought in specifically for the tournament.

== Production ==
=== Background ===
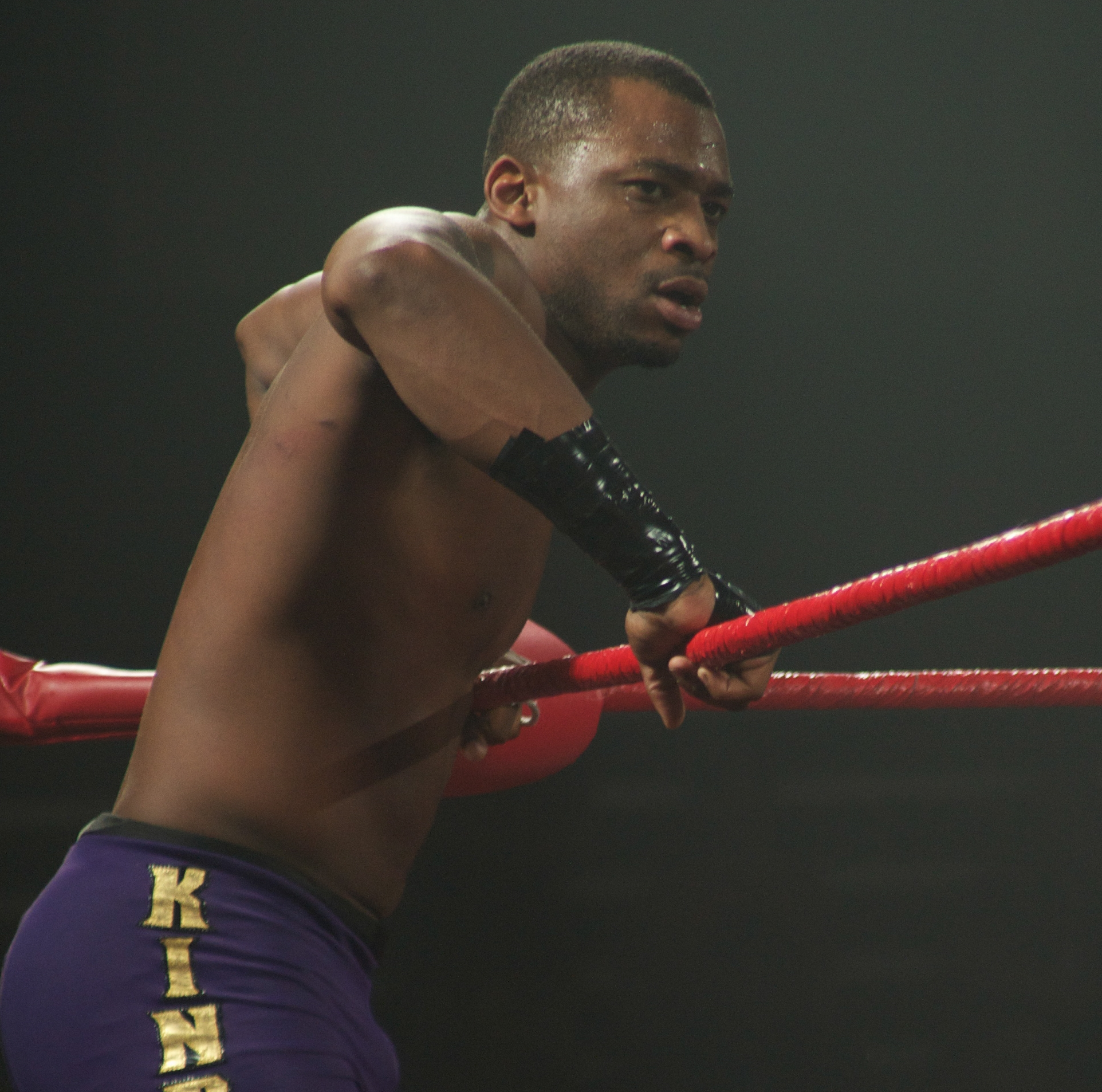
Kenny King, who made his first ever appearance in CMLL as a part of the Gran Prix

In 1994, the Mexican professional wrestling promotion Consejo Mundial de Lucha Libre created the International Gran Prix tournament which took place on April 15 that saw Rayo de Jalisco Jr. defeat King Haku to win the tournament. the tournament became annual tournament but after the 1998 tournament, the tournament became inactive. in 2002, the tournament returned with new rules. (Mexico and International group vs another Mexican and International group and then Mexicans vs Japanese and finally Mexico vs International) the 2017 tournament will be 12'th in the series.

=== Feuds ===
During a press conference, CMLL announced "Team International" as Marco Corleone, Juice Robinson, Kenny King, Satoshi Kojima, Johnny Idol, Michael Elgin, Sam Adonis and Matt Taven while "Team Mexico" as Rush, Diamante Azul, Último Guerrero, Valiente, Dragon Lee, Euforia, Volador Jr. and Mephisto and other information including it would be a special Super Viernes show and saw a Torneo Cibernetico during a Guadalajara show that featured Michael Elgin picking up the win for "Team Resto del Mundo" by pinning Volador Jr., which would be noted as a "preview of the Gran Prix" and with Marco Corleone being noted as "Extranjero" (Foreigner), he started acting more like a rudo including (along with Robinson and Taven) attacking KeMonito during a match and Taven stealing Azul's mask along with other "Extranjeros" attacking the rest of Team Mexico.

On August 9, 2017, CMLL announced that Kenny King would replace King Haku because of immigration complications.

== Results ==
No.	Results	Stipulations
1	Mascara Año 2000, Cuatrero and Sansón defeated The Panther, Blue Panther Jr. and Blue Panther	Six-Man "Lucha Libre Rules" Tag Team match
2	Zeuxis, La Amapola and Dalys la Caribeña defeated Princesa Sugehit, Marcela and Silueta	Six-Women "Lucha Libre Rules" Tag Team match
3	Mistico, Soberano Jr. and Carístico defeated La Peste Negra (Negro Casas, Barbaro Cavernario and El Felino)	Six-Man "Lucha Libre Rules" Tag Team match
4	Diamante Azul defeated Michael Elgin to win the match for "Team Mexico"; Also in the match: Team International (Marco Corleone, Johnny Idol, Juice Robinson, Sam Adonis, Satoshi Kojima, Matt Taven and Kenny King) and Team Mexico (El Valiente, Rush, Volador Jr., Euforia, Dragon Lee, Mephisto and Último Guerrero)	International Gran Prix 16-man Torneo Cibernetico
