= CMLL International Gran Prix (2018) =

Mexican professional wrestling show and tournament

- Official poster for the event
- Promotion(s): Consejo Mundial de Lucha Libre; New Japan Pro-Wrestling; Ring of Honor
- Date: October 5, 2018
- City: Mexico City
- Venue: Arena Mexico

Pay-per-view chronology
← Previous; CMLL 85th Anniversary Show	Next → Blue Panther 40th Anniversary Show

International Gran Prix chronology
← Previous; 2017	Next → 2019

The CMLL International Gran Prix (2018) is a lucha libre, or professional wrestling, tournament produced and scripted by the Mexican professional wrestling promotion Consejo Mundial de Lucha Libre (CMLL; "World Wrestling Council" in Spanish) which took place on October 5, 2018 in Arena México, Mexico City, Mexico, CMLL's main venue. The 2018 International Gran Prix was the fourteenth time CMLL held an International Gran Prix tournament since 1994. All International Gran Prix tournaments have been a one-night tournament, always as part of CMLL's Friday night CMLL Super Viernes shows. The event was available as an internet pay-per-view (iPPV).

For the 2018 tournament CMLL brought in representatives of Ring of Honor (Matt Taven, The Briscoe Brothers: Jay and Mark, and Flip Gordon), representatives of New Japan Pro-Wrestling (Michael Elgin and David Finlay), both promotions that CMLL has a close working relationship with. Team International also includes CMLL regular Okumura and independent wrestlers Dark Magic and Gilbert el Boricua. The Mexican contingent includes the 2017 tournament winner Diamante Azul, Carístico, El Cuatrero, Euforia, Hechicero, Sansón, El Terrible, Último Guerrero, and Volador Jr. In the end Michael Elgin eliminated Último Guerrero to win the tournament, marking the first time a non-Mexican team won the Gran Prix since it was revived in 2016.

== Production ==
=== Background ===
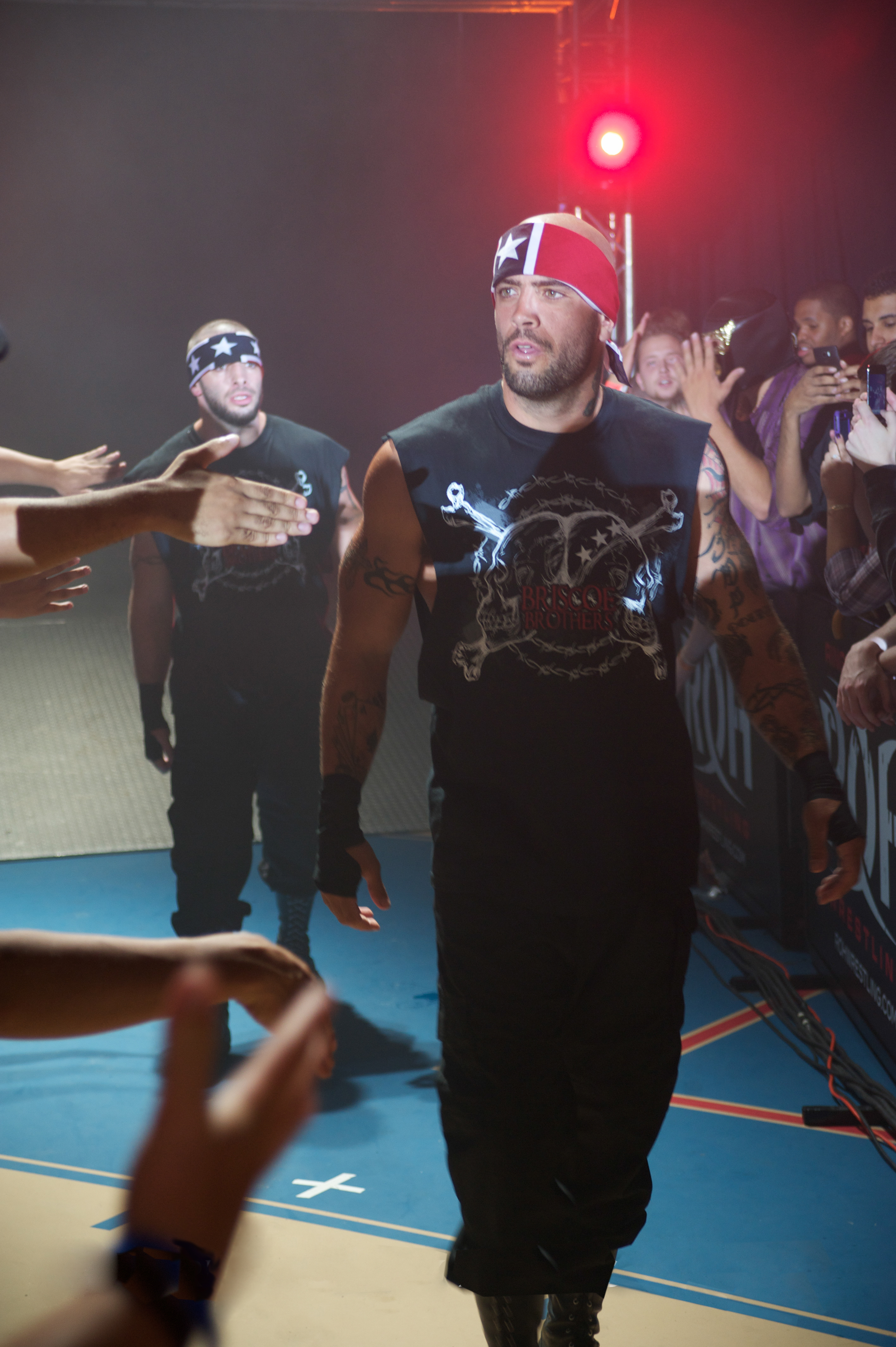
The Briscoe Brothers (Mark (left) and Jay (right)), representing Ring of Honor in the 2018 Gran Prix

In 1994, the Mexican professional wrestling promotion Consejo Mundial de Lucha Libre created the International Gran Prix tournament which took place on April 15 that saw Rayo de Jalisco Jr. defeat King Haku to win the tournament. the tournament became annual tournament but after the 1998 tournament, the tournament became inactive. in 2002, the tournament returned with new rules. (Mexico and International group vs another Mexican and International group and then Mexicans vs Japanese and finally Mexico vs International) the 2018 tournament will be 14th in the series. The tournament traditionally sees a team of 8 Mexican born CMLL wrestlers face off against 8 foreign-born wrestlers, although for 2018 the teams were expanded to 9 members on each side.

=== Storylines ===
The 2018 Gran Prix show will feature an undisclosed number of professional wrestling matches scripted by CMLL with some wrestlers involved in scripted feuds. The wrestlers portray either heels (referred to as rudos in Mexico, those that play the part of the "bad guys") or faces (técnicos in Mexico, the "good guy" characters) as they perform.

Team Resto del Mundo

- Matt Taven (USA, Ring of Honor)
- Jay Briscoe (USA, Ring of Honor)
- Mark Briscoe (USA, Ring of Honor)
- Dark Magic (USA, Independent Circuit)
- Michael Elgin (Canada, New Japan Pro-Wrestling)
- Davis Finlay (Germany, New Japan Pro-Wrestling)
- Gilbert el Boricua (Puerto Rico, Independent Circuit)
- Flip Gordon (USA, Ring of Honor)
- Okumura (Japan, Consejo Mundial de Lucha Libre)

Team Mexico

- El Cuatrero
- Diamante Azul
- Sansón
- Último Guerrero
- Carístico
- Euforia
- Hechicero
- El Terrible
- Volador Jr.

== Results ==
No.	Results	Stipulations	Times
1	Akuma, Camorra and Star Jr. defeated El Hijo del Signo, Robin and Yago	Relevos increíbles match	14:03
2	Avispa Dorada, La Jarochita, and Marcela defeated Dalys la Caribeña, La Metálica and Reyna Isis	Six-woman "Lucha Libre rules" tag team match	09:53
3	Gran Guerrero defeated Valiente	Lightning match (One fall, 10 minute time limit)	09:10
4	El Hijo de L.A. Park, L.A. Park and Místico defeated Bárbaro Cavernario and the Cl4n (Ciber the Main Man and The Chris)	Six-man "Lucha Libre rules" tag team match	17:06
5	Michael Elgin won the 2018 Gran Prix; Resto del Mundo (Matt Taven, Jay Briscoe, Mark Briscoe, Dark Magic, Michael Elgin, David Finlay, Gilbert el Boricua, Flip Gordon and Okumura) defeated Team Mexico (Diamante Azul, Carístico, El Cuatrero, Euforia, Hechicero, Sansón, El Terrible, Último Guerrero, and Volador Jr.)	2018 International Gran Prix, 18-man torneo cibernetico elimination match	59:57

=== International Gran Prix order of elimination ===
#	Eliminated	Eliminated by	Time
1	Okumura	Sansón	17:00
2	El Cuatrero	Jay and Mark Briscoe	19:57
3	Black Magic	Hechicero	23:05
4	Diamante Azul	Michael Elgin	26:34
5	David Finlay	Carístico	29:40
6	Sansón	Matt Taven	34:12
7	Flip Gordon	El Terrible	35:21
8	El Terrible	Jay Briscoe	36:06
9	Jay Briscoe	Último Guerrero	36:25
10	Mark Briscoe	Carístico	37:23
11	Carístico	Mark Briscoe	37:23
12	Hechicero	Gilbert el Boricua	40:23
13	Matt Taven	Volador Jr.	45:07
14	Volador Jr.	Gilberg el Boricua	47:28
15	Gilbert el Boricua	Euforia	50:57
16	Euforia	Michael Elgin	55:35
17	Último Guerrero	Michael Elgin	59:57
18	Winner	Michael Elgin	59:57
