= Michael Elgin =

Canadian-American professional wrestler and promoter

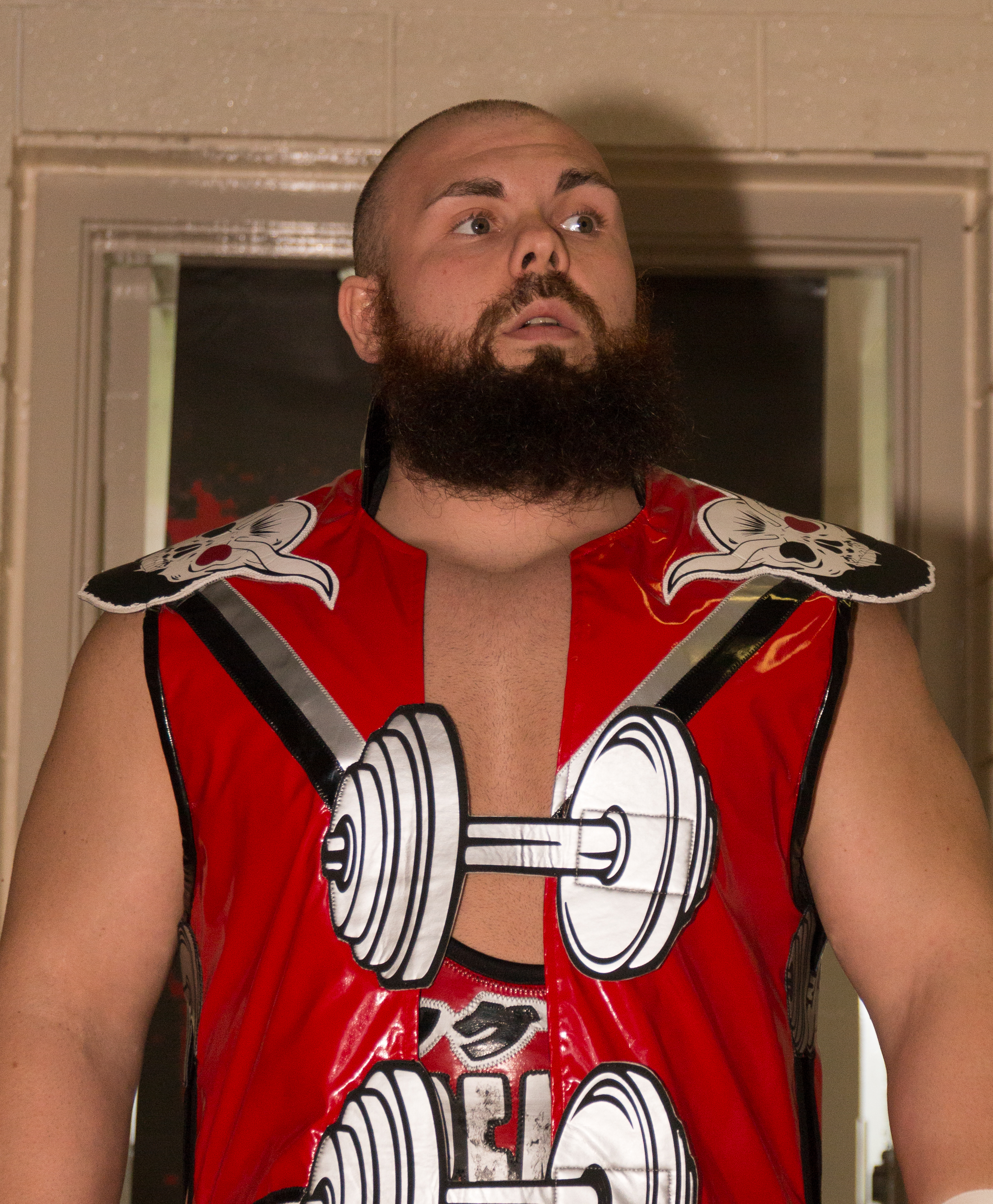
- Elgin in 2016

Personal information
- Born: Aaron Michael Frobel; December 13, 1986 (age 39) Oshawa, Ontario, Canada
- Spouse: MsChif (m. 2013; div. 2020)
- Children: 1

Professional wrestling career
- Ring name(s): Michael Elgin; Mike
- Billed height: 5 ft 11 in (1.80 m)
- Billed weight: 267 lb (121 kg)
- Billed from: Toronto, Ontario; Oshawa, Ontario
- Trained by: Joe E. Legend; Rob Fuego; Tyson Dux
- Debut: 2004
- Retired: February 5, 2024

Aaron Michael Frobel (born December 13, 1986) is a Canadian-American retired professional wrestler and promoter, better known by his ring name Michael Elgin. He is known for his work with New Japan Pro-Wrestling (NJPW), where he was a one-time IWGP Intercontinental Champion, a one-time NEVER Openweight Champion and a one-time NEVER Openweight 6-Man Tag Team Champion. He is also known for his work in Ring of Honor (ROH), where he is a one-time ROH World Champion. He has also previous worked for the Southern California-based company Pro Wrestling Guerrilla, where he is a one-time PWG World Tag Team Champion with Brian Cage and Japanese company Pro Wrestling Noah, where he was a former one-time GHC Tag Team Champion with Masa Kitamiya.

Frobel debuted in late 2004 using his ring name Michael Elgin, and by the age of 18, he was a regular on the independent circuit. He has competed for promotions including Combat Zone Wrestling, World League Wrestling, Alpha-1 Wrestling, and the Independent Wrestling Association Mid-South, where he won the IWA Mid-South Strong Style Championship in 2008. Elgin first appeared for Ring of Honor in 2007. He started competing regularly in 2010 as part of the House of Truth and signed a contract with the company in 2011. That November, Elgin won the 2011 Survival of the Fittest tournament. In 2015, Elgin won the 2015 Survival of the Fittest tournament and became the first wrestler to win the tournament twice. In 2015, Elgin made his debut for NJPW, signing a contract with the promotion the following year. After three years with the promotion, Elgin left New Japan Pro-Wrestling in March 2019 and signed with Impact Wrestling the following month. In June 2020, Impact released Elgin after allegations were made against him during the Speaking Out movement.

== Professional wrestling career ==
=== Training and early career ===
Frobel had begun training at a wrestling school at the age of 14. He later moved to training at Squared Circle Training in Toronto, Ontario, Canada under Rob Fuego in early 2004.

In late 2004, Frobel made his professional wrestling debut in Hamtramck, Michigan using the ring name Michael Elgin. By the age of 16, Frobel, as Elgin, was a regular competitor on the independent circuit. The Ontario Athletic Commission did not allow people under the age of 18 to wrestle professionally in the area, so Frobel travelled to Montreal, as well as to the United States to wrestle in the states of Michigan, Ohio, and Indiana.

=== Independent promotions (2005–2010) ===
Frobel, as Elgin, has been a mainstay in several independent promotions, both in the United States and Canada, since 2005.

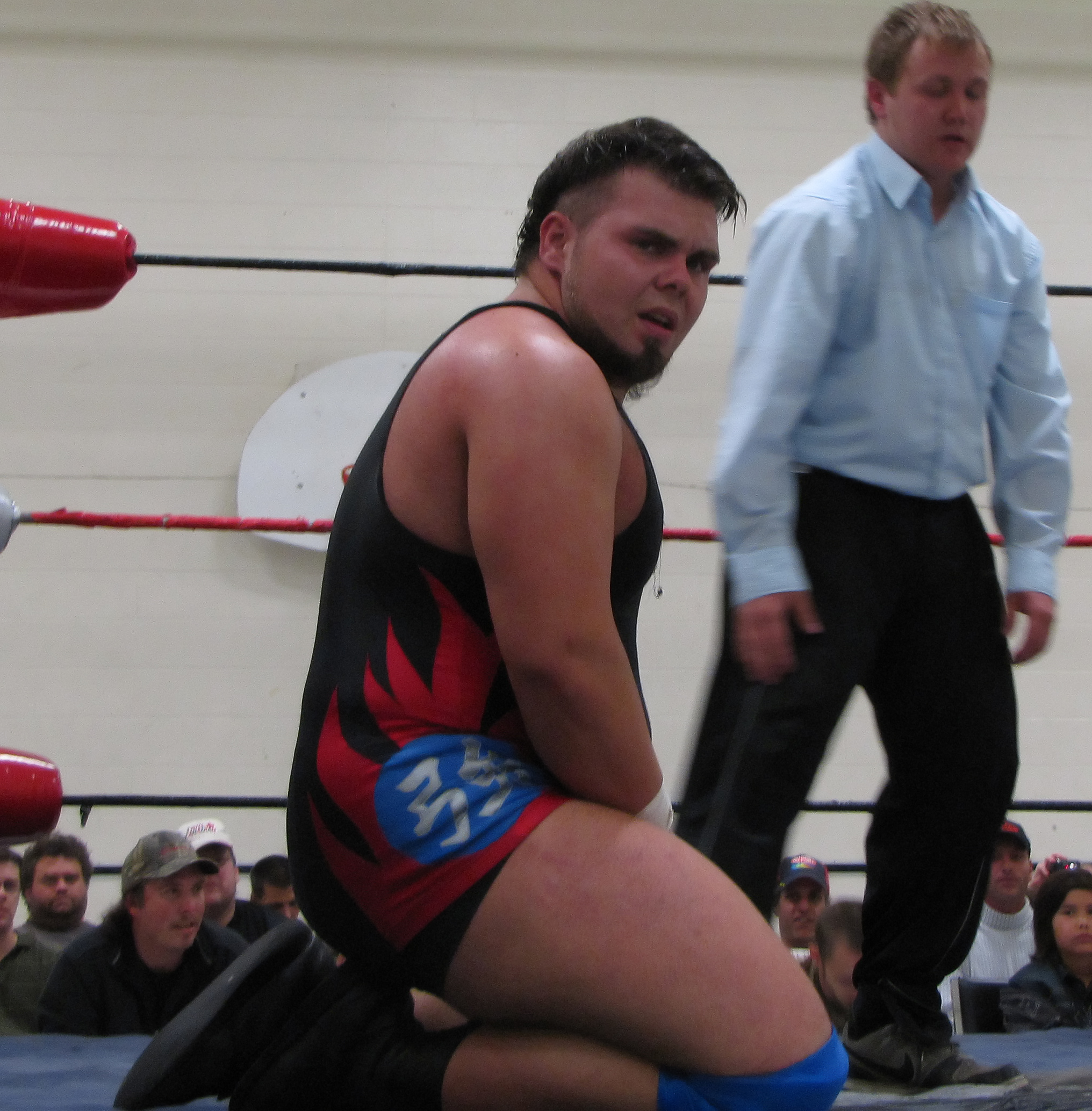
Elgin at an independent show in 2009

He has wrestled for the Combat Zone Wrestling and Independent Wrestling Association Mid-South (IWA Mid-South), where he won the IWA Mid-South Strong Style Championship. Frobel attended a World Wrestling Entertainment (WWE) tryout camp in mid-2010. Elgin also wrestled for the canadian promotion Great Canadian Wrestling, where he won the GCW National championship twice and the Tag Team Championship four times.

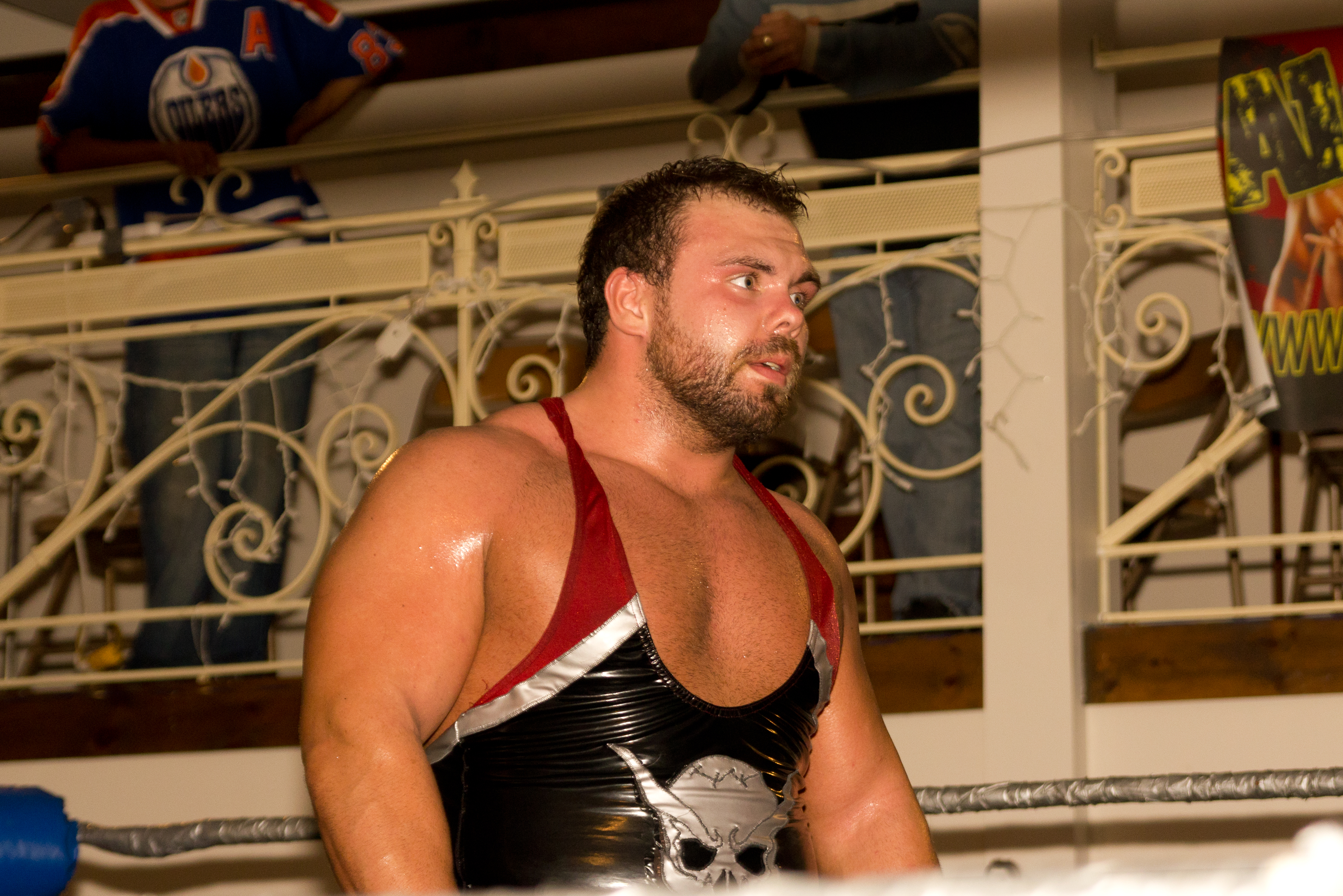
Elgin in 2011

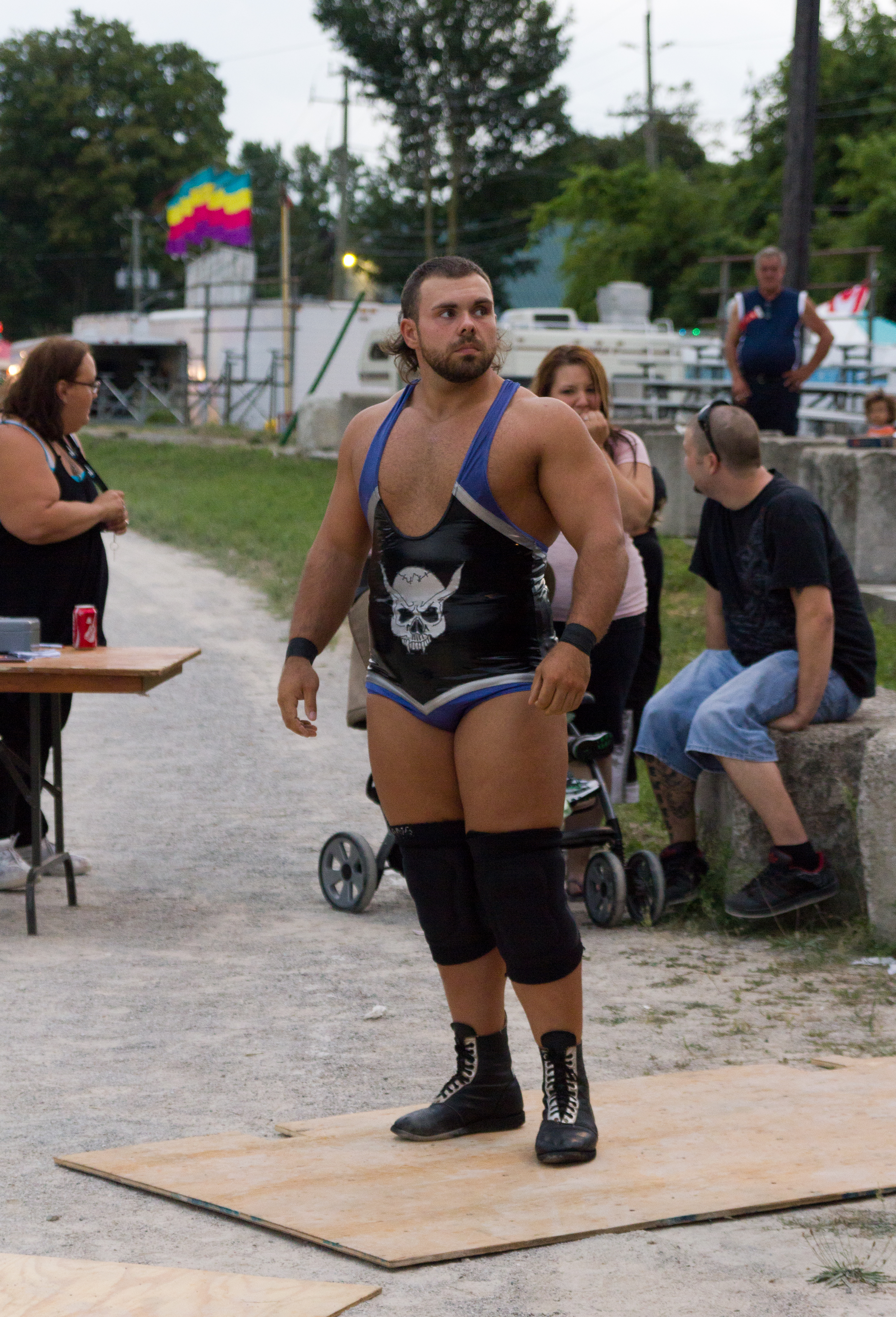
Elgin in 2011

=== Ring of Honor (2007, 2008, 2010–2016) ===
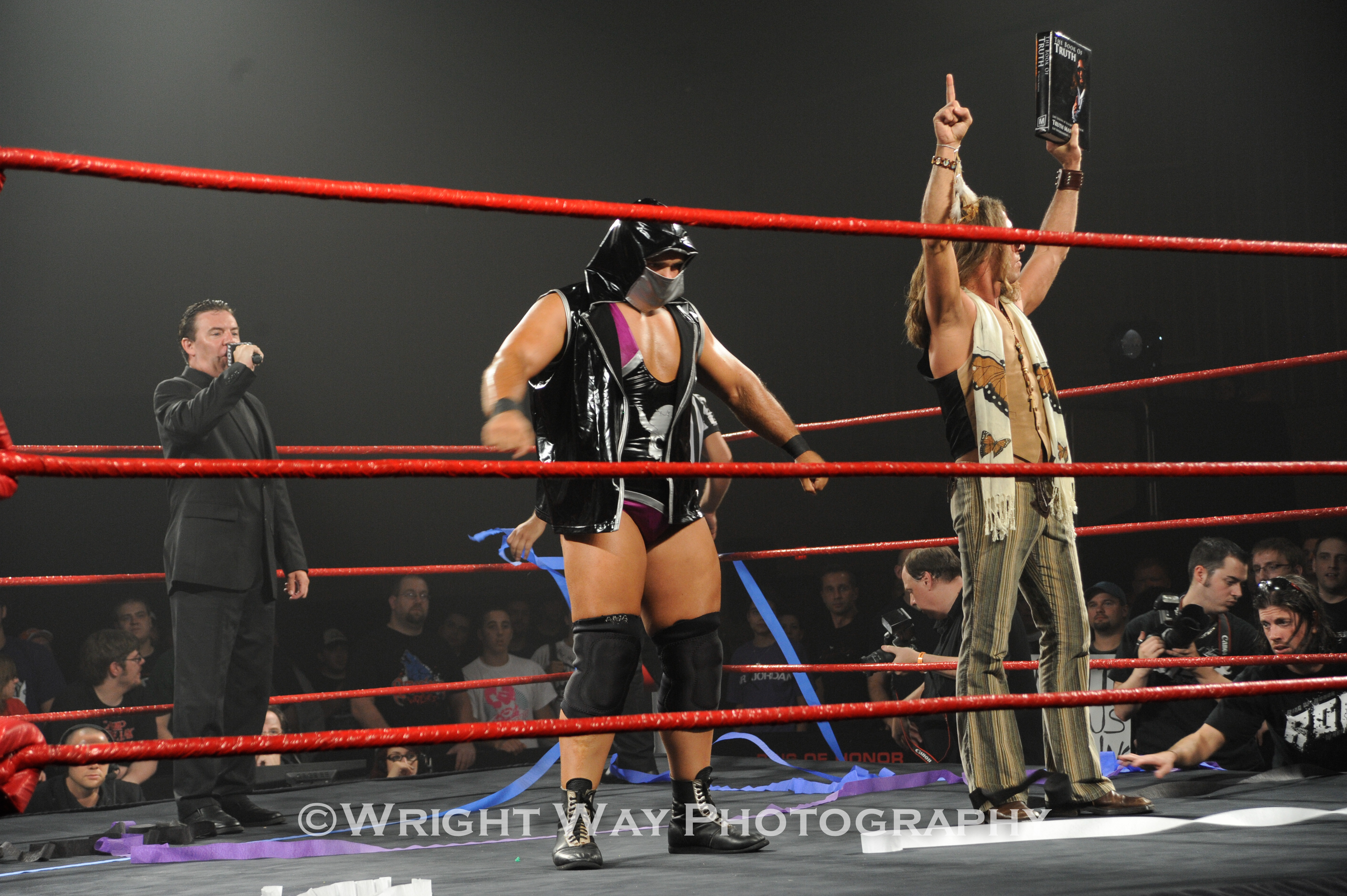
Elgin (center) with his manager Truth Martini at a Ring of Honor show in 2011

Frobel had his first tryout match with Ring of Honor (ROH) in 2007, and made appearances in 2007 and 2008. In 2010, Elgin appeared at Survival of the Fittest 2010, where he was presented as part of the House of Truth faction led by Truth Martini. As part of the stable, Elgin feuded with Christopher Daniels and El Generico. He signed a contract with ROH on March 19, 2011, tying him to the company through December 2012.

Elgin appeared at both days of the Honor Takes Center Stage pay-per-view, defeating Generico on night one, before losing to Daniels on night two.

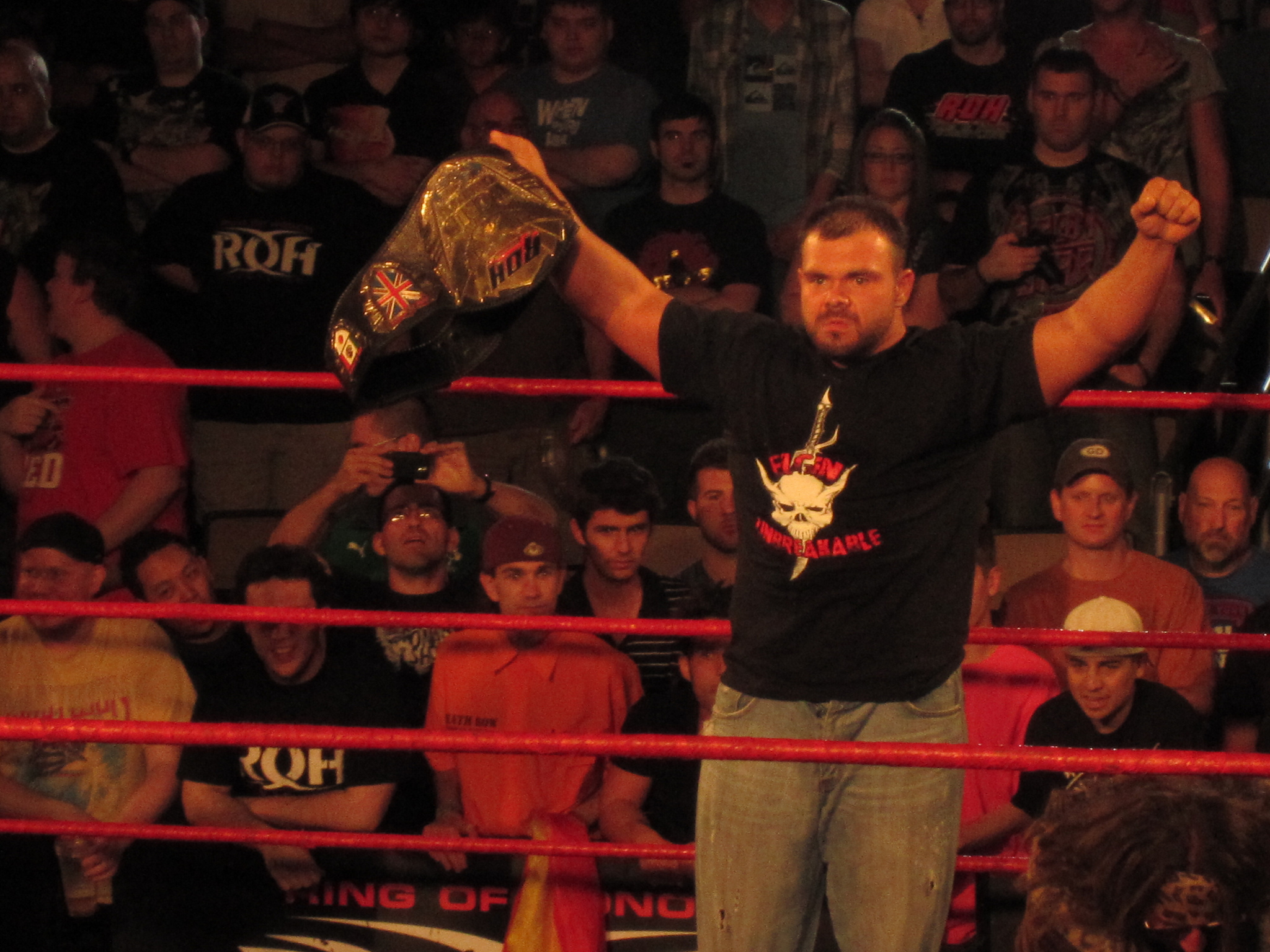
Elgin earned a five-star rating for his match against Davey Richards for the ROH World Championship.

On November 18, Elgin won the 2011 Survival of the Fittest tournament. He won a four-corner survival match against Kenny King, Adam Cole, and Tommaso Ciampa to advance to the tournament final, a six-man elimination match, in which he last eliminated Kyle O'Reilly to win the tournament and a guaranteed ROH World Championship match. At the Showdown in the Sun pay-per-view on March 31, 2012, Elgin unsuccessfully challenged Davey Richards for the ROH World Championship. Elgin later defeated fellow break-out star Adam Cole at Border Wars, in his hometown of Toronto. On July 20, ROH announced that Elgin had signed a long-term contract extension with the promotion. After months of teasing dissension between Elgin and the rest of the House of Truth, Elgin finally turned on the faction on September 16 at Death Before Dishonor X: State of Emergency by attacking Roderick Strong. At the following internet pay-per-view, Glory By Honor XI: The Unbreakable Hope on October 13, Elgin unsuccessfully challenged Kevin Steen for the ROH World Championship. After the match, Elgin was attacked by Roderick Strong. The attack led to a match on December 16 at Final Battle 2012: Doomsday, where Elgin was defeated by Strong, following interference from Truth Martini. On March 2, 2013, at the 11th Anniversary Show, Elgin defeated Strong in a two out of three falls match, during which Martini was banned from ringside. On April 6, at Supercard of Honor VII, Elgin defeated Jay Lethal to become the number one contender to the ROH World Championship. Before Elgin got his title shot however, the ROH World Championship was vacated and he was entered in the tournament to determine the new champion. In August, Elgin defeated Paul London and Karl Anderson to advance to the semifinals of the tournament. The following month, at Death Before Dishonor XI, Elgin defeated Kevin Steen to make it to the finals of the tournament, where he was defeated by Adam Cole. On October 26 at Glory By Honor XII, Elgin earned himself another shot at the ROH World Championship by pinning Cole to win a four-on-four elimination tag team match between ROH's champions and their top contenders. Elgin received his title shot on December 14 at Final Battle 2013, but was defeated by Cole in a three-way match, which also included Jay Briscoe. In May 2014, Elgin took part in a tour co-produced by ROH and New Japan Pro-Wrestling (NJPW). On May 17 at War of the Worlds, Elgin unsuccessfully challenged A.J. Styles for NJPW's top title, the IWGP Heavyweight Championship, in a three-way match, which also included Kazuchika Okada.

Elgin continued to feud with Adam Cole over the ROH World Championship; the storyline saw Cole attack Elgin and cut off his hair, before expanding to include Elgin's real-life wife MsChif, who Cole also attacked. On June 22 at Best in the World 2014, Elgin defeated Cole to become the new ROH World Champion. Elgin would go on to defend the title seven times before losing it to Jay Briscoe on September 6 at All Star Extravaganza 6, ending his reign as ROH World Champion at 76 days. The following day it was reported that behind the scenes Elgin had not only fallen out of favor with ROH management, but was for the moment also unable to get out of Canada due to a work visa issue.

On October 6, ROH announced that Elgin was returning to the promotion the following weekend. However, just hours later, Elgin quit the promotion on Twitter, claiming that ROH had promoted him for an event he was not going to appear at. Elgin returned to ROH as a villain with a new, disgruntled character on October 25, first walking out on an interview with Kevin Kelly and then refusing to wrestle Caprice Coleman. On November 7, 2015, it was reported that Elgin had signed a new deal with ROH. In November 2015, Elgin participated in the 2015 Survival of the Fittest tournament, which he won after pinning Jay Briscoe in the finals. Elgin became the first wrestler to win the tournament twice. On December 15, 2016, Elgin announced that outside of joint shows with NJPW, he would no longer be working for ROH.

=== Pro Wrestling Guerrilla (2012–2017) ===
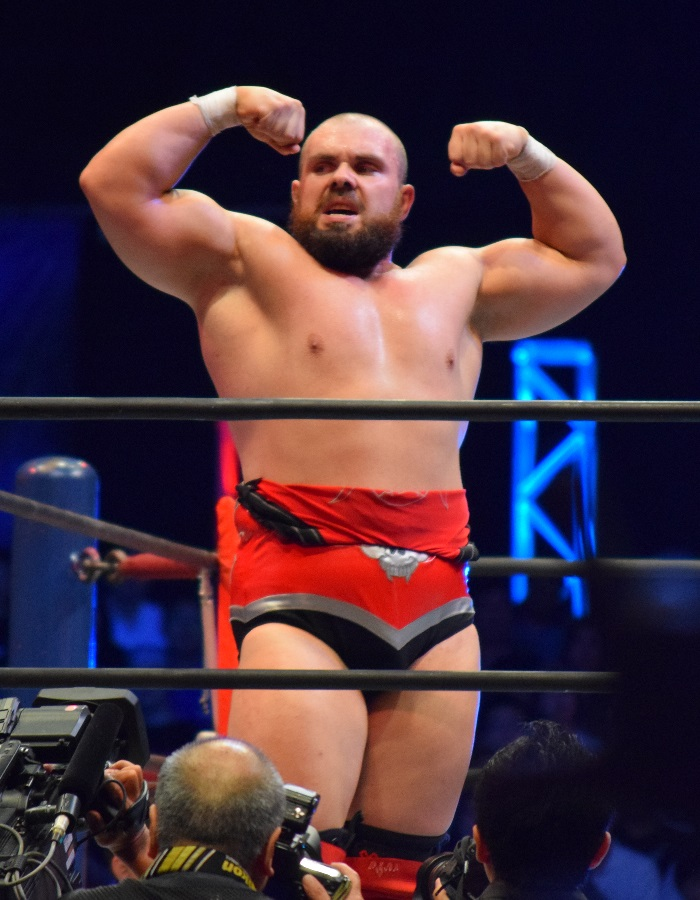
Elgin in August 2015

On May 25, 2012, Elgin made his debut for Pro Wrestling Guerrilla, losing to Willie Mack. On July 21 at Threemendous III, PWG's nine-year anniversary event, Elgin defeated Sami Callihan for his first win in the promotion. On September 1, Elgin entered the 2012 Battle of Los Angeles, defeating Davey Richards in his opening round match. The following day, Elgin first defeated Brian Cage in the quarterfinal round, then Ricochet in the semifinal, before losing to Adam Cole in the final round of the tournament. On October 27 at Failure to Communicate, Elgin unsuccessfully challenged Kevin Steen for the PWG World Championship in a three-way match, which also included Ricochet.

On January 12, 2013, Elgin and Brian Cage formed a tag team called the Unbreakable F'n Machines (a name derived from both wrestlers' nicknames) and participated in the 2013 Dynamite Duumvirate Tag Team Title Tournament. In the opening round, they captured the PWG World Tag Team Championship by beating the previous year's winners, the Super Smash Bros. (Player Uno and Stupefied). The Unbreakable F'n Machines then lost the championship to The Young Bucks (Matt and Nick Jackson) in the semifinal round of the tournament later that same day. On August 30, Elgin entered the 2013 Battle of Los Angeles, defeating Rich Swann in his first round match. The following day, Elgin first defeated Roderick Strong and then Johnny Gargano to advance to the finals of the tournament, where he was defeated by Kyle O'Reilly.

=== New Japan Pro-Wrestling (2015–2019) ===
==== Intercontinental Champion (2015–2016) ====
Through ROH's working relationship with NJPW, Elgin made his debut for the Japanese promotion by taking part in the 2015 G1 Climax between July 23 and August 15. He finished his tournament with a record of four wins and five losses, failing to advance from his block. Elgin quickly became popular among Japanese crowds and his performance in the tournament was called a "career resurgence". In November, it was announced he would team with Hiroshi Tanahashi in the 2015 World Tag League. They finished the tournament with a record of four wins and two losses, narrowly missing the finals due to losing to block winners Togi Makabe and Tomoaki Honma in the head-to-head match.

On January 4, 2016, at Wrestle Kingdom 10 in Tokyo Dome, Elgin unsuccessfully challenged Jay Lethal for the ROH World Championship. On February 20, it was reported that Elgin had signed a two-year deal with NJPW. This was confirmed by NJPW on March 3. In his first tour under a NJPW contract, Elgin made it to the semifinals of the 2016 New Japan Cup, before losing to Hirooki Goto. On March 20, Elgin received his first title shot in NJPW, when he, Hiroshi Tanahashi and Juice Robinson unsuccessfully challenged The Elite (Kenny Omega and The Young Bucks) for the NEVER Openweight 6-Man Tag Team Championship.

On April 10 at Invasion Attack 2016, Elgin won his first title in NJPW, when he, Tanahashi and Yoshitatsu defeated The Elite to become the new NEVER Openweight 6-Man Tag Team Champions. They made their first successful defense on April 23 against Bad Luck Fale, Kenny Omega and Yujiro Takahashi. Four days later, Elgin unsuccessfully challenged Omega for the IWGP Intercontinental Championship. This marked the first time two Canadians had main evented a NJPW show. On May 3 at Wrestling Dontaku 2016, Elgin, Tanahashi and Yoshitatsu lost the NEVER Openweight 6-Man Tag Team Championship back to The Elite.

On June 19 at Dominion 6.19 in Osaka-jo Hall, Elgin replaced an injured Hiroshi Tanahashi and defeated Kenny Omega in NJPW's first ever ladder match to become the new IWGP Intercontinental Champion. From July 22 to August 13, Elgin took part in the 2016 G1 Climax, where he finished with a record of five wins and four losses. Elgin failed to advance to the finals due to losing to Katsuhiko Nakajima on the final day. On September 25 at Destruction in Kobe, Elgin lost the IWGP Intercontinental Championship to Tetsuya Naito. On October 10 at King of Pro-Wrestling, Elgin suffered a broken left eye socket taking a dropkick from Naito. The injury would require surgery and forced Elgin to pull out of all future events, including a scheduled IWGP Intercontinental Championship rematch with Naito at Power Struggle.

==== Teaming with Jeff Cobb and NEVER Openweight Champion (2017–2019) ====
Elgin returned to NJPW on January 4, 2017, at Wrestle Kingdom 11 in Tokyo Dome, winning the pre-show New Japan Rumble after entering as the first man in. On February 11 at The New Beginning in Osaka, Elgin unsuccessfully challenged Tetsuya Naito for the IWGP Intercontinental Championship. After being sidelined from NJPW due to the size of the promotion's roster, Elgin returned on June 11 at Dominion 6.11 in Osaka-jo Hall, losing to Cody. On July 1 at G1 Special in USA, Elgin took part in a tournament to determine the inaugural IWGP United States Heavyweight Champion, but was eliminated in his first round match by Kenny Omega. Later that month, Elgin entered the 2017 G1 Climax. Despite a win over 2016 G1 Climax winner and reigning IWGP United States Heavyweight Champion Kenny Omega, Elgin finished second to last in his block with a record of four wins and five losses. Due to his win over Minoru Suzuki in the tournament, Elgin was granted a shot at the NEVER Openweight Championship on September 10 at Destruction in Fukushima, but was defeated by Suzuki in a lumberjack deathmatch.

At the end of the year, Elgin teamed with the debuting Jeff Cobb in the 2017 World Tag League. The two did not get along behind the scenes with Elgin making disparaging remarks about his tag team partner in private messages that were made public while the tournament was still in progress. They finished the tournament with a record of four wins and three losses, failing to advance to the finals. At New Japan's Dominion 6.9 in Osaka-jo Hall show, Elgin faced and defeated Taichi and Hirooki Goto to win the NEVER Openweight Championship for the first time. On June 17, 2018 at Kizuna Road, Elgin lost the NEVER openweight title back to Goto in his first defence of the title.

Elgin participated in the 2019 New Japan Cup, losing in the first round to Okada. The tour surrounding the tournament featured Elgin's final match with the promotion on March 24, 2019, teaming with Colt Cabana and Toa Henare to defeat Tencozy and Shota Umino. On April 1, Elgin officially parted ways with NJPW.

=== Mexico (2016–2018) ===
On June 1, 2016, the Mexican Consejo Mundial de Lucha Libre (CMLL) promotion announced Elgin as a participant in the 2016 International Gran Prix. On June 23, 2016, Elgin made his debut in Lucha Libre Elite defeating Jinder Mahal. On June 25, 2016, Elgin also became Lucha Libre Elite's inaugural World Champion by defeating Volador Jr. in a tournament final. On July 1, Elgin took part in the 2016 International Gran Prix, from which he was eliminated by Último Guerrero. On July 10, Elgin was defeated by Último Guerrero in Arena México. Elgin's Mexican tour concluded the following day.

On July 26, 2017, CMLL announced Elgin as a participant in the 2017 International Gran Prix. He started the CMLL tour on August 22. On September 1, Elgin was the last man eliminated from the 2017 International Gran Prix by Diamante Azul. Elgin's Mexican tour concluded the following day. On October 5, Elgin eliminate Último Guerrero winning the 2018 International Gran Prix.

On November 3, 2018, in The Crash Lucha Libre Elgin participated in a Fatal 4-Way by The Crash Heavyweight Championship against Willie Mack, Bárbaro Cavernario and El Mesías in which he was defeated by Mack in the 7th anniversary of The Crash.

=== Impact Wrestling (2019–2020) ===
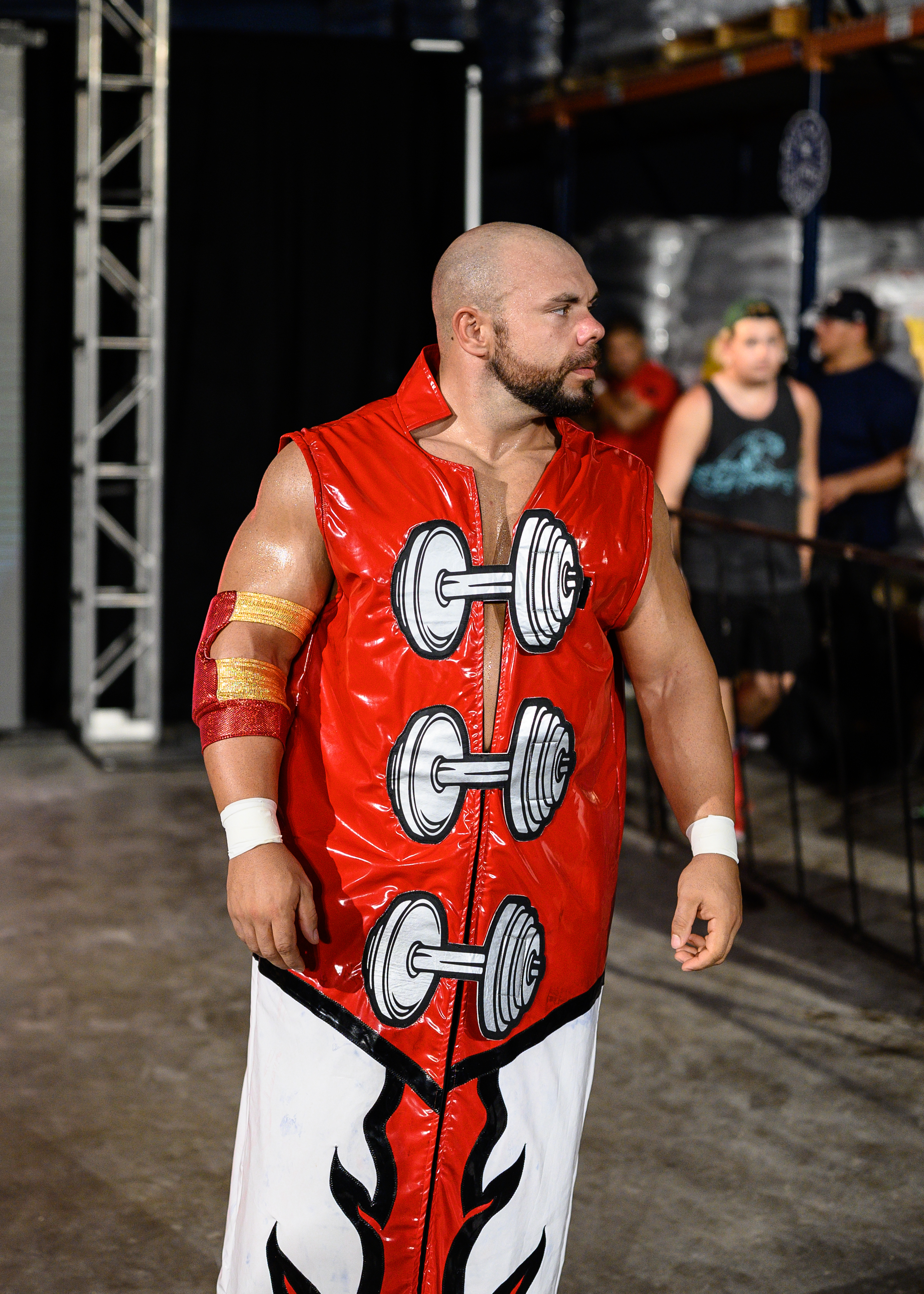
After leaving NJPW, Elgin signed with Impact Wrestling.

Elgin debuted at Impact Wrestling's Impact Wrestling Rebellion show, confronting Brian Cage moments after Cage became the new Impact World Champion and attacked him afterwards. On the May 3 episode of Impact Wrestling, Elgin defeated Johnny Impact and Pentagón Jr. in a triple threat to determine the number one contender for the Impact World Championship. On the May 17 episode of Impact Wrestling, Elgin lost to Rich Swann by disqualification when Elgin beat down Swann outside of the ring. on the May 31 episode of Impact Wrestling, Elgin and Johnny Impact lost to Rich Swann and Willie Mack. on the June 14 episode of Impact Wrestling, Elgin defeated Willie Mack.

On July 7, at the Slammiversary XVII event, Elgin faced Cage for the Impact World Championship, but lost the match. Elgin would attack Cage after their match, only to be speared by a returning Rhino. on the July 19 episode of Impact Wrestling, Elgin and Willie Mack entered a tournament where they defeated Ace Austin and Stone Rockwell in the first round but lost a 4-way tag team elimination match to Sami Callihan and Tessa Blanchard. at Unbreakable, Elgin defeated Eddie Edwards. on the August 23 episode of Impact Wrestling, Elgin fought Rhino to a double count-out. on the August 23 episode of Impact Wrestling, Elgin defeated Rhino in a street fight. on the September 13 episode of Impact Wrestling, Elgin defeated Dinastia. At Victory Road, Elgin defeated TJP. on the October 4 episode of Impact Wrestling, Elgin defeated TJP in a remach. on the October 18 episode of Impact Wrestling, Elgin defeated Fallah Bahh. At Prelude to Glory, Elgin and The North lost to Naomichi Marufuji, Rhino and Rob Van Dam.

At Bound for Glory 2019, Elgin defeated Naomichi Marufuji. on the November 5 episode of Impact Wrestling, Elgin defeated Fallah Bahh. at Turning Point, Elgin defeated Mike Orlando. on the November 19 episode of Impact Wrestling, Elgin competed in a gauntlet match to become #1 contender for the World title but failed to win the match. on the December 3 episode of Impact Wrestling, Elgin defeated Brian Cage and Eddie Edwards. At No Surrender, Elgin defeated Larry D.

At Hard To Kill (2020), Elgin lost to Eddie Edwards. At Bash at the Brewery 2, Elgin defeated Joey Ryan. Starting on the January 28 episode of Impact Wrestling, Elgin and Eddie Edwards competed in a best of 5 series that ened in a draw on the March 10 episode of Impact. on the Match 24 episode of Impact, Elgin and Taya Valkyrie defeated Eddie Edwards and Tessa Blanchard. At Rebellion, Elgin competed in a Three-way match for the TNA World Heavyweight Championship which was won by Moose. on the May 19 episode of Impact Wrestling, Elgin defeated Sami Callihan. on the May 26 episode of Impact Wrestling, Elgin lost to Trey. on the June 9 episode of Impact Wrestling, Elgin defeated Ken Shamrock and Sami Callihan in a three way match. on the June 20 episode of TNA Xplosion, Elgin defeated Larry D in his final match for TNA.

On June 22, 2020, it was announced that Elgin was suspended by Impact following sexual assault allegations that were made public as part of the Speaking Out movement. On June 26, Impact Wrestling announced Elgin would be removed from all future programing and his contract would be terminated.

=== Pro Wrestling Noah (2019–2022) ===
Elgin made his Pro Wrestling NOAH debut on November 2, 2019 in Battle of Aesthetics facing Takashi Sugiura for the newly created GHC National Championship, in which he lost. Elgin returned on January 4, 2020 during the Korakuen Hall tour, facing Katsuhiko Nakajima in a winning effort, and facing Masao Inoue in a winning effort the following day.

On May 21, 2022, Elgin teamed with Masa Kitamiya defeating Sugiura-gun International (El Hijo de Dr. Wagner Jr. and René Duprée) to win the GHC Tag Team Championships.

Following his July 9, 2022 arrest, Elgin was stripped of his GHC Tag Team Championship and removed from future Noah shows.

=== Independent promotions (2022–2024) ===
Elgin won the Championship International Wrestling title in September 2024 by defeating Malice.

== Personal life ==
Frobel lived in Oshawa, Ontario, Canada, but has since moved to Toronto, Ontario, Canada. Frobel previously worked in construction, but required too many days off for his wrestling appearances, forcing him to quit.

In June 2013, Frobel announced his engagement to fellow professional wrestler Rachel Collins, better known under her ring name as MsChif. They wed the following month on July 4. On September 4, 2015, Collins gave birth to her and Frobel's first child, a boy named Jax. The couple divorced in 2020.

In June 2021, Frobel briefly went missing, reportedly leaving his phone at home after sending a "concerning message" on Facebook. He was later found and returned home.

In July 2021, Frobel was arrested for violating a protection order filed by his ex-fiance. The case was turned over to the state attorney's office, but no charges were filed.

In July 2022, Frobel was reportedly arrested in Japan for stealing. Frobel denied the reports, stating he was headed back to Canada following the death of a family member. He has not returned to Japan since.

== Championships and accomplishments ==
- Absolute Intense Wrestling
  - AIW Absolute Championship (1 time)
  - J.T. Lightning Invitational Tournament (2014)
- All American Wrestling
  - AAW Heavyweight Championship (1 time)
  - AAW Heritage Championship (1 time)
  - AAW Tag Team Championship (1 time) – with Ethan Page
  - Jim Lynam Memorial Tournament (2017)
  - Fourth AAW Triple Crown Champion
- Alpha-1 Wrestling
  - A1 Zero Gravity Championship (1 time)
- BSE Pro
  - BSE Tag Team Championship (1 time) – with Ashley Sixx
- Championship International Wrestling
  - CIW Heavyweight Championship (1 time)
  - CIW Tag Team Championship (1 time) – with Calvin Coco
- Canadian Wrestling Revolution
  - CWR Canadian Junior Heavyweight Championship (1 time)
  - CWR World Heavyweight Championship (1 time)
  - Canada Cup Of Wrestling Tournament (2007)
- Consejo Mundial de Lucha Libre
  - CMLL International Gran Prix (2018)
- Dynamo Pro Wrestling
  - Dynamo Pro D-1 Championship (1 time)
- GALLI Lucha Libre
  - GALLI Gladiatores Championship (1 time)
- Glory Pro
  - Glory Tag Team Championship (1 time) – with Everett Connors
- Great Canadian Wrestling
  - GCW National Championship (2 times)
  - GCW Tag Team Championship (4 times) – with Jake O'Reilly (1), Havok (1), Derek Wylde (1) and Ashley Sixx (1)^{[a]}
  - Gold Rush Tournament (2009)
- Hard Knock Wrestling
  - Gr8 Eight (2013)
- Independent Wrestling Association Mid-South
  - IWA Mid-South Heavyweight Championship (2 times)
  - IWA Mid-South Strong Style Championship (1 time)
  - Revolution Strong Style Tournament (2014)
- Lucha Libre Elite
  - Elite World Championship (2016)
- New Japan Pro-Wrestling
  - IWGP Intercontinental Championship (1 time)
  - NEVER Openweight Championship (1 time)
  - NEVER Openweight 6-Man Tag Team Championship (1 time) – with Hiroshi Tanahashi and Yoshitatsu
  - New Japan Rumble (2017)
- New School Wrestling
  - NSW Heavyweight Championship (2 times)
  - NSW Tag Team Championship (1 time) – with Mike Stevens
- Pro Wrestling Eclipse
  - PWE Open Weight Championship (1 time)
- Pro Wrestling Guerrilla
  - PWG World Tag Team Championship (1 time) – with Brian Cage
- Pro Wrestling Illustrated
  - Ranked No. 14 of the top 500 singles wrestlers in the PWI 500 in 2014
- Pro Wrestling Noah
  - GHC Tag Team Championship (1 time) – with Masa Kitamiya
- Pro Wrestling Phoenix
  - PWP Heavyweight Championship (1 time)
- Qatar Pro Wrestling
  - QPW Middle East Championship (1 time)
- Ring of Honor
  - ROH World Championship (1 time)
  - Survival of the Fittest (2011, 2015)
- Xtreme Intense Championship Wrestling
  - XICW Midwest Heavyweight Championship (1 time)
  - XICW United States Championship (1 time)

== Notes ==
^{a} Elgin initially won the championship with Havok, but Derek Wylde replaced Havok as Elgin's tag team partner and co-champion during the reign.
