= List of major NJPW events =

List of pay-per-views produced by New Japan Pro-Wrestling

This is a list of major NJPW events, detailing all notable professional wrestling cards promoted on pay-per-view (PPV), aired on live TV broadcasts by TV Asahi, or streamed on New Japan Pro-Wrestling World by New Japan Pro-Wrestling (NJPW).

== Past events ==
=== 1989 ===
Date	Event	Venue	Location	Main event	Notes
April 24	Battle Satellite in Tokyo Dome	Tokyo Dome	Tokyo, Japan	Antonio Inoki (c) vs. Shota Chochishvili for the WWF World Martial Arts Heavyweight Championship	
(c) – refers to the champion(s) heading into the match

=== 1990 ===
Date	Event	Venue	Location	Main event	Notes
February 10	Super Fight in Tokyo Dome	Tokyo Dome	Tokyo, Japan	Antonio Inoki and Seiji Sakaguchi vs. Masahiro Chono and Shinya Hashimoto	
April 13 (aired 15, May 22, and 29)	Wrestling Summit	Tokyo Dome	Tokyo, Japan	Hulk Hogan vs. Stan Hansen	Co-produced with World Wrestling Federation and All Japan Pro Wrestling
(c) – refers to the champion(s) heading into the match

=== 1991 ===
Date	Event	Venue	Location	Main event	Notes
March 21	Starrcade in Tokyo Dome	Tokyo Dome	Tokyo, Japan	Ric Flair (NWA─c) vs. Tatsumi Fujinami (IWGP─c) for the NWA World Heavyweight Championship and the IWGP Heavyweight Championship	Co-produced with World Championship Wrestling
(c) – refers to the champion(s) heading into the match

=== 1992 ===
Date	Event	Venue	Location	Main event	Notes
January 4	Super Warriors in Tokyo Dome	Tokyo Dome	Tokyo, Japan	Riki Choshu (G18─c) vs. Tatsumi Fujinami (IWGP─c) for the IWGP Heavyweight Championship and the Greatest 18 Club Championship; Sting and The Great Muta vs. The Steiner Brothers (Rick Steiner and Scott Steiner)	Co-produced with World Championship Wrestling
(c) – refers to the champion(s) heading into the match

=== 1993 ===
Date	Event	Venue	Location	Main event	Notes
January 4	Fantastic Story in Tokyo Dome	Tokyo Dome	Tokyo, Japan	Genichiro Tenryu vs. Riki Choshu	Co-produced with World Championship Wrestling
May 3	Wrestling Dontaku	Fukuoka Dome	Fukuoka, Japan	Antonio Inoki and Tatsumi Fujinami vs. Genichiro Tenryu and Riki Choshu	
(c) – refers to the champion(s) heading into the match

=== 1994 ===
Date	Event	Venue	Location	Main event	Notes
January 4	Battlefield	Tokyo Dome	Tokyo, Japan	Antonio Inoki vs. Genichiro Tenryu	
May 1	Wrestling Dontaku	Fukuoka Dome	Fukuoka, Japan	Antonio Inoki vs. The Great Muta	Co-produced with World Championship Wrestling
(c) – refers to the champion(s) heading into the match

=== 1995 ===
Date	Event	Venue	Location	Main event	Notes
January 4	Battle 7	Tokyo Dome	Tokyo, Japan	Shinya Hashimoto (c) vs. Kensuke Sasaki for the IWGP Heavyweight Championship	
April 2	Bridge of Dreams	Tokyo Dome	Tokyo, Japan	Shinya Hashimoto vs. Masahiro Chono	Co-produced with All Japan Pro Wrestling, All Japan Women's Pro-Wrestling, Fighting Network Rings, Frontier Martial-Arts Wrestling, Go Gundan, International Wrestling Association of Japan, JWP Joshi Puroresu, Ladies Legend Pro-Wrestling, Michinoku Pro Wrestling, Pro Wrestling Fujiwara Gumi, and UWF International
April 28–29	Collision in Korea	Rungrado 1 May Stadium	Pyongyang, North Korea	Antonio Inoki vs. Ric Flair	Co-produced with World Championship Wrestling
May 3	Wrestling Dontaku	Fukuoka Dome	Fukuoka, Japan	Shinya Hashimoto (c) vs. Keiji Muto for the IWGP Heavyweight Championship	
October 9	New Japan Pro Wrestling Vs. UWF International	Tokyo Dome	Tokyo, Japan	Keiji Muto (c) vs. Nobuhiko Takada for the IWGP Heavyweight Championship	Co-produced with UWF International
November 13	NJPW/WCW World in Japan	Ryogoku Kokugikan	Tokyo, Japan	Sting (c) vs. Kensuke Sasaki (w/Sonny Onoo) for the WCW United States Heavyweight Championship	
November 14	NJPW/WCW World in Japan	Hamamatsu Arena	Hamamatsu, Shizuoka, Japan	Keiji Muto and Sting vs. Arn Anderson and Ric Flair	
(c) – refers to the champion(s) heading into the match

=== 1996 ===
Date	Event	Venue	Location	Main event	Notes
January 4	Wrestling World	Tokyo Dome	Tokyo, Japan	Keiji Muto (c) vs. Nobuhiko Takada for the IWGP Heavyweight Championship	
April 29	Battle Formation	Tokyo Dome	Tokyo, Japan	Nobuhiko Takada (c) vs. Shinya Hashimoto for the IWGP Heavyweight Championship	
June 1	World Wrestling Peace Festival	Los Angeles Memorial Sports Arena	Los Angeles, California, USA	Antonio Inoki and Dan Severn vs. Yoshiaki Fujiwara and Oleg Taktarov	Co-produced with All Japan Women's Pro-Wrestling, Asistencia Asesoría y Administración, Consejo Mundial de Lucha Libre, Michinoku Pro Wrestling, National Wrestling Alliance, Pro Wrestling Fujiwara Gumi, and World Championship Wrestling First NJPW show in the United States
(c) – refers to the champion(s) heading into the match

=== 1997 ===
Date	Event	Venue	Location	Main event	Notes
January 4	Wrestling World	Tokyo Dome	Tokyo, Japan	Shinya Hashimoto (c) vs. Riki Choshu for the IWGP Heavyweight Championship	Co-produced with Big Japan Wrestling
April 12	Battle Formation	Tokyo Dome	Tokyo, Japan	Naoya Ogawa vs. Shinya Hashimoto in a Different Style Fight	
May 3	Strong Style Evolution	Tokyo Dome	Tokyo, Japan	Shinya Hashimoto (c) vs. Naoya Ogawa for the IWGP Heavyweight Championship	
August 10	The Four Heaven in Nagoya Dome	Nagoya Dome	Nagoya, Aichi, Japan	Shinya Hashimoto (c) vs. Hiroyoshi Tenzan for the IWGP Heavyweight Championship	
November 2	Final Power Hall in Fukuoka Dome	Fukuoka Dome	Fukuoka, Japan	Genichiro Tenryu and Tatsumi Fujinami vs. nWo Japan (Keiji Muto and Masahiro Chono)	
(c) – refers to the champion(s) heading into the match

=== 1998 ===
Date	Event	Venue	Location	Main event	Notes
January 4	Final Power Hall in Tokyo Dome	Tokyo Dome	Tokyo, Japan	Kensuke Sasaki (c) vs. Keiji Muto for the IWGP Heavyweight Championship	
April 4	Antonio Inoki Retirement Show	Tokyo Dome	Tokyo, Japan	Antonio Inoki vs. Don Frye	
August 8	Rising The Next Generations in Osaka Dome	Osaka Dome	Osaka, Japan	Tatsumi Fujinami (c) vs. Masahiro Chono for the IWGP Heavyweight Championship	
(c) – refers to the champion(s) heading into the match

=== 1999 ===
Date	Event	Venue	Location	Main event	Notes
January 4	Wrestling World	Tokyo Dome	Tokyo, Japan	Scott Norton (c) vs. Keiji Muto for the IWGP Heavyweight Championship	
April 10	Strong Style Symphony - New Japan Spirit	Tokyo Dome	Tokyo, Japan	Keiji Muto (c) vs. Don Frye for the IWGP Heavyweight Championship	
August 8	Jingu Climax	Meiji Jingu Stadium	Tokyo, Japan	The Great Muta vs. The Great Nita in a No Rope Explosive Barbed Wire Barricade Explosive Land Mine Double Hell Deathmatch	
October 11	Final Dome	Tokyo Dome	Tokyo, Japan	Naoya Ogawa (c) vs. Shinya Hashimoto for the NWA World Heavyweight Championship	
(c) – refers to the champion(s) heading into the match

=== 2000 ===
Date	Event	Venue	Location	Main event	Notes
January 4	Wrestling World	Tokyo Dome	Tokyo, Japan	Genichiro Tenryu (c) vs. Kensuke Sasaki for the IWGP Heavyweight Championship	
April 7	Dome Impact	Tokyo Dome	Tokyo, Japan	Naoya Ogawa vs. Shinya Hashimoto	
May 5	Wrestling Dontaku	Fukuoka Dome	Fukuoka, Japan	Power Warrior (c) vs. The Great Muta for the IWGP Heavyweight Championship	
July 30	Riki Choshu Revival	Yokohama Arena	Yokohama, Kanagawa, Japan	Atsushi Onita vs. Riki Choshu in a No Rope Explosive Barbed Wire Deathmatch	
October 9	Do Judge!!	Tokyo Dome	Tokyo, Japan	Kensuke Sasaki vs. Toshiaki Kawada	
December 14	The 2nd Judgement!!	Osaka Prefectural Gymnasium	Osaka, Japan	Masanobu Fuchi and Toshiaki Kawada vs. Takashi Iizuka and Yuji Nagata	
(c) – refers to the champion(s) heading into the match

=== 2001 ===
Date	Event	Venue	Location	Main event	Notes
January 4	Wrestling World	Tokyo Dome	Tokyo, Japan	Kensuke Sasaki vs. Toshiaki Kawada tournament final match for the IWGP Heavyweight Championship	
April 9	Strong Style	Osaka Dome	Osaka, Japan	Kensuke Sasaki vs. Shinya Hashimoto in a No Rules match	
May 5	Wrestling Dontaku	Fukuoka Dome	Fukuoka, Japan	Kazunari Murakami and Naoya Ogawa vs. Manabu Nakanishi and Riki Choshu	
June 6	Super-Force Group Declaration	Nippon Budokan	Tokyo, Japan	Kazuyuki Fujita (c) vs. Yuji Nagata for the IWGP Heavyweight Championship	
July 20	Dome-Quake	Sapporo Dome	Sapporo, Hokkaido, Japan	Kazuyuki Fujita (c) vs. Don Frye for the IWGP Heavyweight Championship	
October 8	Indicate of Next	Tokyo Dome	Tokyo, Japan	BATT (Hiroshi Hase and Keiji Muto) vs. Jun Akiyama and Yuji Nagata	
(c) – refers to the champion(s) heading into the match

=== 2002 ===
Date	Event	Venue	Location	Main event	Notes
January 4	Wrestling World	Tokyo Dome	Tokyo, Japan	Jun Akiyama (c) vs. Yuji Nagata for the GHC Heavyweight Championship	
May 2	Toukon Memorial Day 30th Anniversary	Tokyo Dome	Tokyo, Japan	Masahiro Chono vs. Mitsuharu Misawa	
June 7	Battle Zone	Nippon Budokan	Tokyo, Japan	Yuji Nagata (c) vs. Kensuke Sasaki for the IWGP Heavyweight Championship	
October 14	The Spiral	Tokyo Dome	Tokyo, Japan	Yuji Nagata (c) vs. Kazuyuki Fujita for the IWGP Heavyweight Championship	First pay-per-view event produced by New Japan Pro-Wrestling
(c) – refers to the champion(s) heading into the match

=== 2003 ===
Date	Event	Venue	Location	Main event	Notes
January 4	Wrestling World	Tokyo Dome	Tokyo, Japan	Yuji Nagata (c) vs. Josh Barnett for the IWGP Heavyweight Championship	
May 2	Ultimate Crush	Tokyo Dome	Tokyo, Japan	Yoshihiro Takayama (NWF─c) vs. Yuji Nagata (IWGP─c) for the IWGP Heavyweight Championship and the NWF Heavyweight Championship	
August 28	Osaka Dream Night	Osaka Prefectural Gymnasium	Osaka, Japan	Yoshihiro Takayama (c) vs. Masahiro Chono in a Cage Deathmatch for the IWGP Heavyweight Championship	
October 13	Ultimate Crush II	Tokyo Dome	Tokyo, Japan	Yoshihiro Takayama, Kazuyuki Fujita, Minoru Suzuki, Shinsuke Nakamura and Bob Sapp vs. Hiroyoshi Tenzan, Yuji Nagata, Manabu Nakanishi, Hiroshi Tanahashi and Seiji Sakaguchi	
November 3	Yokohama Dead Out	Yokohama Arena	Yokohama, Kanagawa, Japan	Yoshihiro Takayama (c) vs. Hiroyoshi Tenzan for the IWGP Heavyweight Championship	
(c) – refers to the champion(s) heading into the match

=== 2004 ===
Date	Event	Venue	Location	Main event	Notes
January 4	Wrestling World	Tokyo Dome	Tokyo, Japan	Shinsuke Nakamura (IWGP─c) vs. Yoshihiro Takayama (NWF─c) for the IWGP Heavyweight Championship and the NWF Heavyweight Championship	
March 28	King of Sports	Ryōgoku Kokugikan	Tokyo, Japan	Kensuke Sasaki (c) vs.Bob Sapp for the IWGP Heavyweight Championship	
May 3	Nexess	Tokyo Dome	Tokyo, Japan	Bob Sapp (c) vs. Shinsuke Nakamura for the IWGP Heavyweight Championship	
November 13	Toukon Festival	Osaka Dome	Osaka, Japan	Kazuyuki Fujita and Kendo Kashin vs. Manabu Nakanishi and Shinsuke Nakamura	
(c) – refers to the champion(s) heading into the match

=== 2005 ===
Date	Event	Venue	Location	Main event	Notes
January 4	Toukon Festival: Wrestling World	Tokyo Dome	Tokyo, Japan	Hiroshi Tanahashi (c) vs. Shinsuke Nakamura for the IWGP U-30 Openweight Championship	
March 26	Nexess V	Ryōgoku Kokugikan	Tokyo, Japan	Satoshi Kojima (c) vs. Shinsuke Nakamura for the IWGP Heavyweight Championship	
May 14	Nexess VI	Tokyo Dome	Tokyo, Japan	Hiroyoshi Tenzan vs. Satoshi Kojima for the IWGP Heavyweight Championship	
October 8	Toukon Souzou New Chapter	Tokyo Dome	Tokyo, Japan	Kazuyuki Fujita (c) vs. Brock Lesnar vs. Masahiro Chono for the IWGP Heavyweight Championship	
(c) – refers to the champion(s) heading into the match

=== 2006 ===
Date	Event	Venue	Location	Main event	Notes
January 4	Toukon Shidou Chapter 1	Tokyo Dome	Tokyo, Japan	Brock Lesnar (c) vs. Shinsuke Nakamura for the IWGP Heavyweight Championship	
(c) – refers to the champion(s) heading into the match

=== 2007 ===
Date	Event	Venue	Location	Main event	Notes
January 4	Wrestle Kingdom I	Tokyo Dome	Tokyo, Japan	Keiji Muto and Masahiro Chono vs. Tencozy (Hiroyoshi Tenzan and Satoshi Kojima)	Co-produced with All Japan Pro Wrestling
October 8 (aired October 24)	Explosion '07	Ryogoku Kokugikan	Tokyo, Japan	Yuji Nagata (c) vs. Hiroshi Tanahashi for the IWGP Heavyweight Championship	
November 11	Destruction '07	Ryōgoku Kokugikan	Tokyo, Japan	Hiroshi Tanahashi (c) vs. Hirooki Goto for the IWGP Heavyweight Championship	
(c) – refers to the champion(s) heading into the match

=== 2008 ===
Date	Event	Venue	Location	Main event	Notes
January 4	Wrestle Kingdom II	Tokyo Dome	Tokyo, Japan	Hiroshi Tanahashi (c) vs. Shinsuke Nakamura for the IWGP Heavyweight Championship	Co-produced with Total Nonstop Action Wrestling Aired on January 17 in the United States as Global Impact
January 25 (aired February 2)	Exciting Battle	Okinawa Prefectural Budokan	Okinawa, Japan	Hiroshi Tanahashi, Manabu Nakanishi, and Yuji Nagata vs. RISE (Hirooki Goto, Prince Devitt, and Shinsuke Nakamura) in a six-man tag team match	
March 21 (aired March 24)	Masahiro Chono Produce ~CRASH II~	Chiba Port Arena	Chiba, Japan	RISE (Hirooki Goto, Prince Devitt, and Shinsuke Nakamura) vs. Legend (Masahiro Chono and Riki Choshu) and Tatsumi Fujinami in a six-man tag team match	
March 30 (aired April 16)	New Dimension	Korakuen Hall	Tokyo, Japan	Shinsuke Nakamura (c) vs. Hiroshi Tanahashi for the IWGP Heavyweight Championship	
May 2 (aired May 12)	Aggressive	Korakuen Hall	Tokyo, Japan	Koji Kanemoto, Manabu Nakanishi, and Yuji Nagata vs. Sword Army (Ikuto Hidaka, Masato Tanaka, and Ryouji Sai) in a six-man tag team match	
August 26 (aired September 3)	Red Shoes Unno 20th Anniversary	Korakuen Hall	Tokyo, Japan	Hiroshi Tanahashi and Shinsuke Nakamura vs. Hirooki Goto and Tetsuya Naito	
October 20 (aired November 3)	Leonis	Osaka World Building	Osaka, Japan	Shinsuke Nakamura and Yujiro vs. Hirooki Goto and Tetsuya Naito	
October 13	Destruction '08	Ryōgoku Kokugikan	Tokyo, Japan	Keiji Muto (c) vs. Shinsuke Nakamura for the IWGP Heavyweight Championship	
(c) – refers to the champion(s) heading into the match

=== 2009 ===
Date	Event	Venue	Location	Main event	Notes
January 4	Wrestle Kingdom III	Tokyo Dome	Tokyo, Japan	Keiji Muto (c) vs. Hiroshi Tanahashi for the IWGP Heavyweight Championship	Co-produced with Total Nonstop Action Wrestling Aired on October 8 in the United States as Global Impact 2
March 6	Strong Style 37th Anniversary	Korakuen Hall	Tokyo, Japan	Hiroshi Tanahashi and Tiger Mask vs. Legend (Jushin Thunder Liger and Masahiro Chono)	
March 19	Leonis II	Osaka World Hall	Osaka, Japan	Hiroshi Tanahashi, Manabu Nakanishi, and Taichi Ishikari vs. Great Bash Heel (Jado, Tomohiro Ishii, and Val Venis)	
April 5	Resolution	Ryōgoku Kokugikan	Tokyo, Japan	Hiroshi Tanahashi (c) vs. Kurt Angle for the IWGP Heavyweight Championship	
May 3	Wrestling Dontaku	Fukuoka Kokusai Center	Fukuoka, Japan	Hiroshi Tanahashi (c) vs. Hirooki Goto (New Japan Cup 2009 Winner) for the IWGP Heavyweight Championship	
June 20	Dominion 6.20	Osaka Prefectural Gymnasium	Osaka, Japan	Manabu Nakanishi (c) vs.Hiroshi Tanahashi for the IWGP Heavyweight Championship	
July 21	Leonis III	Sapporo Concarino	Sapporo, Hokkaido, Japan	Apollo 55 (Prince Devitt and Ryusuke Taguchi) vs. Hiroshi Tanahashi and Tiger Mask	
September 25	Leonis IV	Wakayama Prefectural Information Exchange Center	Wakayama, Japan	Manabu Nakanishi, Taichi, and Tiger Mask vs. Hirooki Goto, Prince Devitt, and Ryusuke Taguchi	
October 12	Masahiro Chono 25th Anniversary	Ryōgoku Kokugikan	Tokyo, Japan	Keiji Muto, Kenta Kobashi and Masahiro Chono vs. Jun Akiyama, Manabu Nakanishi and Satoshi Kojima	
November 8	Destruction '09	Ryōgoku Kokugikan	Tokyo, Japan	Shinsuke Nakamura (c) vs.Hiroshi Tanahashi for the IWGP Heavyweight Championship	
(c) – refers to the champion(s) heading into the match

=== 2010 ===
Date	Event	Venue	Location	Main event	Notes
January 4	Wrestle Kingdom IV	Tokyo Dome	Tokyo, Japan	Shinsuke Nakamura (c) vs. Yoshihiro Takayama for the IWGP Heavyweight Championship	
May 3	Wrestling Dontaku	Fukuoka Kokusai Center	Fukuoka, Japan	Shinsuke Nakamura (c) vs. Togi Makabe for the IWGP Heavyweight Championship	
June 19	Dominion 6.19	Osaka Prefectural Gymnasium	Osaka, Japan	Togi Makabe (c) vs. Go Shiozaki for the IWGP Heavyweight Championship	
October 11	Destruction '10	Ryōgoku Kokugikan	Tokyo, Japan	Togi Makabe (c) vs. Satoshi Kojima for the IWGP Heavyweight Championship	
(c) – refers to the champion(s) heading into the match

=== 2011 ===
Date	Event	Venue	Location	Main event	Notes
January 4	Wrestle Kingdom V	Tokyo Dome	Tokyo, Japan	Satoshi Kojima (c) vs. Hiroshi Tanahashi for the IWGP Heavyweight Championship	Co-produced with Total Nonstop Action Wrestling Aired on February 24 in the United States as Global Impact 3
January 22	Fantastica Mania	Korakuen Hall	Tokyo, Japan	Shinsuke Nakamura, Tetsuya Naito and Averno vs. Hiroshi Tanahashi, Prince Devitt and Místico	Co-produced with Consejo Mundial de Lucha Libre
January 23	Fantastica Mania	Korakuen Hall	Tokyo, Japan	Golden☆Lovers (Kota Ibushi and Kenny Omega) vs. Apollo 55 (Prince Devitt and Ryusuke Taguchi) for the IWGP Junior Heavyweight Tag Team Championship	Co-produced with Consejo Mundial de Lucha Libre
February 20	The New Beginning	Sendai Sun Plaza Hall	Sendai, Miyagi, Japan	Hiroshi Tanahashi (c) vs. Satoshi Kojima for the IWGP Heavyweight Championship	
May 3	Wrestling Dontaku	Fukuoka Kokusai Center	Fukuoka, Japan	Hiroshi Tanahashi (c) vs. Shinsuke Nakamura for the IWGP Heavyweight Championship	
May 13 (aired June 22)	Invasion Tour: Attack on the East Coast	Rahway Recreation Center	Rahway, New Jersey, USA	Charlie Haas and Rhino vs. Hiroshi Tanahashi and Togi Makabe	Co-produced with Jersey All Pro Wrestling First NJPW tour in the United States
May 14	Invasion Tour: Attack on the East Coast	Pier 36 Basketball City	New York City, New York, USA	Hiroshi Tanahashi (c) vs. Charlie Haas for the IWGP Heavyweight Championship	Co-produced with Jersey All Pro Wrestling First NJPW tour in the United States
May 15	Invasion Tour: Attack on the East Coast	Asylum Arena	Philadelphia, Pennsylvania, USA	Togi Makabe vs. Rhino in a street fight	Co-produced with Jersey All Pro Wrestling First NJPW tour in the United States
June 18	Dominion 6.18	Osaka Prefectural Gymnasium	Osaka, Japan	Hiroshi Tanahashi (c) vs. Hirooki Goto for the IWGP Heavyweight Championship	
August 27	All Together	Nippon Budokan	Tokyo, Japan	Go Shiozaki, Hiroshi Tanahashi and Suwama vs. Kenso, Shinsuke Nakamura, and Takashi Sugiura	Co-produced with All Japan Pro Wrestling and Pro Wrestling Noah
October 10	Destruction '11	Ryōgoku Kokugikan	Tokyo, Japan	Hiroshi Tanahashi (c) vs. Tetsuya Naito for the IWGP Heavyweight Championship	
November 12	Power Struggle	Osaka Prefectural Gymnasium	Osaka, Japan	Hiroshi Tanahashi (c) vs. Toru Yano for the IWGP Heavyweight Championship	
(c) – refers to the champion(s) heading into the match

=== 2012 ===
Date	Event	Venue	Location	Main event	Notes
January 4	Wrestle Kingdom VI	Tokyo Dome	Tokyo, Japan	Hiroshi Tanahashi (c) vs. Minoru Suzuki for the IWGP Heavyweight Championship	
January 21	Fantastica Mania	Korakuen Hall	Tokyo, Japan	Kazuchika Okada and Volador Jr. vs. Hiroshi Tanahashi and La Sombra	Co-produced with Consejo Mundial de Lucha Libre
January 22	Fantastica Mania	Korakuen Hall	Tokyo, Japan	La Sombra (c) vs. Volador Jr. for the NWA World Historic Welterweight Championship	Co-produced with Consejo Mundial de Lucha Libre
February 12	The New Beginning	Osaka Prefectural Gymnasium	Osaka, Japan	Hiroshi Tanahashi (c) vs. Kazuchika Okada for the IWGP Heavyweight Championship	
February 19	All Together	Sendai Sun Plaza Hall	Sendai, Miyagi, Japan	Hiroshi Tanahashi, Suwama and Takeshi Morishima vs. Go Shiozaki, Seiya Sanada. and Tetsuya Naito	Co-produced with All Japan Pro Wrestling and Pro Wrestling Noah
May 3	Wrestling Dontaku	Fukuoka Kokusai Center	Fukuoka, Japan	Kazuchika Okada (c) vs. Hirooki Goto (New Japan Cup 2012 Winner) for the IWGP Heavyweight Championship	
June 16	Dominion 6.16	Bodymaker Colosseum	Osaka, Japan	Kazuchika Okada (c) vs. Hiroshi Tanahashi for the IWGP Heavyweight Championship	
July 1	Summer Night Fever in Ryogoku ~ We Are Pro-Wrestling Love	Ryogoku Kokugikan	Tokyo, Japan	Hiroshi Tanahashi (c) vs. Togi Makabe for the IWGP Heavyweight Championship	Co-produced with All Japan Pro Wrestling
September 23	Destruction	Kobe World Memorial Hall	Kobe, Hyogo, Japan	Hiroshi Tanahashi (c) vs. Naomichi Marufuji for the IWGP Heavyweight Championship	
October 8	King of Pro-Wrestling	Ryōgoku Kokugikan	Tokyo, Japan	Hiroshi Tanahashi (c) vs. Minoru Suzuki for the IWGP Heavyweight Championship	
October 27 (aired November 11)	We Are Pro-Wrestling Love in Taiwan	National Taiwan University Sports Center	Taipei, Taiwan	Team Destruction (Shuji Kondo and Suwama) and Keiji Muto vs. Seigigun (Wataru Inoue and Yuji Nagata) and Koji Kanemoto in a Six-Man Tag Team match	Co-produced with All Japan Pro Wrestling
October 28 (aired November 12)	We Are Pro-Wrestling Love in Taiwan	National Taiwan University Sports Center	Taipei, Taiwan	Kaz Hayashi, Keiji Muto, and Masakatsu Funaki vs. TenKoji (Hiroyoshi Tenzan and Satoshi Kojima) and Wataru Inoue in a Six-Man Tag Team match	Co-produced with All Japan Pro Wrestling
November 11	Power Struggle	Bodymaker Colosseum	Osaka, Japan	Hiroshi Tanahashi (c) vs. Yujiro Takahashi for the IWGP Heavyweight Championship	
(c) – refers to the champion(s) heading into the match

=== 2013 ===
Date	Event	Venue	Location	Main event	Notes
January 4	Wrestle Kingdom 7	Tokyo Dome	Tokyo, Japan	Hiroshi Tanahashi (c) vs. Kazuchika Okada (Tokyo Dome IWGP Heavyweight Championship challenge rights certificate holder) for the IWGP Heavyweight Championship	
February 10	The New Beginning	Hiroshima Sun Plaza	Hiroshima, Japan	Hiroshi Tanahashi (c) vs. Karl Anderson for the IWGP Heavyweight Championship	
April 7	Invasion Attack	Ryōgoku Kokugikan	Tokyo, Japan	Hiroshi Tanahashi (c) vs. Kazuchika Okada (New Japan Cup 2013 Winner) for the IWGP Heavyweight Championship	
May 3	Wrestling Dontaku	Fukuoka Kokusai Center	Fukuoka, Japan	Kazuchika Okada (c) vs. Minoru Suzuki for the IWGP Heavyweight Championship	
June 22	Dominion 6.22	Bodymaker Colosseum	Osaka, Japan	Kazuchika Okada (c) vs. Togi Makabe for the IWGP Heavyweight Championship	
September 29	Destruction	Kobe World Memorial Hall	Kobe, Japan	Kazuchika Okada (c) vs. Satoshi Kojima for the IWGP Heavyweight Championship	
October 14	King of Pro-Wrestling	Ryōgoku Kokugikan	Tokyo, Japan	Kazuchika Okada (c) vs. Hiroshi Tanahashi for the IWGP Heavyweight Championship	
November 9	Power Struggle	Bodymaker Colosseum	Osaka, Japan	Kazuchika Okada (c) vs. Karl Anderson for the IWGP Heavyweight Championship	
(c) – refers to the champion(s) heading into the match

=== 2014 ===
Date	Event	Venue	Location	Main event	Notes
January 4	Wrestle Kingdom 8	Tokyo Dome	Tokyo, Japan	Shinsuke Nakamura (c) vs. Hiroshi Tanahashi for the IWGP Intercontinental Championship	
February 9	The New Beginning in Hiroshima	Hiroshima Sun Plaza	Hiroshima, Japan	Hiroshi Tanahashi (c) vs. Shinsuke Nakamura for the IWGP Intercontinental Championship	
February 11	The New Beginning in Osaka	Bodymaker Colosseum	Osaka, Japan	Kazuchika Okada (c) vs. Hirooki Goto for the IWGP Heavyweight Championship	
April 6	Invasion Attack	Ryōgoku Kokugikan	Tokyo, Japan	Hiroshi Tanahashi (c) vs. Shinsuke Nakamura (New Japan Cup 2014 Winner) for the IWGP Intercontinental Championship	
May 3	Wrestling Dontaku	Fukuoka Kokusai Center	Fukuoka, Japan	Kazuchika Okada (c) vs. A.J. Styles for the IWGP Heavyweight Championship	
May 10	Global Wars	Ted Reeve Arena	Toronto, Ontario, Canada	Adam Cole (c) vs. Kevin Steen for the ROH World Championship	Co-produced with Ring of Honor
May 17	War of the Worlds	Hammerstein Ballroom	New York City, New York, USA	A.J. Styles (c) vs. Kazuchika Okada vs. Michael Elgin in a Three-way match for the IWGP Heavyweight Championship	Co-produced with Ring of Honor
May 25	Back to the Yokohama Arena	Yokohama Arena	Yokohama, Kanagawa, Japan	A.J. Styles (c) vs. Kazuchika Okada for the IWGP Heavyweight Championship	
June 21	Dominion 6.21	Bodymaker Colosseum	Osaka, Japan	Shinsuke Nakamura (c) vs. Bad Luck Fale for the IWGP Intercontinental Championship	
September 21	Destruction in Kobe	Kobe World Memorial Hall	Kobe, Japan	Bad Luck Fale (c) vs. Shinsuke Nakamura for the IWGP Intercontinental Championship	
September 23	Destruction in Okayama	Convex Okayama	Hayashima, Okayama, Japan	Kazuchika Okada (certificate holder) vs. Karl Anderson for the Tokyo Dome IWGP Heavyweight Championship challenge rights certificate	
October 13	King of Pro-Wrestling	Ryōgoku Kokugikan	Tokyo, Japan	A.J. Styles (c) vs. Hiroshi Tanahashi for the IWGP Heavyweight Championship	
November 8	Power Struggle	Bodymaker Colosseum	Osaka, Japan	Shinsuke Nakamura (c) vs. Katsuyori Shibata for the IWGP Intercontinental Championship	

=== 2015 ===
Date	Event	Venue	Location	Main event	Notes
January 4	Wrestle Kingdom 9	Tokyo Dome	Tokyo, Japan	Hiroshi Tanahashi (c) vs. Kazuchika Okada (Tokyo Dome IWGP Heavyweight Championship challenge rights certificate holder) for the IWGP Heavyweight Championship	First Wrestle Kingdom to be broadcast with live English commentary
February 11	The New Beginning in Osaka	Bodymaker Colosseum	Osaka, Japan	Hiroshi Tanahashi (c) vs. A.J. Styles for the IWGP Heavyweight Championship	
April 5	Invasion Attack	Ryōgoku Kokugikan	Tokyo, Japan	A.J. Styles (c) vs. Kota Ibushi (New Japan Cup 2015 Winner) for the IWGP Heavyweight Championship	
May 3	Wrestling Dontaku	Fukuoka Kokusai Center	Fukuoka, Japan	Shinsuke Nakamura (c) vs. Hirooki Goto for the IWGP Intercontinental Championship	
May 12	War of the Worlds	2300 Arena	Philadelphia, Pennsylvania, USA	CHAOS (Kazuchika Okada and Shinsuke Nakamura) vs. The Briscoes (Jay Briscoe and Mark Briscoe)	Co-produced with Ring of Honor
May 13	War of the Worlds	2300 Arena	Philadelphia, Pennsylvania, USA	Bullet Club (A.J. Styles, Matt Jackson, and Nick Jackson) versus The Kingdom (Adam Cole, Matt Taven, and Michael Bennett)	Co-produced with Ring of Honor
May 15	Global Wars	Ted Reeve Arena	Toronto, Ontario, Canada	Bullet Club (A.J. Styles, Doc Gallows, Karl Anderson, Matt Jackson, and Nick Jackson) vs. ROH All Stars (Hanson, Jay Briscoe, Mark Briscoe, Ray Rowe, and Roderick Strong)	Co-produced with Ring of Honor
May 16	Global Wars	Ted Reeve Arena	Toronto, Ontario, Canada	Bullet Club (A.J. Styles, Matt Jackson and Nick Jackson) versus CHAOS (Trent Beretta, Kazuchika Okada, and Rocky Romero)	Co-produced with Ring of Honor
July 5	Dominion 7.5 in Osaka-jo Hall	Osaka-jō Hall	Osaka, Japan	A.J. Styles (c) vs. Kazuchika Okada for the IWGP Heavyweight Championship	
September 23	Destruction in Okayama	Momotaro Arena	Okayama, Japan	Togi Makabe (c) vs. Kota Ibushi for the NEVER Openweight Championship	
September 27	Destruction in Kobe	Kobe World Memorial Hall	Kobe, Japan	Hirooki Goto (c) vs. Shinsuke Nakamura for the IWGP Intercontinental Championship	
October 2	Uprising	York Hall	Bethnal Green, London, England	AJ Styles (c) vs. Marty Scurll vs. Will Ospreay for the British Heavyweight Championship	Co-produced with Revolution Pro Wrestling First NJPW show in the United Kingdom
October 12	King of Pro-Wrestling	Ryōgoku Kokugikan	Tokyo, Japan	Kazuchika Okada (c) vs. A.J. Styles for the IWGP Heavyweight Championship	
November 7	Power Struggle	Osaka Prefectural Gymnasium	Osaka, Japan	Shinsuke Nakamura (c) vs. Karl Anderson for the IWGP Intercontinental Championship	
(c) – refers to the champion(s) heading into the match

=== 2016 ===
Date	Event	Venue	Location	Main event	Notes
January 4	Wrestle Kingdom 10	Tokyo Dome	Tokyo, Japan	Kazuchika Okada (c) vs. Hiroshi Tanahashi (Tokyo Dome IWGP Heavyweight Championship challenge rights certificate holder) for the IWGP Heavyweight Championship	
February 11	The New Beginning in Osaka	Edion Arena Osaka	Osaka, Japan	Kazuchika Okada (c) vs. Hirooki Goto for the IWGP Heavyweight Championship	
April 10	Invasion Attack	Ryōgoku Kokugikan	Tokyo, Japan	Kazuchika Okada (c) vs. Tetsuya Naito (New Japan Cup 2016 Winner) for the IWGP Heavyweight Championship	
May 3	Wrestling Dontaku	Fukuoka Kokusai Center	Fukuoka, Japan	Tetsuya Naito (c) vs. Tomohiro Ishii for the IWGP Heavyweight Championship	
May 8	Global Wars	Frontier Fieldhouse	Chicago Ridge, Illinois, USA	Jay Lethal (c) vs. Colt Cabana for the ROH World Championship	Co-produced with Ring of Honor
May 9	War of the Worlds	Ford Community & Performing Arts Center	Dearborn, Michigan, USA	Motor City Machine Guns (Alex Shelley and Chris Sabin), Colt Cabana, and The Briscoes (Jay Briscoe, and Mark Briscoe) vs. Bullet Club (Adam Cole, Matt Jackson, Nick Jackson, Tama Tonga, and Tanga Loa) in a ten-man tag team match	Co-produced with Ring of Honor
May 11	War of the Worlds	Ted Reeve Arena	Toronto, Ontario, Canada	Bullet Club (Kenny Omega, Matt Jackson, Tama Tonga, and Tanga Loa) vs. Jay Briscoe, Mark Briscoe, Jay Lethal, and Roderick Strong in an eight-man tag team match	Co-produced with Ring of Honor
May 14	War of the Worlds	Terminal 5	New York City, New York, USA	Bullet Club (Adam Cole and Matt Jackson) vs. CHAOS (Kazuchika Okada and Tomohiro Ishii) vs. Jay Lethal and Roderick Strong in a three-way tag team match	Co-produced with Ring of Honor
June 19	Dominion 6.19 in Osaka-jo Hall	Osaka-jō Hall	Osaka, Japan	Tetsuya Naito (c) vs. Kazuchika Okada for the IWGP Heavyweight Championship	
September 17	Destruction in Tokyo	Ota City General Gymnasium	Ota, Tokyo, Japan	Kushida (c) vs. Bushi for the IWGP Junior Heavyweight Championship	
September 22	Destruction in Hiroshima	Hiroshima Sun Plaza Hall	Hiroshima, Japan	Kenny Omega (certificate holder) vs. Yoshi-Hashi for the Tokyo Dome IWGP Heavyweight Championship challenge rights certificate	
September 25	Destruction in Kobe	Kobe World Memorial Hall	Kobe, Japan	Michael Elgin (c) vs. Tetsuya Naito for the IWGP Intercontinental Championship	
October 10	King of Pro-Wrestling	Ryōgoku Kokugikan	Tokyo, Japan	Kazuchika Okada (c) vs. Naomichi Marufuji for the IWGP Heavyweight Championship	
November 5	Power Struggle	Edion Arena Osaka	Osaka, Japan	Tetsuya Naito (c) vs. Jay Lethal for the IWGP Intercontinental Championship	
(c) – refers to the champion(s) heading into the match

=== 2017 ===
Date	Event	Venue	Location	Main event	Notes
January 4	Wrestle Kingdom 11	Tokyo Dome	Tokyo, Japan	Kazuchika Okada (c) vs. Kenny Omega (Tokyo Dome IWGP Heavyweight Championship challenge rights certificate holder) for the IWGP Heavyweight Championship	
January 5	New Year Dash!!	Korakuen Hall	Tokyo, Japan	Los Ingobernables de Japón (Evil, Sanada, and Bushi) (c) vs. Taguchi Japan (Hiroshi Tanahashi, Manabu Nakanishi, and Ryusuke Taguchi) for the NEVER Openweight 6 Man Tag Team Championship	
February 5	The New Beginning in Sapporo ~Resurrection!~	Hokkai Kitayell	Sapporo, Japan	Kazuchika Okada (c) vs. Minoru Suzuki for the IWGP Heavyweight Championship	
February 11	The New Beginning in Osaka	Osaka Prefectural Gymnasium	Osaka, Japan	Tetsuya Naito (c) vs. Michael Elgin for the IWGP Intercontinental Championship	
February 26	Honor Rising: Japan	Korakuen Hall	Tokyo, Japan	The Briscoe Brothers (Jay Briscoe and Mark Briscoe) vs. Bullet Club (Kenny Omega and Adam Cole)	Co-produced with Ring of Honor Aired as a two-part event
February 27	Honor Rising: Japan	Korakuen Hall	Tokyo, Japan	The Briscoe Brothers (Jay Briscoe and Mark Briscoe) and Chaos (Kazuchika Okada and Will Ospreay) vs. Bullet Club (Kenny Omega, Cody, Matt Jackson and Nick Jackson)	Co-produced with Ring of Honor Aired as a two-part event
April 9	Sakura Genesis	Ryōgoku Kokugikan	Tokyo, Japan	Kazuchika Okada (c) vs. Katsuyori Shibata (New Japan Cup 2017 Winner) for the IWGP Heavyweight Championship	
May 3	Wrestling Dontaku	Fukuoka Kokusai Center	Fukuoka, Japan	Kazuchika Okada (c) vs. Bad Luck Fale for the IWGP Heavyweight Championship	
May 7	War of the Worlds	Ted Reeve Arena	Toronto, Ontario, Canada	The Addiction (Christopher Daniels and Frankie Kazarian) and Hiroshi Tanahashi vs. The Elite (Kenny Omega, Matt Jackson, and Nick Jackson)	Co-produced with Ring of Honor
May 10	War of the Worlds	Ford Community & Performing Arts Center	Dearborn, Michigan, USA	Bullet Club (Cody, Hangman Page, Matt Jackson, and Nick Jackson) vs. CHAOS (Trent Beretta, Hirooki Goto, Rocky Romero, and Will Ospreay)	Co-produced with Ring of Honor
May 12	War of the Worlds	Hammerstein Ballroom	New York City, New York, USA	Christopher Daniels (c) vs. Cody vs. Jay Lethal in a Three-way match for the ROH World Championship	Co-produced with Ring of Honor
May 14	War of the Worlds	2300 Arena	Philadelphia, Pennsylvania, USA	Adam Cole vs. Marty Scurll in a Philadelphia Street Fight	
June 11	Dominion 6.11 in Osaka-jo Hall	Osaka-jō Hall	Osaka, Japan	Kazuchika Okada (c) vs. Kenny Omega for the IWGP Heavyweight Championship	
July 1	G1 Special in USA	Long Beach Convention and Entertainment Center	Long Beach, California, USA	Kazuchika Okada (c) vs. Cody for the IWGP Heavyweight Championship	
July 2	G1 Special in USA	Long Beach Convention and Entertainment Center	Long Beach, California, USA	Kenny Omega vs. Tomohiro Ishii to determine the inaugural IWGP United States Heavyweight Champion	
August 18	War of the Worlds UK	York Hall	London, England, UK	Bullet Club (Cody, Hangman Page, Marty Scurll, Matt Jackson, and Nick Jackson) vs. Los Ingobernables de Japon (Bushi, Evil, Hiromu Takahashi, Sanada, and Tetsuya Naito)	Co-produced with Ring of Honor, Consejo Mundial de Lucha Libre, and Revolution Pro Wrestling
August 19	War of the Worlds UK	Liverpool Olympia	Liverpool, England, UK	Cody (c) vs. Sanada for the ROH World Championship	Co-produced with Ring of Honor, Consejo Mundial de Lucha Libre, and Revolution Pro Wrestling
August 20	War of the Worlds UK	Edinburgh Corn Exchange	Edinburgh, Scotland, UK	Jay Lethal vs. Silas Young in an Edinburgh Street Fight	Co-produced with Ring of Honor, Consejo Mundial de Lucha Libre, and Revolution Pro Wrestling
September 10	Destruction in Fukushima	Azuma Gymnasium	Fukushima, Japan	Minoru Suzuki (c) vs. Michael Elgin in a Lumberjack deathmatch for the NEVER Openweight Championship	
September 16	Destruction in Hiroshima	Hiroshima Sun Plaza	Hiroshima, Japan	Hiroshi Tanahashi (c) vs. Zack Sabre Jr. for the IWGP Intercontinental Championship	
September 24	Destruction in Kobe	World Memorial Hall	Kobe, Japan	Kenny Omega (c) vs. Juice Robinson for the IWGP United States Heavyweight Championship	
October 9	King of Pro-Wrestling	Ryōgoku Kokugikan	Tokyo, Japan	Kazuchika Okada (c) vs. Evil for the IWGP Heavyweight Championship	
October 12	Global Wars	Buffalo Riverworks	Buffalo, New York, USA	The Elite (Kenny Omega and The Young Bucks (Matt Jackson and Nick Jackson) (c) vs. The Kingdom (Matt Taven, Vinny Marseglia. and TK O’Ryan) for the ROH World Six Man Tag Team Championship	Co-produced with Ring of Honor
October 13	Global Wars	Stage AE	Pittsburgh, Pennsylvania, USA	Bullet Club (Kenny Omega, Cody, and Marty Scurll) (c) vs. Chaos (Toru Yano, Will Ospreay, and Yoshi-Hashi)	Co-produced with Ring of Honor
October 14	Global Wars	Express Live	Columbus, Ohio, USA	Bullet Club (Kenny Omega, The Young Bucks (Matt Jackson and Nick Jackson)) (c) vs. Best Friends (Trent Beretta and Chuckie T) and Flip Gordon for the ROH World Six Man Tag Team Championship	Co-produced with Ring of Honor
October 15	Global Wars	Odeum Expo Center	Villa Park, Illinois, USA	Kenny Omega (c) vs. Yoshi-Hashi for the IWGP United States Heavyweight Championship	Co-produced with Ring of Honor
November 5	Power Struggle	Osaka Prefectural Gymnasium	Osaka, Japan	Hiroshi Tanahashi (c) vs. Kota Ibushi for the IWGP Intercontinental Championship	
(c) – refers to the champion(s) heading into the match

=== 2018 ===
Date	Event	Venue	Location	Main event	Notes
January 4	Wrestle Kingdom 12	Tokyo Dome	Tokyo, Japan	Kazuchika Okada (c) vs. Tetsuya Naito (Tokyo Dome IWGP Heavyweight Championship challenge rights certificate holder) for the IWGP Heavyweight Championship	
January 5	New Year Dash!!	Korakuen Hall	Tokyo, Japan	Chaos (Kazuchika Okada, Tomohiro Ishii, Yoshi-Hashi, Will Ospreay, and Gedo) vs. Los Ingobernables de Japón (Tetsuya Naito, Evil, Sanada, Bushi, and Hiromu Takahashi)	
January 27	The New Beginning in Sapporo	Hokkai Kitayell	Sapporo, Japan	Hiroshi Tanahashi (c) vs. Minoru Suzuki for the IWGP Intercontinental Championship	
January 28	The New Beginning in Sapporo	Hokkai Kitayell	Sapporo, Japan	Kenny Omega (c) vs. Jay White for the IWGP United States Heavyweight Championship	
February 10	The New Beginning in Osaka	Osaka Prefectural Gymnasium	Osaka, Japan	Kazuchika Okada (c) vs. Sanada for the IWGP Heavyweight Championship	
February 23	Honor Rising: Japan	Korakuen Hall	Tokyo, Japan	Golden Lovers (Kenny Omega and Kota Ibushi) and Chase Owens vs. Bullet Club (Cody, Hangman Page, and Marty Scurll)	
February 24	Honor Rising: Japan	Korakuen Hall	Tokyo, Japan	Golden Lovers (Kenny Omega and Kota Ibushi) vs. Bullet Club (Cody and Marty Scurll)	
March 25	Strong Style Evolved	Walter Pyramid	Long Beach, California, USA	Golden Lovers (Kenny Omega and Kota Ibushi) vs. The Young Bucks (Matt Jackson and Nick Jackson)	
April 1	Sakura Genesis	Ryōgoku Kokugikan	Tokyo, Japan	Kazuchika Okada (c) vs. Zack Sabre Jr. (New Japan Cup 2018 Winner) for the IWGP Heavyweight Championship	
April 29	Wrestling Hinokuni	Grand Messe Kumamoto	Kumamoto, Japan	Minoru Suzuki (c) vs. Tetsuya Naito for the IWGP Intercontinental Championship	
May 3	Wrestling Dontaku	Fukuoka Kokusai Center	Fukuoka, Japan	Kenny Omega vs. Hangman Page	
May 4	Wrestling Dontaku	Fukuoka Kokusai Center	Fukuoka, Japan	Kazuchika Okada (c) vs. Hiroshi Tanahashi for the IWGP Heavyweight Championship	
May 9	War of the Worlds	Lowell Memorial Auditorium	Lowell, Massachusetts, USA	The Young Bucks (Matt Jackson, and Nick Jackson) vs. Los Ingobernables de Japon (Bushi and Hiromu Takahashi)	
May 11	War of the Worlds	Ted Reeve Arena	Toronto, Ontario, Canada	Los Ingobernables de Japon (Bushi, Hiromu Takahashi and Sanada) vs. Colt Cabana, Jay Lethal, and Kenny King	Co-produced with Ring of Honor
May 12	War of the Worlds	Royal Oak Music Theatre	Royal Oak, Michigan, USA	The Briscoes (Jay Briscoe and Mark Briscoe) vs. Los Ingobernables de Japon (Tetsuya Naito and Bushi)	Co-produced with Ring of Honor
May 13	War of the Worlds	Odeum Expo Center	Villa Park, Illinois, USA	Bullet Club (Cody, Marty Scurll, Hangman Page, Matt Jackson and Nick Jackson) vs. Los Ingobernables de Japon (Bushi, Sanada, Evil, Tetsuya Naito, and Hiromu Takahashi)	Co-produced with Ring of Honor
June 9	Dominion 6.9 in Osaka-jo Hall	Osaka-jo Hall	Osaka, Japan	Kazuchika Okada (c) vs. Kenny Omega in a No time limit two out of three falls match for the IWGP Heavyweight Championship	
June 29	CEO×NJPW: When Worlds Collide	Ocean Center	Daytona Beach, Florida, USA	Golden☆Lovers (Kenny Omega and Kota Ibushi) vs. Los Ingobernables de Japón (Tetsuya Naito and Hiromu Takahashi)	Held in conjunction with the CEO eSports tournament
July 7	G1 Special in San Francisco	Cow Palace	Daly City, California, USA	Kenny Omega (c) vs. Cody for the IWGP Heavyweight Championship	
September 15	Destruction in Hiroshima	Hiroshima Sun Plaza	Hiroshima, Japan	Kenny Omega (c) vs Tomohiro Ishii for the IWGP Heavyweight Championship	
September 17	Destruction in Beppu	Beppu B-con Plaza	Beppu, Japan	Tetsuya Naito vs. Minoru Suzuki	
September 23	Destruction in Kobe	World Memorial Hall	Kobe, Japan	Hiroshi Tanahashi (certificate holder) vs. Kazuchika Okada for the Tokyo Dome IWGP Heavyweight Championship challenge rights certificate	
September 30	Fighting Spirit Unleashed	Walter Pyramid	Long Beach, California, USA	Chaos (Kazuchika Okada and Tomohiro Ishii) vs. Golden Lovers (Kenny Omega and Kota Ibushi)	
October 8	King of Pro-Wrestling	Ryōgoku Kokugikan	Tokyo, Japan	Kenny Omega (c) vs. Cody vs. Kota Ibushi in a Three-way match for the IWGP Heavyweight Championship	
November 3	Power Struggle	Osaka Prefectural Gymnasium	Osaka, Japan	Chris Jericho (c) vs. Evil for the IWGP Intercontinental Championship	
(c) – refers to the champion(s) heading into the match

=== 2019 ===
Date	Event	Venue	Location	Main event	Notes
January 4	Wrestle Kingdom 13	Tokyo Dome	Tokyo, Japan	Hiroshi Tanahashi (Tokyo Dome IWGP Heavyweight Championship challenge rights certificate holder) vs. Kenny Omega (c) for the IWGP Heavyweight Championship	
January 5	New Year Dash!!	Korakuen Hall	Tokyo, Japan	Chaos (Kazuchika Okada and Yoshi-Hashi) and Hiroshi Tanahashi vs. Bullet Club (Jay White, Bad Luck Fale, and Gedo)	
January 30	The New Beginning USA	Globe Theater	Los Angeles, California, USA	LifeBlood (Juice Robinson and Tracy Williams) vs. Roppongi Vice (Beretta and Rocky Romero)	
February 1	The New Beginning USA	Grady Cole Center	Charlotte, North Carolina, USA	Juice Robinson (c) vs. Beretta for the IWGP United States Heavyweight Championship	
February 2	The New Beginning USA	War Memorial Auditorium	Nashville, Tennessee, USA	LifeBlood (Juice Robinson, David Finlay, and Tracy Williams) vs. CHAOS (Beretta, Chuckie T., and Rocky Romero) in a six-man tag team elimination match	
February 2	The New Beginning in Sapporo	Hokkai Kitayell	Sapporo, Japan	Hiroshi Tanahashi and Kazuchika Okada vs. Bullet Club (Jay White and Bad Luck Fale)	
February 3	The New Beginning in Sapporo	Hokkai Kitayell	Sapporo, Japan	Tetsuya Naito (c) vs. Taichi for the IWGP Intercontinental Championship	
February 11	The New Beginning in Osaka	Osaka Prefectural Gymnasium	Osaka, Japan	Hiroshi Tanahashi (c) vs Jay White for the IWGP Heavyweight Championship	
February 22	Honor Rising: Japan	Korakuen Hall	Tokyo, Japan	Hiroshi Tanahashi, Kazuchika Okada and Jay Lethal vs. The Kingdom (Matt Taven, T. K. O'Ryan, and Vinny Marseglia)	Co-produced with Ring of Honor
February 23	Honor Rising: Japan	Korakuen Hall	Tokyo, Japan	The Briscoe Brothers (Jay Briscoe and Mark Briscoe) (c) vs. FinJuice (Juice Robinson and David Finlay) for the ROH World Tag Team Championship	Co-produced with Ring of Honor
April 6	G1 Supercard	Madison Square Garden	New York City, New York, USA	Jay White (c) vs. Kazuchika Okada (New Japan Cup 2019 Winner) for the IWGP Heavyweight Championship	Co-produced with Ring of Honor
April 29	Wrestling Hinokuni	Grand Messe Kumamoto	Kumamoto, Japan	Hirooki Goto vs. Jay White	
May 3	Wrestling Dontaku	Fukuoka Kokusai Center	Fukuoka, Japan	Dragon Lee (c) vs. Taiji Ishimori for the IWGP Junior Heavyweight Championship	
May 4	Wrestling Dontaku	Fukuoka Kokusai Center	Fukuoka, Japan	Kazuchika Okada (c) vs. Sanada for the IWGP Heavyweight Championship	
May 8	War of the Worlds	Buffalo Riverworks	Buffalo, New York, USA	Guerrillas of Destiny (Tama Tonga and Tanga Loa) (c) vs. Jay Lethal and Jonathan Gresham for the ROH World Tag Team Championship	Co-produced with Ring of Honor
May 9	War of the Worlds	Ted Reeve Arena	Toronto, Ontario, Canada	Matt Taven (c) vs. PCO for the ROH World Championship	Co-produced with Ring of Honor
May 11	War of the Worlds	DeltaPlex Arena	Grand Rapids, Michigan, USA	Jay Lethal, Jeff Cobb, Hirooki Goto, Satoshi Kojima, and Yuji Nagata vs. Bully Ray, The Briscoes (Jay Briscoe and Mark Briscoe), Silas Young & Shane Taylor	Co-produced with Ring of Honor
May 12	War of the Worlds	Odeum Expo Center	Villa Park, Illinois, USA	Jay Lethal vs. Jeff Cobb vs. PCO vs. Rush in a Four Corner Survival match	Co-produced with Ring of Honor
June 9	Dominion 6.9 in Osaka-jo Hall	Osaka-jo Hall	Osaka, Japan	Kazuchika Okada (c) vs. Chris Jericho for the IWGP Heavyweight Championship	
June 29	Southern Showdown	Festival Hall	Melbourne, Victoria, Australia	Kazuchika Okada and Hiroshi Tanahashi vs. Bullet Club (Jay White and Bad Luck Fale)	
June 30	Southern Showdown	UNSW Roundhouse	Sydney, New South Wales, Australia	Chaos (Kazuchika Okada and Will Ospreay) and Hiroshi Tanahashi vs. Bullet Club (Jay White, Bad Luck Fale, and Robbie Eagles)	
August 8	Summer Supercard	Mattamy Athletic Centre	Toronto, Ontario, Canada	The Briscoes (Jay Briscoe and Mark Briscoe) (c) vs. Guerrillas of Destiny (Tama Tonga and Tanga Loa) in a Ladder War VIII match for the ROH World Tag Team Championship	Co-produced with Ring of Honor, Consejo Mundial de Lucha Libre, and National Wrestling Alliance
August 31	Royal Quest	Copper Box Arena	London, England, UK	Kazuchika Okada (c) vs. Minoru Suzuki for the IWGP Heavyweight Championship	
September 15	Destruction in Beppu	Beppu B-con Plaza	Beppu, Oita, Japan	Hiroshi Tanahashi (c) vs. Zack Sabre Jr. for the British Heavyweight Championship	
September 16	Destruction in Kagoshima	Kagoshima Arena	Kagoshima, Japan	Kota Ibushi (certificate holder) vs. Kenta for the Tokyo Dome IWGP Heavyweight Championship challenge rights certificate	
September 22	Destruction in Kobe	World Memorial Hall	Kobe, Japan	Tetsuya Naito (c) vs. Jay White for the IWGP Intercontinental Championship	
October 14	King of Pro-Wrestling	Ryōgoku Kokugikan	Tokyo, Japan	Kazuchika Okada (c) vs. Sanada for the IWGP Heavyweight Championship	
November 3	Power Struggle	Osaka Prefectural Gymnasium	Osaka, Japan	Jay White (c) vs. Hirooki Goto for the IWGP Intercontinental Championship	
(c) – refers to the champion(s) heading into the match

=== 2020 ===
Date	Event	Venue	Location	Main event	Notes
January 4	Wrestle Kingdom 14	Tokyo Dome	Tokyo, Japan	Kazuchika Okada (c) vs. Kota Ibushi (Tokyo Dome IWGP Heavyweight Championship challenge rights certificate holder) for the IWGP Heavyweight Championship	
January 5	Wrestle Kingdom 14	Tokyo Dome	Tokyo, Japan	Kazuchika Okada (Heavyweight Champion) vs. Tetsuya Naito (Intercontinental Champion) for the IWGP Heavyweight Championship and IWGP Intercontinental Championship	
January 6	New Year Dash!!	Ota City General Gymnasium	Ota, Tokyo, Japan	Los Ingobernables de Japón (Sanada and Tetsuya Naito) vs. Bullet Club (Jay White and Kenta)	
January 24	The New Beginning USA	St. Petersburg Coliseum	St. Petersburg, Florida, USA	Taguchi Japan (Hiroshi Tanahashi, David Finlay, and Juice Robinson) and Rocky Romero vs. Bullet Club (Chase Owens, Tanga Loa, Tama Tonga, Yujiro Takahashi, and Jado) in an Eight-man tag team elimination match	
January 26	The New Beginning USA	War Memorial Auditorium	Nashville, Tennessee, USA	FinJuice (David Finlay, and Juice Robinson) and Rocky Romero vs. Bullet Club (Chase Owens, Tanga Loa, and Tama Tonga)	
January 27	The New Beginning USA	Durham Armory	Durham, North Carolina, USA	Taguchi Japan (Hiroshi Tanahashi, David Finlay and Juice Robinson) and Yoshi-Hashi vs. Bullet Club (Chase Owens, Tanga Loa, Tama Tonga, Yujiro Takahashi and Jado)	
January 30	The New Beginning USA	Charles F. Dodge City Center	Pembroke Pines, Florida, USA	Hiroshi Tanahashi and Rocky Romero vs. Guerrillas of Destiny (Tanga Loa and Tama Tonga)	
February 1	The New Beginning USA	Coca-Cola Roxy	Atlanta, Georgia, USA	FinJuice (David Finlay and Juice Robinson) (c) vs. Guerrillas of Destiny (Tanga Loa and Tama Tonga) for the IWGP Tag Team Championship	
February 1	The New Beginning in Sapporo	Hokkaido Prefectural Sports Center	Sapporo, Japan	Hirooki Goto (c) vs. Shingo Takagi for the NEVER Openweight Championship	
February 2	The New Beginning in Sapporo	Hokkaido Prefectural Sports Center	Sapporo, Japan	Kazuchika Okada vs. Taichi	
February 9	The New Beginning in Osaka	Osaka-jo Hall	Osaka, Japan	Tetsuya Naito (c) vs. Kenta for the IWGP Heavyweight Championship and IWGP Intercontinental Championship	
July 12	Dominion in Osaka-jo Hall	Osaka-jo Hall	Osaka, Japan	Tetsuya Naito (c) vs. Evil (New Japan Cup 2020 Winner) for the IWGP Heavyweight Championship and IWGP Intercontinental Championship	
July 25	Sengoku Lord in Nagoya	Aichi Prefectural Gymnasium	Nagoya, Japan	Evil (c) vs. Hiromu Takahashi for the IWGP Heavyweight Championship and IWGP Intercontinental Championship	
August 29	Summer Struggle in Jingu	Meiji Jingu Stadium	Tokyo, Japan	Evil (c) vs. Tetsuya Naito for the IWGP Heavyweight Championship and IWGP Intercontinental Championship	
November 7	Power Struggle	Osaka Prefectural Gymnasium	Osaka, Japan	Tetsuya Naito (c) vs. Evil for the IWGP Heavyweight Championship and IWGP Intercontinental Championship	
(c) – refers to the champion(s) heading into the match

=== 2021 ===
Date	Event	Venue	Location	Main event	Notes
January 4	Wrestle Kingdom 15	Tokyo Dome	Tokyo, Japan	Tetsuya Naito (c) vs. Kota Ibushi for the IWGP Heavyweight Championship and IWGP Intercontinental Championship	
January 5	Wrestle Kingdom 15	Tokyo Dome	Tokyo, Japan	Kota Ibushi (c) vs. Jay White (Tokyo Dome IWGP Heavyweight and IWGP Intercontinental championships challenge rights certificate holder) for the IWGP Heavyweight Championship and IWGP Intercontinental Championship	
January 6	New Year Dash!!	Tokyo Dome City Hall	Tokyo, Japan	Golden Ace (Kota Ibushi and Hiroshi Tanahashi), Roppongi 3K (Rocky Romero and Sho), and Master Wato vs. Los Ingobernables de Japón (Sanada, Shingo Takagi, Tetsuya Naito, Hiromu Takahashi, and Bushi)	
January 30	The New Beginning in Nagoya	Aichi Prefectural Gymnasium	Nagoya, Japan	Shingo Takagi (c) vs. Hiroshi Tanahashi for the NEVER Openweight Championship	
February 10	The New Beginning in Hiroshima	Hiroshima Sun Plaza	Hiroshima, Japan	Hiromu Takahashi (c) vs. Sho for the IWGP Junior Heavyweight Championship	
February 11	The New Beginning in Hiroshima	Hiroshima Sun Plaza	Hiroshima, Japan	Kota Ibushi (c) vs. Sanada for the IWGP Heavyweight Championship and IWGP Intercontinental Championship	
February 27	Castle Attack	Osaka-jo Hall	Osaka, Japan	Kazuchika Okada vs. Evil	
February 28	Castle Attack	Osaka-jo Hall	Osaka, Japan	Kota Ibushi (c) vs. Tetsuya Naito for IWGP Intercontinental Championship	
March 4	NJPW 49th Anniversary Show	Nippon Budokan	Tokyo, Japan	Kota Ibushi (c) vs. El Desperado for the IWGP Heavyweight Championship and IWGP Intercontinental Championship	
April 4	Sakura Genesis	Ryōgoku Kokugikan	Sumida, Tokyo, Japan	Kota Ibushi (c) vs. Will Ospreay (New Japan Cup 2021 Winner) for the IWGP World Heavyweight Championship	
May 3	Wrestling Dontaku	Fukuoka Kokusai Center	Fukuoka, Japan	Hiroshi Tanahashi (c) vs. Jay White for the NEVER Openweight Championship	
May 4	Wrestling Dontaku	Fukuoka Kokusai Center	Fukuoka, Japan	Will Ospreay (c) vs. Shingo Takagi for the IWGP World Heavyweight Championship	
June 7	Dominion 6.6 in Osaka-jo Hall	Osaka-jo Hall	Osaka, Japan	Shingo Takagi vs. Kazuchika Okada for the vacant IWGP World Heavyweight Championship	
July 10	Summer Struggle in Sapporo	Makomanai Sekisui Heim Ice Arena	Sapporo, Hokkaido, Japan	El Desperado (c) vs. Taiji Ishimori for The IWGP Junior Heavyweight Championship	
July 11	Summer Struggle in Sapporo	Makomanai Sekisui Heim Ice Arena	Sapporo, Hokkaido, Japan	Dangerous Tekkers (Taichi and Zack Sabre Jr.) (c) vs. Los Ingobernables de Japón (Tetsuya Naito and Sanada) for the IWGP Tag Team Championship	
July 22	Summer Struggle in Osaka	Osaka Prefectural Gymnasium	Osaka, Japan	Tetsuya Naito vs. Taichi	
July 23	Summer Struggle in Osaka	Osaka Prefectural Gymnasium	Osaka, Japan	Tetsuya Naito vs. Zack Sabre Jr.	
July 24	Summer Struggle in Nagoya	Aichi Prefectural Gymnasium	Nagoya, Japan	Hiroshi Tanahashi vs. Kenta	
July 25	Wrestle Grand Slam in Tokyo Dome	Tokyo Dome	Tokyo, Japan	Shingo Takagi (c) vs. Hiroshi Tanahashi for the IWGP World Heavyweight Championship	
August 14	Resurgence	The Torch at LA Coliseum	Los Angeles, California, USA	Lance Archer (c) vs. Hiroshi Tanahashi for the IWGP United States Heavyweight Championship	
August 16	Fighting Spirit Unleashed	Thunder Studios	Long Beach, California, USA	Tom Lawlor (c) (with J. R. Kratos) vs. Lio Rush for the Strong Openweight Championship	
September 4	Wrestle Grand Slam in MetLife Dome	MetLife Dome	Tokorozawa, Saitama, Japan	Hiroshi Tanahashi (c) vs. Kota Ibushi for the IWGP United States Heavyweight Championship	
September 5	Wrestle Grand Slam in MetLife Dome	MetLife Dome	Tokorozawa, Saitama, Japan	Shingo Takagi (c) vs. Evil for the IWGP World Heavyweight Championship	
November 6	Power Struggle	Osaka Prefectural Gymnasium	Osaka, Japan	Shingo Takagi (c) vs. Zack Sabre Jr. for the IWGP World Heavyweight Championship	
November 13	Battle in the Valley	San Jose Civic	San Jose, California, US	Jay White (c) vs. Tomohiro Ishii for the NEVER Openweight Championship	
(c) – refers to the champion(s) heading into the match

=== 2022 ===
Date	Event	Venue	Location	Main event	Notes
January 4	Wrestle Kingdom 16	Tokyo Dome	Tokyo, Japan	Shingo Takagi (c) vs. Kazuchika Okada (Tokyo Dome IWGP World Heavyweight Championship challenge rights certificate holder) for the IWGP World Heavyweight Championship	co-produced with Pro Wrestling Noah
January 5	Wrestle Kingdom 16	Tokyo Dome	Tokyo, Japan	Kazuchika Okada (c) vs. Will Ospreay for the IWGP World Heavyweight Championship	co-produced with Pro Wrestling Noah
January 8	Wrestle Kingdom 16	Yokohama Arena	Yokohama, Japan	Kazuchika Okada and Hiroshi Tanahashi vs. Keiji Mutoh and Kaito Kiyomiya	co-produced with Pro Wrestling Noah
March 1	NJPW 50th Anniversary Show	Nippon Budokan	Tokyo, Japan	Kazuchika Okada, Hiroshi Tanahashi and Tatsumi Fujinami vs. Suzuki-gun (Minoru Suzuki and Zack Sabre Jr.) and Yoshiaki Fujiwara	
April 1	Lonestar Shootout	Fairmont Hotel	Dallas, Texas, USA	Tomohiro Ishii vs. Chris Dickinson; Team Filthy (J. R. Kratos, Royce Isaacs and Tom Lawlor) vs. Fred Rosser, Alex Coughlin and The DKC	
April 9	Hyper Battle '22	Ryōgoku Kokugikan	Tokyo, Japan	Kazuchika Okada (c) vs. Zack Sabre Jr. (New Japan Cup 2022 winner) for the IWGP World Heavyweight Championship	
April 16	Windy City Riot	Odeum Expo Center	Villa Park, Illinois, USA	Jon Moxley vs. Will Ospreay	
May 1	Wrestling Dontaku	Fukuoka PayPay Dome	Fukuoka, Japan	Kazuchika Okada (c) vs. Tetsuya Naito for the IWGP World Heavyweight Championship	
May 14	Capital Collision	Entertainment and Sports Arena	Washington, D.C., USA	Hiroshi Tanahashi (c) vs. Juice Robinson vs. Will Ospreay vs. Jon Moxley for the IWGP United States Heavyweight Championship	
June 12	Dominion 6.12 in Osaka-jo Hall	Osaka-jō Hall	Osaka, Japan	Kazuchika Okada (c) vs. Jay White for the IWGP World Heavyweight Championship	
June 26	Forbidden Door	United Center	Chicago, Illinois, USA	Hiroshi Tanahashi vs. Jon Moxley for the AEW Interim World Championship	Co-produced with All Elite Wrestling
July 30	Music City Mayhem	Nashville Fairgrounds	Nashville, Tennessee, USA	Jon Moxley vs. El Desperado in a no disqualification match	
August 21	Fighting Spirit Unleashed	The Vermont Hollywood	Los Angeles, California, USA	Fred Rosser (c) vs. TJP for the Strong Openweight Championship	
September 25	Burning Spirit	World Memorial Hall	Kobe, Japan	Will Ospreay (c) vs. David Finlay for the IWGP United States Heavyweight Championship	
October 1	Royal Quest II	Crystal Palace Indoor Arena London	London, England, UK	FTR (Cash Wheeler and Dax Harwood) (c) vs. Aussie Open (Mark Davis and Kyle Fletcher) for the IWGP Tag Team Championship	
October 2	Royal Quest II	Crystal Palace Indoor Arena London	London, England, UK	Tetsuya Naito vs. Zack Sabre Jr. in a #1 contender match for the IWGP United States Heavyweight Championship	
October 10	Declaration of Power	Ryōgoku Kokugikan	Tokyo, Japan	Jay White (c) vs. Tama Tonga for the IWGP World Heavyweight Championship	
October 28	Rumble on 44th Street	Palladium Times Square	New York City, New York, USA	Bullet Club (Jay White and Juice Robinson) vs. Kazuchika Okada and Eddie Kingston	
November 5	Battle Autumn '22	Osaka Prefectural Gymnasium	Osaka, Japan	Will Ospreay (c) vs. Tetsuya Naito for the IWGP United States Heavyweight Championship	
November 20	Historic X-Over	Ariake Arena	Tokyo, Japan	Mayu Iwatani vs. Kairi for the inaugural IWGP Women's Championship	Co-produced with Stardom
(c) – refers to the champion(s) heading into the match

=== 2023 ===
Date	Event	Venue	Location	Main event	Notes
January 4	Wrestle Kingdom 17 in Tokyo Dome	Tokyo Dome	Tokyo, Japan	Jay White (c) vs. Kazuchika Okada (Tokyo Dome IWGP World Heavyweight Championship challenge rights certificate holder) for the IWGP World Heavyweight Championship	
January 5	New Year Dash!!	Ota City General Gymnasium	Tokyo, Japan	Kazuchika Okada and Kenny Omega vs. United Empire (Aaron Henare and Jeff Cobb)	
January 21	Wrestle Kingdom 17 in Yokohama Arena	Yokohama Arena	Yokohama, Kanagawa, Japan	Tetsuya Naito vs. Kenoh	
January 22	The New Beginning in Nagoya	Aichi Prefectural Gymnasium	Nagoya, Japan	Shingo Takagi (c) vs. Great-O-Khan in a Mixed martial arts rules match for the Provisional KOPW 2023 Championship	
February 4	The New Beginning in Sapporo	Hokkaido Prefectural Sports Center	Sapporo, Japan	Shota Umino vs. Tetsuya Naito	
February 5	The New Beginning in Sapporo	Hokkaido Prefectural Sports Center	Sapporo, Japan	Hiromu Takahashi (c) vs. Yoh for the IWGP Junior Heavyweight Championship	
February 11	The New Beginning in Osaka	Osaka Prefectural Gymnasium	Osaka, Japan	Kazuchika Okada (c) vs. Shingo Takagi for the IWGP World Heavyweight Championship	
February 18	Battle in the Valley	San Jose Civic	San Jose, California, USA	Kazuchika Okada (c) vs. Hiroshi Tanahashi for the IWGP World Heavyweight Championship	
March 1	All Star Junior Festival	Korakuen Hall	Tokyo, Japan	Master Wato vs. Atsuki Aoyagi	
March 6	NJPW 51st Anniversary Show	Ota City General Gymnasium	Tokyo, Japan	Bishamon (Hirooki Goto and Yoshi-Hashi) (c) vs. Kazuchika Okada and Hiroshi Tanahashi for the IWGP Tag Team Championship	
March 30	Multiverse United	Globe Theater	Los Angeles, California, USA	Hiroshi Tanahashi vs. Mike Bailey	Co-produced with Impact Wrestling
April 8	Sakura Genesis	Ryōgoku Kokugikan	Tokyo, Japan	Kazuchika Okada (c) vs. Sanada for the IWGP World Heavyweight Championship	
April 15	Capital Collision	Entertainment and Sports Arena	Washington, D.C., USA	The Motor City Machine Guns (Alex Shelley and Chris Sabin) (c) vs. Aussie Open (Mark Davis and Kyle Fletcher) vs. Dream Team (Hiroshi Tanahashi and Kazuchika Okada) for the Strong Openweight Tag Team Championship	
April 15	Collision in Philadelphia	2300 Arena	Philadelphia, Pennsylvania, USA	Aussie Open (Mark Davis and Kyle Fletcher) vs. CHAOS (Tomohiro Ishii and Lio Rush) for the Strong Openweight Tag Team Championship	
April 29	Wrestling Satsuma no Kuni	Kagoshima Arena	Kagoshima, Japan	Shingo Takagi (c) vs. Taichi in a Takagi Style Triad match for the Provisional KOPW 2023 Championship	
May 3	Wrestling Dontaku	Fukuoka Kokusai Center	Fukuoka, Japan	Sanada (c) vs. Hiromu Takahashi for the IWGP World Heavyweight Championship	
May 21	Resurgence	Walter Pyramid	Long Beach, California, USA	Mercedes Moné vs. Willow Nightingale in a tournament final match for the inaugural Strong Women's Championship	
June 4	Dominion 6.4 in Osaka-jo Hall	Osaka-jō Hall	Osaka, Japan	Sanada (c) vs. Yota Tsuji for the IWGP World Heavyweight Championship	
June 9	All Together: Again	Ryōgoku Kokugikan	Tokyo, Japan	Kazuchika Okada, Yuma Aoyagi and Kenoh vs. Hiroshi Tanahashi, Kento Miyahara and Kaito Kiyomiya	Co-produced with All Japan Pro Wrestling and Pro Wrestling Noah
June 25	AEW x NJPW: Forbidden Door	Scotiabank Arena	Toronto, Ontario, Canada	Bryan Danielson vs. Kazuchika Okada	Co-produced with All Elite Wrestling
June 30	Fantastica Mania Mexico	Arena México	Mexico City, Mexico	Rocky Romero (c) vs. Volador Jr. for the NWA World Historic Welterweight Championship	Co-produced with Consejo Mundial de Lucha Libre
July 4	Independence Day	Korakuen Hall	Tokyo, Japan	Jun Kasai and El Desperado vs. Homicide and Jon Moxley in a No Disqualification doomsday match	
July 5	Independence Day	Korakuen Hall	Tokyo, Japan	Jon Moxley vs. El Desperado in a Final Death match	
August 19	All Star Junior Festival USA	2300 Arena	Philadelphia, Pennsylvania, USA	Mike Bailey vs. Kevin Knight in a tournament final match in the All Star Jr. Festival USA tournament	
August 20	Multiverse United 2	2300 Arena	Philadelphia, Pennsylvania, USA	Alex Shelley (c) vs. Hiroshi Tanahashi for the Impact World Championship	Co-produced with Impact Wrestling
September 24	Destruction in Kobe	Kobe World Memorial Hall	Kobe, Japan	Will Ospreay (c) vs. Yota Tsuji for the IWGP United States Heavyweight Championship	
October 9	Destruction in Ryogoku	Ryōgoku Kokugikan	Tokyo, Japan	Sanada (c) vs. Evil in a lumberjack match for the IWGP World Heavyweight Championship	
October 14	Royal Quest III	Copper Box Arena	London, England, UK	Will Ospreay (c) vs. Zack Sabre Jr. for the IWGP United Kingdom Heavyweight Championship	
October 28	Fighting Spirit Unleashed	Sam's Town Hotel and Gambling Hall Las Vegas	Las Vegas, Nevada, USA	Tama Tonga (c) vs. Shingo Takagi for the NEVER Openweight Championship	
November 4	Power Struggle	Osaka Prefectural Gymnasium	Osaka, Japan	Will Ospreay (c) vs. Shota Umino for the IWGP United Kingdom Heavyweight Championship	
November 10	Lonestar Shootout	Curtis Culwell Center	Garland, Texas, USA	Shingo Takagi (c) vs. Trent Beretta for the NEVER Openweight Championship	
(c) – refers to the champion(s) heading into the match

=== 2024 ===
Date	Event	Venue	Location	Main event	Notes
January 4	Wrestle Kingdom 18	Tokyo Dome	Tokyo, Japan	Sanada (c) vs. Tetsuya Naito (Tokyo Dome IWGP World Heavyweight Championship challenge rights certificate holder) for the IWGP World Heavyweight Championship	
January 5	New Year Dash!!	Sumida City Gymnasium	Tokyo, Japan	TMDK (Zack Sabre Jr., Kosei Fujita, Shane Haste and Mikey Nicholls) vs. Chaos (Tomohiro Ishii and Kazuchika Okada) and Blackpool Combat Club (Jon Moxley and Bryan Danielson)	
January 13	Battle in the Valley	San Jose Civic	San Jose, California, USA	Kazuchika Okada vs. Will Ospreay	
January 20	The New Beginning in Nagoya	Aichi Prefectural Gymnasium	Nagoya, Aichi, Japan	Tama Tonga (c) vs. Evil in a lumberjack match for the NEVER Openweight Championship	
February 11	The New Beginning in Osaka	Osaka Prefectural Gymnasium	Osaka, Japan	United Empire (Will Ospreay, Jeff Cobb, Henare, TJP and Francesco Akira) vs. Bullet Club War Dogs (David Finlay, Alex Coughlin, Gabe Kidd, Clark Connors and Drilla Moloney) in a Steel Cage match	
February 23	The New Beginning in Sapporo	Hokkaido Prefectural Sports Center	Sapporo, Hokkaido, Japan	David Finlay (c) vs. Nic Nemeth for the IWGP Global Heavyweight Championship	
February 24	The New Beginning in Sapporo	Hokkaido Prefectural Sports Center	Sapporo, Hokkaido, Japan	Tetsuya Naito (c) vs. Sanada for the IWGP World Heavyweight Championship	
March 6	NJPW 52nd Anniversary Show	Ota City General Gymnasium	Tokyo, Japan	Tetsuya Naito (World Heavyweight) vs. Sho (Junior Heavyweight) in a Champion vs. Champion match	
April 6	Sakura Genesis	Ryōgoku Kokugikan	Tokyo, Japan	Tetsuya Naito (c) vs. Yota Tsuji for the IWGP World Heavyweight Championship	
April 12	Windy City Riot	Wintrust Arena	Chicago, Illinois, USA	Tetsuya Naito (c) vs. Jon Moxley for the IWGP World Heavyweight Championship	
April 14	Wrestling World	Zepp New Taipei	New Taipei City, Taiwan	Toru Yano, Oleg Boltin and Hiroshi Tanahashi vs. House of Torture (Evil, Sho and Yoshinobu Kanemaru) for the vacant NEVER Openweight Six-Man Tag Team Championship	
April 29	Satsuma no Kuni	Kagoshima Arena	Kagoshima, Japan	Sho (c) vs. Douki for the IWGP Junior Heavyweight Championship	
May 3	Wrestling Dontaku	Fukuoka Kokusai Center	Fukuoka, Japan	Nic Nemeth (c) vs. Hiroshi Tanahashi for the IWGP Global Heavyweight Championship	
May 4	Wrestling Dontaku	Fukuoka Kokusai Center	Fukuoka, Japan	Jon Moxley (c) vs. Ren Narita for the IWGP World Heavyweight Championship	
May 6	All Together 2024	Nippon Budokan	Tokyo, Japan	Shota Umino, Kaito Kiyomiya, and Yuki Ueno vs. Yuya Uemura, Konosuke Takeshita, and Shun Skywalker	Co-produced with Pro Wrestling Noah, DDT Pro-Wrestling, Dragongate, Big Japan Pro Wrestling, and Stardom
May 11	Resurgence	Toyota Arena	Ontario, California, USA	Jon Moxley (c) vs. Shota Umino for the IWGP World Heavyweight Championship	
June 9	Dominion 6.9 in Osaka-jo Hall	Osaka-jo Hall	Osaka, Japan	El Desperado vs. Taiji Ishimori in the Best of the Super Jr. tournament final	
June 10	Despe Invitacional	Korakuen Hall	Osaka, Japan	Bullet Club (Dick Togo and Gedo) vs. Danshoku Dino and El Desperado	
June 15	All Together: Sapporo	Hokkaido Prefectural Sports Center	Sapporo, Hokkaido, Japan	Tetsuya Naito vs. Jake Lee	Co-produced with Pro Wrestling Noah, DDT Pro-Wrestling, Dragongate, Big Japan Pro Wrestling, and Stardom
June 21	Fantastica Mania Mexico	Arena México	Mexico City, Mexico	Místico vs. Hiromu Takahashi	Co-produced with Consejo Mundial de Lucha Libre
June 30	Forbidden Door	UBS Arena	Elmont, New York, USA	Swerve Strickland (c) vs. Will Ospreay for the AEW World Championship	Co-produced with All Elite Wrestling
July 13	Fantastica Mania Lucha Libre USA	Mt. Pleasant High School	San Jose, California, USA	Douki and Místico vs. Rocky Romero and Volador Jr.	Co-produced with Consejo Mundial de Lucha Libre
August 30	Capital Collision	Entertainment and Sports Arena	Washington, D.C., USA	Mercedes Moné (c) vs. Momo Watanabe for the Strong Women's Championship	
September 29	Destruction in Kobe	Kobe World Memorial Hall	Kobe, Hyogo, Japan	Tetsuya Naito (c) vs. Great-O-Khan for the IWGP World Heavyweight Championship	
October 14	King of Pro-Wrestling	Ryōgoku Kokugikan	Tokyo, Japan	Tetsuya Naito (c) vs. Zack Sabre Jr. for the IWGP World Heavyweight Championship	
October 20	Royal Quest IV	Crystal Palace National Sports Centre	London, England, UK	Zack Sabre Jr. (c) vs. Sanada for the IWGP World Heavyweight Championship	
November 4	Power Struggle	Osaka Prefectural Gymnasium	Osaka, Japan	Zack Sabre Jr. (c) vs. Shingo Takagi for the IWGP World Heavyweight Championship	
November 8	Fighting Spirit Unleashed	Lowell Memorial Auditorium	Lowell, Massachusetts, USA	Gabe Kidd (c) vs. Kosei Fujita for the Strong Openweight Championship	
November 17	Historic X-Over 2	Osaka Prefectural Gymnasium	Osaka, Japan	Zack Sabre Jr. and Maika vs. El Desperado and Starlight Kid	Co-produced with Stardom
December 14	Immortal Fighting Spirit	Modern Sky Lab	Shanghai, China	Great-O-Khan and Francesco Akira vs. Satoshi Kojima and Master Wato	Co-produced with Infin Pro-Wrestling, Inoki Genome Federation, Dragon Fighting Wrestling, and Hong Kong Wrestling Federation
December 15	Strong Style Evolved	Walter Pyramid	Long Beach, California, USA	Mercedes Moné (c) vs. Hazuki for the Strong Women's Championship	
(c) – refers to the champion(s) heading into the match

=== 2025 ===
Date	Event	Venue	Location	Main event	Notes
January 4	Wrestle Kingdom 19	Tokyo Dome	Tokyo, Japan	Zack Sabre Jr. (c) vs. Shota Umino for the IWGP World Heavyweight Championship	
January 5	Wrestle Dynasty	Tokyo Dome	Tokyo, Japan	Zack Sabre Jr. (c) vs. Ricochet for the IWGP World Heavyweight Championship	Co-produced with All Elite Wrestling, Ring of Honor, Consejo Mundial de Lucha Libre, and Stardom
January 6	New Year Dash!!	Ota City General Gymnasium	Tokyo, Japan	Chaos (Hirooki Goto, Rocky Romero, Yoh, and Yoshi-Hashi) vs. TMDK (Kosei Fujita, Robbie Eagles, Ryohei Oiwa, and Zack Sabre Jr.)	
January 11	Battle in the Valley	San Jose Civic	San Jose, California, USA	El Desperado (c) vs. Taiji Ishimori for the IWGP Junior Heavyweight Championship	
January 19	Wrestling Life 40th Anniversary Yuji Nagata Blue Justice XV	Chiba-Sakura Municipal Gymnasium	Sakura, Chiba, Japan	Hiroshi Tanahashi, Oleg Boltin, Toru Yano and Yuji Nagata vs. House of Torture (Ren Narita, Sho, Yoshinobu Kanemaru and Yujiro Takahashi)	
February 10	The New Beginning in Osaka	Osaka Prefectural Gymnasium	Osaka, Japan	Zack Sabre Jr. (c) vs. Hirooki Goto for the IWGP World Heavyweight Championship	
March 6	NJPW 53rd Anniversary Show	Ota City General Gymnasium	Tokyo, Japan	Hirooki Goto (c) vs. Hiroshi Tanahashi for the IWGP World Heavyweight Championship	
April 5	Sakura Genesis	Ryōgoku Kokugikan	Tokyo, Japan	Hirooki Goto (c) vs. David Finlay for the IWGP World Heavyweight Championship	
April 11	Windy City Riot	Wintrust Arena	Chicago, Illinois, USA	Konosuke Takeshita vs. Hiroshi Tanahashi	
May 3	Wrestling Dontaku	Fukuoka Kokusai Center	Fukuoka, Japan	Bullet Club War Dogs (David Finlay, Clark Connors, Drilla Moloney, Gabe Kidd and Taiji Ishimori) vs. House of Torture (Evil, Ren Narita, Sanada, Sho and Yoshinobu Kanemaru) in a Dog Pound match	
May 4	Wrestling Dontaku	Fukuoka Kokusai Center	Fukuoka, Japan	Hirooki Goto (c) vs. Callum Newman for the IWGP World Heavyweight Championship	
May 9	Resurgence	Toyota Arena	Ontario, California, USA	Mercedes Moné (c) vs. AZM vs. Mina Shirakawa for the Strong Women's Championship	
June 9	NJPW vs. DDT: Toru Yano vs. Super Sasadango Machine	Korakuen Hall	Tokyo, Japan	Super Sasadango Machine (c) vs. Toru Yano for the DDT Extreme Championship	Co-produced with DDT Pro Wrestling
June 15	Dominion 6.15 in Osaka-jo Hall	Osaka-jo Hall	Osaka, Japan	Hirooki Goto (c) vs. Shingo Takagi for the IWGP World Heavyweight Championship	
June 20	Fantastica Mania Mexico	Arena México	Mexico City, Mexico	El Sky Team (Máscara Dorada, Místico) vs. Bandido and Hologram in a tag team match	Co-produced with Consejo Mundial de Lucha Libre
June 24	Death Pain Invitational	Korakuen Hall	Tokyo, Japan	El Desperado (c) vs. Jun Kasai in a fluorescent light tubes, glass board, barbed wire death match for the IWGP Junior Heavyweight Championship	
June 29	Tanahashi Jam	Aichi Prefectural Gymnasium	Nagoya, Japan	Hiroshi Tanahashi and Naomichi Marufuji vs. Kaito Kiyomiya and Ryohei Oiwa	This was a televised special event that aired on TV Asahi
August 24	AEW x NJPW: Forbidden Door	The O2 Arena	London, England, UK	Hiroshi Tanahashi, Golden Lovers (Kenny Omega and Kota Ibushi), Darby Allin, and Will Ospreay vs. Death Riders (Claudio Castagnoli and Jon Moxley), The Young Bucks (Matt Jackson and Nick Jackson), and Gabe Kidd in a Lights Out Steel Cage match	Co-produced with All Elite Wrestling
September 28	Destruction in Kobe	World Memorial Hall	Kobe, Japan	Zack Sabre Jr. (c) vs. Ren Narita for the IWGP World Heavyweight Championship	
October 5	Historic X-Over in Guangzhou	66 Livehouse	Guangzhou, China	Cosmic Angels (Natsupoi, Saori Anou, and Sayaka Kurara) vs. H.A.T.E. (Natsuko Tora, Ruaka, and Rina)	Co-produced with Stardom and INFIN
October 13	King of Pro-Wrestling	Ryōgoku Kokugikan	Tokyo, Japan	Zack Sabre Jr. (c) vs. Konosuke Takeshita for the IWGP World Heavyweight Championship	
November 2	Tanahashi Final Homecoming	Gifu Memorial Center	Gifu, Japan	Konosuke Takeshita (c) vs. Hirooki Goto for the IWGP World Heavyweight Championship	
(c) – refers to the champion(s) heading into the match

=== 2026 ===
Date	Event	Venue	Location	Main event	Notes
January 4	Wrestle Kingdom 20	Tokyo Dome	Tokyo, Japan	Hiroshi Tanahashi vs. Kazuchika Okada	This was the first 4 January Tokyo Dome Show to be aired on TV Asahi since 2004
January 5	New Year Dash!!	Ota City General Gymnasium	Tokyo, Japan	Knock Out Brothers (Oskar and Yuto-Ice) (c) vs. TMDK (Zack Sabre Jr. and Ryohei Oiwa) for the IWGP Tag Team Championship	
February 11	The New Beginning in Osaka	Osaka Prefectural Gymnasium	Osaka, Japan	Yota Tsuji (c) vs. Jake Lee for the IWGP Heavyweight Championship	
February 27	The New Beginning USA	CURE Insurance Arena	Trenton, New Jersey, USA	Yota Tsuji (c) vs. Andrade El Ídolo for the IWGP Global Heavyweight Championship	
March 6	54th Anniversary Show	Ota City General Gymnasium	Tokyo, Japan	Douki (c) vs. Master Wato for the IWGP Junior Heavyweight Championship	
April 4	Sakura Genesis	Ryōgoku Kokugikan	Tokyo, Japan	Yota Tsuji (c) vs. Callum Newman for the IWGP Heavyweight Championship	
April 12	Fantastica Mania USA	Festival Hall	Charleston, South Carolina, USA	Mads Krule Krügger vs. Big Damo	Co-produced with Consejo Mundial de Lucha Libre and Major League Wrestling
April 17	Death Vegas Invitational	Horseshoe Las Vegas	Paradise, Nevada, USA	El Desperado and Jun Kasai vs. The H8 Club (Nick Gage and Matt Tremont) vs. Masashi Takeda and Rina Yamashita in a Love and Pieces three-way tag team deathmatch	Held in conjunction with Game Changer Wrestling's Collective
May 3	Wrestling Dontaku	Fukuoka Kokusai Center	Fukuoka, Japan	Yota Tsuji (c) vs. Andrade El Idolo for the IWGP Global Heavyweight Championship	
May 4	Wrestling Dontaku	Fukuoka Kokusai Center	Fukuoka, Japan	Callum Newman (c) vs. Shingo Takagi for the IWGP Heavyweight Championship	
June 8	NJPW vs. DDT Part 2	Korakuen Hall	Tokyo, Japan	Sanshiro Takagi vs. Konosuke Takeshita, Toru Yano, Antonio Honda, Akito, El Desperado, Danshoku Dino, Hirooki Goto, Kazuki Hirata, Kushida, Mao, Ryusuke Taguchi, Super Sasadango Machine, Hinata Kasai, Masatora Yasuda, and Tatsuya Matsumoto in a 16-on-1 Handicap match	Co-produced with DDT Pro Wrestling
June 14	Dominion 6.14 in Osaka-jo Hall	Osaka-jo Hall	Osaka, Japan	Callum Newman (c) vs. Yota Tsuji for the IWGP Heavyweight Championship	
June 19	Fantastica Mania Mexico	Arena México	Mexico City, Mexico	Místico, Blue Panther, and Tiger Mask vs. Averno, Volador Jr., and Black Tiger in a Trios match	Co-produced with Consejo Mundial de Lucha Libre
June 28	Forbidden Door	SAP Center	San Jose, California, USA	Will Ospreay vs. Swerve Strickland (with Prince Nana) in Men's Owen Hart Cup Final	Co-produced with All Elite Wrestling, Consejo Mundial de Lucha Libre and Stardom
July 7	Tiger Mask's Retirement Match	Korakuen Hall	Tokyo, Japan	Tiger Mask vs. Black Tiger	
September 27	Destruction in Kobe	World Memorial Hall	Kobe, Japan	Yota Tsuji (c) vs. Hirooki Goto for the IWGP Heavyweight Championship	
October 12	King of Pro-Wrestling	Ryōgoku Kokugikan	Tokyo, Japan	Yota Tsuji (c) vs. Ryohei Oiwa for the IWGP Heavyweight Championship	
November 3	Power Struggle	Hiroshima Sun Plaza	Hiroshima, Japan	Gabe Kidd (c) vs. Taichi for the IWGP Global Heavyweight Championship	

== Upcoming event schedule ==
=== 2026 ===
Date	Event	Venue	Location	Main event	Notes
November 15	Lucha Kingdom	Arena México	Mexico City, Mexico	Último Guerrero and Místico vs. Yota Tsuji and Hirooki Goto	Co-produced with Consejo Mundial de Lucha Libre

=== 2027 ===
Date	Event	Venue	Location	Main event	Notes
January 4	Wrestle Kingdom 21	Tokyo Dome	Tokyo, Japan	Yota Tsuji (c) vs. Kenny Omega for the IWGP Heavyweight Championship	
January 5	New Year Dash!!	Ota City General Gymnasium	Tokyo, Japan	TBA	
February 13	The New Beginning in Osaka	Osaka Prefectural Gymnasium	Osaka, Japan	TBA	

== Number of events by year ==
Overall total – 403 (4 more confirmed)

Number of NJPW events

== See also ==
- List of All Elite Wrestling pay-per-view events
- List of major Lucha Libre AAA Worldwide events
- List of ECW supercards and pay-per-view events
- List of FMW supercards and pay-per-view events
- List of Global Force Wrestling events and specials
- List of Major League Wrestling events
- List of National Wrestling Alliance pay-per-view events
- List of NWA/WCW closed-circuit events and pay-per-view events
- List of Ring of Honor pay-per-view events
- List of Smokey Mountain Wrestling supercard events
- List of TNA pay-per-view and livestreaming events
- List of WCW Clash of the Champions shows
- List of World Class Championship Wrestling Supercard events
- List of WWA pay-per-view events
- List of WWE pay-per-view and WWE Network events
- List of WWE Saturday Night Main Event shows
- List of WWE Tribute to the Troops shows
