= Death Vegas Invitational =

2026 New Japan Pro-Wrestling professional wrestling event

- Promotion: New Japan Pro-Wrestling
- Date: April 16, 2026
- City: Paradise, Nevada, United States
- Venue: Horseshoe Las Vegas

Event chronology
← Previous; Fantastica Mania USA	Next → Wrestling Redzone in Hiroshima

Death Vegas Invitational (stylized as Death Vegas Invitacional), was a professional wrestling pay-per-view event produced by New Japan Pro-Wrestling. It took place on April 16, 2026 at Horseshoe Las Vegas in Paradise, Nevada and aired live on Triller TV, while also being simulcasted on NJPW World in conjunction with Game Changer Wrestling's (GCW) Collective.

== Production ==
Other on-screen personnel
Role:	Name:
Commentators	Haruo Murata (Japanese)
Commentators	Maki Itoh (Japanese)
Commentators	Milano Collection A. T. (Japanese)
Commentators	Jordan Castle (English)
Commentators	Veda Scott (English)
Ring announcer	Takuro Shibata

=== Background ===
On June 24, 2025, NJPW held the Death Pain Invitational at Korakuen Hall in Tokyo, Japan and was NJPW's first show which primarily focused on death match wrestling. Prior to this show, NJPW had rarely sanctioned death matches except for one-off occasions like on October 4, 1987 when NJPW owner Antonio Inoki fought Masa Saito in a Ganryujima island death match for 1 hour with the match ending with Inoki getting the win with a TKO. Another death match would be sanctioned on December 18, 1991 on Ganryujima island between Hiroshi Hase and Tiger Jeet Singh which ended with Hase getting the victory. Death matches would continue to be held on occasion including on the Riki Choshu Revival pay-per-view at Yokohama Arena on July 30, 2000 between Atsushi Onita and Riki Choshu, Destruction '09 at the Ryōgoku Kokugikan in Tokyo between Togi Makabe and Takashi Iizuka, on July 30, 2022 during Music City Mayhem at the Nashville Fairgrounds between Jon Moxley and El Desperado, and on July 5, 2023 during Independence Day at Korakuen Hall in Tokyo between Jon Moxley and El Desperado. On January 4, 2026, it was announced that NJPW would hold its first event at the Collective at Horseshoe Las Vegas in Paradise, Nevada on April 16, 2026. On April 5, 2026, NJPW announced that the show would be simulcasted live on NJPW World.

=== Storylines ===
Death Vegas Invitational featured professional wrestling matches that involves different wrestlers from pre-existing scripted feuds and storylines. Wrestlers portrayed villains, heroes, or less distinguishable characters in scripted events that built tension and culminated in a wrestling match or series of matches. Storylines were produced on Game Changer Wrestling and New Japan Pro-Wrestling's various shows.

== Results ==
No.	Results	Stipulations	Times
1	Zack Sabre Jr. defeated Fuminori Abe by pinfall	Singles match	16:50
2	Ishin defeated Effy and Jimmy Lloyd by pinfall	Three-way match	8:19
3	Kushida and Yamato defeated MxM Collection (Mansoor and Mason Madden) and Bustah and The Brain (Alec Price and Jordan Oliver) by pinfall	Runway Rush and Crash A Drop Dead Gorgeous three-way tag team match	10:08
4	El Phantasmo and Maika defeated Dragon Kid and Starlight Kid by pinfall	Tag team match	12:32
5	Gringo Loco and Joey Janela defeated Daisuke Sasaki and Gedo	House Rules hardcore tag team match	18:43
6	The H8 Club (Nick Gage and Matt Tremont) defeated Masashi Takeda and Rina Yamashita, and El Desperado and Jun Kasai by pinfall	Love and Pieces three way tag team deathmatch	14:24
