= CMLL vs. MLW 2 =

2026 Major League Wrestling and Consejo Mundial de Lucha Libre event

- Promotional poster of the event
- Promotion(s): Consejo Mundial de Lucha Libre; Major League Wrestling
- Date: May 1, 2025
- City: Mexico City, Mexico
- Venue: Arena México
- Attendance: 13,000

Event chronology
← Previous; MLW: Fantastica Mania USA; CMLL: Ven a Festejar El Dia del Nino	Next → MLW: Kings of Colosseum; CMLL: Batalla de Naciones

CMLL vs. MLW chronology
← Previous; 1	Next → —

CMLL vs. MLW 2 was a professional wrestling event produced by the American promotion Major League Wrestling (MLW) and the Mexican promotion Consejo Mundial de Lucha Libre (CMLL). It took place on May 1, 2026, at Arena México in Mexico City, Mexico, and was streamed live on CMLL's YouTube channel. It was the second interpromotional show between MLW and CMLL in Mexico.

== Production ==
=== Background ===
On May 2, 2025, CMLL and MLW held a special joint event in Arena México entitled CMLL vs. MLW, featuring interpromotional matches between wrestlers of both promotions. On April 3, 2026, CMLL announced a second collaborative event between it and MLW in Arena México on May 1. MLW would later announce several of its talent for the show, including MLW World Heavyweight Champion Killer Kross and MLW World Women's Featherweight Champion Shotzi, among others. The full card was later announced on April 15, featuring an MLW World Women's Featherweight Championship match between Shotzi and Garra Negra, an MLW World Tag Team Championship match between The Skyscrapers (Donovan Dijak and Bishop Dyer) and Los Infernales (Averno and Euforia), and headlined by a rematch between Kushida and Templario for the MLW World Middleweight Championship.

=== Storylines ===
The card consisted of matches that result from scripted storylines, where wrestlers portray villains, heroes, or less distinguishable characters in scripted events that built tension and culminate in a wrestling match or series of matches, with results predetermined by MLW and CMLL's writers. Storylines are played out at MLW and CMLL events, and across both promotions' social media platforms.

== Results ==
No.	Results	Stipulations	Times
1	Los Hermanos Calavera (Calavera Jr. I and Calavera Jr. II) defeated J-Unit (Ikuro Kwon and Okumura) by submission	Tag team match	8:02
2	Olympia defeated Lady Frost by pinfall	Singles match	9:31
3	Shotzi (c) defeated Garra Negra by pinfall	Singles match for the MLW World Women's Featherweight Championship	7:37
4	The Skyscrapers (Donovan Dijak and Bishop Dyer) (c) defeated Los Infernales (Averno and Euforia) by pinfall	Tag team match for the MLW World Tag Team Championship	14:37
5	Neón defeated Diego Hill by pinfall	Singles match	7:50
6	Ángel de Oro and Soberano Jr. (with KeMalito) defeated Austin Aries and Trevor Lee by pinfall	Tag team match	14:16
7	Templario (with Neón) defeated Kushida (c) (with Ikuro Kwon) by pinfall	Singles match for the MLW World Middleweight Championship	22:53
(c) / – the champion(s) heading into the match
