= The New Beginning in Sapporo (2020) =

Japanese professional wrestling show

- Promotional poster featuring various NJPW wrestlers
- Promotion: New Japan Pro-Wrestling
- Date: February 1-2, 2020
- City: Sapporo, Hokkaido, Japan
- Venue: Hokkaido Prefectural Sports Center
- Attendance: Night 1: 4,569; Night 2: 5,690; Combined: 10,259

Event chronology
← Previous; Fantastica Mania 2020; The New Beginning USA in Atlanta	Next → Road to The New Beginning

The New Beginning chronology
← Previous; USA (2020)	Next → Osaka (2020)

The New Beginning in Sapporo (2020) was a professional wrestling event promoted by New Japan Pro-Wrestling (NJPW). It took place on February 1 and 2, 2020 at the Hokkaido Prefectural Sports Center in Sapporo, Japan.

== Production ==
=== Storylines ===
The New Beginning in Sapporo featured professional wrestling matches that involve different wrestlers from pre-existing scripted feuds and storylines. Wrestlers portray villains, heroes, or less distinguishable characters in the scripted events that build tension and culminate in a wrestling match or series of matches.

== Results ==
=== Night 1 ===
No.	Results	Stipulations	Times
1	Bullet Club (El Phantasmo and Taiji Ishimori) defeated Tiger Mask and Yuya Uemura by submission	Tag team match	8:13
2	Great Bash Heel (Togi Makabe and Tomoaki Honma), and Toa Henare defeated Hiroyoshi Tenzan, Manabu Nakanishi, and Yota Tsuji	Six-man tag team match	9:41
3	Ryusuke Taguchi and Chaos (Sho, Yoh, and Will Ospreay) defeated Suzuki-gun (Zack Sabre Jr., El Desperado, Douki, and Yoshinobu Kanemaru)	Eight-man tag team match	11:45
4	Robbie Eagles and Ryu Lee defeated Los Ingobernables de Japón (Bushi and Hiromu Takahashi) by submission	Tag team match	11:47
5	Bullet Club (Jay White and Kenta) defeated Los Ingobernables de Japón (Tetsuya Naito and Sanada)	Tag team match	18:24
6	Suzuki-gun (Minoru Suzuki and Taichi) defeated Jon Moxley and Kazuchika Okada	Tag team match	17:48
7	Tomohiro Ishii defeated Evil	Singles match	21:14
8	Shingo Takagi defeated Hirooki Goto (c)	Singles match for the NEVER Openweight Championship	20:10
(c) / – the champion(s) heading into the match

=== Night 2 ===
No.	Results	Stipulations	Times
1	Toa Henare defeated Yota Tsuji	Singles match	8:16
2	Hiroyoshi Tenzan, Manabu Nakanishi, and Tiger Mask defeated Great Bash Heel (Togi Makabe and Tomoaki Honma) and Yuya Uemura	Six-man tag team match	9:48
3	El Phantasmo defeated Gabriel Kidd	Singles match	8:50
4	Chaos (Hirooki Goto, Tomohiro Ishii, and Robbie Eagles) defeated Los Ingobernables de Japón (Evil, Shingo Takagi, and Bushi) by submission	Six-man tag team match	9:42
5	Jon Moxley, Roppongi 3K (Sho and Yoh), and Ryusuke Taguchi defeated Suzuki-gun (Minoru Suzuki, Douki, El Desperado, Taka Michinoku, and Yoshinobu Kanemaru) by submission	Eight-man tag team match	12:58
6	Los Ingobernables de Japón (Tetsuya Naito, Sanada, and Hiromu Takahashi) defeated Bullet Club (Jay White, Kenta, and Taiji Ishimori) by submission	Six-man tag team match	15:34
7	Zack Sabre Jr. (c) defeated Will Ospreay by referee stoppage	Singles match for the British Heavyweight Championship	27:04
8	Kazuchika Okada defeated Taichi	Singles match	30:53
(c) / – the champion(s) heading into the match

== See also ==
- 2020 in professional wrestling
- List of NJPW pay-per-view events
