= All Star Junior Festival 2023 =

New Japan Pro-Wrestling pay-per-view event

- All Star Junior Festival 2023 logo
- Promotion: New Japan Pro-Wrestling
- Date: March 1, 2023
- City: Tokyo, Japan
- Venue: Korakuen Hall
- Attendance: 1,381
- Tagline: Junior Dream Festival

Event chronology
← Previous; Battle in the Valley	Next → NJPW 51st Anniversary Show; Multiverse United

All Star Junior Festival chronology
← Previous; First	Next → USA

All Star Junior Festival 2023 was an interpromotional professional wrestling pay-per-view event organized by New Japan Pro-Wrestling (NJPW). It was held on March 1, 2023 at Korakuen Hall in Bunkyo, Tokyo, Japan. The event, which was produced by NJPW wrestler Hiromu Takahashi, featured the participation of junior heavyweight wrestlers from over 20 different promotions from around the world.

In the main event, NJPW's Master Wato defeated All Japan Pro Wrestling's Atsuki Aoyagi. In other prominent matches, Taiji Ishimori defeated Soberano Jr., Shun Skywalker, Ninja Mack, and Yo-Hey in a five-way match and Hiromu Takahashi teamed with Fujita "Jr." Hayato and Amakusa to defeat Hayata, Yamato, and Kazuki Hashimoto.

== Production ==
=== Background ===
On January 23, 2023, New Japan Pro-Wrestling (NJPW) officially announced the All Star Junior Festival. The event is produced by NJPW's Hiromu Takahashi and features junior heavyweight wrestlers from over 20 different Japanese and international promotions.

=== Participating promotions ===
As part of the event's publicity efforts, participants were announced each day throughout the month of February by their respective promotion on Twitter.

Representative	Promotion	Ref.
Chicharito Shoki	Active Advance Pro Wrestling	
Atsuki Aoyagi	All Japan Pro Wrestling	
Black Menso-re	All Japan Pro Wrestling	
Kazuki Hashimoto	Big Japan Pro Wrestling	
Kota Sekifuda	Big Japan Pro Wrestling	
Atlantis Jr.	Consejo Mundial de Lucha Libre	
Soberano Jr.	Consejo Mundial de Lucha Libre	
Místico	Consejo Mundial de Lucha Libre	
Volador Jr.	Consejo Mundial de Lucha Libre	
Mao	DDT Pro-Wrestling	
Yuki Ueno	DDT Pro-Wrestling	
Leona	Dradition	
Dragon Kid	Dragongate	
Shun Skywalker	Dragongate	
Yamato	Dragongate	
Yumehito Imanari	Ganbare☆Pro-Wrestling	
El Lindaman	Gleat	
Minoru Tanaka	Gleat	
Batten×Burabura	Kyushu Pro-Wrestling	
Fujita "Jr." Hayato	Michinoku Pro Wrestling	
Musashi	Michinoku Pro Wrestling	
The Great Sasuke	Michinoku Pro Wrestling	
Bushi	New Japan Pro-Wrestling	
Douki	New Japan Pro-Wrestling	
El Desperado	New Japan Pro-Wrestling	
Hiromu Takahashi	New Japan Pro-Wrestling	
Master Wato	New Japan Pro-Wrestling	
Ryusuke Taguchi	New Japan Pro-Wrestling	
Sho	New Japan Pro-Wrestling	
Taiji Ishimori	New Japan Pro-Wrestling	
Yoshinobu Kanemaru	New Japan Pro-Wrestling	
Billyken Kid	Osaka Pro Wrestling	
Tigers Mask	Osaka Pro Wrestling	
Hikaru Sato	Pancrase Mission	
Isami Kodaka	Pro-Wrestling Basara	
Jun Kasai	Pro Wrestling Freedoms	
Alejandro	Pro Wrestling Noah	
Amakusa	Pro Wrestling Noah	
Hayata	Pro Wrestling Noah	
Ninja Mack	Pro Wrestling Noah	
Yo-Hey	Pro Wrestling Noah	
Hanaoka	Pro-Wrestling Secret Base	
Shoki Kitamura	Pro Wrestling Zero1	
Taka Michinoku	Professional Wrestling Just Tap Out	
Gurukun Mask	Ryukyu Dragon Pro-Wrestling	
Onryo	Wrestling of Darkness 666	
Tatsuhito Takaiwa	Freelancer	

=== Storylines ===
All Star Junior Festival 2023 featured ten professional wrestling matches that involved different wrestlers from pre-existing scripted feuds and storylines. Wrestlers portrayed villains, heroes, or less distinguishable characters in scripted events that built tension and culminated in a wrestling match.

== Results ==
No.	Results	Stipulations	Times
1^{P}	Yoh, Soma Watanabe and Kazuma Sumi defeated Fuminori Abe, Ryo Hoshino and Akira Jumonji	Six-man tag team match	10:35
2	Hiromu Takahashi, Fujita "Jr." Hayato, and Amakusa defeated Hayata, Yamato, and Kazuki Hashimoto	Six-man tag team match	8:52
3	Isami Kodaka and Mao defeated Sho and Onryo (with Ram Kaicho)	Tag team match	9:43
4	Tatsuhito Takaiwa, Yoshinobu Kanemaru, Jun Kasai, Minoru Tanaka, and Taka Michinoku defeated Musashi, Shoki Kitamura, Leona, Chicharito Shoki, and Kota Sekifuda	Ten-man tag team match	10:28
5	Ryusuke Taguchi, Hikaru Sato, and Yumehito Imanari defeated The Great Sasuke, Tigers Mask, and Batten×Burabura (with Taro Nohashi)	Six-man tag team match	7:29
6	El Desperado and Volador Jr. defeated El Lindaman and Yuki Ueno and Los Japoneses Del Mal (Douki and Hanaoka)	Three-way tag team match This match was held under Lucha Libre rules.	10:34
7	Místico, Billyken Kid, Alejandro, and Gurukun Mask (with Teelan Shisa) defeated Dragon Kid, Bushi, Atlantis Jr., and Black Menso-re	Eight-man tag team match	11:29
8	Cima defeated Kazuki Hirata	Singles match	7:16
9	Taiji Ishimori defeated Soberano Jr., Shun Skywalker, Ninja Mack, and Yo-Hey	Five-way match	9:38
10	Master Wato defeated Atsuki Aoyagi	Singles match	14:24
P / – the match was broadcast on the pre-show

== See also ==
- 2023 in professional wrestling
- List of NJPW pay-per-view events
- Sky Diving J
- Super J-Cup
