= The New Beginning in Osaka (2020) =

Japanese professional wrestling show

- Promotional poster featuring Jon Moxley and Minoru Suzuki
- Promotion: New Japan Pro-Wrestling
- Date: February 9, 2020
- City: Osaka, Japan
- Venue: Osaka-jō Hall
- Attendance: 11,411

Event chronology
← Previous; Road to The New Beginning	Next → Tiger Hattori Retirement Event; Dominion in Osaka-jo Hall

The New Beginning chronology
← Previous; Sapporo (2020)	Next → Nagoya

The New Beginning in Osaka (2020) was a professional wrestling pay-per-view (PPV) event, promoted by New Japan Pro-Wrestling (NJPW). It took place on February 9, 2020 at the Osaka-jō Hall in Osaka, Japan.

== Production ==
=== Storylines ===
The New Beginning in Osaka featured professional wrestling matches that involved different wrestlers from pre-existing scripted feuds and storylines. Wrestlers portrayed villains, heroes, or less distinguishable characters in scripted events that built tension and culminated in a wrestling match or series of matches.

At Wrestle Kingdom 14, the IWGP Intercontinental Champion Tetsuya Naito defeated Kazuchika Okada to win the IWGP Heavyweight Championship becoming the first ever dual IWGP Heavyweight and Intercontinental champion. After the match, he was attacked by Kenta, leading to a match at New Year Dash!! as Naito and Los Ingobernables de Japón teammate Sanada would take on Kenta and his Bullet Club partner Jay White, which Naito and Sanada won. After the match, Naito and Sanada were assaulted by Kenta and White, and a match was scheduled for The New Beginning in Osaka, with both championships on the line.

At the 2019 World Tag League final, Jon Moxley made his return to NJPW after an absence and attacked Lance Archer and Minoru Suzuki. At Wrestle Kingdom 14 on January 5, after Moxley had successfully defended his IWGP United States Championship against Juice Robinson, Suzuki confronted Moxley before beating him down and proclaiming he wanted Moxley's title. Later, a match was arranged between the two for the United States Championship at The New Beginning in Osaka.

At the end of New Year Dash!!, while White and Kenta were brutalizing Naito and Sanada, White claimed that Sanada was inferior to himself, leading to a match between the two at The New Beginning in Osaka being set up.

At a press conference on January 7, Manabu Nakanishi announced that he planned to retire on February 22. As part of his farewell tour, it was announced that he would wrestle his final match at Osaka-jo Hall at The New Beginning in Osaka, where he would team with Tencozy (Hiroyoshi Tenzan and Satoshi Kojima) and Yuji Nagata to take on Taguchi Japan (Ryusuke Taguchi, Toa Henare, Tomoaki Honma, and Togi Makabe).

== Results ==
No.	Results	Stipulations	Times
1	Tencozy (Hiroyoshi Tenzan and Satoshi Kojima), Yuji Nagata, and Manabu Nakanishi defeated Taguchi Japan (Ryusuke Taguchi, Toa Henare, Tomoaki Honma, and Togi Makabe)	Eight-man tag team match Manabu Nakanishi's final match at Osaka-jo Hall	7:09
2	Roppongi 3K (Sho and Yoh) (c) (with Rocky Romero) defeated Suzuki-gun (Yoshinobu Kanemaru and El Desperado)	Tag team match for the IWGP Junior Heavyweight Tag Team Championship	16:22
3	Kota Ibushi and Taguchi Japan (Hiroshi Tanahashi, David Finlay, and Juice Robinson) defeated Bullet Club (Chase Owens, Yujiro Takahashi, Tanga Loa, and Tama Tonga) (with Jado and Pieter)	Eight-man tag team match	10:50
4	Chaos (Will Ospreay and Kazuchika Okada) defeated Suzuki-gun (Zack Sabre Jr. and Taichi) (with Miho Abe)	Tag team match	11:50
5	Jay White (with Gedo) defeated Sanada	Singles match	21:52
6	Hiromu Takahashi (c) defeated Ryu Lee	Singles match for the IWGP Junior Heavyweight Championship	23:54
7	Jon Moxley (c) defeated Minoru Suzuki	Singles match for the IWGP United States Championship	17:16
8	Tetsuya Naito (c) defeated Kenta (with Bullet Club (Jay White, Tama Tonga, Tanga Loa, Chase Owens, Yujiro Takahashi, Jado, Gedo))	Singles match for the IWGP Heavyweight Championship and the IWGP Intercontinental Championship	35:50
(c) / – the champion(s) heading into the match

== See also ==
- 2020 in professional wrestling
- List of NJPW pay-per-view events
