= CMLL vs. MLW =

2025 Major League Wrestling and Consejo Mundial de Lucha Libre event

- Promotional poster of the event
- Promotion(s): Consejo Mundial de Lucha Libre; Major League Wrestling
- Date: May 2, 2025
- City: Mexico City, Mexico
- Venue: Arena México
- Attendance: 11,000

Event chronology
| ← Previous; MLW: Battle Riot VII; CMLL: Pekes Funcion Del Dia Del Nino | Next → MLW + CMLL: Azteca Lucha |

CMLL vs. MLW chronology
| ← Previous; First | Next → 2 |

CMLL vs. MLW was a professional wrestling event produced by the American promotion Major League Wrestling (MLW) and the Mexican promotion Consejo Mundial de Lucha Libre (CMLL). It took place on May 2, 2025 and was streamed live on CMLL's YouTube channel.

== Production ==
=== Background ===
On March 27, 2025, CMLL had announced in a joint statement with MLW that they would be holding a special show at Arena México titled CMLL vs. MLW. The announcement also listed several matches for the card including an MLW World Tag Team Championship match between CozyMax (Okumura and Satoshi Kojima) and Los Depredadores (Magnus and Rugido), and an MLW National Openweight Championship match between Ultimo Guerrero and Matthew Justice. Mistico vs. Kushida was announced as the main event of the show.

=== Storylines ===
The card consisted of matches that result from scripted storylines, where wrestlers portray villains, heroes, or less distinguishable characters in scripted events that built tension and culminate in a wrestling match or series of matches, with results predetermined by MLW and CMLL's writers. Storylines are played out at MLW and CMLL events, and across both promotions' social media platforms.

== Results ==
| No. | Results | Stipulations | Times |
|---|---|---|---|
| 1 | Reyna Isis defeated Alejandra Quintanilla | Singles match | 11:34 |
| 2 | Donovan Dijak and Ikuro Kwon defeated Galeon Fantasma (Barboza and Zandokan Jr.) | Tag team match | 11:16 |
| 3 | Los Depredadores (Magnus and Rugido) defeated CozyMax (Okumura and Satoshi Kojima) (c) | Tag team match for the MLW World Tag Team Championship | 11:48 |
| 4 | Neón vs. Paul London ended in a time limit draw | Lightning match | 10:00 |
| 5 | Último Guerrero defeated Matthew Justice (c) | Singles match for the MLW National Openweight Championship | 19:03 |
| 6 | Místico defeated Kushida | Singles match | 19:08 |
(c) / – the champion(s) heading into the match
