= All Star Junior Festival USA 2023 =

New Japan Pro-Wrestling pay-per-view event

- All Star Junior Festival USA 2023 logo
- Promotion: New Japan Pro-Wrestling
- Date: August 19, 2023
- City: Philadelphia, Pennsylvania
- Venue: 2300 Arena
- Attendance: 672

Event chronology
← Previous; G1 Climax 33	Next → Multiverse United 2

All Star Junior Festival chronology
← Previous; All Star Junior Festival 2023	Next → —

All Star Junior Festival USA 2023 was an interpromotional professional wrestling event organized by New Japan Pro-Wrestling (NJPW) that aired on NJPW World pay-per-view. It took place on August 19, 2023, at the 2300 Arena in Philadelphia, Pennsylvania. The event was produced by NJPW wrestlers Hiromu Takahashi and Rocky Romero, and featured the participation of junior heavyweight wrestlers representing various promotions from around the world.

== Production ==
=== Background ===
On April 16, 2023, New Japan Pro-Wrestling (NJPW) officially announced the All Star Junior USA Festival. The event was produced by NJPW's Hiromu Takahashi and Rocky Romero, and featured junior heavyweight wrestlers from different Japanese and international promotions.

=== Participating promotions ===
As part of the event's publicity efforts, participants were announced each day throughout the months of July and August by NJPW on Twitter.

Representative	Promotion	Ref.
Matt Sydal	All Elite Wrestling	
Nick Wayne	All Elite Wrestling	
Fugaz	Consejo Mundial de Lucha Libre	
Soberano Jr.	Consejo Mundial de Lucha Libre	
Mao	DDT Pro-Wrestling	
Dragon Kid	Dragongate	
Shun Skywalker	Dragongate	
Blake Christian	Game Changer Wrestling	
Jack Cartwheel	Game Changer Wrestling	
Jordan Oliver	Game Changer Wrestling	
Starboy Charlie	Game Changer Wrestling	
Ace Austin	Impact Wrestling	
Alex Shelley	Impact Wrestling	
Chris Bey	Impact Wrestling	
Lio Rush	Impact Wrestling	
Mike Bailey	Impact Wrestling	
Rich Swann	Impact Wrestling	
Goldy	Monster Factory Pro Wrestling	
Bushi	New Japan Pro-Wrestling	
Clark Connors	New Japan Pro-Wrestling	
Douki	New Japan Pro-Wrestling	
El Desperado	New Japan Pro-Wrestling	
Francesco Akira	New Japan Pro-Wrestling	
Hiromu Takahashi	New Japan Pro-Wrestling	
Kevin Knight	New Japan Pro-Wrestling	
Kosei Fujita	New Japan Pro-Wrestling	
Master Wato	New Japan Pro-Wrestling	
Robbie Eagles	New Japan Pro-Wrestling	
Rocky Romero	New Japan Pro-Wrestling	
Ryusuke Taguchi	New Japan Pro-Wrestling	
The DKC	New Japan Pro-Wrestling	
TJP	New Japan Pro-Wrestling	
Yoh	New Japan Pro-Wrestling	
Yoshinobu Kanemaru	New Japan Pro-Wrestling	
Cheeseburger	Ring of Honor	
KC Navarro	Warrior Wrestling	
Low Rider	Freelancer	
Real1	Freelancer	
Vinny Pacifico	Freelancer	

=== Storylines ===
The event featured ten professional wrestling matches, which involved different wrestlers from pre-existing scripted feuds, plots, and storylines. Wrestlers portrayed heroes, villains, or less distinguishable characters in scripted events that built tension and culminated in a wrestling match. Storylines were produced on New Japan's television program.

== Results ==
No.	Results	Stipulations	Times
1^{P}	Goldy defeated Vinny Pacifico	Singles match	8:20
2	Matt Sydal and Yoh defeated Bushi and Shun Skywalker	Tag team match	8:55
3	Kevin Knight defeated Clark Connors	First round singles match in the All Star Jr. Festival USA tournament	9:58
4	Mike Bailey defeated Francesco Akira	First round singles match in the All Star Jr. Festival USA tournament	13:31
5	Rich Swann, Ryusuke Taguchi and The DKC defeated Jack Cartwheel, Real1 and Starboy Charlie	Six-man tag team match	15:08
6	Alex Shelley, Chris Bey, Kosei Fujita, and Robbie Eagles defeated Ace Austin, Cheeseburger, TJP, and Yoshinobu Kanemaru	Lucky Dip Eight-man tag team match	17:00
7	Soberano Jr. defeated Dragon Kid, Fugaz, KC Navarro and Lio Rush	Five-way match	7:15
8	El Desperado and Mao defeated East West Express (Jordan Oliver and Nick Wayne)	Tag team match	19:14
9	Douki and Low Rider defeated Hiromu Takahashi and Rocky Romero, and Blake Christian and Master Wato	Triple threat tag team ladder match for the Pat's King of Steaks Philly Cheesesteak Cup	19:27
10	Mike Bailey defeated Kevin Knight	Finals singles match in the All Star Jr. Festival USA tournament	19:53
P / – the match was broadcast on the pre-show

=== All Star Jr. Festival USA tournament ===
The All Star Jr. Festival USA four-man tournament took place on August 19, 2023.

Semifinals; All Star Junior Festival (August 19)
Kevin Knight	Pin
Clark Connors	9:58
Francesco Akira	13:31
Mike Bailey	Pin

Final; All Star Junior Festival (August 19)
Kevin Knight	19:53
Mike Bailey	Pin

== See also ==
- 2023 in professional wrestling
- List of NJPW pay-per-view events
