= NJPW Music City Mayhem =

Music City Mayhem
- Promotional poster featuring Jon Moxley, El Desperado, Shota Umino, and Hiroshi Tanahashi
- Promotion: New Japan Pro-Wrestling
- Date: July 30, 2022
- City: Nashville, Tennessee, United States
- Venue: Nashville Fairgrounds

Event chronology
← Previous; G1 Climax 32: Night 7	Next → G1 Climax 32: Night 8

Music City Mayhem was a professional wrestling pay-per-view event produced by New Japan Pro-Wrestling (NJPW). It took place on July 30, 2022 at the Nashville Fairgrounds in Nashville, Tennessee and was streamed live on FITE TV. The show was part of the Starrcast V convention which took place during SummerSlam weekend.

== Production ==
=== Background ===
Since 1982, NJPW had occasionally sanction death match wrestling like on October 4, 1987 when NJPW owner Antonio Inoki fought Masa Saito in a Ganryujima island death match for 1 hour with the match ending with Inoki getting the win with a TKO. Another death match would be sanctioned on December 18, 1991 on Ganryujima island between Hiroshi Hase and Tiger Jeet Singh which ended with Hase getting the victory. Death matches would continue to be held on occasion including on the Riki Choshu Revival pay-per-view at Yokohama Arena on July 30, 2000 between Atsushi Onita and Riki Choshu, Destruction '09 at the Ryōgoku Kokugikan in Tokyo between Togi Makabe and Takashi Iizuka,

On June 24, 2022, NJPW announced that they would hold a pay-per-view event titled Music City Mayhem at the Nashville Fairgrounds in Nashville, Tennessee and that it would be part of the Starrcast V professional wrestling fan convention. On July 7, 2022, NJPW confimred that All Elite Wrestling wrestler Jon Moxley would face El Desperado in a no Limit, no Disqualification match during the event. On July 13, 2022, NJPW announced several matches which would take place during the event including Kushida vs. Alex Shelley, FTR and Alex Zayne vs. United Empire (Kyle Fletcher, TJP and Mark Davis) in a six man tag team match, Yuya Uemura, Fred Yehi, and Shota Umino vs. Ren Narita, The DKC, and Kevin Knight in a six man tag team match, Blake Christian vs. Hiromu Takahashi, and Davey Richards (c) vs. Clark Connors for the MLW National Openweight Championship. On July 23, 2022, NJPW announced that Clark Connors would be unable to compete at Music City Mayhem and an upcoming NJPW Strong special taping titled "High Alert" in Charlotte, North Carolina due to an injury. Connors would be replaced by Rocky Romero as Richards' opponent.

=== Storylines ===
NJPW Music City Mayhem featured professional wrestling matches that involves different wrestlers from pre-existing scripted feuds and storylines. Wrestlers portrayed villains, heroes, or less distinguishable characters in scripted events that built tension and culminated in a wrestling match or series of matches. Storylines were produced on New Japan Pro-Wrestling's various shows.

== Results ==
No.	Results	Stipulations	Times
1	Fred Yehi, Yuya Uemura, and Shota Umino defeated Kevin Knight, Ren Narita, and The DKC by pinfall	Six man tag team match	13:12
2	Davey Richards defeated Rocky Romero by pinfall	Singles match for the MLW National Openweight Championship	11:29
3	Fred Rosser (c) defeated Big Damo by pinfall	Singles match for the NJPW Strong Openweight Championship	13:01
4	Hiromu Takahashi defeated Blake Christian by pinfall	Singles match	13:59
5	United Empire (Kyle Fletcher, Mark Davis and TJP) defeated Alex Zayne and FTR (Cash Wheeler and Dax Harwood) by pinfall	Six man tag team match	14:30
6	Kushida vs. Alex Shelley ended in a time limit draw	Singles match	20:00
7	Jon Moxley defeated El Desperado by referee's decision	No disqualification match	17:20
(c) / – the champion(s) heading into the match
