= Fantastica Mania USA (2026) =

Professional wrestling event in Charleston, South Carolina

- Promotional poster
- Promotion(s): Major League Wrestling; Consejo Mundial de Lucha Libre; New Japan Pro-Wrestling
- Date: April 12, 2026 (aired July 18, July 25, and August 1, 2026)
- City: Charleston, South Carolina
- Venue: Festival Hall

Event chronology
← Previous; Lucha Apocalypto (MLW); Sakura Genesis (NJPW); Homenaje A Dos Leyendas (CMLL)	Next → CMLL vs. MLW 2 (MLW); Death Vegas Invitational (NJPW); Global Wars Cincinnati (CMLL)

Fantastica Mania USA chronology
← Previous; 2024	Next → —

Fantastica Mania USA was a professional wrestling event co-produced by Major League Wrestling (MLW), Consejo Mundial de Lucha Libre (CMLL), and New Japan Pro-Wrestling (NJPW). It took place on April 12, 2026 at Festival Hall in Charleston, South Carolina.

The event served as a taping for MLW Fusion, with additional matches airing as part of the Blood and Thunder special episode on August 8, 2026.

== Production ==
=== Background ===
The Fantastica Mania event series was the result of the partnership between Japanese-based New Japan Pro-Wrestling (NJPW) and Mexican Consejo Mundial de Lucha Libre (CMLL) promotions who had been exchanging talent for short or long periods of time for several years before 2011.

On May 11, 2024, NJPW had announced that they would be bringing their cross-promotional Fantastica Mania show to the United States for the first time at the Mt. Pleasant High School in San Jose, California. The event was streamed live on NJPW World as a pay-per-view event with Veda Scott and Miguel Castro on commentary and the main event match being a Revelos Increibles tag team match featuring Douki and Mistico fighting against Rocky Romero and Volador Jr..

On January 19, 2026, MLW announced that they would be co-producing the 2026 edition of Fantastica Mania USA and that it would serve as a television taping for their weekly show, MLW Fusion.

=== Storylines ===
The card consisted of matches that result from scripted storylines, where wrestlers portrayed villains, heroes, or less distinguishable characters in scripted events that built tension and culminate in a wrestling match or series of matches, with results predetermined by MLW, NJPW, and CMLL's writers. Storylines were played out at MLW, NJPW, and CMLL events, and across the promotions' social media platforms along with MLW's weekly show MLW Fusion.

== Results ==
Week 1 (July 18)
No.	Results	Stipulations	Times
1	Kushida (c) defeated Templario, Alan Angels, and Taiji Ishimori by pinfall	Four-way match for the MLW World Middleweight Championship	8:43
2	LaBron Kozone defeated Manny Lo by pinfall	Singles match	2:46
3	The Skyscrapers (Donovan Dijak, Bishop Dyer, and Josh Bishop) defeated Contra Mercs (Mads Krule Krügger, Doc Gallows and Karl Anderson) (with Shotzi Blackheart) by pinfall	Six-man tag team match	9:35
(c) / – the champion(s) heading into the match

Week 2 (July 25)
No.	Results	Stipulations	Times
1	LaBron Kozone defeated Andrew Everett by pinfall	Singles match	6:27
2	Zamaya defeated Priscilla Kelly by pinfall	Singles match	3:05
3	Matt Riddle defeated Josh Bishop by pinfall	Singles match	6:33

Week 3 (August 1)
No.	Results	Stipulations	Times
1	Místico, Diego Hill, and El Desperado defeated Austin Aries, Último Guerrero, and Douki by submission	Six-man tag team match	13:26
2	Glasgow Boys On Top (Mark Coffey and Wolfgang) (with Joe Coffey) defeated J-Unit (Ikuro Kwon and Okumura) by pinfall	Tag team match	3:38
3	Mads Krule Krügger vs. Big Damo ended in a no contest	Singles match	6:11

Blood and Thunder (August 8)
No.	Results	Stipulations	Times
1	Lady Frost defeated Shotzi Blackheart and Scarlett Bordeaux by pinfall	Three-way match	8:09
2	Joe Coffey (with Mark Coffey and Wolfgang) defeated Alan Angels) by pinfall	Singles match	3:36
3	Killer Kross (c) defeated Satoshi Kojima by submission	Singles match for the MLW World Heavyweight Championship	8:48
(c) / – the champion(s) heading into the match
