= Arena México =

Arena in Mexico City, Mexico

- La Catedral de la Lucha Libre; La México
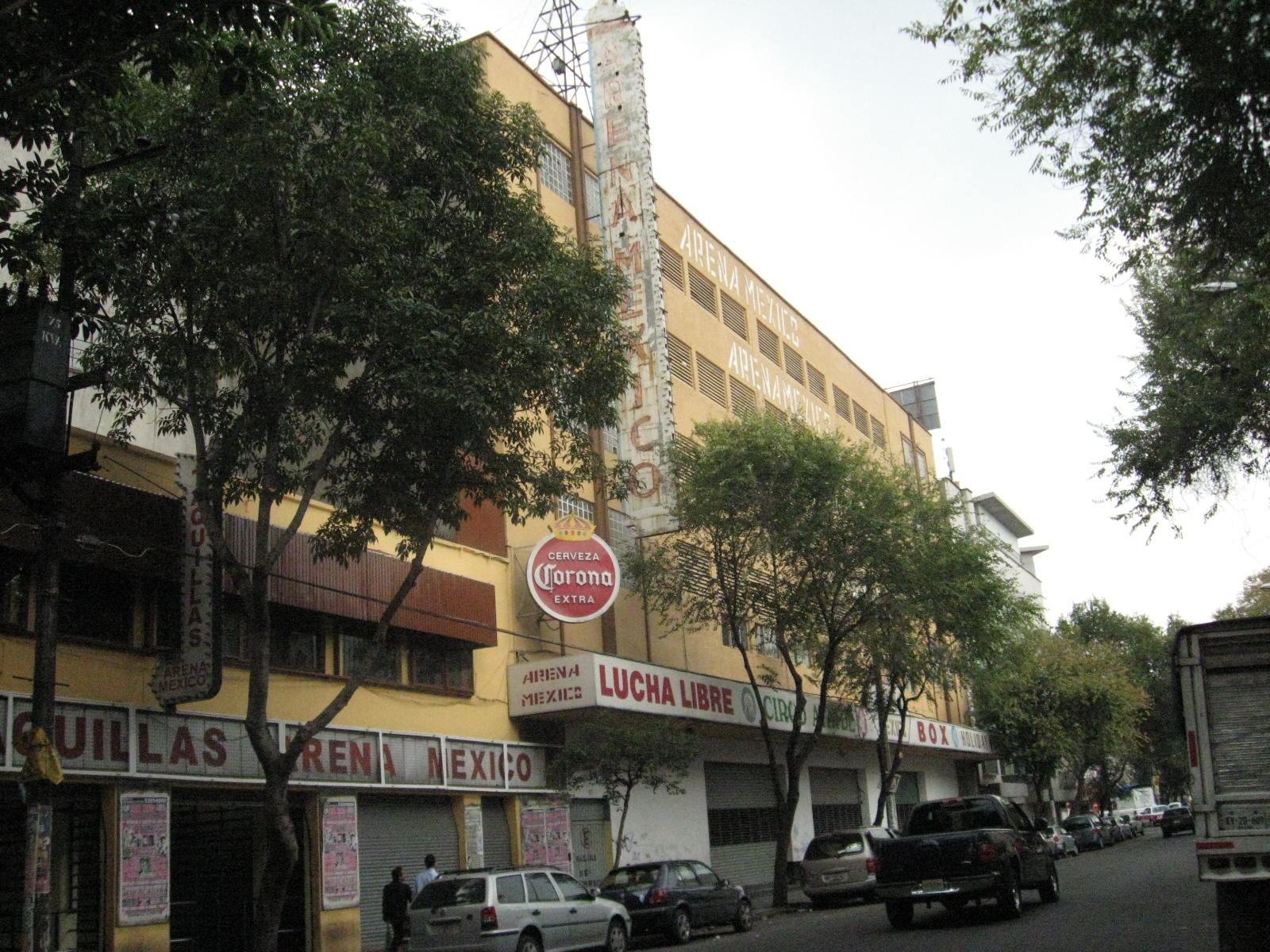
- Arena Mexico as seen from calle Dr Lavista
- Interactive map of Arena México
- Former names: Arena Modelo (1910s–1950s)
- Location: 189 Calle Dr. Lavista, Colonia Doctores, Mexico City, 06720
- Coordinates: 19°25′29″N 99°9′7″W
- Owner: Consejo Mundial de Lucha Libre (CMLL)
- Capacity: 16,500 (Professional wrestling, Boxing)

Construction
- Opened: 1956 (modern building)

Tenants
- Empresa Mexicana de Lucha Libre (1956–1989); Consejo Mundial de Lucha Libre (1990–present)

Arena México is an indoor arena in Mexico City, Mexico, located in the Colonia Doctores neighborhood in the Cuauhtémoc borough. The arena is primarily used for professional wrestling, shows promoted by the promotion Consejo Mundial de Lucha Libre (CMLL). The building is called the "cathedral of lucha libre mexicana". Arena México has a seating capacity of 16,500 when configured for professional wrestling or boxing events. The current building was completed in 1956, built by Salvador Lutteroth, owner of CMLL at the time and is the largest arena built specifically for wrestling. The building was used as the venue for the boxing competition at the 1968 Summer Olympics, and throughout the last half of the 20th century hosted several large boxing events. The arena also serves as the headquarters for CMLL.

== History ==
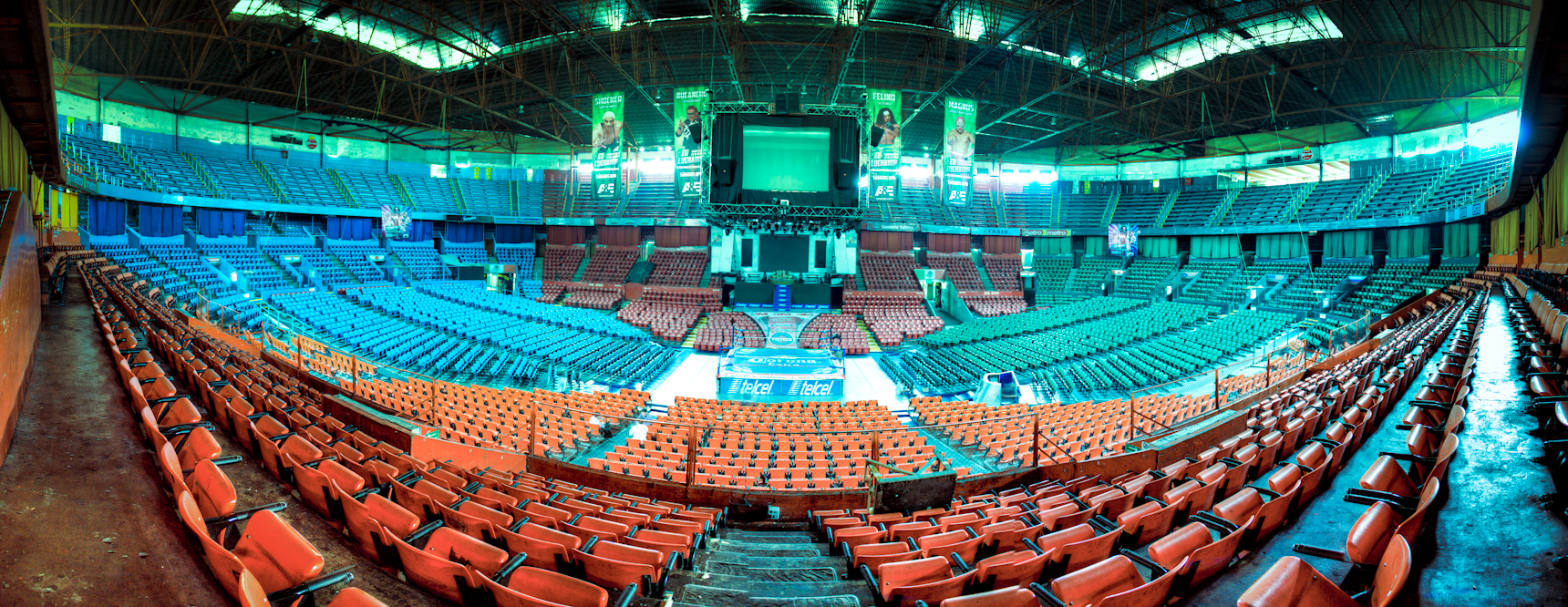
An empty Arena México configured for wrestling

The location was originally a general-purpose arena called Arena Modelo. Arena Modelo was built in the 1910s or 1920s for boxing events. By the early 1930s the arena was abandoned until professional wrestling promoter Salvador Lutteroth began promoting wrestling, or Lucha libre events in Arena Modelo on September 21, 1933. For the next ten years it served as the main venue for Lutteroth's promotion Empresa Mexicana de Lucha Libre (EMLL) until Lutteroth commissioned the construction of Arena Coliseo in Mexico City. After Arena Coliseo opened in 1943, Arena Model served as the location for EMLL's wrestling school. By 1953 even Arena Coliseo was too small for the crowds EMLL's shows were attracting, Lutteroth promised to "build the largest wrestling arena in the world" on the site of Arena Modelo and construction started not long after.

Arena México, as it was renamed, stood complete in 1956 and is still the largest arena built specifically for professional wrestling. From 1956 and forward Arena México has been the main venue for EMLL and all of their Anniversary shows. In 1968 it was selected to be the location of the boxing competition at the 1968 Summer Olympics that was held in Mexico City. Since its construction, Arena Mexico had been hosting boxing shows on a regular basis and following the refurbishment for the Olympic Games, several major boxing events have been held at Arena Mexico, hosting several world title bouts. In 1990, EMLL was renamed Consejo Mundial de Lucha Libre (CMLL), retaining ownership of the arena.

== Present operations ==
Arena México hosts twice weekly wrestling events promoted by CMLL. On Tuesdays they present "CMLL Martes Arena Mexico" (CMLL Arena Mexico Tuesday) and on Fridays they present "CMLL Super Viernes" (CMLL Super Friday), which is the promotions primary event, taped for television. Arena México also hosts all of CMLL's feature events and pay-per-view shows and have done so since the arena opened in 1956. On May 2, 2025, CMLL co-produced a special event with American promotion Major League Wrestling titled CMLL vs. MLW, marking the first time that an American professional wrestling promotion has produced a show from the arena. On June 18, 2025, All Elite Wrestling (AEW) held their first wrestling show in Mexico with its television special, Grand Slam Mexico. Since 2023, CMLL has also held their annual Fantastica Mania Mexico show in partnership with the Japanese professional wrestling promotion New Japan Pro-Wrestling.

== As a boxing venue ==
From the 1950s to near the end of the 20th century, Arena Mexico was a major venue for boxing as well. During this time, all of Mexico's boxing greats, except Julio César Chávez have fought here. Some of those that have include Rubén Olivares, Chucho Castillo, Carlos Zárate Serna, Pipino Cuevas, Julio Guerrero, Famoso Gómez, Memo Téllez, Miguel Castro and Raúl Rodríguez. Arena Mexico was the scene of some of "Púas" Rubén Olivares major victories and it was the scene of his last fight, when he was beaten by newcomer Ignacio Madrid. Most of the biggest fights fought in Mexico during the 1960s to 1970s period took place here.

One notable world championship fight occurred here in 1989, when Ghanaian Nana Konadu fought Mexican Gilberto Román in the superflyweight division. No one anticipated a chance for Konadu, but he won.

From 2000 to 2008, there had not been a world-class championship fight in Arena Mexico. However, it returned when Mexican Jorge "Travieso" Arce beat Panamanian Rafael Concepción in the super flyweight division and Mexican Jackie Nava beat Argentinian Betina Garino in the female bantamweight division.

== As a MMA venue ==
In December 2017, the mixed martial arts promotion Xtreme Fighters Latino announced its move to Arena México, for the XFL 36 event, whose main event was between Montserrat Ruiz and Sarai Saenz Flores for the XFL strawweight championship. The event also featured foreign participation, when Brazilian Alessandro Costa faced Daniel Corona in a flyweight fight.

== See also ==
- Aniversario de Arena México
