= Ganryū-jima =

Island in Japan between Honshū and Kyūshū

Coordinates: 33°56′00″N 130°55′49″E

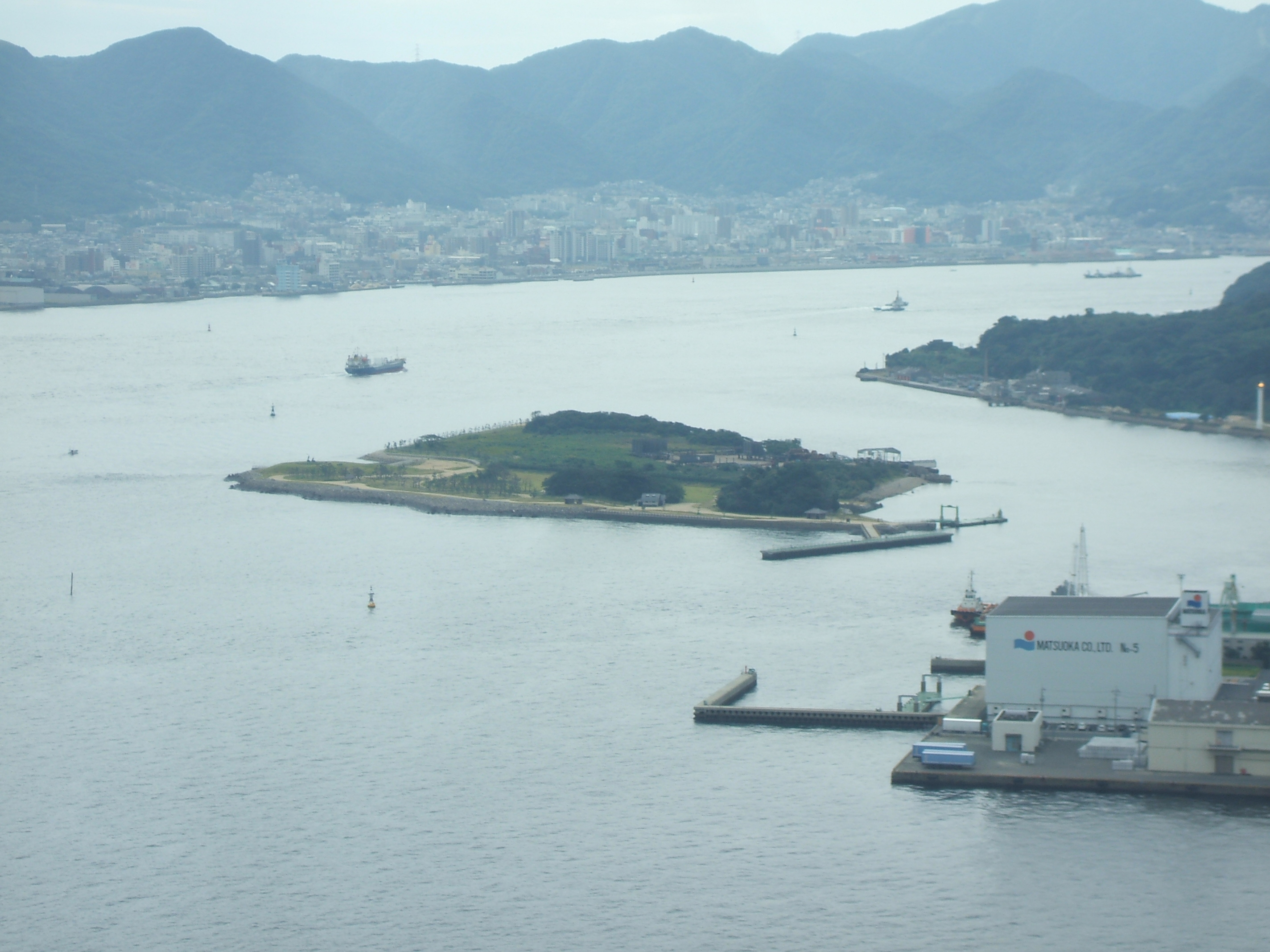
View of Ganryū-jima island

Ganryū-jima (巌流島; formerly Funa-jima 船島) is an island in Japan located between Honshū and Kyūshū, and accessible via ferry from Shimonoseki Harbor (下関港).

== Name ==
It is famous for the duel between Miyamoto Musashi and Sasaki Kojirō. The small island was named for its boat-like appearance, and later came to be called after the Ganryū kenjutsu school Kojirō had founded.

== Features ==
On the island are a few monuments as well as facilities for public gatherings such as an annual tug-of-war. Along the west coast is a walking path.

== Industry ==
The western half of the island is currently being used by Mitsubishi Heavy Industries as a storage facility for its ship manufacturing and drydocks in Shimonoseki across the harbor.

== Sports hosting ==
New Japan Pro-Wrestling held two matches on the island. On October 4, 1987, Antonio Inoki defeated Masa Saito. On December 18, 1991, Hiroshi Hase defeated Tiger Jeet Singh.
