= Global Wars 2017 =

Professional wrestling tour

- Promotion(s): New Japan Pro-Wrestling; Ring of Honor
- Date: October 12, 2017; October 13, 2017; October 14, 2017; October 15, 2017
- City: Buffalo, New York; Pittsburgh, Pennsylvania; Columbus, Ohio; Villa Park, Illinois
- Venue: Buffalo RiverWorks; Stage AE; Express Live! Odeum Expo Center

Event chronology
← Previous (ROH) Death Before Dishonor XV / (NJPW) King of Pro-Wrestling; Lion's Gate Project 8	Next → (ROH) Philadelphia Excellence / (NJPW) Road to Power Struggle

Global Wars chronology
← Previous; 2016	Next → 2018

Global Wars 2017 was a professional wrestling tour co-produced by the American Ring of Honor (ROH) and Japanese New Japan Pro-Wrestling (NJPW) promotions. The tour's four events took place on October 12 at Buffalo RiverWorks in Buffalo, New York, October 13 at Stage AE in Pittsburgh, Pennsylvania, October 14 at Express Live! in Columbus, Ohio, and October 15 at Odeum Expo Center in Villa Park, Illinois.

This was the fourth year in which ROH and NJPW co-produced shows under the Global Wars name.

== Production ==
=== Background ===
In 2014, the American Ring of Honor (ROH) and Japanese New Japan Pro-Wrestling (NJPW) announced a partnership as part of which they held the first Global Wars show on May 10, 2014, in Toronto, Ontario, Canada. Global Wars, along with War of the Worlds, became an annual tradition. In 2015, the promotions held two Global Wars shows, both in Toronto. In 2016, Global Wars was held as a one-night pay-per-view (PPV) in Chicago Ridge, Illinois. While all the previous Global Wars had taken place in May, in 2017, the event was moved to October and turned into a tour. Originally it was announced on July 14 as a three-show tour, taking place in Buffalo, New York; Pittsburgh, Pennsylvania, and Columbus, Ohio, before a fourth show in Villa Park, Illinois, was added on July 31.

The first batch of wrestlers announced for the tour included Hiromu Takahashi, Killer Elite Squad (Davey Boy Smith Jr. and Lance Archer), Kushida and Yoshi-Hashi from NJPW and The Briscoes (Jay Briscoe and Mark Briscoe), Bully Ray, Cody, Dalton Castle and the Boys, Jay Lethal and The Young Bucks (Matt Jackson and Nick Jackson) from ROH. On July 31, ROH added NJPW wrestler Kenny Omega to the tour's final event in Villa Park, Illinois. Originally, the promotion announced that Omega would be defending the IWGP United States Heavyweight Championship at the show, but later retracted the title match announcement. The Omega announcement led to the final show becoming the fastest selling event in ROH history with 1,875 tickets being sold the first day. On September 22, ROH announced that Omega would work all four of the Global Wars events. Three days later, ROH again announced that Omega would defend the IWGP United States Heavyweight Championship on October 15. On September 29, ROH announced that Minoru Suzuki would take part in all four shows of the tour, which was followed by similar announcements for Will Ospreay and Toru Yano the following day. On October 2, ROH announced that the final night of the tour would air live on internet pay-per-view (iPPV). In addition, the second and third night of the tour would be available on free live streams for all members of ROH's Ringside service.

=== Storylines ===
The Global Wars 2017 shows featured professional wrestling matches that involved different wrestlers from pre-existing scripted feuds and storylines. Wrestlers portrayed villains, heroes, or less distinguishable characters in the scripted events that built tension and culminated in a wrestling match or series of matches.

On September 26, 2017, ROH announced the first match for the tour, which would see Kenny Omega defend the IWGP United States Heavyweight Championship against Yoshi-Hashi on October 15. The match was set up on September 24 at NJPW's Destruction in Kobe show, where Yoshi-Hashi challenged Omega after he had successfully defended his title against Juice Robinson. Omega initially dismissed the challenge, but then accepted it, considering Yoshi-Hashi "great warm up". The history between the two dated back to 2016, when Yoshi-Hashi defeated Omega during the 2016 G1 Climax. The two later had a rematch, where Omega successfully defended the Tokyo Dome IWGP Heavyweight Championship challenge rights certificate against Yoshi-Hashi. This match would mark the first time the IWGP United States Heavyweight Championship would be defended in the United States.

== Results ==
=== Global Wars: Buffalo ===
No.	Results	Stipulations
1^{P}	Deonna Purrazzo defeated Sumie Sakai	Singles match
2	The Dawgs (Rhett Titus and Will Ferrara) defeated Coast 2 Coast (LSG and Shaheem Ali)	Tag team match
3	Kushida defeated Adam Page	Singles match
4	Jay Lethal defeated Frankie Kazarian	Singles match
5	Suzuki-gun (Davey Boy Smith Jr., Lance Archer and Minoru Suzuki) defeated Mark Briscoe and War Machine (Hanson and Raymond Rowe)	Six-man tag team match
6	Mandy Leon defeated Jenny Rose	Singles match
7	Hiromu Takahashi defeated Christopher Daniels	Singles match
8	Bullet Club (Cody and Marty Scurll) defeated Chaos (Toru Yano and Yoshi-Hashi)	Tag team match
9	Punishment Martinez defeated Will Ospreay	Singles match
10	The Elite (Kenny Omega, Matt Jackson and Nick Jackson) (c) defeated The Kingdom (Matt Taven, T. K. O'Ryan and Vinny Marseglia)	Six-man tag team match for the ROH World Six-Man Tag Team Championship
(c) / – the champion(s) heading into the match; P / – the match was broadcast on the pre-show

=== Global Wars: Pittsburgh ===
No.	Results	Stipulations
1^{D}	Coast 2 Coast (LSG and Shaheem Ali) defeated One Mean Team (Brian Johnson and Justin Pusser) (with Miss Jasmine)	Tag team match
2	Hiromu Takahashi defeated Mark Briscoe	Singles match
3	Best Friends (Beretta and Chuckie T.) defeated The Dawgs (Rhett Titus and Will Ferrara)	Tag team match
4	Jay Lethal defeated Jay White	Singles match
5	The Motor City Machine Guns (Alex Shelley and Chris Sabin) (c) defeated The Kingdom (T. K. O'Ryan and Vinny Marseglia) and The Young Bucks (Matt Jackson and Nick Jackson)	Three-way tag team match for the ROH World Tag Team Championship
6	Deonna Purrazzo, Jenny Rose and Mandy Leon defeated Britt Baker, Faye Jackson and Sumie Sakai	Six-woman tag team match
7	Kenny King defeated Adam Page, Josh Woods, Kushida, Matt Taven and Punishment Martinez	Proving Ground Instant Reward six-way match
8	War Machine (Hanson and Raymond Rowe) defeated Killer Elite Squad (Davey Boy Smith Jr. and Lance Archer)	Tag team match
9	Minoru Suzuki defeated Silas Young (with Beer City Bruiser)	Singles match
10	Luxury Trio (Cody, Kenny Omega and Marty Scurll) (c) defeated Chaos (Toru Yano, Will Ospreay and Yoshi-Hashi)	Six-man tag team match for the ROH World Six-Man Tag Team Championship
(c) / – the champion(s) heading into the match; D / – this was a dark match

=== Global Wars: Columbus ===
No.	Results	Stipulations
1	The Addiction (Christopher Daniels and Frankie Kazarian) defeated Search and Destroy (Jay White and Jonathan Gresham)	Tag team match
2	Jay Lethal defeated Hiromu Takahashi	Singles match
3	The Motor City Machine Guns (Alex Shelley and Chris Sabin) (c) defeated Beer City Bruiser and Silas Young	Tag team match for the ROH World Tag Team Championship
4	Chaos (Toru Yano, Will Ospreay and Yoshi-Hashi) defeated Suzuki-gun (Davey Boy Smith Jr., Lance Archer and Minoru Suzuki)	Six-man tag team match
5	Sumie Sakai defeated Holidead	Singles match
6	Shane Taylor defeated Josh Woods	Singles match
7	Colt Cabana and Kenny King defeated Bullet Club (Adam Page and Marty Scurll)	Tag team match
8	Cody (c) defeated Kushida	Singles match for the ROH World Championship
9	The Elite (Kenny Omega, Matt Jackson and Nick Jackson) (c) defeated Best Friends (Beretta and Chuckie T.) and Flip Gordon	Six-man tag team match for the ROH World Six-Man Tag Team Championship
(c) / – the champion(s) heading into the match

=== Global Wars: Chicago ===
No.	Results	Stipulations
1	Beer City Bruiser and Silas Young defeated Best Friends (Beretta and Chuckie T.)	Tag team match
2	Marty Scurll defeated Hiromu Takahashi	Singles match
3	The Addiction (Christopher Daniels and Frankie Kazarian) defeated Cheeseburger and Kushida	Tag team match
4	Bullet Club (Adam Page, Cody, Matt Jackson and Nick Jackson) defeated Search and Destroy (Alex Shelley, Chris Sabin, Jay White and Jonathan Gresham)	Eight-man tag team match
5	The Dawgs (Rhett Titus and Will Ferrara) defeated One Mean Team (Brian Johnson and Justin Pusser) (with Miss Jasmine)	Tag team match
6	Suzuki-gun (Davey Boy Smith Jr., Lance Archer and Minoru Suzuki) defeated Jay Lethal, Kenny King and Shane Taylor	Six-man tag team match
7	Colt Cabana defeated Toru Yano	Singles match
8	Will Ospreay defeated Flip Gordon	Singles match
9	Kenny Omega (c) defeated Yoshi-Hashi	Singles match for the IWGP United States Heavyweight Championship
(c) / – the champion(s) heading into the match

== See also ==
- 2017 in professional wrestling
