= Global Wars =

Professional wrestling event

- Logo used since 2016
- Promotions: Ring of Honor; Pro Wrestling Noah (2013); New Japan Pro-Wrestling (2014–2018); Consejo Mundial de Lucha Libre (2019, 2025); All Elite Wrestling (2025–present); Metroplex Wrestling (2026); Maple Leaf Pro Wrestling (2026); World Wonder Ring Stardom (2026)
- Other names: Border Wars (2012–2013); Global Wars Espectacular (2019)
- First event: Border Wars (2012)

Global Wars is a professional wrestling event staged by the American professional wrestling promotion Ring of Honor (ROH), first promoted in 2012 and most recently in 2026. Originally named Border Wars, the event was renamed Global Wars in 2014 after ROH brokered a partnership with the Japanese promotion New Japan Pro-Wrestling (NJPW).

Under the new name, the event became a "super show" co-produced by the two promotions. The first five were held at the Ted Reeve Arena in Toronto, Ontario, Canada, while the sixth took place at the Frontier Fieldhouse in Chicago Ridge, Illinois. From 2012 to 2016, the event was held in May alongside War of the Worlds, but in 2017, Global Wars was moved to October and made a four-event tour across Buffalo, New York; Pittsburgh, Pennsylvania; Columbus, Ohio; and Villa Park, Illinois. In 2018, the tour was again moved to November with a four-event tour across Buffalo, New York; Toronto, Ontario, Canada; Lowell, Massachusetts; and Lewiston, Maine.

In 2019, ROH announced a three-event tour with the Mexican promotion Consejo Mundial de Lucha Libre (CMLL) as the new partner for the series, renamed Global Wars Espectacular. The events were held in the month of September and the chosen cities were Dearborn, Michigan; Villa Park, Illinois; and Milwaukee, Wisconsin.

Following Global Wars Espectacular: Milwaukee, the event was discontinued for several years. In 2025, ROH revived the "Global Wars" brand for a series of events co-produced with its sister promotion All Elite Wrestling (AEW) outside of the United States and Canada.

== Events ==
#	Event	Date	City	Venue	Main event	Ref(s)
1	Border Wars (2012)	May 12, 2012	Toronto, Ontario, Canada	Ted Reeve Arena	Davey Richards (c) vs. Kevin Steen for the ROH World Championship	
2	Border Wars (2013)	May 4, 2013	Toronto, Ontario, Canada	Ted Reeve Arena	Jay Briscoe (c) vs. Adam Cole for the ROH World Championship	
3	Global Wars (2014)	May 10, 2014	Toronto, Ontario, Canada	Ted Reeve Arena	Adam Cole (c) vs. Kevin Steen for the ROH World Championship	
4	Global Wars '15: Night 1	May 15, 2015	Toronto, Ontario, Canada	Ted Reeve Arena	Bullet Club (A.J. Styles, Doc Gallows, Karl Anderson, Matt Jackson and Nick Jackson) vs. ROH All Stars (Hanson, Jay Briscoe, Mark Briscoe, Ray Rowe and Roderick Strong)	
5	Global Wars '15: Night 2	May 16, 2015	Toronto, Ontario, Canada	Ted Reeve Arena	Bullet Club (A.J. Styles, Matt Jackson and Nick Jackson) vs. Chaos (Beretta, Kazuchika Okada and Rocky Romero)	
6	Global Wars (2016)	May 8, 2016	Chicago Ridge, Illinois, United States	Frontier Fieldhouse	Jay Lethal (c) vs. Colt Cabana for the ROH World Championship	
7	Global Wars 2017: Buffalo	October 12, 2017	Buffalo, New York, United States	Buffalo RiverWorks	The Elite (Kenny Omega, Matt Jackson and Nick Jackson) (c) vs. The Kingdom (Matt Taven, T. K. O'Ryan and Vinny Marseglia) for the ROH World Six-Man Tag Team Championship	
8	Global Wars 2017: Pittsburgh	October 13, 2017	Pittsburgh, Pennsylvania, United States	Stage AE	Luxury Trio (Cody, Kenny Omega and Marty Scurll) (c) vs. Chaos (Toru Yano, Will Ospreay and Yoshi-Hashi) for the ROH World Six-Man Tag Team Championship	
9	Global Wars 2017: Columbus	October 14, 2017	Columbus, Ohio, United States	Express Live!	The Elite (Kenny Omega, Matt Jackson and Nick Jackson) (c) vs. Best Friends (Beretta and Chuckie T.) and Flip Gordon for the ROH World Six-Man Tag Team Championship	
10	Global Wars 2017: Chicago	October 15, 2017	Villa Park, Illinois, United States	Odeum Expo Center	Kenny Omega (c) vs. Yoshi-Hashi for the IWGP United States Heavyweight Championship	
11	Global Wars 2018: Lewiston	November 7, 2018	Lewiston, Maine, United States	Androscoggin Bank Colisee	Jay Lethal, Jonathan Gresham, Chris Sabin and Kushida vs. Los Ingobernables de Japón (Tetsuya Naito, Evil, Sanada and Bushi)	
12	Global Wars 2018: Lowell	November 8, 2018	Lowell, Massachusetts, United States	Lowell Memorial Auditorium	Jay Lethal and Jonathan Gresham vs. Chris Sabin and Kushida vs. The Young Bucks (Matt Jackson and Nick Jackson) vs. The Kingdom (T. K. O'Ryan and Vinny Marseglia)	
13	Global Wars 2018: Buffalo	November 9, 2018	Buffalo, New York, United States	Buffalo RiverWorks	The Briscoes (Jay Briscoe and Mark Briscoe) vs. Best Friends (Beretta and Chuckie T.) vs. The Elite (Cody and Hangman Page)	
14	Global Wars 2018: Toronto	November 11, 2018	Toronto, Ontario, Canada	Mattamy Athletic Centre	Jay Lethal (c) vs. Kenny King for the ROH World Championship	
15	Global Wars Espectacular: Dearborn	September 6, 2019	Dearborn, Michigan, United States	Ford Community & Performing Arts Center	Bandido vs. Jay Briscoe	
16	Global Wars Espectacular: Villa Park	September 7, 2019	Villa Park, Illinois, United States	Odeum Expo Center	Villain Enterprises (Flip Gordon, Brody King and PCO) vs. LifeBlood (Bandido, Tracy Williams and Mark Haskins)	
17	Global Wars Espectacular: Milwaukee	September 8, 2019	Milwaukee, Wisconsin, United States	Potawatomi Hotel & Casino	Rush and Jeff Cobb vs. The Kingdom (Matt Taven and Vinny Marseglia)	
18	Global Wars Australia	February 15, 2025 (aired February 17, 2025)	Brisbane, Queensland, Australia	Brisbane Entertainment Centre	Athena (c) vs. Alex Windsor for the ROH Women's World Championship	
19	Global Wars Mexico	June 18, 2025 (aired June 26, 2025)	Mexico City, Mexico	Arena México	Blue Panther vs. Lee Moriarty (with Carlie Bravo, Shane Taylor and Shawn Dean)	
20	Global Wars United Kingdom	December 13, 2025 and December 17, 2025 (aired December 18, 2025)	Cardiff, Wales, United Kingdom Manchester, England, United Kingdom	Utilita Arena Cardiff Co-op Live	Wheeler Yuta vs. Nigel McGuinness	
21	ROH x Metroplex Global Wars	January 24, 2026	Arlington, Texas, United States	Esports Stadium Arlington	Maya World, Hyan, and Deonna Purrazzo vs. M.I.T. (Athena, Billie Starkz and Diamanté)	
22	Global Wars Canada	March 27, 2026	Windsor, Ontario, Canada	St. Clair College Sportsplex	Kaito Kiyomiya and Bishop Dyer vs. The Good Brothers (Doc Gallows and Karl Anderson) vs. GOA (Bishop Kaun and Toa Liona) vs. Bryce Hanson and Sheldon Jean to determine the inaugural MLP Tag Team Champions	
23	Global Wars: Cincinnati	June 10, 2026, to June 12, 2026	Cincinnati, Ohio	Andrew J. Brady Music Center	Athena (c) vs. Syuri for the ROH Women's World Championship	
23	Global Wars: Cincinnati	June 10, 2026, to June 12, 2026	Cincinnati, Ohio	Andrew J. Brady Music Center	Deonna Purrazzo (c) vs. Olympia for the ROH Women's Pure Championship	
24	Global Wars Mexico 2026	August 4–5, 2026	Mexico City, Mexico	Arena Mexico	Kyle Fletcher vs. Mascara Dorada	
(c) – refers to the champion(s) heading into the match

== See also ==
- Global Wars UK
- Honor Rising: Japan
- ROH/NJPW War of the Worlds
