= Global Wars Mexico (2026) =

2026 professional wrestling event in Mexico City

- Promotion(s): Ring of Honor; Consejo Mundial de Lucha Libre
- Date: August 4–5, 2026 (aired August 13, 2026)
- City: Mexico City, Mexico
- Venue: Arena Mexico

Special event chronology
← Previous; ROH: Beantown Beatdown; CMLL: Todo O Nada	Next → ROH: Death Before Dishonor; CMLL: Azteca Lucha

Global Wars chronology
← Previous; Cincinnati	Next → —

Global Wars Mexico chronology
← Previous; 2025	Next → TBD

Global Wars Mexico was a 2026 professional wrestling event co-promoted by the American promotion Ring of Honor (ROH) and the Mexican promotion Consejo Mundial de Lucha Libre (CMLL). It is the 24th Global Wars event. The event took place on August 4, 2026 and August 5, 2026 at Arena México in Mexico City, Mexico, and was aired on Honor Club on August 13, 2026 as an episode of Ring of Honor Wrestling. It was the third Global Wars event in 2026, after ROH x Metroplex Global Wars in January, Global Wars Canada in March, and Global Wars Cincinnati in June.

== Production ==
=== Background ===
Global Wars is a professional wrestling event held sporadically by the American promotion Ring of Honor (ROH) since 2012. Originally named "Border Wars" and co-produced with the Japanese promotion Pro Wrestling Noah, the event was renamed Global Wars in 2014 after ROH announced a partnership with New Japan Pro-Wrestling.

Under the new name, the event became a supershow co-produced by the two promotions. In 2019, ROH announced a three-event tour with the Mexican promotion Consejo Mundial de Lucha Libre as the new partner for the series, renamed "Global Wars Espectacular". The Global Wars Espectacular tour marked the last Global Wars event held by ROH under the ownership of Sinclair Broadcast Group.

On June 18, 2025, ROH made its debut in Mexico with the Global Wars Mexico event which was taped prior to its sister promotion, All Elite Wrestling, holding a television special titled Grand Slam Mexico.

From August 4, 2026 to August 5, 2026, several matches from CMLL vs. AEW and Grand Slam Mexico were taped to air as a Global Wars special.

=== Storylines ===
Other on-screen personnel
Role:	Name:
Commentators	Ian Riccaboni
Commentators	Caprice Coleman

Global Wars Mexico featured professional wrestling matches that involved different wrestlers from pre-existing scripted feuds and storylines. Storylines were produced on ROH's weekly television program, as well as CMLL's weekly Friday night show Super Viernes and other CMLL events.

== Results ==
No.	Results	Stipulations	Times
1	Kevin Knight (c) defeated Titan by pinfall	Singles match for the AEW TNT Championship	12:16
2	Lio Rush (c) defeated El Clon (with Don Callis) by pinfall	Singles match for the ROH World Television Championship	10:51
3	Thunder Rosa, Maya World, and Hyan defeated Marina Shafir, Skye Blue, and Hikaru Shida by pinfall	Six-woman tag team match	10:21
4	Soberano defeated Komander by pinfall	Lightning match	9:19
5	Kyle Fletcher defeated Mascara Dorada by pinfall	Singles match	11:53
(c) / – the champion(s) heading into the match
