= Global Wars (2016) =

2016 New Japan Pro-Wrestling pay-per-view event

- Promotional poster for the event
- Promotion(s): New Japan Pro-Wrestling; Ring of Honor
- Date: May 8, 2016
- City: Chicago Ridge, Illinois, U.S.
- Venue: Frontier Fieldhouse
- Attendance: 2,000

Events chronology
← Previous (ROH) ROH 14th Anniversary Show / (NJPW) Wrestling Dontaku 2016	Next → (ROH) Best in the World / (NJPW) Lion's Gate Project 2; Best of the Super Juniors XXIII; Dominion 6.19 in Osaka-jo Hall

Global Wars chronology
← Previous '15	Next → 2017

Global Wars (2016) was a professional wrestling pay-per-view (PPV) event co-produced by the American Ring of Honor (ROH) and Japanese New Japan Pro-Wrestling (NJPW) promotions. The event took place on May 8, 2016, at the Frontier Fieldhouse in Chicago Ridge, Illinois. The 2016 Global Wars was the third annual Global Wars event co-produced by ROH and NJPW, and the first to take place outside of Toronto, Canada.

The show featured ten matches in total with two taking place on the pre-show before the PPV. All three of ROH's championships were defended during the event with one title change, where Bobby Fish defeated Tomohiro Ishii for the ROH World Television Championship. The main event match between Jay Lethal and Colt Cabana for the ROH World Championship ended without a winner when the Bullet Club group took over the ring with Adam Cole being introduced as its newest member.

== Production ==
=== Background ===
In February 2014, the American Ring of Honor (ROH) promotion announced a partnership with the Japanese New Japan Pro-Wrestling (NJPW) promotion, which led to the two co-producing the Global Wars and War of the Worlds events in Toronto and New York City, respectively, the following May. A year later, the partnership continued with War of the Worlds '15 and Global Wars '15, which were both two-day events, taking place in Philadelphia and Toronto, respectively.

On August 21, 2015, representatives of NJPW and ROH declared that the relationship between the two promotions was stronger than ever, announcing another North American tour for May 2016, featuring new locations and wrestlers, as well as the first co-produced shows between the two promotions in Tokyo. The two-day event, entitled Honor Rising: Japan 2016, took place on February 19 and 20, 2016.

On January 11, 2016, ROH officially announced that the 2016 Global Wars would take place in Chicago Ridge, Illinois on May 8 and would be broadcast live on pay-per-view (PPV). In addition to airing on traditional cable/satellite PPV, the event also aired on internet PPV through ROHWrestling.com and the FITE TV App.

On April 14, the first four matches for the event were revealed. According to the Wrestling Observer Newsletter, the reveal of the full card had been delayed due to ROH hoping that Katsuyori Shibata and Kenny Omega would get their visas in time to work the event. On April 16, ROH announced the NJPW wrestlers taking part in the event; IWGP Heavyweight Champion Tetsuya Naito, ROH World Television Champion Tomohiro Ishii, IWGP Junior Heavyweight Champion Kushida, Gedo, Hiroshi Tanahashi, Jyushin Thunder Liger and Kazuchika Okada. On April 18, ROH added NJPW's IWGP Tag Team Champions Guerrillas of Destiny (Tama Tonga and Tanga Loa)^{†} to the event, while also officially announcing the main event of the show.

=== Storylines ===
Global Wars featured eight professional wrestling matches that involved different wrestlers from pre-existing scripted feuds and storylines. Wrestlers portrayed villains, heroes, or less distinguishable characters in the scripted events that built tension and culminated in a wrestling match or series of matches.

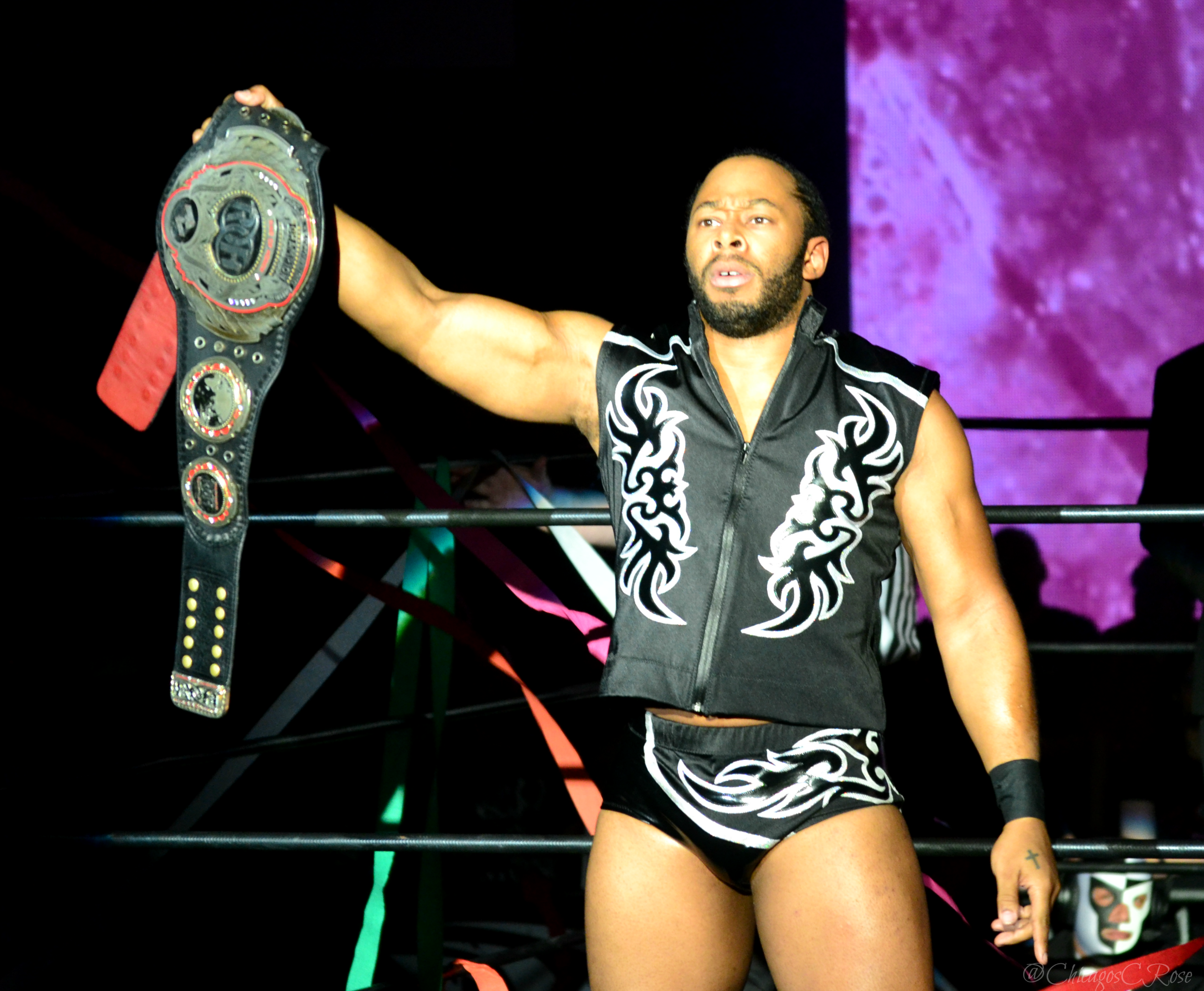
Jay Lethal, who defended the ROH World Championship in the main event of Global Wars

Global Wars was main evented by Jay Lethal defending the ROH World Championship against Colt Cabana. The match was set up during the first night of Supercard of Honor X on April 1, where Cabana returned to ROH, confronting and challenging Lethal after he had successfully defended the ROH World Championship against Lio Rush. This marked Cabana's first appearance for ROH in five years. The following night, Lethal handpicked Cheeseburger as his next challenger, stating that he deserved a title shot more than Cabana. After defeating Cheeseburger, Lethal was again challenged by Cabana, who then proceeded to defeat Lethal in an impromptu non-title match. Cabana had lost a match for the ROH World Championship in 2009, which included a stipulation stating that he could never again challenge for the title in his hometown of Chicago. However, ROH stated that this stipulation had been overturned during negotiations between Cabana and the promotion, setting up the main event of Global Wars between Lethal and Cabana.

On April 20, ROH announced the second title match for the event, which would see Tomohiro Ishii defend the ROH World Television Championship against Bobby Fish. Fish was previously scheduled to challenge his rival Roderick Strong for the title on February 26, 2016, at ROH's 14th Anniversary Show, however, a week before the match, Strong lost the title to Ishii in Tokyo at the ROH and NJPW co-produced Honor Rising: Japan 2016 event. This led to ROH adding Ishii to the match at the 14th Anniversary Show, turning it into a three-way, where Ishii retained his title by pinning Strong. Afterwards, Ishii went on to defend the title in NJPW, while in ROH Fish went on an undefeated streak in singles competition, which included wins over Christopher Daniels and a decisive win over Strong in a two out of three falls match, establishing himself as the number one contender to the ROH World Television Championship in the process.

Also on April 20, ROH announced that at Global Wars War Machine (Hanson and Raymond Rowe) would defend the ROH World Tag Team Championship against The Briscoes (Jay Briscoe and Mark Briscoe). The Briscoes, who became the number one contenders to the title by winning a four-way match at Supercard of Honor X, looked to win the ROH World Tag Team Championship for the ninth time.

On April 21, ROH added a tag team match, which would see Hiroshi Tanahashi and Michael Elgin take on Kazuchika Okada and Moose, to the event. Tanahashi and Elgin had been wrestling regularly as a tag team since NJPW's 2015 World Tag League and recently had become two thirds of the promotion's NEVER Openweight 6-Man Tag Team Champions. Meanwhile, Okada and Moose's partnership was built at ROH's 14th Anniversary Show, where then IWGP Heavyweight Champion Okada defeated Moose in a non-title match.

On April 26, ROH confirmed one of the previously reported matches for Global Wars, where the reigning IWGP Heavyweight Champion Tetsuya Naito will take on Kyle O'Reilly. Naito's title is not on the line in the match. The two had previously faced off during the second night of the 2015 War of the Worlds event, where Naito defeated O'Reilly.

== Event ==
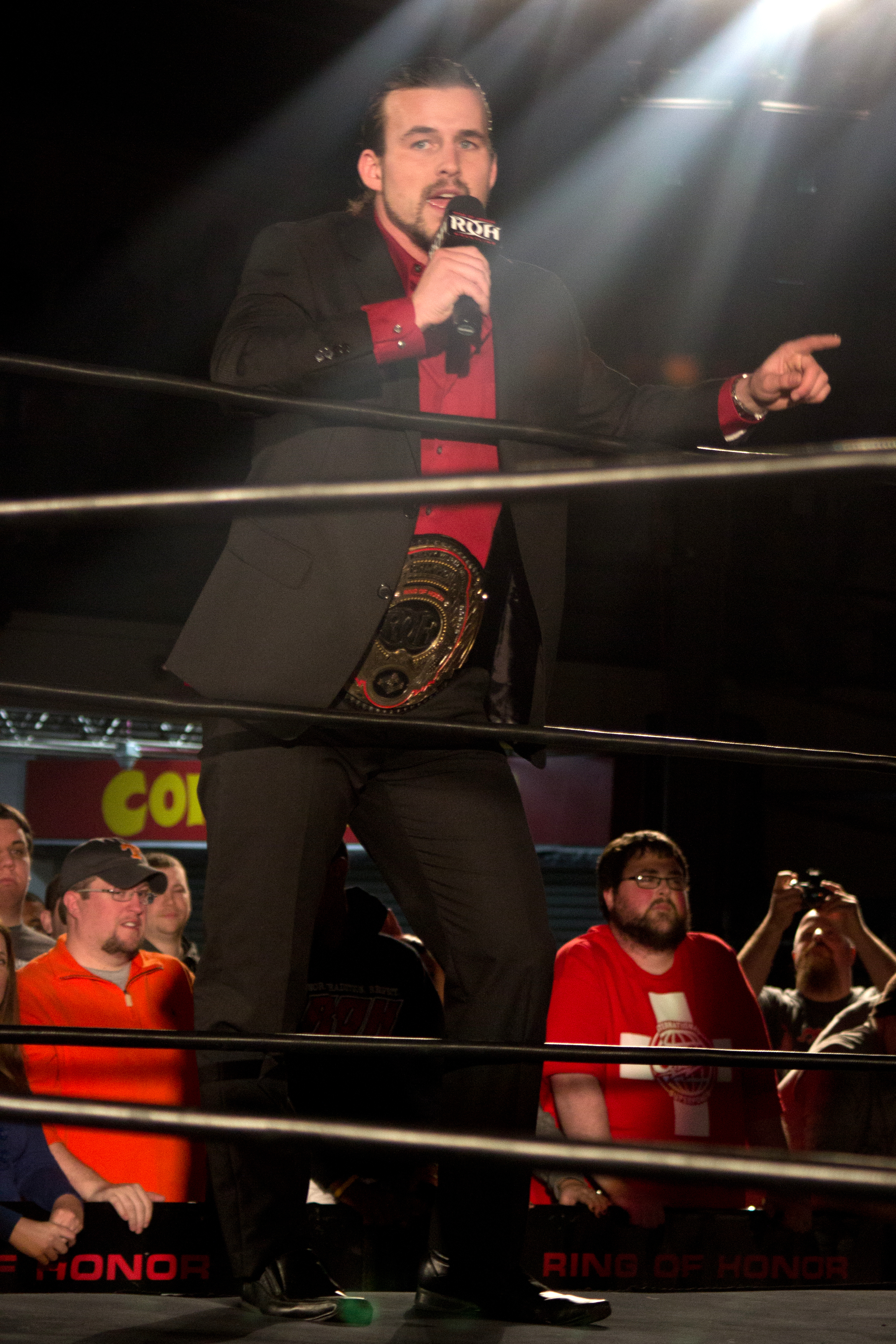
Adam Cole, who joined Bullet Club in the show-closing angle, which polarized reviewers

The main event match between Jay Lethal and Colt Cabana for the ROH World Championship ended in a no contest. Prior to the event, The Young Bucks (Matt Jackson and Nick Jackson) had promised the "world's largest superkick party" and a new member to their Bullet Club stable, but went through their own match without performing any superkicks or revealing the new member. At the conclusion of the main event, the two entered the ring and gave both Cabana and Lethal Bullet Club shirts, before the lights in the arena went out. When they came back on, Adam Cole was in the ring wearing a Bullet Club shirt, while The Young Bucks superkicked both Cabana and Lethal. The show concluded with the Bullet Club quintet of Cole, The Young Bucks and the Guerrillas of Destiny taking over the ring, bringing the total number of superkicks to 51.

== Reception ==
Several reviewers compared the show-closing angle to a New World Order takeover of a World Championship Wrestling (WCW) show. Jason Powell of Pro Wrestling Dot Net called it a "wannabe NWO finish" and "about as campy as it gets". He added "[t]he superkicks and the too sweeting may have put Bullet Club on the map, but it's time for the Young Bucks to start being as innovative with the gimmick as they are in the ring. There's no real sense of danger in watching a bunch of guys do a tongue in cheek emulation of what was cool in 1998[...]". He also criticized ROH for running the novelty of NJPW wrestlers into the ground by featuring them so frequently, calling ROH COO Joe Koff "downright giddy" about working with NJPW, while adding that it was "frightening" how oblivious Koff was to his booker Delirious' shortcomings. Overall, Powell called the show a "miss", stating that it "didn't have any dream matches on paper or in execution, which is something the past ROH/NJPW events were known for".

James Caldwell of Pro Wrestling Torch described the angle with a simple "Eh". He later added that the event made it clear that ROH needed a "booking change", calling the current regime spearheaded by Delirious "burnt-out" and stating that the main event finish was not what ROH was built on. Caldwell went further into the booking by stating that ROH had moved to "lukewarm characters not really doing anything excessively heelish or exceedingly heroic getting reactions mainly for cool spots or big moments with very little follow-through", calling it "just not a sustainable approach". In making the statement, he pointed to the main event segment, noting that the Chicago crowd was conflicted in how to respond, despite Bullet Club costing their "hometown hero" Colt Cabana his first ROH World Championship. Meanwhile, Mike Metzger from the same site called Global Wars "an above-average show that was taken to another level with the angle during the main event" with him dubbing the show-closing angle "masterful work" and a "five-star segment". Nathan Kyght, also of Pro Wrestling Torch, called the show a "letdown", stating "[i]t wasn't a terrible show, but the ending left a bad taste with me and it just didn't have the memorable feel I was hoping for".

Larry Csonka of 411Mania called the angle "bullshit" and gave the show a rating of "extremely horrendous", stating that ROH should be ashamed of themselves for producing it and asking $45 for it. Csonka also stated that the show made ROH performers look like "second class citizens" compared to NJPW performers, who came across as the real stars. Dave Meltzer of the Wrestling Observer Newsletter, who stated that Matt Jackson was one of the key people behind the design and layout of the finish, called it "polarizing", stating that history had shown that similar angles in WCW had been "great short-term but not so great long-term". Meltzer also called the angle a statement from NJPW to WWE, who had recently introduced The Club, which Meltzer called a blatant copy of Bullet Club. He also acknowledged the criticism of NJPW domination in the relationship with ROH, stating "[t]he reality is that New Japan's biggest stars like Kazuchika Okada, Tetsuya Naito and Hiroshi Tanahashi come across far more like major league stars than anyone on the ROH roster".

== Results ==
No.	Results	Stipulations	Times
1^{P}	Kelly Klein (with B. J. Whitmer) defeated Crazy Mary Dobson	Singles match	—
2^{P}	Juice Robinson and Kamaitachi defeated The All Night Express (Kenny King and Rhett Titus) and Beer City Bruiser and Silas Young	Three-way tag team match	07:18
3	Dalton Castle defeated A. C. H., Adam Page and Roderick Strong	Four corner survival match for the number one contendership to the ROH World Television Championship	08:26
4	Cheeseburger and Jyushin Thunder Liger defeated The Addiction (Christopher Daniels and Frankie Kazarian)	Tag team match	07:02
5	War Machine (Hanson and Raymond Rowe) (c) defeated The Briscoes (Jay Briscoe and Mark Briscoe)	Tag team match for the ROH World Tag Team Championship	15:15
6	Tetsuya Naito defeated Kyle O'Reilly	Singles match	12:00
7	Kazuchika Okada and Moose (with Gedo and Stokely Hathaway) defeated Hiroshi Tanahashi and Michael Elgin	Tag team match	13:46
8	Bobby Fish defeated Tomohiro Ishii (c)	Singles match for the ROH World Television Championship	15:30
9	Bullet Club (Matt Jackson, Nick Jackson, Tama Tonga and Tanga Loa/Tanga Roa^{†}) defeated Alex Shelley, Chris Sabin, Kushida and Matt Sydal	Eight-man tag team match	13:08
10	Jay Lethal (c) (with Taeler Hendrix) vs. Colt Cabana ended in a no contest	Singles match for the ROH World Championship	22:30
(c) / – the champion(s) heading into the match; P / – the match was broadcast on the pre-show

== Notes ==
- The name has been written as both "Tanga Loa" and "Tanga Roa".

== See also ==
- 2016 in professional wrestling
