= Global Wars 2018 =

Professional wrestling event

- Promotional poster featuring various ROH and NJPW wrestlers
- Promotion(s): New Japan Pro-Wrestling; Ring of Honor
- Date: November 7, 2018; November 8, 2018; November 9, 2018; November 11, 2018
- City: Lewiston, Maine; Lowell, Massachusetts; Buffalo, New York; Toronto, Ontario, Canada
- Venue: Androscoggin Bank Colisee; Lowell Memorial Auditorium; Buffalo RiverWorks; Mattamy Athletic Centre

Event chronology
← Previous (ROH) Survival of the Fittest / (NJPW) Power Struggle	Next → (ROH) Final Battle / (NJPW) World Tag League; Wrestle Kingdom 13

Global Wars chronology
← Previous; 2017	Next → 2019

Global Wars 2018 was a professional wrestling tour and livestreaming event co-produced by the American Ring of Honor (ROH) and Japanese New Japan Pro-Wrestling (NJPW) promotions. The tour's four events took place on November 7 at the Androscoggin Bank Colisee in Lewiston, Maine, November 8 at Lowell Memorial Auditorium in Lowell, Massachusetts, November 9 at Buffalo RiverWorks in Buffalo, New York and November 11 at Mattamy Athletic Centre in Toronto, Ontario, Canada.

This was the fifth year in which ROH and NJPW co-produced shows under the Global Wars name and was streamed live on Honor Club.

== Production ==
=== Storylines ===
Global Wars 2018 featured professional wrestling matches, which involve different wrestlers from pre-existing scripted feuds, plots, and storylines that play out on ROH's television programs. Wrestlers portrayed villains or heroes as they follow a series of events that build tension and culminate in a wrestling match or series of matches.

Other on-screen personnel
Role:	Name:
Commentators	Joe Dombrowski
Commentators	Colt Cabana
Commentators	Ian Riccaboni
Commentators	Rhett Titus
Commentators	Kelly Klein
Commentators	Dalton Castle
Commentators	Silas Young

== Results ==
=== Global Wars: Lewiston ===
No.	Results	Stipulations	Times
1	Flip Gordon defeated Eli Isom	Singles match	8:00
2	SoCal Uncensored (Frankie Kazarian and Scorpio Sky) defeated The Bouncers (Beer City Bruiser and Brian Milonas)	Tag team match	8:45
3	Jeff Cobb defeated Cheeseburger	Singles match	6:22
4	The Kingdom (Matt Taven, T. K. O'Ryan and Vinny Marseglia) (c) defeated Dalton Castle and The Boys (Boy 1 and Boy 2)	Six-man tag team match for the ROH World Six-Man Tag Team Championship	9:19
5	The Briscoes (Jay Briscoe and Mark Briscoe) defeated The Elite (Cody and Hangman Page) (with Brandi Rhodes)	Tag team match	—
6	Juice Robinson defeated Christopher Daniels	Singles match	12:08
7	Bully Ray and Silas Young defeated The Young Bucks (Matt Jackson and Nick Jackson)	Tag team match	16:30
8	Los Ingobernables de Japón (Tetsuya Naito, Evil, Sanada and Bushi) defeated Jay Lethal, Jonathan Gresham, Chris Sabin and Kushida	Eight-man tag team match	16:46
(c) / – the champion(s) heading into the match

=== Global Wars: Lowell ===
No.	Results	Stipulations	Times
1^{D}	Shinobi Shadow Squad (Cheeseburger, Eli Isom and Ryan Nova) defeated Anthony Greene, Brad Hollister and Brad Johnson	Six-man tag team match	—
2	Matt Taven defeated Bushi	Singles match	6:55
3	Dalton Castle and Juice Robinson defeated The Bouncers (Beer City Bruiser and Brian Milonas)	Tag team match	11:40
4	Flip Gordon defeated Frankie Kazarian	Singles match	10:31
5	Sumie Sakai defeated Jenny Rose	Singles match	8:50
6	Scorpio Sky defeated Jay Briscoe	Singles match	9:59
7	Los Ingobernables de Japón (Evil and Sanada) defeated Bully Ray and Silas Young	Tag team match	12:55
8	Jeff Cobb defeated Christopher Daniels	Singles match	8:28
9	Cody (with Brandi Rhodes) defeated Mark Briscoe	Singles match	23:32
10	Tetsuya Naito defeated Hangman Page	Singles match	12:45
11	Jay Lethal and Jonathan Gresham defeated Chris Sabin and Kushida, The Young Bucks (Matt Jackson and Nick Jackson) and The Kingdom (T. K. O'Ryan and Vinny Marseglia)	Four Corner Survival tag team match	12:39
D / – this was a dark match

=== Global Wars: Buffalo ===
No.	Results	Stipulations	Times
1	Dalton Castle defeated T. K. O'Ryan	Singles match	7:58
2	Kenny King defeated Cheeseburger	Singles match	6:57
3	Kelly Klein defeated Madison Rayne	Singles match	7:53
4	Kushida defeated Jonathan Gresham, Flip Gordon and Bushi	Four Corner Survival match	9:34
5	Jeff Cobb defeated Evil	Singles match	11:57
6	Juice Robinson defeated Silas Young by disqualification	Singles match	13:12
7	The Young Bucks (Matt Jackson and Nick Jackson) defeated Los Ingobernables de Japón (Tetsuya Naito and Sanada)	Tag team match	15:36
8	Jay Lethal vs. Chris Sabin ended in a time limit draw	Singles match	15:00
9	Best Friends (Beretta and Chuckie T.) defeated The Briscoes (Jay Briscoe and Mark Briscoe) and The Elite (Cody and Hangman Page) (with Brandi Rhodes)	Three-way tag team match	18:49

=== Global Wars: Toronto ===
No.	Results	Stipulations	Times
1	Karen Q defeated Kaitlin Diamond	Singles match	6:31
2	Hangman Page defeated Chuckie T	Singles match	10:42
3	Los Ingobernables de Japón (Tetsuya Naito and Bushi) defeated The Kingdom (T. K. O'Ryan and Vinny Marseglia)	Tag team match	11:32
4	Matt Taven defeated Christopher Daniels	Singles match	9:36
5	The Briscoes (Jay Briscoe and Mark Briscoe) defeated Los Ingobernables de Japón (Evil and Sanada)	Tag team match	13:54
6	Flip Gordon defeated Jonathan Gresham	Singles match	8:56
7	SoCal Uncensored (Frankie Kazarian and Scorpio Sky) (c) defeated Super Smash Bros (Evil Uno and Stu Grayson)	Tag team match for the ROH World Tag Team Championship	13:28
8	Juice Robinson defeated Baretta	Singles match	18:48
9	The Young Bucks (Matt Jackson and Nick Jackson) defeated Chris Sabin and Kushida	Tag team match	15:20
10	Jay Lethal (c) defeated Kenny King	Singles match for the ROH World Championship	22:11
(c) / – the champion(s) heading into the match

== See also ==
- 2018 in professional wrestling
