= Global Wars Espectacular =

2019 professional wrestling show

Global Wars Especatular
- Promotions: Consejo Mundial de Lucha Libre; Ring of Honor
- Date: September 6, 2019; September 7, 2019; September 8, 2019
- City: Dearborn, Michigan; Villa Park, Illinois; Milwaukee, Wisconsin
- Venue: Ford Community & Performing Arts Center; Odeum Expo Center; Potawatomi Hotel & Casino

Event chronology
← Previous
- (ROH) Honor For All
- (CMLL) International Gran Prix
Next →
- (ROH) Death Before Dishonor XVII
- (CMLL) 86th Anniversary

Global Wars chronology
← Previous; 2018	Next → Australia

Global Wars Espectacular was a 2019 multi-promotional professional wrestling supershow tour and livestreaming event co-produced by the American promotion Ring of Honor (ROH) and Mexico's Consejo Mundial de Lucha Libre (CMLL). It was the 17th Global Wars event and the tour spanned three dates, from September 6 through September 8, 2019. It made stops at the Ford Community & Performing Arts Center in Dearborn, Michigan on September 6, the Odeum Expo Center in Villa Park, Illinois on September 7, and the Potawatomi Hotel & Casino in Milwaukee, Wisconsin on September 8. The events were broadcast live on Honor Club and FITE TV.

== Background ==
=== Production ===
The U.S. based Ring of Honor (ROH) and the Mexico based Consejo Mundial de Lucha Libre (CMLL) Professional wrestling promotions started a working partnership in the mid-2010s, with ROH wrestlers travelling to Mexico to compete on CMLL shows and CMLL wrestlers working select shows in the U.S. for Ring of Honor. The two promotions have collaborated on supershow events over the year, such as the 2016 through 2019 International Gran Prix in Mexico, the Summer Supercard show in 2019, and the CMLL 85th Anniversary Show where ROH wrestler Matt Taven worked the main event.

In late July ROH announced that they had partnered with CMLL for a three day "Global Wars Espectacular" tour, as part of their annual Global Wars series of events. The three-stop tour would start on September 6, 2019 at the Ford Community Center in Dearborn, Michigan. The second stop, on September 7, will be at the Odeum Expo in Chicago and concluded at the Potawatomi Casino in Milwaukee on September 8. Several of the matches would feature ROH and CMLL wrestlers facing off, in additional to non-interpromotional matches.

=== Storylines ===
the Global Wars Espectecular tour will feature professional wrestling matches, involving different wrestlers from pre-existing scripted feuds, plots, and storylines that played out on ROH's television programs. Wrestlers portrayed villains (referred to as rudos in Mexico) or heroes (tecnicos) as they follow a series of events that build tension and culminate in a wrestling match or series of matches.

== Results ==
=== Global Wars Espectacular: Dearborn ===
No.	Results	Stipulations
1	Dak Draper defeated The Haitian Sensation	Top Prospect Tournament Semifinal Singles match
2	Silas Young and Josh Woods defeated The Bouncers (Brian Milonas and Beer City Bruiser)	Tag team match
3	Rush defeated Tritón	Singles match
4	Mark Haskins defeated Rhett Titus	Singles match
5	Kenny King defeated Jeff Cobb and Tracy Williams	Triple Threat match
6	Dalton Castle and Joe Hendry defeated Jay Lethal and Jonathan Gresham	Tag team match
7	Villain Enterprises (Marty Scurll, Flip Gordon, PCO, and Brody King) defeated Team CMLL (Rey Bucanero, Okumura, Hechicero, and Bárbaro Cavernario)	Six-man tag team match
8	Volador Jr. and Stuka Jr. defeated The Kingdom (Matt Taven and Vinny Marseglia)	Tag team match
9	Bandido defeated Jay Briscoe	Singles match

=== Global Wars Espectacular: Villa Park ===
No.	Results	Stipulations
1^{D}	Royce Isaacs and Thomas Latimer defeated Villain Enterprises (Brody King and PCO) (c)	Tag team match for the NWA World Tag Team Championship
2	Austin Gunn defeated Dante Caballero	Singles match
3	Silas Young and Josh Woods defeated P. J. Black and Okumura	Tag team match
4	Sumie Sakai and Jenny Rose defeated The Allure (Mandy Leon and Angelina Love) by disqualification	Tag team match
5	Joe Hendry and Shane Taylor ended in a draw	Singles match
6	The Briscoe Brothers (Jay Briscoe and Mark Briscoe) defeated Rey Bucanero and Hechicero, and The Bouncers (Beer City Bruiser and Brian Milonas)	Triple Treat Tag team match
7	Rush defeated Bárbaro Cavernario	Singles match
8	Jeff Cobb, Jonathan Gresham, and Jay Lethal defeated Tritón, Carístico, and Stuka Jr.	Six-man tag team match
9	Colt Cabana defeated Dalton Castle, Marty Scurll, and Kenny King	Four-way match to determine final qualifier for Four corners showcase
10	Matt Taven (c) defeated Volador Jr.	Singles match for the ROH World Championship
11	Villain Enterprises (Flip Gordon, Brody King, and PCO) defeated Lifeblood (Bandido, Tracy Williams, and Mark Haskins)	Six-man tag team match
(c) / – the champion(s) heading into the match; D / – this was a dark match

=== Global Wars Espectacular: Milwaukee ===
No.	Results	Stipulations
1	Villain Enterprises (PCO and Brody King) defeated The Bouncers (Beer City Bruiser and Brawler Milonas)	Tag team match
2	Shane Taylor (c) defeated Dysfunction	Singles match for the ROH World Television Championship
3	Stacy Shadows and Kelly Klein defeated The Allure (Mandy Leon and Angelina Love)	Tag team match
4	Marty Scurll defeated Joe Hendry	Singles match
5	Silas Young and Josh Woods defeated Jay Lethal and Jonathan Gresham	Tag team match
6	P. J. Black defeated Tritón and Flip Gordon	Three-way match
7	Carístico, Stuka Jr., and Volador Jr. defeated Okumura, Hechicero, and Rey Bucanero	Six-man tag team match
8	Lifeblood (Bandido, Tracy Williams, and Mark Haskins) defeated The Briscoe Brothers (Mark Briscoe and Jay Briscoe) and Bárbaro Cavernario	Six-man tag team match
9	Rush and Jeff Cobb defeated The Kingdom (Matt Taven and Vinny Marseglia)	Tag team match
(c) / – the champion(s) heading into the match
