= ROH x CMLL x Stardom Global Wars =

2026 professional wrestling event

- Promotional poster of the event
- Promotion(s): Ring of Honor (ROH); Consejo Mundial de Lucha Libre (CMLL); World Wonder Ring Stardom (Stardom)
- Date: June 10–11, 2026 (aired June 18, 2026 and June 25, 2026)
- City: Cincinnati, Ohio
- Venue: Andrew J. Brady Music Center

Pay-per-view chronology
← Previous; ROH: Supercard of Honor; CMLL: CMLL vs. MLW; Stardom: Queens Dynasty	Next → ROH: Death Before Dishonor; CMLL: Fantastica Mania Mexico; Stardom: The Conversion

ROH Global Wars chronology
← Previous; Canada	Next → Mexico

ROH x CMLL x Stardom Global Wars, promoted as Global Wars Cincinnati was a professional wrestling event produced and co-promoted by the American promotion Ring of Honor (ROH), the Mexican promotion Consejo Mundial de Lucha Libre (CMLL), and the Japanese women's wrestling promotion World Wonder Ring Stardom (Stardom). It was the 23rd Global Wars event and took place on June 10 and June 11, 2026 at the Andrew J. Brady Music Center in Cincinnati, Ohio and aired on June 18, 2026 and part two aired on June 25, 2026 as a special episode of Ring of Honor Wrestling. There was also a match taped during the June 12, 2026 edition of CMLL's Viernes Espectacular at Arena Mexico in Mexico City which aired as part of the first part of the event's broadcast.

== Production ==
=== Background ===
Global Wars is a professional wrestling event held sporadically by the American promotion Ring of Honor (ROH) since 2012. Originally named "Border Wars" and co-produced with the Japanese promotion Pro Wrestling Noah, the event was renamed Global Wars in 2014 after ROH announced a partnership with New Japan Pro-Wrestling.

Under the new name, the event became a supershow and later a multi-day tour co-produced by the two promotions. In 2019, ROH announced a three-event tour with the Mexican promotion Consejo Mundial de Lucha Libre as the new partner for the tour, renamed "Global Wars Espectacular". The Global Wars Espectacular tour marked the last Global Wars event held by ROH under the ownership of Sinclair Broadcast Group.

On May 15, 2026, ROH, CMLL, and Stardom announced that they would present a joint Global Wars show at in Cincinnati, Ohio.

=== Storylines ===
Other on-screen personnel
Role:	Name:
Commentators	Ian Riccaboni
Commentators	Caprice Coleman

ROH x CMLL x Stardom Global Wars featured multiple professional wrestling matches that involved different wrestlers from pre-existing scripted feuds and storylines. Storylines were produced on ROH's streaming program Ring of Honor Wrestling, CMLL's weekly programming and various events, and Stardom events.-

Back in February 27, 2026 at New Japan Pro-Wrestling’s event The New Beginning USA Syuri defeated Athena to retain the IWGP Women's Championship. On the June 4, 2026 episode of ROH Athena called out Syrui to face her in a rematch at Global Wars Cincinnati, but this time she is putting her ROH Women's World Championship on the line against her instead of the match being for the IWGP Women's Championship. Also after the match at The New Beginning USA Syrui grabbed Athena’s ROH Women's title and then gave it back to her, hinting that she might want to go for the title in the future.

Throughout late 2024 to 2026 Lio Rush and Action Andretti were a tag team by the name of CRU. Over time, the tag team officially broke up, specifically at Supercard of Honor after Andretti cost Lio Rush the ROH World Television Championship against AR Fox after interfering and shoving Lio off the turnbuckles when the referee wasn't watching. Out of all the chaos to settle the full score on June 10, 2026 it was officially announced by Tony Khan that at Global Wars Cincinnati it will be Lio Rush vs. Action Andretti vs. AR Fox in a Triple threat match for the ROH World Television Championship.

== Results ==
Part 1 (Taped June 10–12, 2026; Aired June 18, 2026)
No.	Results	Stipulations	Times
1	"Blackheart" Lio Rush defeated AR Fox (c) and Action Andretti by pinfall	Three-way match for the ROH World Television Championship	14:53
2	Red Velvet and Thunder Rosa defeated Lacey Lane and Viva Van by pinfall	Tag team match	7:41
3	Maika defeated Diamanté by pinfall	Singles match	6:43
4	La Facción Ingobernable (Sammy Guevara and The Beast Mortos) (c) defeated Los Villanos (El Hijo del Villano III and Villano III Jr.) by pinfall	Tag team match for the ROH World Tag Team Championship; This was taped during the June 12, 2026 edition of CMLL's Viernes Espectacular at Arena Mexico in Mexico City	14:53
5	Konosuke Takeshita (c) defeated Lee Johnson by pinfall	Singles match for the AEW International Championship	9:30
6	Takumi Iroha (with Sareee) defeated Hyan by pinfall	Singles match	9:49
7	Místico, "Speedball" Mike Bailey, and The Outrunners (Turbo Floyd and Truth Magnum) defeated RPG Vice (Rocky Romero and Trent Beretta) and The Lethal Twist (Jay Lethal and Blake Christian) by pinfall	Eight-man tag team match	11:46
8	Athena (c) defeated Syuri by pinfall	Singles match for the ROH Women's World Championship	16:18
(c) / – the champion(s) heading into the match

Part 2 (Taped June 10–11, 2026; Aired June 25, 2026)
No.	Results	Stipulations	Times
1	Mark Davis (c) defeated Ace Austin by pinfall	Singles match for the AEW National Championship	9:18
2	Harley Cameron and Mina Shirakawa defeated Lacey Lane and Viva Van by pinfall	Tag team match	8:26
3	Syuri defeated Billie Starkz by submission	Singles match	10:36
4	The Opps (Hook, Anthony Bowens, and Katsuyori Shibata) defeated Beef and The Premier Athletes (Tony Nese and Ariya Daivari) (with Stori Denali and "Smart" Mark Sterling) by pinfall	Six-man tag team match	9:59
5	Mikey Nicholls defeated Aaron Solo by pinfall	Singles match	4:25
6	Queen Aminata defeated Hanako by pinfall	Singles match	6:55
7	Deonna Purrazzo (c) defeated Olympia by submission	Pure Wrestling Rules match for the ROH Women's Pure Championship	8:52
(c) / – the champion(s) heading into the match
