= Border Wars (2013) =

Professional wrestling event

- Promotional poster featuring Taiji Ishimori, Naomichi Marufuji, Kevin Steen, and Adam Cole
- Promotion(s): Ring of Honor; Pro Wrestling Noah
- Date: May 4, 2013
- City: Toronto, Ontario, Canada
- Venue: Ted Reeve Arena
- Attendance: 1,100

Pay-per-view chronology
← Previous; Supercard of Honor VII	Next → Best in the World 2013

Border/Global Wars chronology
← Previous; 2012	Next → 2014

Border Wars (2013) was a professional wrestling internet pay-per-view event co-produced by Ring of Honor (ROH) and Japanese wrestling promotion Pro Wrestling Noah. It took place on May 4, 2013, at the Ted Reeve Arena in Toronto, Ontario, Canada.

== Production ==
Other on-screen personnel
Role	Name
Commentators	Kevin Kelly
Commentators	Nigel McGuiness

=== Storylines ===
Border Wars 2013 featured professional wrestling matches, which involved different wrestlers from pre-existing scripted feuds, plots, and storylines that played out on ROH's television programs. Wrestlers portrayed villains or heroes as they followed a series of events that built tension and culminated in a wrestling match or series of matches.

== Results ==
No.	Results	Stipulations	Times
1^{D}	Ethan Page and Josh Alexander defeated The Flatliners (Asylum and Matt Burns)	Tag team match	—
2	Caprice Coleman and Cedric Alexander defeated A. C. H. and TaDarius Thomas	Tag team match	10:54
3	Roderick Strong defeated Mike Bennett (with Maria Kanellis)	Singles match	12:45
4	B. J. Whitmer defeated Rhett Titus	"I Quit" match	11:32
5	S.C.U.M. (Cliff Compton and Jimmy Jacobs) defeated Kevin Steen and Michael Elgin	Tag team match	20:14
6	Eddie Edwards defeated Taiji Ishimori	Interpromotional singles match	15:40
7	Matt Taven (c) (with Truth Martini and Scarlett Bordeaux) defeated Mark Briscoe	Singles match for the ROH World Television Championship	13:44
8	Davey Richards defeated Paul London	Singles match	18:07
9	Jay Briscoe (c) defeated Adam Cole	Singles match for the ROH World Championship	20:08
(c) / – the champion(s) heading into the match; D / – this was a dark match

== See also ==
- Professional wrestling in Canada
