= Wrestling Dontaku 2016 =

2016 New Japan Pro-Wrestling event

- Promotional poster for the event, featuring caricatures of several NJPW wrestlers
- Promotion: New Japan Pro-Wrestling
- Date: May 3, 2016
- City: Fukuoka, Japan
- Venue: Fukuoka Kokusai Center
- Attendance: 5,299

Event chronology
← Previous; Road to Wrestling Dontaku	Next → Global Wars

Wrestling Dontaku chronology
← Previous; 2015	Next → 2017

New Japan Pro-Wrestling events chronology
← Previous; Invasion Attack 2016	Next → Global Wars

Wrestling Dontaku 2016 was a professional wrestling event promoted by New Japan Pro-Wrestling (NJPW). The event took place on May 3, 2016, in Fukuoka, Fukuoka at Fukuoka Kokusai Center and featured ten matches, six of which were contested for championships. The show was headlined by Tetsuya Naito making his first defense of the IWGP Heavyweight Championship against Tomohiro Ishii. It was the thirteenth event under the Wrestling Dontaku name.

== Storylines ==
Wrestling Dontaku 2016 featured ten professional wrestling matches that involved different wrestlers from pre-existing scripted feuds and storylines. Wrestlers portrayed villains, heroes, or less distinguishable characters in the scripted events that built tension and culminated in a wrestling match or series of matches.

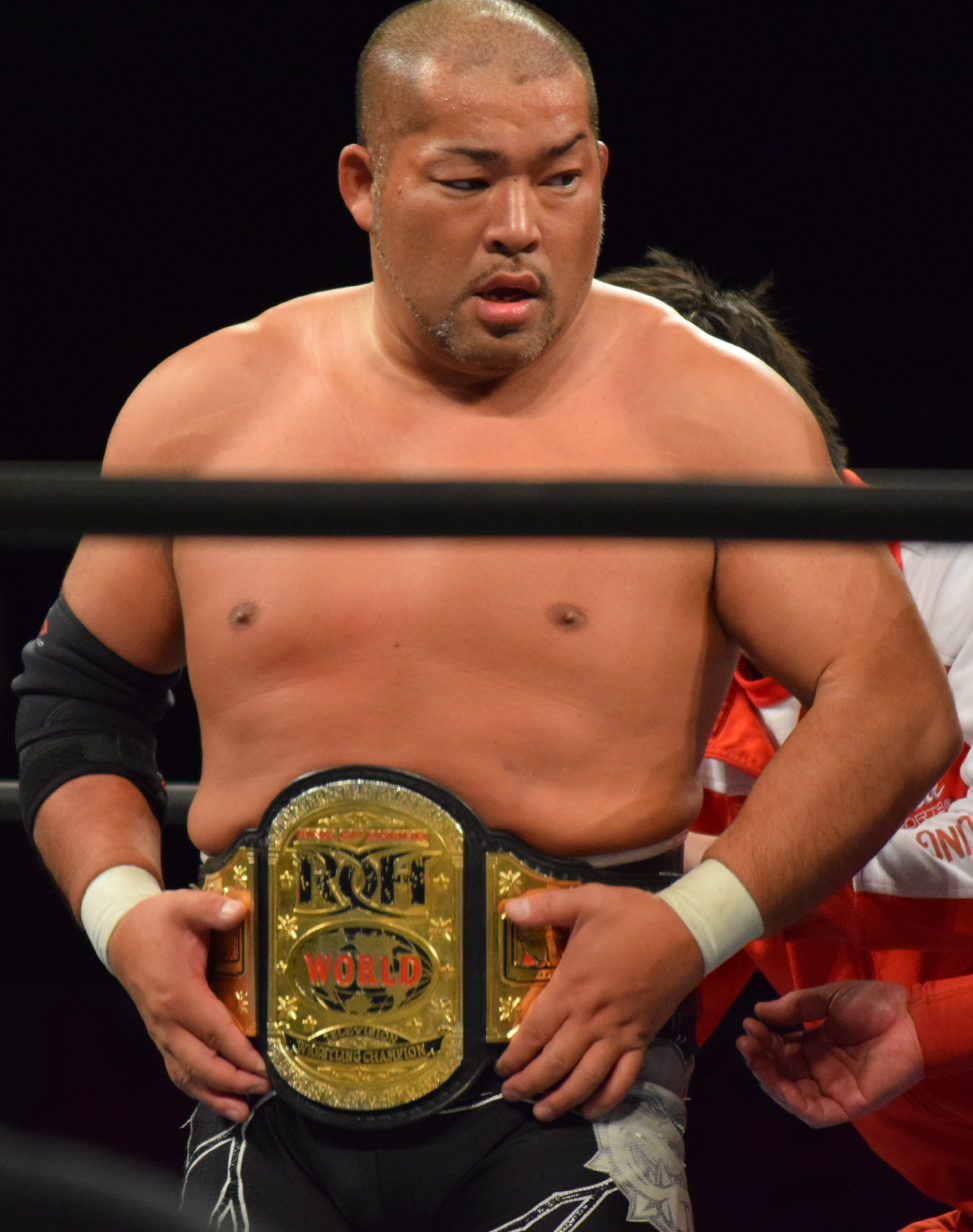
ROH World Television Champion Tomohiro Ishii, who got his first-ever shot at the IWGP Heavyweight Championship in the main event of Wrestling Dontaku 2016

NJPW announced the first matches for Wrestling Dontaku 2016 on April 11, 2016, the day after Invasion Attack 2016. The event would be headlined by new IWGP Heavyweight Champion Tetsuya Naito making his first title defense against Tomohiro Ishii in what would mark Ishii's first-ever title shot. The match came as a result of events taking place at Invasion Attack 2016, where Ishii confronted Naito after Naito had defeated his Chaos stablemate Kazuchika Okada for the IWGP Heavyweight Championship. Naito and Ishii had previously faced off in early 2014, when Ishii defeated Naito for the NEVER Openweight Championship. More recently the two had met in the second round of the 2016 New Japan Cup, where Naito was victorious en route to winning the entire tournament. Ishii would enter the match as the reigning ROH World Television Champion, however, his title would not be on the line. Were he to win the title, Ishii, standing at 1.70 m (5 ft 7 in), would have become the shortest IWGP Heavyweight Champion in history.

The event was also set to show two more matches between members of Chaos and Naito's Los Ingobernables de Japón (L.I.J.) stables. At Invasion Attack 2016, former All Japan Pro Wrestling (AJPW), Wrestle-1 and Total Nonstop Action Wrestling (TNA) worker Seiya Sanada made his surprise debut for NJPW, attacking Kazuchika Okada during the main event and costing him the IWGP Heavyweight Championship in his match against Naito, setting up a match between Okada and the man now simply known as "Sanada" for Wrestling Dontaku 2016. Sanada, who was once seen as a future "ace" prospect, but whose status had fallen since becoming a freelancer, stated he was going to use Okada as a stepping stone in their match at Wrestling Dontaku 2016. Also on the card, Naito and Sanada's L.I.J. stablemate Evil was set to take on Chaos' Hirooki Goto, coming off a post-match brawl between the two at Invasion Attack 2016. This would mark the second match between the two, following a match in November 2015, which Goto won by disqualification.

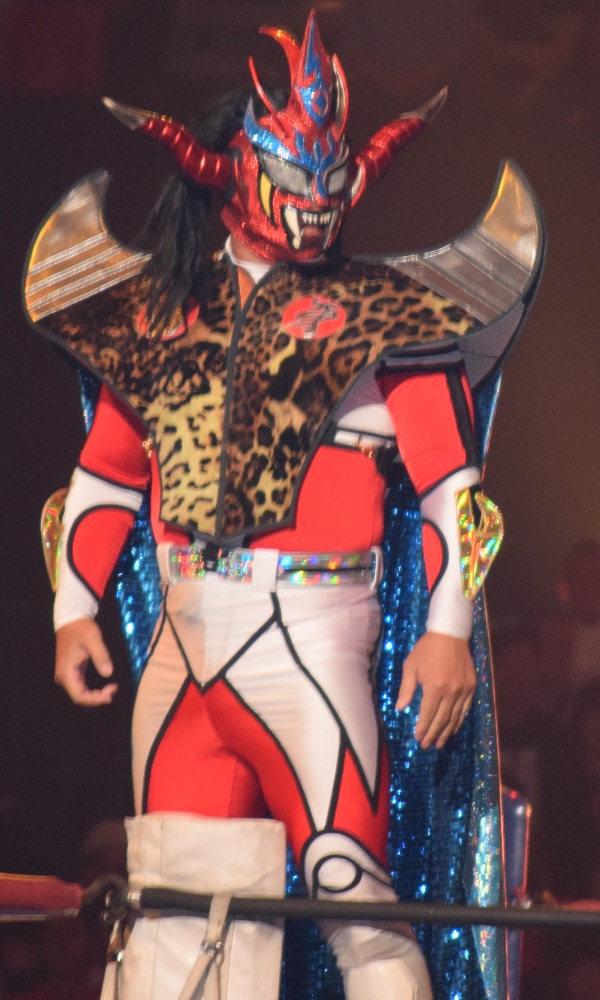
Jyushin Thunder Liger, who looked to win the IWGP Junior Heavyweight Championship for the 12th time at Wrestling Dontaku 2016

NJPW also announced two other title matches for Wrestling Dontaku 2016 on April 11. In the first, Kushida would defend the IWGP Junior Heavyweight Championship against local Fukuoka resident Jyushin Thunder Liger in what marked the veteran wrestler's first shot at the title since April 2010. Liger is a former 11-time IWGP Junior Heavyweight Champion, but had not held the title since July 2000. Kushida and Liger had agreed to the title match the previous day at Invasion Attack 2016. In the other title match, new IWGP Tag Team Champions, Guerrillas of Destiny (Tama Tonga and Tanga Loa), would defend their newly won title against previous champions, G.B.H. (Togi Makabe and Tomoaki Honma), in a rematch from Invasion Attack 2016.

The rest of the matches were announced on April 13. Added were two tag team matches, one ten-man tag team match (later changed to an eight-man tag team match) and a non-title rematch from Invasion Attack 2016, where the new NEVER Openweight 6-Man Tag Team Champions Hiroshi Tanahashi, Michael Elgin and Yoshitatsu were set to face previous champions, Bullet Club's The Elite (Kenny Omega, Matt Jackson and Nick Jackson). On April 25, it was announced that the match would now be contested for the NEVER Openweight 6-Man Tag Team Championship. On April 23, Tanahashi, Elgin and Yoshitatsu had successfully defended the title against another Bullet Club trio of Omega, Bad Luck Fale and Yujiro Takahashi, however, the next day, Omega pinned Yoshitatsu to win an elimination tag team match for Bullet Club, leading to the change in the card. The six-man title program also came to involve Omega's IWGP Intercontinental Championship with Omega successfully defending the title against Elgin on April 27. Afterwards, Omega turned down a challenge from Tanahashi by low blowing him.

On April 19, the day after the Wrestling Hinokuni 2016 show had been canceled due to the 2016 Kumamoto earthquakes, two matches previously announced for the show were moved to Wrestling Dontaku 2016. The first was a rematch from Invasion Attack 2016, where the new IWGP Junior Heavyweight Tag Team Champions, Roppongi Vice (Beretta and Rocky Romero), defend the title against previous champions, Matt Sydal and Ricochet. The second continued a storyline, where Katsuyori Shibata defended the NEVER Openweight Championship against NJPW veterans, known as the "third generation". Having already defended the title against Satoshi Kojima, at Invasion Attack 2016, Shibata successfully defended the title against Hiroyoshi Tenzan and afterwards kicked Yuji Nagata to set him up as his next challenger. The two had previously faced off in August 2014 during the 2014 G1 Climax tournament, where Nagata defeated Shibata. Shibata vowed that the match at Wrestling Dontaku 2016 would be the end of his rivalry with the third generation.

== Event ==
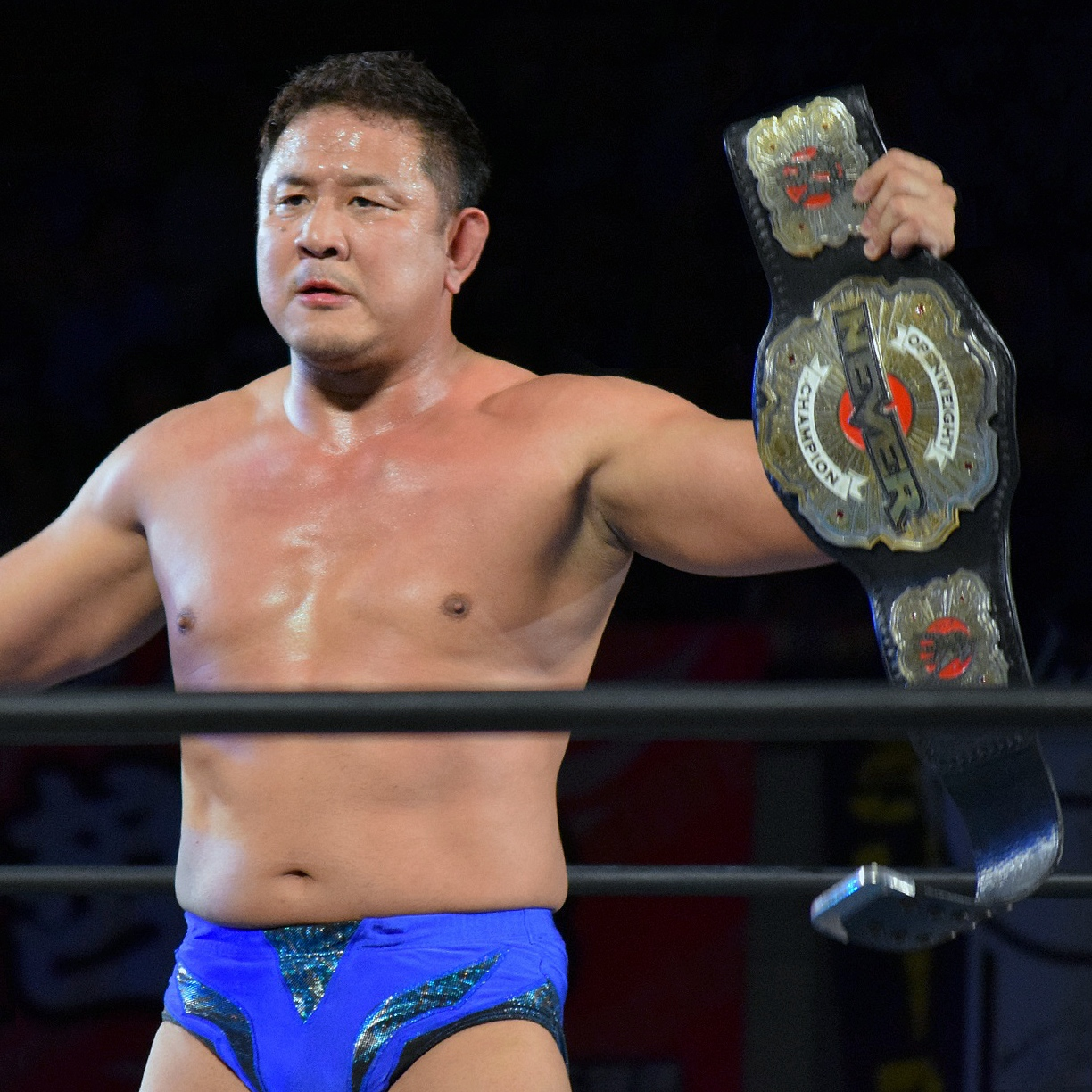
Yuji Nagata, who captured the NEVER Openweight Championship at Wrestling Dontaku 2016

In the first title match of the show, Matt Sydal and Ricochet defeated Roppongi Vice to regain the IWGP Junior Heavyweight Tag Team Championship they had lost less than a month earlier. The next match saw Hiroshi Tanahashi, Michael Elgin and Yoshitatsu defend the NEVER Openweight 6-Man Tag Team Championship against The Elite. Throughout the match, The Elite used hairspray, a ladder and a table to try to cheat their way to victory. In the finish of the match, Omega, with help from The Young Bucks, powerbombed Elgin through a table, then the three gave Yoshitatsu a triple superkick, before Omega pinned him with the Katayoku no Tenshi to win the match and regain the title. After the match, Tanahashi again challenged Omega to a match for the IWGP Intercontinental Championship. Initially, Omega again turned down the challenge, but then stated that he would agree to it, if Tanahashi agreed that they would have a ladder match for the title. Tanahashi agreed and the two shook hands. In the next match, The Elite's Bullet Club stablemates Guerrillas of Destiny made their first successful defense of the IWGP Tag Team Championship against previous champions, G.B.H. Before the next match, NJPW announced the participants in the 2016 Best of the Super Juniors tournament. The next match saw the culmination of Katsuyori Shibata's rivalry with NJPW's third generation. In the match, the 48-year old Yuji Nagata defeated Shibata to win the NEVER Openweight Championship for the first time. This marked the first time Nagata had held a singles title in NJPW since October 2007. The fifth title match of the show saw Kushida submit Jyushin Thunder Liger with the Hoverboard Lock to make his fourth successful defense of the IWGP Junior Heavyweight Championship and head into the Best of the Super Juniors as the reigning champion.

The show closed with a three match series between members of the Chaos and Los Ingobernables de Japón (L.I.J.) stables. In the first match, Evil gave L.I.J. the lead by defeating Hirooki Goto with the Evil, only for Kazuchika Okada to tie the series by defeating Sanada with the Rainmaker. In the main event, Tetsuya Naito defended the IWGP Heavyweight Championship against Tomohiro Ishii. The match featured outside interference from both stables, with Okada and Gedo entering the ring to stop Bushi and Evil's attack on Ishii. In the end, Naito defeated Ishii with the Destino to retain the IWGP Heavyweight Championship. After the match, Okada had a staredown with Naito, indicating he wanted a rematch for the IWGP Heavyweight Championship. Meanwhile, Naito noted the positive response he had gotten from the crowd in Fukuoka, mocked NJPW owner Takaaki Kidani, whom he had earlier accused of being in cahoots with Okada, and invited him to his next title defense to witness the response himself.

== Results ==
No.	Results	Stipulations	Times
1	Bullet Club (Bad Luck Fale and Yujiro Takahashi) defeated Captain New Japan and Juice Robinson	Tag team match	02:26
2	Chaos (Gedo, Kazushi Sakuraba, Will Ospreay and Yoshi-Hashi) defeated David Finlay, Jay White, Ryusuke Taguchi and Tiger Mask	Eight-man tag team match	07:23
3	Matt Sydal and Ricochet defeated Roppongi Vice (Beretta and Rocky Romero) (c)	Tag team match for the IWGP Junior Heavyweight Tag Team Championship	16:26
4	The Elite (Kenny Omega, Matt Jackson and Nick Jackson) defeated Hiroshi Tanahashi, Michael Elgin and Yoshitatsu (c)	Six-man tag team match for the NEVER Openweight 6-Man Tag Team Championship	14:03
5	Guerrillas of Destiny (Tama Tonga and Tanga Loa) (c) defeated G.B.H. (Togi Makabe and Tomoaki Honma)	Tag team match for the IWGP Tag Team Championship	12:12
6	Yuji Nagata defeated Katsuyori Shibata (c)	Singles match for the NEVER Openweight Championship	11:53
7	Kushida (c) defeated Jyushin Thunder Liger	Singles match for the IWGP Junior Heavyweight Championship	14:37
8	Evil defeated Hirooki Goto	Singles match	09:53
9	Kazuchika Okada (with Gedo) defeated Sanada	Singles match	15:11
10	Tetsuya Naito (c) (with Bushi and Evil) defeated Tomohiro Ishii (with Gedo and Kazuchika Okada)	Singles match for the IWGP Heavyweight Championship	30:33
(c) / – the champion(s) heading into the match
