= Hyan =

Hyan is a given name or nickname. Notable people with the name include:

- Hyan (footballer) (born 2004), a Brazilian football midfielder
- Hyan (wrestler) (born 1992), an American professional wrestler
