= Global Wars (2014) =

Professional wrestling supershow

- Promotional poster for the event
- Promotion(s): New Japan Pro-Wrestling; Ring of Honor
- Date: May 10, 2014
- City: Toronto, Ontario, Canada
- Venue: Ted Reeve Arena
- Attendance: 1,500

Pay-per-view chronology
← Previous (NJPW) Wrestling Dontaku 2014 (ROH) Death Before Dishonor XI	Next → War of the Worlds

Border/Global Wars chronology
← Previous; 2013	Next → '15

NJPW in North America chronology
← Previous; Invasion Tour	Next → War of the Worlds

Global Wars was a professional wrestling supershow co-produced by the American Ring of Honor (ROH) and Japanese New Japan Pro-Wrestling (NJPW) promotions. The event took place on May 10, 2014, at the Ted Reeve Arena in Toronto, Ontario, Canada and aired live on internet pay-per-view (iPPV) through Ustream. The event was originally announced as "Border Wars", a name ROH had used for events in 2012 and 2013, before being re-branded as "Global Wars".

With the exception of one interpromotional match, wrestlers from NJPW and ROH were kept separated from each other with the bookers from each promotion handling their own half of the show. The event featured nine matches with three championships on the line; two from ROH and one from NJPW. In the undercard of the event, The Young Bucks retained the IWGP Junior Heavyweight Tag Team Championship and Jay Lethal the ROH World Television Championship. In the main event, Adam Cole successfully defended the ROH World Championship against former champion Kevin Steen.

== Production ==
=== Background ===
Prior to Ring of Honor's (ROH) February 2014 HonorCon weekend in Philadelphia, Pennsylvania, the promotion had teased a "big announcement". The announcement was made during an ROH event on February 22, when ROH chief operating officer Joe Koff and booker Delirious along with New Japan Pro-Wrestling (NJPW) chairman Naoki Sugabayashi and his translator, referee Tiger Hattori, entered the ring to reveal a partnership, which would see the Japanese promotion's top wrestlers come over to North America for joint shows in May 2014. The first, titled Global Wars, would be set to take place on May 10 in Toronto, Ontario, and the second, titled War of the Worlds, on May 17 in New York City, New York. NJPW billed the events as its second tour of North America, following the NJPW Invasion Tour 2011 three years earlier. During the next few weeks, ROH announced the NJPW wrestlers taking part in the two events; IWGP Heavyweight Champion Kazuchika Okada, IWGP Intercontinental Champion Hiroshi Tanahashi, Shinsuke Nakamura, NJPW bookers Gedo and Jado, Takaaki Watanabe, Jyushin Thunder Liger, Kushida, Karl Anderson, Forever Hooligans (Alex Koslov and Rocky Romero), and The Young Bucks (Matt and Nick Jackson), who are regulars for both NJPW and ROH, holding the IWGP Junior Heavyweight Tag Team and ROH World Tag Team Championships between the two promotions. NJPW workers not taking part in the North American tour were instead announced for a simultaneous tour of Thailand. The first non-NJPW worker announced for the event was ROH regular A.J. Styles, who, however, signed a NJPW contract before the end of March. ROH also announced that the two promotions would host a tryout seminar on May 13 and 14 in Bristol, Pennsylvania. On March 27, ROH announced that the two events would be broadcast live on internet pay-per-view through Ustream, which had successfully broadcast NJPW iPPVs for the past two years. Previously, ROH had used various sites to broadcast their own iPPVs, often facing streaming issues, which even led to the promotion announcing they were no longer going to be doing live iPPVs.

Global Wars, unlike War of the Worlds, mainly featured matches, where NJPW and ROH wrestlers were kept apart from each other, leading to Gedo and Jado booking their own half of the show and Delirious the other half. Matches for the event were announced sporadically between March 20 and May 1. On May 8, ROH announced that the iPPV would be preceded by a free live pre-show.

=== Storylines ===
Global Wars featured nine professional wrestling matches that involved different wrestlers from pre-existing scripted feuds and storylines. Wrestlers portrayed villains, heroes, or less distinguishable characters in the scripted events that built tension and culminated in a wrestling match or series of matches.

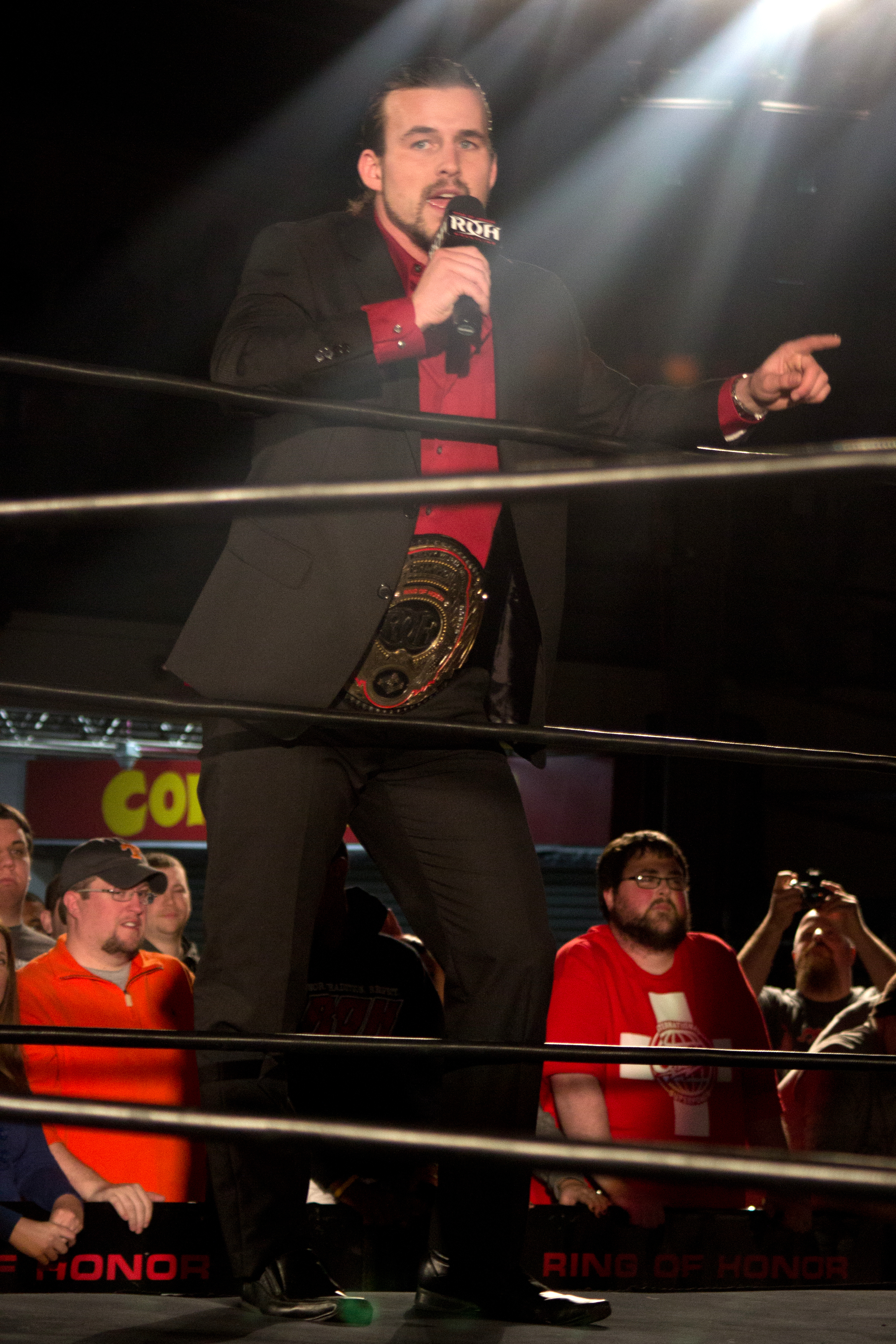
ROH World Champion Adam Cole

The event was headlined by an ROH World Championship match between champion Adam Cole and challenger Kevin Steen. On March 20, ROH announced that Steen would receive a title shot at the event against the winner of a ladder match between Adam Cole and Jay Briscoe on April 4 at Supercard of Honor VIII. The match was a culmination of a six-month-long storyline, where Briscoe, who had previously been stripped of the ROH World Championship, introduced his own version of the title, calling himself the true champion. Cole ended up winning the ladder match, unifying the two titles and moving onto the title match with Steen. Global Wars took place at the same arena where Steen won his thus far only ROH World Championship almost exactly two years earlier.

Two other title matches also took place at Global Wars; one for ROH's World Television Championship and the other for NJPW's IWGP Junior Heavyweight Tag Team Championship. The ROH World Television Championship match was built around a storyline involving the House of Truth stable. After losing to title to Tommaso Ciampa at Final Battle 2013, Matt Taven turned on the House of Truth on January 25, 2014, and fired Truth Martini as his manager. Martini then tried to recruit Taven's rival Silas Young as the newest member of his stable, but was turned down. On April 4 at Supercard of Honor VIII, Martini found himself a new managee, when he helped Jay Lethal defeat Ciampa to become the new World Television Champion. Lethal's first title defense the following day against Alex Koslov ended without a winner, when Taven ran in to attack Martini, which led to him also brawling with Lethal. On April 23, ROH announced that at Global Wars Lethal would defend his title in a four-way match with Taven, Ciampa and Young.

Also on April 23, it was announced that Alex Shelley, who had worked regularly for ROH between 2004 and 2006, would return to the promotion at Global Wars, where he will team with his NJPW tag team partner Kushida as the Time Splitters. Later that same day, ROH announced that the Time Splitters would be challenging for the IWGP Junior Heavyweight Tag Team Championship in a three-way match, which also includes The Young Bucks and Forever Hooligans, who would first face off in a title match at NJPW's Wrestling Dontaku 2014 on May 3. The three teams have a storied history with each other in NJPW. Time Splitters' only previous reign as the champions started on November 11, 2012, at Power Struggle (2012), where they defeated Forever Hooligans. They held the title for six months before losing it back to Forever Hooligans on March 3, 2013, at Wrestling Dontaku 2013. The Young Bucks debuted with NJPW in late October 2013 and captured the title from Suzuki-gun (Taichi and Taka Michinoku) only weeks later at Power Struggle (2013). On January 4, 2014, at Wrestle Kingdom 8 in Tokyo Dome, The Young Bucks successfully defended the title in a four-way match with Forever Hooligans, Time Splitters and Suzuki-gun and followed that up with a successful title defense against Time Splitters on February 11 at The New Beginning in Osaka. The Young Bucks retained the title at Wrestling Dontaku 2014, moving on to Global Wars as the defending champions.

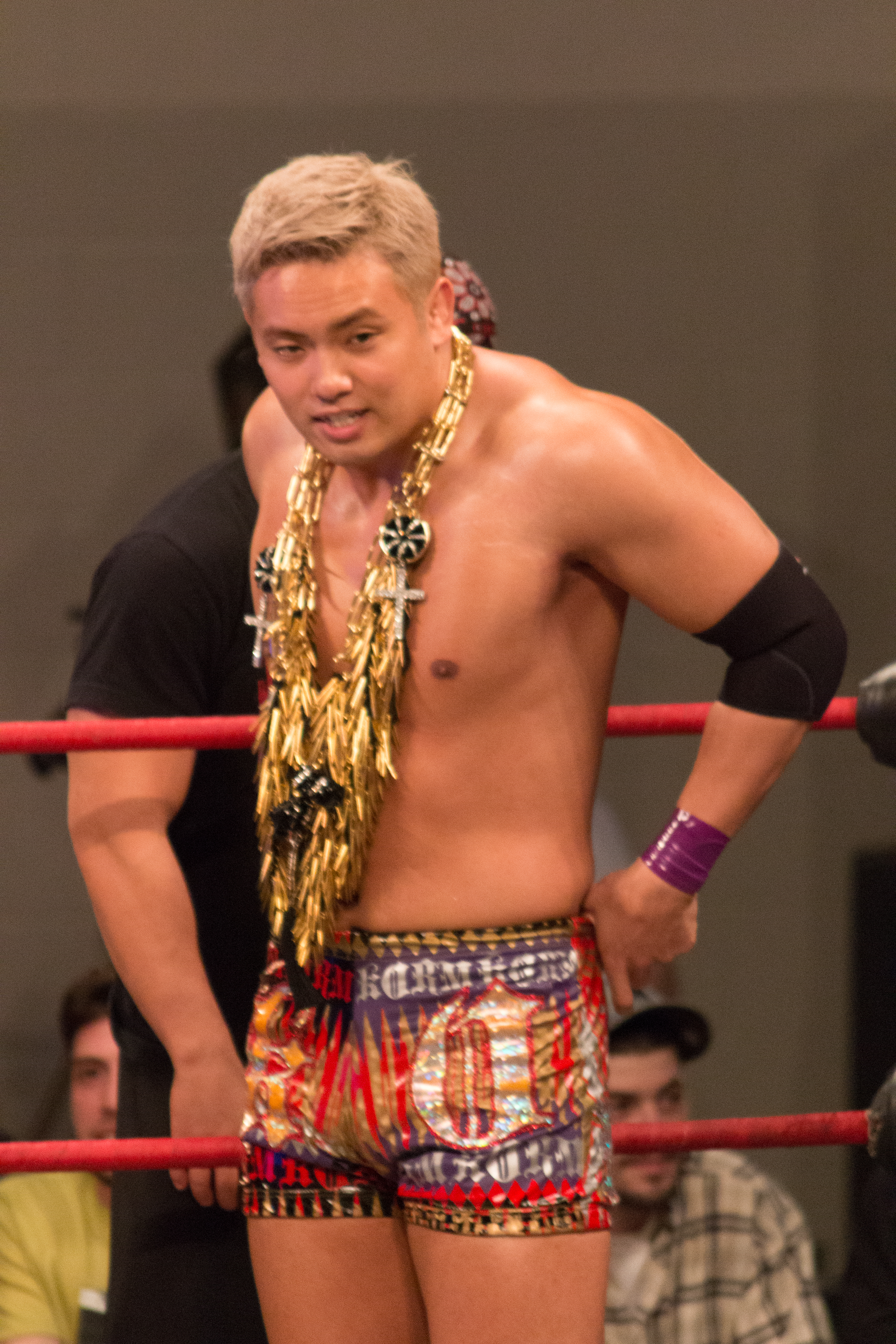
Kazuchika Okada

The NJPW side of card was completed on April 23 with the addition of two tag team matches featuring some of the promotion's biggest stars. In the first Hiroshi Tanahashi and Jyushin Thunder Liger face Chaos' Jado and Shinsuke Nakamura. For the past months, Tanahashi and Nakamura had feuding for the IWGP Intercontinental Championship, main eventing three of NJPW's first four big shows of the year. At Wrestle Kingdom 8 in Tokyo Dome, Tanahashi captured the title from Nakamura and successfully defended it against him in a rematch at The New Beginning in Hiroshima, before losing it back to him at Invasion Attack 2014. The other tag team match featured Bullet Club's A.J. Styles and Karl Anderson taking on Chaos' Gedo and Kazuchika Okada. After signing with NJPW, Styles made his debut as the newest member of Bullet Club at Invasion Attack 2014 on April 6, attacking Okada and setting himself up as the next challenger for his IWGP Heavyweight Championship. Styles, adopting the villainous persona associated with the Bullet Club stable, referred to Okada as a "young boy" (rookie), remembering a time, when the two worked together for the Total Nonstop Action Wrestling (TNA) promotion. On May 3 at Wrestling Dontaku 2014, Styles defeated Okada to become the new IWGP Heavyweight Champion. At Global Wars Styles was set to team with Bullet Club founding member and then-leader Karl Anderson, who was also one half of the reigning IWGP Tag Team Champions, while Okada was set to team with Gedo who, while also an active wrestler, had been positioned as his manager and mouthpiece since his return from TNA in January 2012.

The only interpromotional match of the event was announced on April 23 and saw ROH's Michael Elgin face NJPW's Takaaki Watanabe. In the months prior to Global Wars, Watanabe was inactive from NJPW as he was touring the world "in an effort to improve his skills". Elgin on the other hand was set to challenge for the IWGP Heavyweight Championship at War of the Worlds.

On April 28, ROH announced another match for Global Wars between Cedric Alexander and Roderick Strong. This match was part of an ongoing storyline, where Strong's villainous group of ROH veterans, The Decade, targeted rookies they deemed disrespectful. Some rookies like Adam Page and TaDarius Thomas were broken by The Decade and joined the group to "earn respect the right way and the traditional way". Alexander, the leader of the movement against The Decade, previously met Strong at Supercard of Honor VIII, but lost due to outside interference from The Decade, leading to a rematch at Global Wars, where the group was banned from ringside. The ROH side of the card was finished on May 1 with the addition of a singles match between A. C. H. and Michael Bennett and a three-way tag team match between The Briscoes (Jay and Mark), The Decade (B. J. Whitmer and Jimmy Jacobs) and reDRagon (Bobby Fish and Kyle O'Reilly).

== Event ==
Other on-screen personnel
Role:	Name:
Commentators	Kevin Kelly
Commentators	Steve Corino
Commentators	Michael Elgin
Commentators	Nigel McGuinness
Ring announcers	Bobby Cruise
Referees	Brian Gorie
Referees	Gino Colucci
Referees	Marty Asami
Referees	Paul Turner
Referees	Tiger Hattori
Referees	Todd Sinclair

=== Pre-show ===
The pre-show of the pay-per-view featured an ROH match, where TaDarius Thomas, accompanied by Jimmy Jacobs, defeated The Romantic Touch with a tiger suplex.

=== Preliminary matches ===
The first match of the pay-per-view saw ACH take on Michael Bennett, who was accompanied to the ring by his fiancée Maria Kanellis. Late in the match, Kanellis climbed on the ring apron to break up a pinfall. ACH confronted Kanellis, but managed to duck out of the way of a Bennett spear, which hit her instead. After a missed 450° splash by ACH, Bennett hit him with another spear, before going for his finishing submission hold, Go Back to Japan. ACH, however, slipped out of the hold and climbed the ropes, but was crotched, when Bennett pushed the referee of the match to the ring ropes. Bennett then dropped ACH down to the mat with a Dominator, before pinning him for the win. Following the match, Bennett sent out a warning to his War of the Worlds opponent, Hiroshi Tanahashi, before carrying Kanellis backstage.

The second match of the pay-per-view was the event's only interpromotional match with ROH's Toronto native Michael Elgin taking on NJPW's Takaaki Watanabe. Elgin won the match after hitting a diving Watanabe mid-air with a spinning back fist and following that up with a combination of a turnbuckle powerbomb and an Elgin Bomb. Post-match, the two men shook hands before Elgin raised Watanabe's hand in the air.

Up next was a three-way tag team match between the Briscoes, The Decade and reDRagon. Towards the end of the match, The Decade hit their finishing maneuver, the All Seeing Eye on Fish, but Mark Briscoe prevented a pinfall, before coming together with Jay to hit Jacobs with the Doomsday Device for the win. Post-match, reDRagon announced they were filing a protest over the referee losing control of the match.

In the next match The Decade's Roderick Strong took on Cedric Alexander in a "Battle of the Backbreakers". Strong dominated most of the match, but was unable to finish off Alexander. In the finish of the match, Strong went for his finishing maneuver, the End of Heartache, which Alexander countered into a small package for a three count and a win. Post-match, the rest of The Decade, who had been banned from ringside for the duration of the match, attacked Alexander with Strong dropping him with the End of Heartache onto a group of four steel chairs.

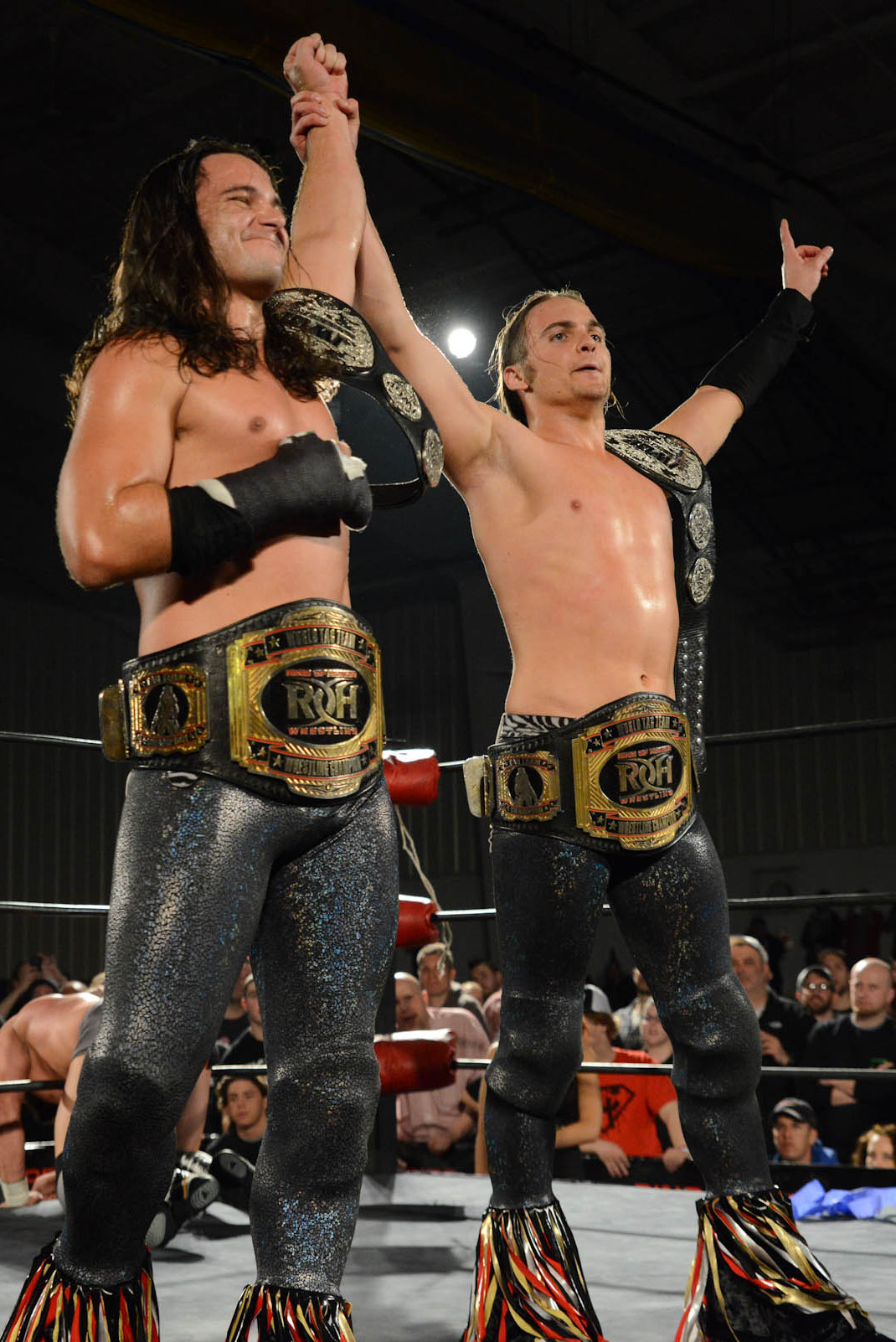
The Young Bucks made their fifth successful defense of the IWGP Junior Heavyweight Tag Team Championship at Global Wars

The fifth match of the pay-per-view was the first title match as well as the first match to feature only NJPW-contracted workers. It saw The Young Bucks defend their IWGP Junior Heavyweight Tag Team Championship in a three-way match against Forever Hooligans and Time Splitters. Towards the end of the match, Alex Shelley went for his finishing maneuver, the Sliced Bread #2, but was countered and hit with a Springboard spike tombstone piledriver by The Young Bucks. After a series of six superkicks on their opponents, The Young Bucks hit the More Bang for Your Buck on Koslov for the win. This marked The Young Bucks' fifth successful title defense.

Following an intermission, ROH wrestler R.D. Evans came out, accompanied by his manservant Ramón, and began gloating over his win streak, which he claimed was now at 104–0. Evans then handed ring announcer Bobby Cruise an envelope, which would reveal his next opponent, noting it was someone who was also undefeated. Cruise opened the envelope and read out his own name from the paper. Evans then rolled Cruise up with a schoolboy, while Ramón performed a three count to add another "win" to his streak.

The sixth match was another NJPW match, where Hiroshi Tanahashi and Jyushin Thunder Liger took on Jado and Shinsuke Nakamura. Near the end of the match, Jado locked Tanahashi in the Crossface of Jado, while Nakamura held Liger back from saving his partner. Tanahashi, however, managed to put his foot on the ring rope to force the referee to break up the hold. Jado then hit Tanahashi with the Green Killer, but missed a punt and was hit with a palm strike by Liger. Liger then dove out of the ring onto Nakamura, while Tanahashi hit Jado with the Sling Blade, followed by the High Fly Flow for the win.

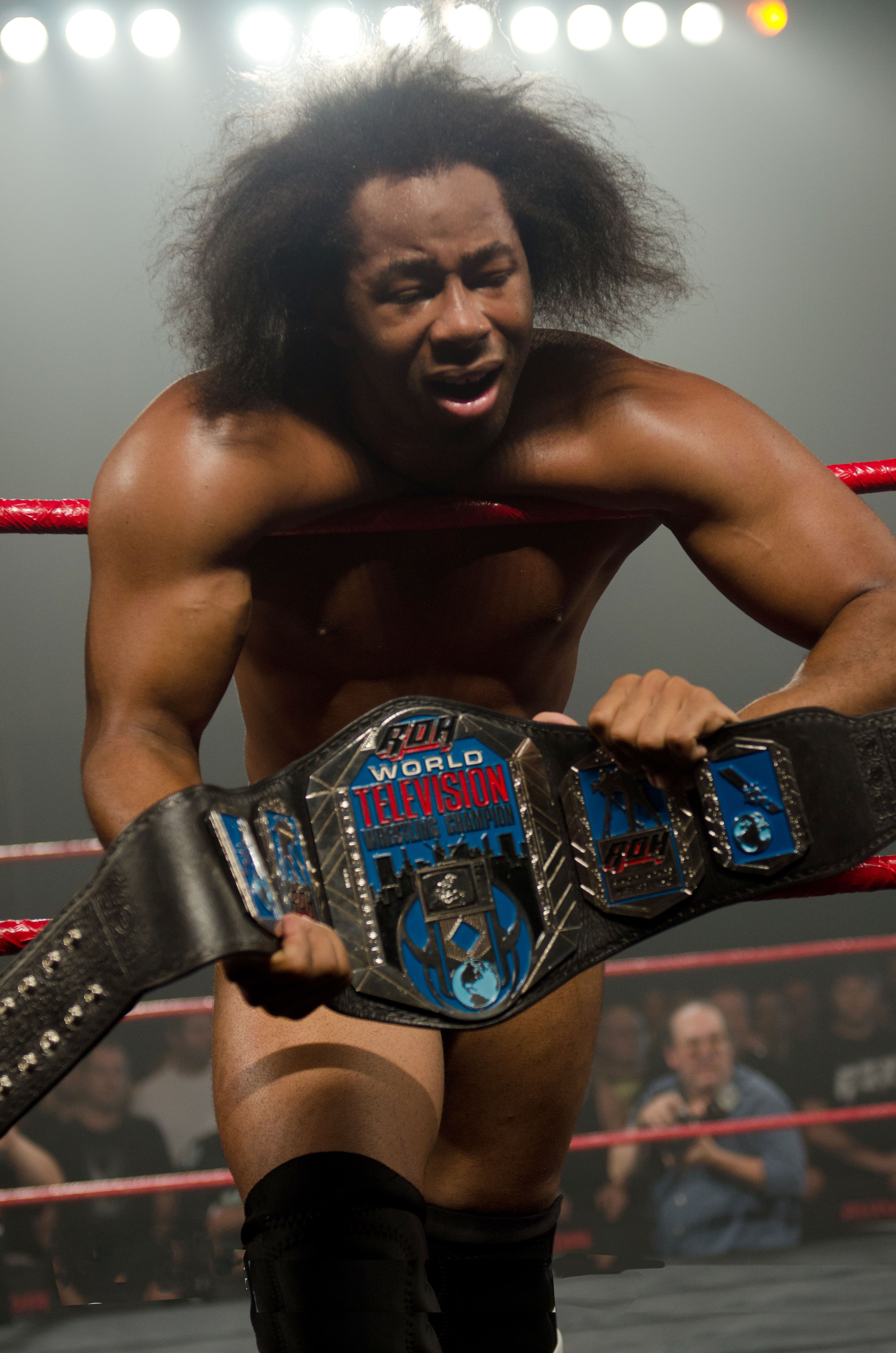
Jay Lethal, who successfully defended the ROH World Television Championship during the event

In the seventh match, Jay Lethal, accompanied by his new manager Truth Martini, defended the ROH World Television Championship in a four-way match against Matt Taven, Silas Young and Tommaso Ciampa. The match was built around Taven trying to get his hands on Martini. However, when he finally did manage to grab Martini, Lethal saved his manager by hitting Taven with a Lethal Injection to score the pinfall and retain his title. Post-match, ROH matchmaker Nigel McGuinness, who had been doing commentary for the past two matches, left his position to reprimand the referee of the match for allowing Martini's interference.

=== Main event matches ===
The final NJPW match of the pay-per-view featured Bullet Club's A.J. Styles and Karl Anderson taking on Chaos' Gedo and Kazuchika Okada. In the finish of the match, Bullet Club separated Gedo from his partner with Anderson hitting him with his finishing maneuver, the Gun Stun. Styles then dropped Gedo with the Bloody Sunday, before planting him with the Styles Clash. While Anderson held Okada back, Styles pinned Gedo for the win. After the match, Michael Elgin, who had been doing commentary for the match, entered the ring to confront Styles, building up their match for the IWGP Heavyweight Championship at War of the Worlds. Okada then also entered the staredown as he was set to face the winner at NJPW's Back to the Yokohama Arena event on May 25.

In the final match of the event, Adam Cole defended the ROH World Championship against Kevin Steen, who entered the arena carrying the flag of his native Canada. Towards the end of the match, Cole's associate Michael Bennett entered the ring to interfere, but was hit with a low blow by Steen and dropped with the package piledriver. Cole then hit Steen with a superkick and a German suplex, followed by the Florida Key, but Steen kicked out of the resulting pinfall attempt. Cole then went for another one of his finishing maneuvers, the Panama Sunrise, but it was countered into a sharpshooter. Cole managed to force the referee to break the hold after reaching the ring ropes. Steen then stopped Cole on the top turnbuckle, before dropping him onto it with a brainbuster, a move commonly associated with his former tag team partner El Generico. Cole, however, managed to kick out of the following pinfall attempt. Finally, Steen went to hit a package piledriver on Cole, but the champion slipped out of it and hit his challenger with a superkick, which was enough for a three count and a successful title defense.

== Reception ==
411Mania's Larry Csonka compared the event to the Fantastica Mania events, which NJPW had presented with Mexican promotion Consejo Mundial de Lucha Libre, calling it a "showcase of both brands" and "good, but unspectacular". Csonka gave the IWGP Junior Heavyweight Tag Team Championship match the highest rating of four out of five stars with the ROH World Championship match second at three and three quarters. Csonka also noted Global Wars "felt like an appetizer for next week's more anticipated show" (War of the Worlds). Pro Wrestling Insider's Jonathan Murphy called the IWGP Junior Heavyweight Tag Team Championship match an "amazing match with lots of athleticism" and the main event "decent", while noting that the pro-Steen crowd was not sent home happy. Jason Namako of WrestleView called the tag title match "pure insanity", while naming the main event the best match on the show. Overall, he called Global Wars a "fun mix of the show", noting it did a good job introducing the Japanese wrestlers to an American audience, while giving a taste for War of the Worlds. Dave Meltzer of the Wrestling Observer Newsletter called Global Wars well paced and the work strong, noting there was "nothing remotely resembling a bad match". He also praised the crowd at Ted Reeve Arena, calling it "perhaps the best big show wrestling crowd in recent memory", noting that they treated the Japanese wrestlers, especially Jyushin Thunder Liger, like superstars. He called the tag team title match a "show stealer", noting that it "wasn't that far off match of the year consideration", giving it four and a half stars out of five. In a roundtable review of the event for Pro Wrestling Torch, Greg Parks, James Caldwell, Mike Metzger and Sean Radican all had similar comments about Global Wars not being a "must-see show", calling it a "warm up for War of the Worlds". Parks complemented the event for having something for everyone from comedy to strong style and technical prowess. Several reviewers complemented the quality of the internet stream in light of ROH's previous issues with their iPPVs. Reviewers also praised the announcing team of Kevin Kelly and Steve Corino for their insight into the backgrounds and personalities of the Japanese performers.

== Aftermath ==
After the iPPV ended, Kevin Steen gave a thank you speech to the crowd, which some took as a goodbye speech. Steen had recently attended a WWE tryout camp and his ROH contract was set to expire in late July. On May 14, ROH announced that Cedric Alexander had to pull out of his scheduled War of the Worlds match with Kazuchika Okada, claiming he had been injured in the post-match attack by Roderick Strong and The Decade. Alexander, however, made an appearance at War of the Worlds, attacking The Decade. As a result of Alexander being pulled from the event, Okada was added to the IWGP Heavyweight Championship match at War of the Worlds, making it a three-way match. Styles pinned Elgin to win the match and make his first successful title defense. After successfully defending the IWGP Junior Heavyweight Tag Team Championship at Global Wars, The Young Bucks lost their other title, the ROH World Tag Team Championship, to reDRagon at War of the Worlds. ROH World Television Champion Jay Lethal and ROH World Champion Adam Cole, meanwhile, both made successful defenses of their titles against Kushida and Jyushin Thunder Liger, respectively. NJPW was victorious in the other two big interpromotional matches at War of the Worlds, with Hiroshi Tanahashi defeating Michael Bennett and Shinsuke Nakamura Kevin Steen. Global Wars was released on DVD by ROH on June 17, 2014. The three NJPW tag team matches were later broadcast on the July 12 episode of Ring of Honor Wrestling.

== Results ==
No.	Results	Stipulations	Times
1^{P}	TaDarius Thomas (with Jimmy Jacobs) defeated The Romantic Touch	Singles match	—
2	Michael Bennett (with Maria Kanellis) defeated A. C. H.	Singles match	07:51
3	Michael Elgin defeated Takaaki Watanabe	Singles match	06:40
4	The Briscoes (Jay Briscoe and Mark Briscoe) defeated The Decade (B. J. Whitmer and Jimmy Jacobs) (with TaDarius Thomas) and reDRagon (Bobby Fish and Kyle O'Reilly)	Three-way tag team match	07:35
5	Cedric Alexander defeated Roderick Strong	Singles match; The Decade was banned from ringside	14:20
6	The Young Bucks (Matt Jackson and Nick Jackson) (c) defeated Forever Hooligans (Alex Koslov and Rocky Romero) and Time Splitters (Alex Shelley and Kushida)	Three-way tag team match for the IWGP Junior Heavyweight Tag Team Championship	12:38
7	Hiroshi Tanahashi and Jyushin Thunder Liger defeated Chaos (Jado and Shinsuke Nakamura)	Tag team match	11:28
8	Jay Lethal (c) (with Truth Martini) defeated Matt Taven, Silas Young and Tommaso Ciampa	Four corner survival match for the ROH World Television Championship	07:25
9	Bullet Club (A.J. Styles and Karl Anderson) defeated Chaos (Gedo and Kazuchika Okada)	Tag team match	11:22
10	Adam Cole (c) defeated Kevin Steen	Singles match for the ROH World Championship	19:13
(c) / – the champion(s) heading into the match; P / – the match was broadcast on the pre-show

== See also ==
- Professional wrestling in Canada
