= Border Wars (2012) =

Professional wrestling event

- Promotion: Ring of Honor
- Date: May 12, 2012
- City: Toronto, Ontario, Canada
- Venue: Ted Reeve Arena
- Tagline: The Battle Lines Are Drawn

Pay-per-view chronology
← Previous; Showdown in the Sun	Next → Best in the World 2012: Hostage Crisis

Border Wars chronology
← Previous —	Next → 2013

Border Wars was a professional wrestling pay-per-view (PPV) event produced by Ring of Honor (ROH) that took place on May 12, 2012, at the Ted Reeve Arena in Toronto, Ontario, Canada.

== Production ==
=== Storylines ===
Other on-screen personnel
Role	Name
Commentators	Kevin Kelly
Commentators	Nigel McGuinness

ROH Border Wars professional wrestling matches involving different wrestlers from pre-existing scripted feuds, plots, and storylines that played out on Ring of Honor's (ROH) television programs. Wrestlers portrayed villains or heroes as they followed a series of events that built tension and culminated in a wrestling match or series of matches.

== Results ==
No.	Results	Stipulations	Times
1^{D}	Grizzly Redwood defeated Delirious	Singles match	11:01
2	Eddie Edwards defeated Rhino (with Truth Martini)	Singles match	11:01
3	The All Night Express (Rhett Titus and Kenny King) and T. J. Perkins defeated The Young Bucks (Matt Jackson and Nick Jackson) and Mike Mondo	Six-man tag team match	12:58
4	Jay Lethal defeated Tommaso Ciampa	Singles match	10:52
5	Lance Storm defeated Mike Bennett (with Bob Evans)	Singles match	12:35
6	Michael Elgin defeated Adam Cole	Singles match	13:55
7	Roderick Strong (c) (with Truth Martini) defeated Fit Finlay	Singles match for the ROH World Television Championship	17:16
8	Wrestling's Greatest Tag Team (Charlie Haas and Shelton Benjamin) defeated The Briscoe Brothers (Jay Briscoe and Mark Briscoe) (c)	Fight Without Honor for the ROH World Tag Team Championship	14:31
9	Kevin Steen defeated Davey Richards (c)	Singles match for the ROH World Championship	24:25
(c) / – the champion(s) heading into the match; D / – this was a dark match

== See also ==
- Professional wrestling in Canada
