= Global Wars '15 =

Professional wrestling event

- Promotional poster for the event, featuring wrestlers from both NJPW and ROH
- Promotion(s): New Japan Pro-Wrestling; Ring of Honor
- Date: May 15 and 16, 2015
- City: Toronto, Ontario, Canada
- Venue: Ted Reeve Arena
- Attendance: 1,500 (both nights)

Pay-per-view chronology
← Previous (ROH) ROH 13th Anniversary Show / (NJPW) Wrestling Dontaku	Next → (ROH) Best in the World '15 / (NJPW) Dominion 7.5 in Osaka-jo Hall

Global Wars chronology
← Previous; 2014	Next → 2016

Global Wars '15 was a two-day professional wrestling supershow co-produced by the American Ring of Honor (ROH) and Japanese New Japan Pro-Wrestling (NJPW) promotions. The events took place on May 15 and 16, 2015, at the Ted Reeve Arena in Toronto, Ontario, Canada, with the first night airing live on internet pay-per-view (iPPV) and the second on tape delay as part of the weekly Ring of Honor Wrestling program.

Global Wars '15 was the second annual Global Wars event co-produced by ROH and NJPW, following Global Wars, which took place on May 10, 2014, also at the Ted Reeve Arena.

== Production ==
=== Background ===
On January 4, 2015, at their Wrestle Kingdom 9 in Tokyo Dome show, New Japan Pro-Wrestling (NJPW) announced that it would for the second year in a row co-produce an event with Ring of Honor (ROH) in May. At that point, no specific dates were announced and only the United States was named as a location. However, on February 25, ROH sent out a press release, announcing three co-produced events, as opposed to two shows in 2014, with War of the Worlds '15 taking place on May 13 in Philadelphia and Global Wars '15 on May 15 and 16 in Toronto, Canada. On March 7, War of the Worlds '15 was also expanded to a two-day event, taking place over May 12 and 13. ROH began announcing the NJPW wrestlers taking part in the events on April 1, starting with Hiroshi Tanahashi. Over the next nine days, ROH announced the remaining NJPW participants; Kazuchika Okada, Jyushin Thunder Liger, Tetsuya Naito, Takaaki Watanabe, Kushida, Gedo, and finally Shinsuke Nakamura. On April 16, ROH announced that the Bullet Club quintet of A.J. Styles, Doc Gallows, Karl Anderson, Matt Jackson and Nick Jackson would also be taking part in the Global Wars '15 events. On April 22, ROH announced all nine matches for the first night of Global Wars '15. The following day, ROH announced seven matches for the second night. An eighth match for the second night was announced on May 6. Also announced were pre-show autograph sessions for May 15 and 16, which would be attended by both NJPW and ROH wrestlers taking part in the tour.

=== Storylines ===
The two Global Wars '15 events featured nine and fourteen professional wrestling matches that involved different wrestlers from pre-existing scripted feuds and storylines. Wrestlers portrayed villains, heroes, or less distinguishable characters in the scripted events that built tension and culminated in a wrestling match or series of matches.

Due to featuring wrestlers from two different promotions, the events focused less on storyline rivalries and more on interpromotional matchups, including the only title match of the two events, which saw ROH's Jay Lethal defend the ROH World Television Championship against NJPW's Tetsuya Naito on the first night. The first night was scheduled to feature a match between ROH's Chris Sabin and NJPW's Kushida, who are connected through their partnerships with Alex Shelley; Sabin was previously one half of The Motor City Machine Guns with Shelley, who now teamed with Kushida as the Time Splitters. On the day of the show, Kyle O'Reilly was added to the match, when his reDRagon tag team partner Bobby Fish, whom he was supposed to team with in a four-way tag team match, could not make the event due to travel issues. The first night also featured another interpromotional match between Cedric Alexander and Kazuchika Okada, which was originally announced for the previous year's War of the Worlds, but was canceled after Alexander was removed from the show with a storyline injury. The Bullet Club stable main evented both nights, facing a team of ROH's top wrestlers in a ten-man tag team match on the first night and the NJPW stable Chaos in a six-man tag team match on the second night. The main event of the second night also builds to a future IWGP Heavyweight Championship match between A.J. Styles and Kazuchika Okada.

== Reception ==
In his review of the first night, Pro Wrestling Dot Net's Zack Zimmerman wrote that in his mind the show "definitely delivered", but while there were no disappointing matches on the show, nothing reached the caliber of War of the Worlds '15's top matches. Dave Meltzer of the Wrestling Observer Newsletter called the show very good and stated that it was worth ordering just for the main event, which he called "ridiculous". He later awarded it four and a half stars out of five. However, in what he stated was a testament to the quality of the four shows, Meltzer also called the first night the weakest of the shows. In wrapping up the week, Meltzer dubbed Roderick Strong the ROH MVP of the four shows, writing that both Hiroshi Tanahashi and Shinsuke Nakamura were giving him rave reviews. Pro Wrestling Torch's Mike Metzger called the undercard of the first show "solid", stating that it did not overshadow the main event, which he awarded four and a quarter stars out of five.

== Aftermath ==
Matches from the second night started airing on Ring of Honor Wrestling on May 30. On August 21, 2015, NJPW and ROH declared that the relationship between the two promotions was stronger than ever, announcing two ROH shows in Tokyo in February 2016 and another NJPW tour of North America for May 2016, featuring new locations and wrestlers.

== Results ==
=== Night 1 ===
No.	Results	Stipulations	Times
1^{D}	Dalton Castle defeated Donovan Dijak	Singles match	—
2	Gedo and Moose (with Stokely Hathaway and Veda Scott) defeated Silas Young and Takaaki Watanabe	Tag team match	08:01
3	Kushida defeated Chris Sabin and Kyle O'Reilly	Three-way match	09:58
4	The Kingdom (Matt Taven and Michael Bennett) (with Maria Kanellis) defeated Jyushin Thunder Liger and Matt Sydal	Tag team match	09:12
5	Kazuchika Okada (with Gedo) defeated Cedric Alexander	Singles match	12:15
6	The Addiction (Christopher Daniels and Frankie Kazarian) defeated The Decade (Adam Page and B. J. Whitmer) (with Colby Corino) and Roppongi Vice (Beretta and Rocky Romero)	Three-way tag team match	14:39
7	Shinsuke Nakamura defeated A. C. H.	Singles match	12:39
8	Jay Lethal (c) (with Donovan Dijak) defeated Tetsuya Naito	Singles match for the ROH World Television Championship	12:18
9	Hiroshi Tanahashi defeated Michael Elgin	Singles match	17:08
10	ROH All Stars (Hanson, Jay Briscoe, Mark Briscoe, Ray Rowe and Roderick Strong) defeated Bullet Club (A.J. Styles, Doc Gallows, Karl Anderson, Matt Jackson and Nick Jackson)	Ten-man tag team match	16:48
(c) / – the champion(s) heading into the match; D / – this was a dark match

=== Night 2 ===
No.	Results	Stipulations	Times
1	Kushida defeated Will Ferrara	Singles match	05:15
2	Silas Young defeated Takaaki Watanabe	Singles match	06:18
3	Moose defeated Colby Corino (with Adam Page and B. J. Whitmer)	Singles match	02:44
4	The Briscoes (Jay Briscoe and Mark Briscoe) defeated The House of Truth (Donovan Dijak and J. Diesel) (with Truth Martini)	Tag team match	11:03
5	Kyle O'Reilly defeated The Addiction (Christopher Daniels and Frankie Kazarian) (c) by disqualification	Two-on-one handicap match for the ROH World Tag Team Championship	04:16
6	Jyushin Thunder Liger defeated Dalton Castle (with the Boys)	Singles match	09:58
7	Bob Evans vs. Cheeseburger ended in a no contest	Singles match	03:00
8	Bullet Club (Doc Gallows and Karl Anderson) vs. The Kingdom (Matt Taven and Michael Bennett) (with Maria Kanellis) ended in a double disqualification	Tag team match	09:38
9	War Machine (Hanson and Ray Rowe) defeated The Decade (Adam Page and Colby Corino) (with B. J. Whitmer)	Tag team match	02:12
10	Cedric Alexander defeated Moose (with Stokely Hathaway and Veda Scott)	Singles match	09:05
11	Hiroshi Tanahashi and Tetsuya Naito defeated A. C. H. and Matt Sydal	Tag team match	11:12
12	Shinsuke Nakamura defeated Roderick Strong	Singles match	17:05
13	Michael Elgin defeated Gedo	Singles match	08:05
14	Bullet Club (A.J. Styles, Matt Jackson and Nick Jackson) defeated Chaos (Beretta, Kazuchika Okada and Rocky Romero)	Six-man tag team match	17:25
(c) / – the champion(s) heading into the match

== See also ==
- Professional wrestling in Canada
