= KEMBA Live! =

Concert venue in Columbus, Ohio, U.S.

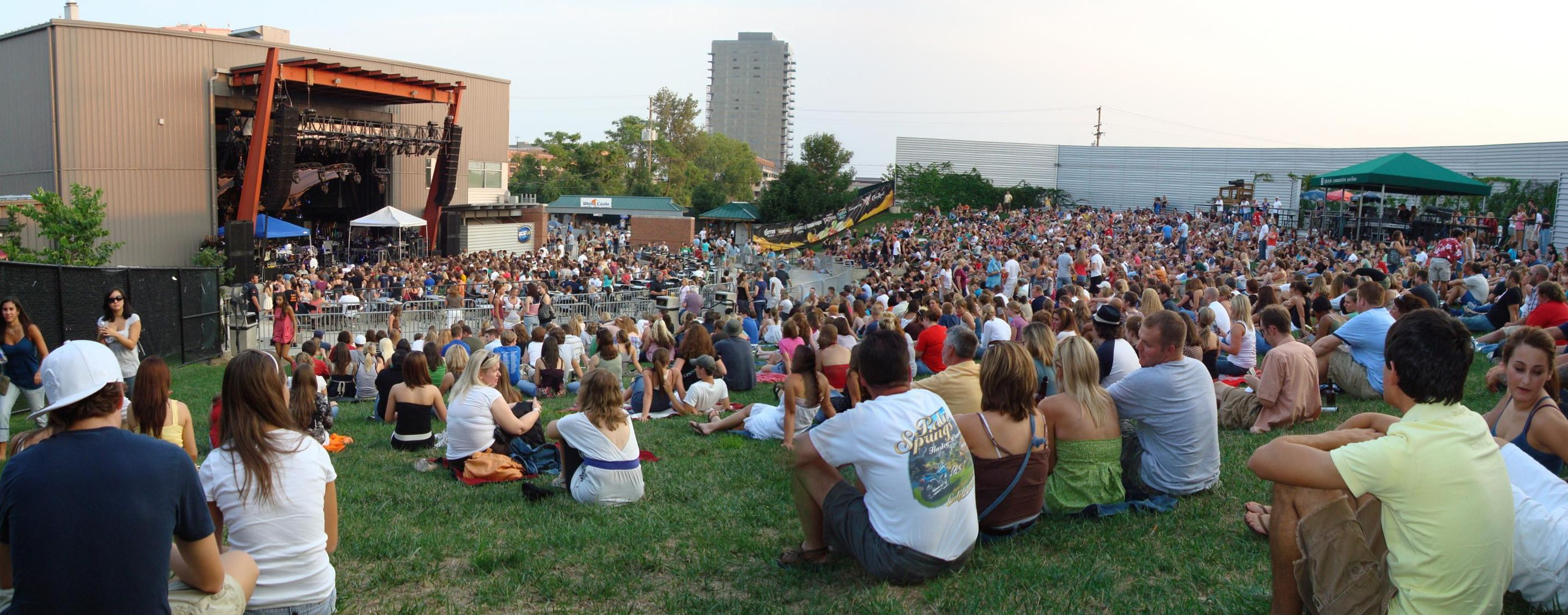
- Outdoor amphitheater during a Goo Goo Dolls concert
- Interactive map of KEMBA Live!
- Former names: PromoWest Pavilion (2001-05); Lifestyle Communities Pavilion (2005-16); Express Live! (2016-21)
- Address: 405 Neil Ave; Columbus, OH 43215-2341
- Location: Arena District
- Coordinates: 39.969811°N 83.010142°W
- Owner: Nationwide Realty
- Operator: PromoWest Productions
- Capacity: 2,300 (Indoor Music Hall); 5,200 (Outdoor Amphitheater)
- Public transit: 3, 8

Construction
- Opened: October 2, 2001
- Cost: $5.5 million

Website
- Official website

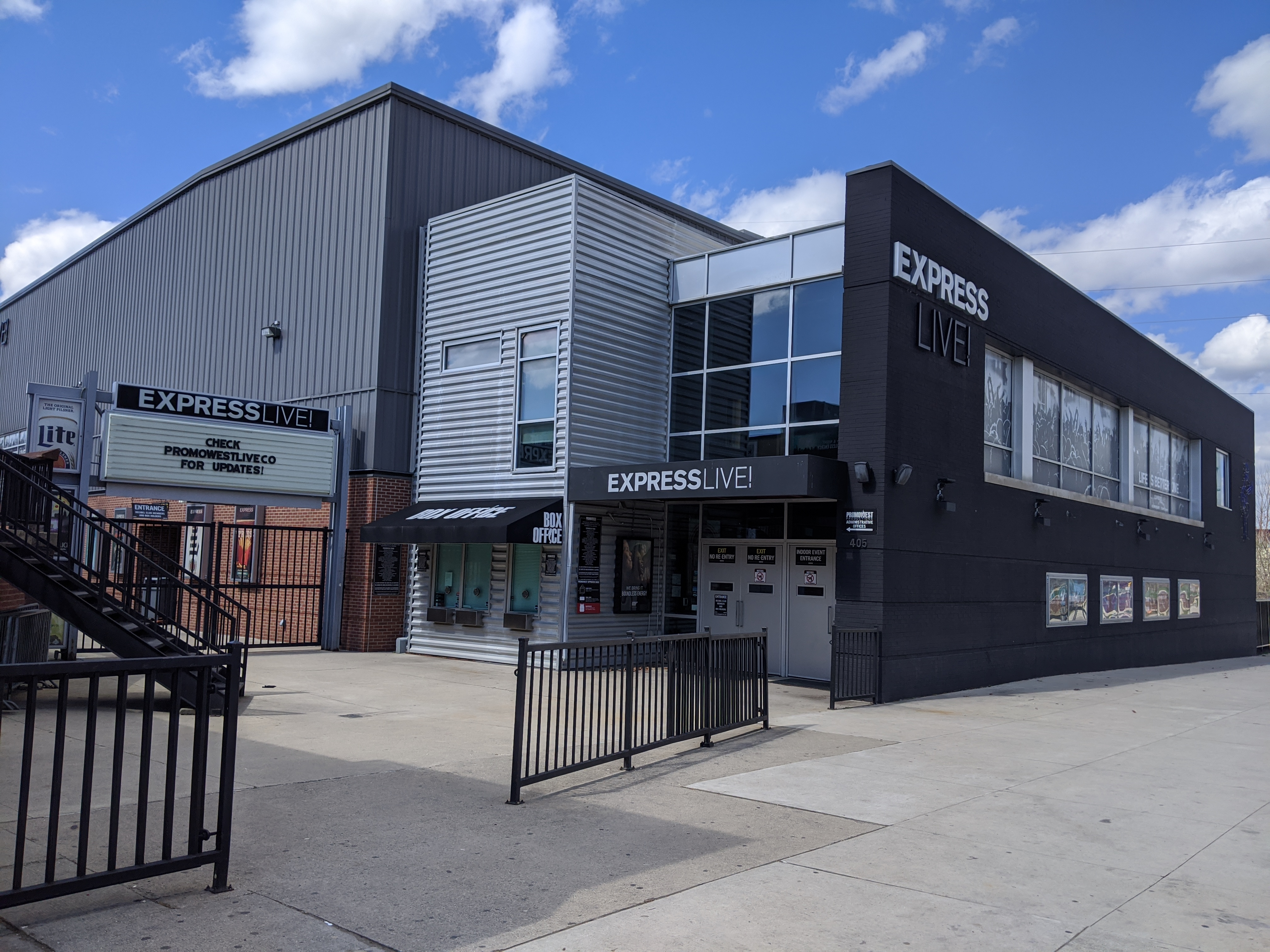
Indoor Music Hall

KEMBA Live! (originally the PromoWest Pavilion) is a multi-purpose concert venue located in the Arena District of Columbus, Ohio. Opening in 2001, the venues operates year-round with indoor and outdoor facilities: the Indoor Music Hall and Outdoor Amphitheater. The venue was modeled after the House of Blues and described as the "Newport Music Hall on steroids". It features state-of-the-art lighting, acoustical systems and a reversible stage. In 2001, the venue was nominated for a Pollstar Awards for "Best New Major Concert Venue".

A sister venue, Stage AE is located in Pittsburgh, Pennsylvania and opened in December 2010. In 2018, Promowest Productions and its venues were acquired by American entertainment presenter AEG. In August 2021, PromoWest Productions and AEG opened another sister venue, MegaCorp Pavilion, in Newport, Kentucky (near Cincinnati, Ohio).

== Names ==
- PromoWest Pavilion (October 2, 2001—September 30, 2005)
- Lifestyle Communities Pavilion (October 1, 2005—December 31, 2015)
- Express Live! (January 27, 2016—December 31, 2021)
- KEMBA Live! (January 1, 2022—Present)

== Notable performances ==
- WWE NXT (2015, 2016, 2025)
- Ring of Honor (2017, 2018, 2019)
  - Global Wars 2017 with New Japan Pro-Wrestling
  - Masters of the Craft 2018 and 2019
  - Survival of the Fittest
  - Unauthorized
- LCD Soundsystem (2025)
- Insane Clown Posse, Ouija Macc, DJ Clay, Shaggy The Airhead, Wakko The Kidd, Mike E. Clark, World's Most Dangerous Stunt Show Juggalo Championship Wrestling Big Ballas Holiday Party (2024)
- Insane Clown Posse, Juggalo Championship Wrestling (2025)
