= Stage AE =

Multi-purpose entertainment complex located in Pittsburgh, Pennsylvania

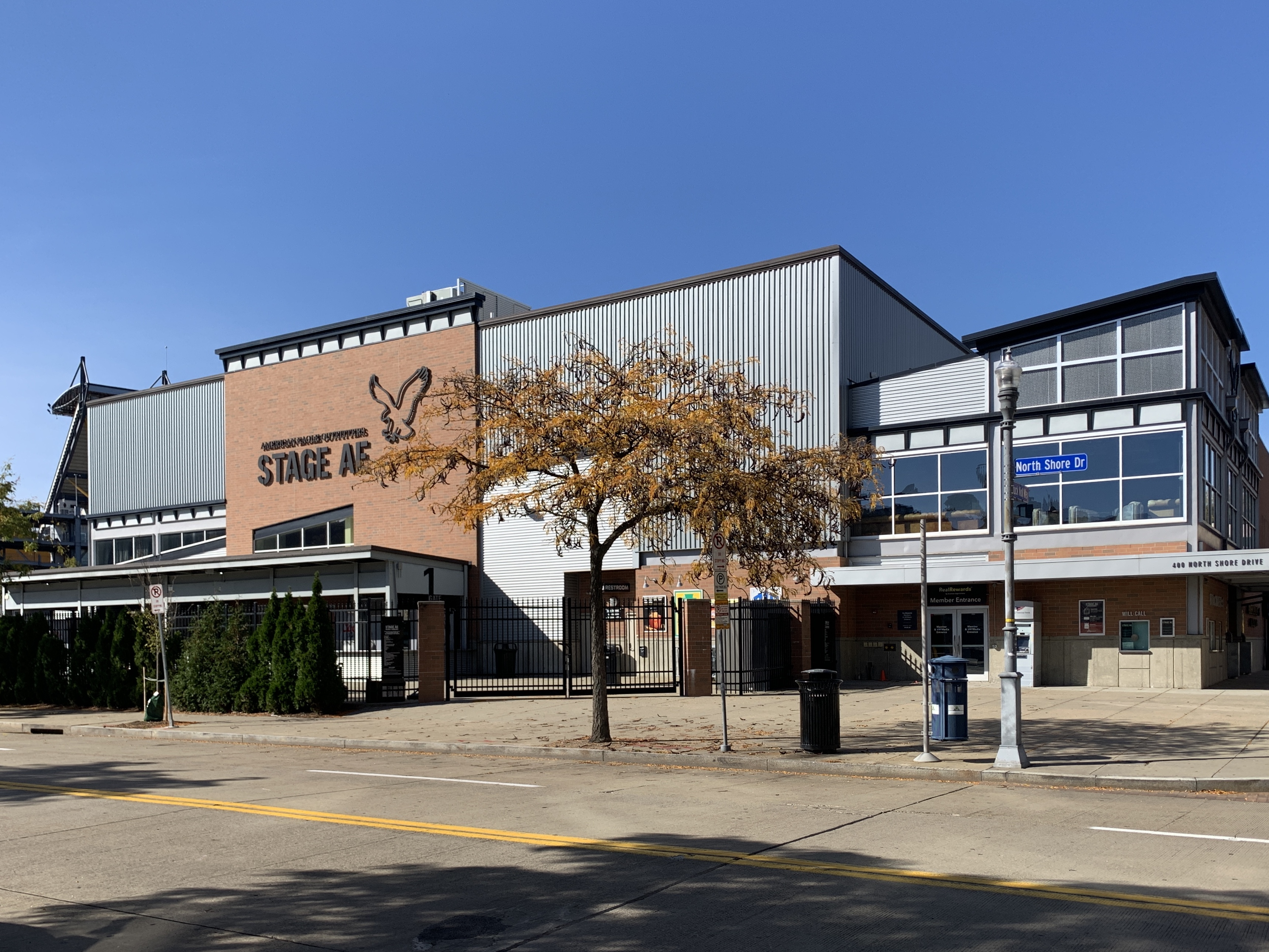
- External view of building, October 2020
- Interactive map of Stage AE
- Former names: North Shore Entertainment Complex (planning/construction)
- Address: 400 N Shore Dr; Pittsburgh, Pennsylvania, United States 15212-5867
- Location: North Shore
- Coordinates: 40°26′46″N 80°00′44″W
- Owner: PSSI Stadium LLC, Continental Real Estate
- Operator: PromoWest Productions
- Capacity: 5,500 (Outdoor Lawn); 2,400 (Indoor Music Hall); 400 (The Club)
- Public transit: North Side

Construction
- Groundbreaking: April 25, 2010
- Opened: December 3, 2010
- Cost: $13 million
- Architect: WD Partners
- General contractor: Continental Building Systems

Stage AE is a multi-purpose entertainment complex located in Pittsburgh, Pennsylvania, United States. It contains an indoor concert hall and an outdoor amphitheatre. It is the second indoor/outdoor concert venue in America. Modeled after its predecessor, Express Live! in Columbus, the venue features state-of-the-art lighting, acoustical systems and an innovative reversible stage. Structurally, it is divided into three independent concert spaces: a music hall, club and outdoor amphitheater.

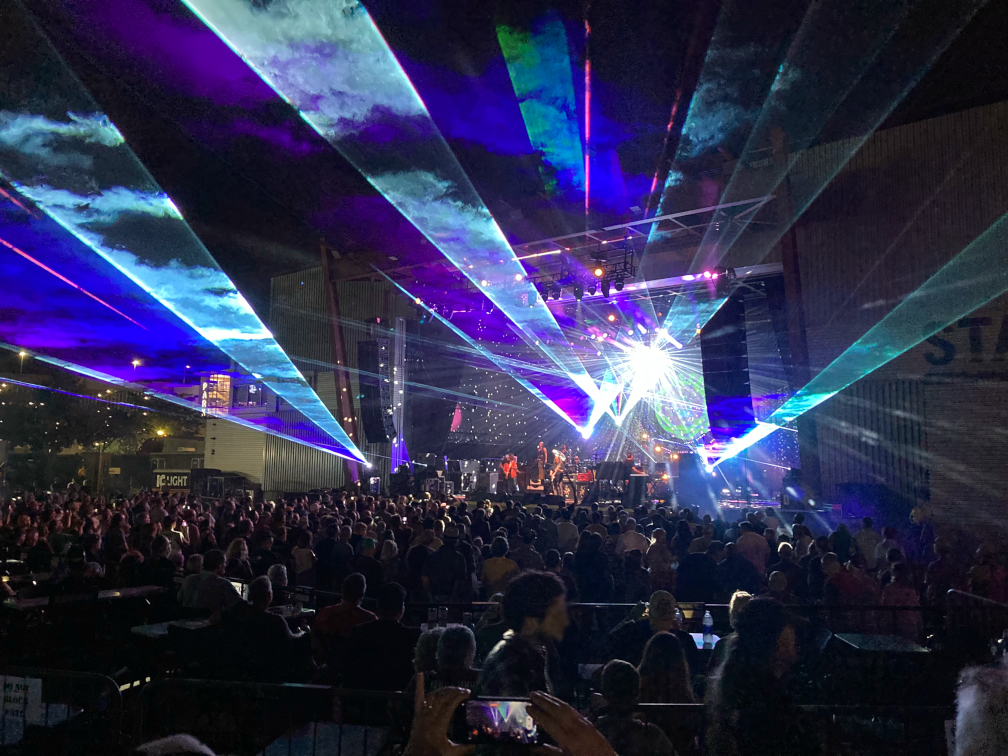
Concert on the outdoor stage at Stage AE at night time

== History ==
The complex sits adjacent to the Pittsburgh Steelers' Acrisure Stadium. The team, which held the rights to develop the land adjacent to the stadium (the site of the Steelers former home, Three Rivers Stadium), partially owns the venue along with Continental Real Estate Cos. of Columbus, Ohio. The cost of construction was $12 million, with $2.5 million funded from state taxes. Total space of the indoor venue is 22,000 square feet, while the outdoor lawns totals 30,000 square feet. When it opened, the complex was expected to host approximately 100 events per year. In June 2010, naming rights were granted to American Eagle Outfitters, a clothing retailer based in Pittsburgh's South Side neighborhood.

The venue opened in early December 2010 with two performances by Pittsburgh-native musician Girl Talk. Other performances in the first month included Cake and Anberlin, George Clinton and Parliament-Funkadelic, and Pittsburgh-natives Wiz Khalifa and The Clarks.

During the week before the 2011 NHL Winter Classic held at Heinz Field between the Pittsburgh Penguins and the Washington Capitals, the outdoor lawn of the venue held a skating rink that was open to the public. Leading up to the Steelers' hosting the 2011 AFC Championship game against the New York Jets, the venue hosted several concerts, parties, and rallies.

== Noted performers ==
=== Music ===
- AJR
- Alice Cooper
- Arctic Monkeys
- ASAP Rocky
- August Burns Red
- Baby Keem
- Between the Buried and Me
- Cake
- Charlie Puth
- Charli XCX
- Coheed and Cambria
- Cole Swindell
- Dave Matthews
- Daya
- Devo
- Dirty Heads
- Dropkick Murphys
- Ellie Goulding
- Fitz and the Tantrums
- G. Love & Special Sauce
- Gaelic Storm
- Gary Clark Jr.
- George Clinton and the Parliament-Funkadelic
- Ghost
- Girl Talk
- Goose
- Grace Potter
- Hozier
- Iced Earth
- Jack White
- Jacob Sartorius
- Jeff Rosenstock
- Juice WRLD
- Kid Cudi
- Kip Moore
- Lindsey Stirling
- Mac Miller
- Macklemore
- Marilyn Manson
- Marina and The Diamonds
- Mastodon
- Megadeth
- Meshuggah
- My Morning Jacket
- Neko Case
- Nightwish
- Opeth
- Panic! at the Disco
- Parachute
- Primus
- Pusha T
- Relient K
- Sara Bareilles
- Skrillex
- Sound Tribe Sector 9
- St. Vincent
- Switchfoot
- Tech N9ne
- Tenacious D
- TesseracT
- The 1975
- The Cab
- The Decemberists
- The Gin Blossoms
- The Kid LAROI
- The National
- The Raconteurs
- The Shins
- The String Cheese Incident
- The Wonder Years
- Third Eye Blind
- Tonic
- Trey Anastasio Band
- Twenty One Pilots
- Umphrey's McGee
- Walk the Moon
- Walker Hayes
- Weezer
- Wiz Khalifa
- Young the Giant

=== Professional wrestling ===
The venue is also used for professional wrestling. WWE, which normally runs its shows at the PPG Paints Arena for the main roster when visiting Pittsburgh, uses the venue for live events for its NXT developmental brand while leaving PPG Paints Arena as a future option for NXT TakeOver events.

Ring of Honor has adopted Stage AE as its de facto home in Pittsburgh after previously using various venues in and around the area, including the David L. Lawrence Convention Center across the Allegheny River from the venue and as far away as Belle Vernon, California, Indiana, and Wheeling for shows, using college venues or (in Wheeling's case) WesBanco Arena for shows. ROH has had both live events and tapings for Ring of Honor Wrestling at Stage AE, including the Global Wars 2017 tour with New Japan Pro-Wrestling. (The latter marking NJPW's debut in Pittsburgh.) Local Fox affiliate WPGH-TV and MyNetworkTV affiliate WPNT, who are both owned by ROH parent Sinclair Broadcast Group and the latter the local home of Ring of Honor Wrestling, often serve as a sponsor for ROH at the venue.

== See also ==
- List of contemporary amphitheatres
