= ROH/NJPW War of the Worlds (2018) =

War of the Worlds Tour: A ROH and NJPW Collaboration

War of the Worlds (2018)
- Promotional poster for the tour
- Promotion(s): New Japan Pro-Wrestling; Ring of Honor
- Date: May 9, 11, 12 and 13, 2018
- City: Night 1: Lowell, Massachusetts, U.S. Night 2: Toronto, Ontario, Canada; Night 3: Royal Oak, Michigan, U.S. Night 4: Villa Park, Illinois, U.S.
- Venue: Night 1: Lowell Memorial Auditorium; Night 2: Ted Reeve Arena; Night 3: Royal Oak Music Theatre; Night 4: Odeum Expo Center

Pay-per-view chronology
← Previous; Supercard of Honor XII	Next → Best in the World

War of the Worlds chronology
← Previous; War of the Worlds UK	Next → 2019

War of the Worlds Tour was a professional wrestling tour and livestreaming event that was co-produced by Ring of Honor (ROH) and New Japan Pro-Wrestling (NJPW) and was streamed live on Honor Club.

== Production ==
Other on-screen personnel
Role:	Name:
Commentators	Kevin Kelly
Commentators	Steve Corino
Commentators	Nigel McGuinness
Ring announcers	Bobby Cruise
Referees	Brian Gorie
Referees	Marty Asami
Referees	Paul Turner
Referees	Tiger Hattori
Referees	Todd Sinclair

=== Background ===
In 2014, NJPW and ROH formally forged a relationship, which saw them present the first War of the Worlds show on May 17, 2014, at the Hammerstein Ballroom in New York City, New York. The following year, War of the Worlds was held over two days at the 2300 Arena in Philadelphia, Pennsylvania, and in 2016 it was expanded to a three-show tour with shows taking place in Dearborn, Michigan, Toronto, Ontario, and New York City. The 2017 War of the Worlds tour was held from May 7 to 14. In February 2018, NJPW and ROH announced War of the Worlds Tour, a four-show collaborative tour taking place in Lowell, Massachusetts, Toronto, Ontario, Royal Oak, Michigan, and Villa Park, Illinois.

=== Storylines ===
War of the Worlds Tour will feature professional wrestling matches that involve different wrestlers from pre-existing scripted feuds and storylines. Wrestlers will portray villains, heroes, or less distinguishable characters in the scripted events that will build tension and culminate in a wrestling match or a series of matches.

== Results ==
=== Night 1 ===
No.	Results	Stipulations	Times
1	The Briscoes (Jay Briscoe and Mark Briscoe) defeated Flip Gordon and Jushin Thunder Liger	Tag team match	11:55
2	Tenille Dashwood and Sumie Sakai defeated Deonna Purrazzo and Skylar	Tag team match	7:59
3	Coast 2 Coast (LSG and Shaheem Ali) defeated The Kingdom (T. K. O'Ryan and Vinny Marseglia) (with Matt Taven)	Tag team match	8:36
4	Cheeseburger defeated Bully Ray via countout	Singles match	5:04
5	Bullet Club (Cody, Hangman Page and Marty Scurll) defeated Roppongi 3K (Rocky Romero, Sho and Yoh)	Six-man tag team match	14:37
6	Los Ingobernables de Japón (Tetsuya Naito, Evil and Sanada) defeated Silas Young, Beer City Bruiser and Brian Milonas	Six-man tag team match	9:09
7	Chuckie T. defeated Jay Lethal and Jay White	Three-way match	10:41
8	The Kingdom (Matt Taven, T. K. O'Ryan and Vinny Marseglia) defeated SoCal Uncensored (Christopher Daniels, Frankie Kazarian and Scorpio Sky) (c)	Six-man tag team match for the ROH World Six-Man Tag Team Championship	14:29
9	The Young Bucks (Matt Jackson and Nick Jackson) defeated Los Ingobernables de Japón (Bushi and Hiromu Takahashi)	Tag team match	15:22
(c) / – the champion(s) heading into the match

=== Night 2 ===
No.	Results	Stipulations	Times
1^{D}	The Dawgs (Rhett Titus and Will Ferrara) defeated The Boys (Boy 1 and Boy 2)	Tag team match	5:13
2	Jay White (c) defeated Punishment Martinez	Singles match for the IWGP United States Heavyweight Championship	11:00
3	Cheeseburger defeated Bully Ray by disqualification	Singles match	3:16
4	Tetsuya Naito defeated Beer City Bruiser	Singles match	12:35
5	The Young Bucks (Matt Jackson and Nick Jackson) defeated Super Smash Bros. (Evil Uno and Stu Grayson)	Tag team match	17:26
6	Tenille Dashwood and Jenny Rose defeated Alexia Nicole and Xandra Bale	Tag team match	6:28
7	SoCal Uncensored (Christopher Daniels, Frankie Kazarian and Scorpio Sky) defeated Roppongi 3K (Rocky Romero, Sho and Yoh)	Six-man tag team match	9:15
8	Silas Young (c) defeated Hangman Page	Singles match for the ROH World Television Championship	7:32
9	Cody defeated Jushin Thunder Liger	Singles match	12:06
10	Los Ingobernables de Japón (Evil, Hiromu Takahashi and Sanada) defeated Jay Lethal, Kenny King and Colt Cabana	Six-man tag team match	22:44
(c) / – the champion(s) heading into the match; D / – this was a dark match

=== Night 3 ===
No.	Results	Stipulations
1^{D}	The Dawgs (Rhett Titus and Will Ferrara) defeated Buddy Hanlon and Facade (with Dani)	Tag team match
2	Evil defeated Shane Taylor	Singles match
3	Tenille Dashwood and Jenny Rose defeated Sumie Sakai and Stella Grey	Tag team match
4	Marty Scurll defeated Kenny King, Sanada and Matt Taven	Four corner survival match
5	Roppongi 3K (Sho and Yoh) (with Rocky Romero) defeated The Young Bucks (Matt Jackson and Nick Jackson) and The Motor City Machine Guns (Alex Shelley and Chris Sabin)	Three-way tag team match
6	Silas Young and Beer City Bruiser defeated The Boys (Boy 1 and Boy 2)	Tag team match
7	SoCal Uncensored (Christopher Daniels, Frankie Kazarian and Scorpio Sky) defeated Flip Gordon, Cheeseburger and Jushin Thunder Liger	Six-man tag team match
8	Cody defeated Hiromu Takahashi	Singles match
9	The Briscoes (Jay Briscoe and Mark Briscoe) (c) defeated Los Ingobernables de Japón (Tetsuya Naito and Bushi)	Tag team match for the ROH World Tag Team Championship
(c) / – the champion(s) heading into the match; D / – this was a dark match

=== Night 4 ===
No.	Results	Stipulations	Times
1^{D}	Beer City Bruiser and Brian Milonas defeated One Mean Team (Brian Johnson and Justin Pusser (with Miss Jasmine))	Tag team match	14:03
2^{D}	Stacy Shadows defeated Stella Grey	Singles match	6:50
3	Tenille Dashwood defeated Karen Q	Singles match	10:04
4	Cheeseburger and Jushin Thunder Liger defeated The Dawgs (Rhett Titus and Will Ferrara)	Tag team match	12:26
5	Sumie Sakai (c) defeated Jenny Rose	Singles match for the Women of Honor World Championship	13:47
6	The Briscoes (Jay Briscoe and Mark Briscoe) (c) defeated Roppongi 3K (Sho and Yoh)	Tag team match for the ROH World Tag Team Championship	20:43
7	Silas Young (c) defeated Austin Aries by disqualification	Singles match for the ROH World Television Championship	17:04
8	Kelly Klein defeated Deonna Purrazzo	Singles match	11:12
9	SoCal Uncensored (Christopher Daniels, Frankie Kazarian and Scorpio Sky) defeated The Kingdom (Matt Taven, T. K. O'Ryan and Vinny Marseglia) (c) by disqualification	Six-man tag team match for the ROH World Six-Man Tag Team Championship	15:00
10	Kenny King defeated Chuckie T.	Singles match	17:45
11	Shane Taylor defeated Josh Woods	Singles match	10:04
12	Bullet Club (Cody, Hangman Page, Marty Scurll, and The Young Bucks (Matt Jackson and Nick Jackson)) defeated Los Ingobernables de Japón (Bushi, Evil, Hiromu Takahashi, Sanada, and Tetsuya Naito)	Ten-man tag team match	25:56
(c) / – the champion(s) heading into the match; D / – this was a dark match

== See also ==
- Professional wrestling in Canada
- 2018 in professional wrestling
