= War of the Worlds UK =

2017 professional wrestling show

- Promotional poster for the tour
- Promotion(s): Consejo Mundial de Lucha Libre; New Japan Pro-Wrestling; Revolution Pro Wrestling; Ring of Honor
- Date: August 18, 19, and 20, 2017
- City: Night 1: London, England, U.K. Night 2: Liverpool, England, U.K. Night 3: Edinburgh, Scotland, U.K.

Pay-per-view chronology
| ← Previous; Best in the World | Next → Death Before Dishonor XV |

War of the Worlds chronology
| ← Previous; 2017 | Next → Tour |

New Japan Pro-Wrestling events chronology
| ← Previous; G1 Special in USA; Lion's Gate Project 7; G1 Climax 27 | Next → Destruction in Fukushima |

War of the Worlds UK was a multi-promotional professional wrestling "supershow" tour jointly produced by Mexico's Consejo Mundial de Lucha Libre (CMLL), New Japan Pro-Wrestling (NJPW), the UK based Revolution Pro Wrestling (RPW), and the U.S.-based Ring of Honor (ROH).

The tour's three events took place on August 18 at the York Hall in London, August 19 at the Liverpool Olympia in Liverpool, and August 20 at the Edinburgh Corn Exchange in Edinburgh. The second night in Liverpool aired as a pay-per-view.

== Production ==
Other on-screen personnel
| Role: | Name: |
|---|---|
| Commentators | Kevin Kelly |
| Commentators | Steve Corino |
| Commentators | Nigel McGuinness |
| Ring announcers | Bobby Cruise |
| Referees | Brian Gorie |
| Referees | Marty Asami |
| Referees | Paul Turner |
| Referees | Tiger Hattori |
| Referees | Todd Sinclair |

=== Background ===
In 2014, NJPW and ROH formally forged a relationship, which saw them present the first War of the Worlds show on May 17, 2014, at the Hammerstein Ballroom in New York City, New York. The following year, War of the Worlds was held over two days at the 2300 Arena in Philadelphia, Pennsylvania and in 2016 it was expanded to a three-show tour with shows taking place in Dearborn, Michigan, Toronto, Ontario and New York City. The 2017 War of the Worlds tour was held from May 7 to 14. On May 22, ROH announced a second War of the Worlds tour, this time taking place in the United Kingdom, for which they and NJPW would be joined by Consejo Mundial de Lucha Libre (CMLL) and RPW. The three shows would take place on August 18 in London, August 19 in Liverpool and August 20 in Edinburgh.

=== Storylines ===
The War of the Worlds UK tour featured professional wrestling matches that involved different wrestlers from pre-existing scripted feuds and storylines. Wrestlers portrayed villains, heroes, or less distinguishable characters in the scripted events that built tension and culminated in a wrestling match or series of matches.

On August 9, ROH announced their sole World Championship match of the tour, which pitted defending champion and Bullet Club member Cody against Los Ingobernables de Japón member Sanada.

== Results ==
=== Night 1 ===
| No. | Results | Stipulations |
|---|---|---|
| 1 | Mark Briscoe defeated Ryan Smile | Singles match |
| 2 | The Addiction (Christopher Daniels and Frankie Kazarian) defeated Rey Bucanero and Último Guerrero | Tag team match |
| 3 | Jay Briscoe defeated Kenny King | Singles match |
| 4 | Bully Ray defeated Jay Lethal, Sha Samuels, and Silas Young | Four Corner Survival match |
| 5 | Dalton Castle and The Boys (Boy 1 and Boy 2) (c) defeated Delirious, Jushin Thunder Liger, and Místico | Six-man tag team match for the ROH World Six-Man Tag Team Championship |
| 6 | Kushida (c) defeated Titán | Singles match for the ROH World Television Championship |
| 7 | Los Ingobernables de Japón (Bushi, Evil, Hiromu Takahashi, Sanada, and Tetsuya Naito) defeated Bullet Club (Cody, Hangman Page, Marty Scurll, and The Young Bucks (Matt Jackson & Nick Jackson)) | Ten-man tag team match |
(c) / – the champion(s) heading into the match

=== Night 2 ===
| No. | Results | Stipulations |
|---|---|---|
| 1 | CCK (Chris Brookes and Travis Banks) defeated The Boys (Boy 1 and Boy 2) | Tag team match |
| 2 | Kenny King defeated Hangman Page | Singles match |
| 3 | Rey Bucanero and Último Guerrero defeated Místico and Titán | Tag team match |
| 4 | Jay Lethal defeated Josh Bodom | Singles match |
| 5 | Bully Ray and The Briscoe Brothers (Jay Briscoe and Mark Briscoe) defeated Los Ingobernables de Japón (Bushi, Evil, and Tetsuya Naito) | Six-man tag team match |
| 6 | Mark Haskins defeated Silas Young | Singles match |
| 7 | Kushida (c) defeated Dalton Castle, Hiromu Takahashi, and Marty Scurll | Four Corner Survival match for the ROH World Television Championship |
| 8 | The Young Bucks (Matt Jackson and Nick Jackson) (c) defeated The Addiction (Christopher Daniels and Frankie Kazarian) | Tag team match for the ROH World Tag Team Championship |
| 9 | Cody (c) defeated Sanada | Singles match for the ROH World Championship |
(c) / – the champion(s) heading into the match

=== Night 3 ===
| No. | Results | Stipulations |
|---|---|---|
| 1 | Kenny King defeated Colt Cabana and Josh Bodom | Three-way match |
| 2 | The Briscoe Brothers (Jay Briscoe and Mark Briscoe) defeated Rey Bucanero and Último Guerrero | Tag team match |
| 3 | Bully Ray defeated Evil | Singles match |
| 4 | Los Ingobernables de Japón (Bushi, Sanada, and Tetsuya Naito) defeated Kushida, Mistico, and Titán | Six-man tag team match |
| 5 | Hiromu Takahashi defeated Mark Haskins | Singles match |
| 6 | The Hung Bucks (Hangman Page and The Young Bucks (Matt Jackson & Nick Jackson)) defeated Dalton Castle and (Boy 1 and Boy 2) (c) | Six-man tag team match for the ROH World Six-Man Tag Team Championship |
| 7 | Bullet Club (Cody and Marty Scurll) defeated The Addiction (Christopher Daniels and Frankie Kazarian) | Tag team match |
| 8 | Silas Young defeated Jay Lethal | Street fight |
(c) / – the champion(s) heading into the match

== See also ==
- Professional wrestling in the United Kingdom
- Professional wrestling promotions in the United Kingdom
