= ROH/NJPW War of the Worlds (2017) =

Professional wrestling event

War of the Worlds (2017)
- Promotional poster for the New York City show
- Promotion(s): New Japan Pro-Wrestling; Ring of Honor
- Date: May 7, 10, 12 and 14, 2017
- City: Night 1: Toronto, Ontario, Canada; Night 2: Dearborn, Michigan, U.S. Night 3: New York City, New York, U.S. Night 4: Philadelphia, Pennsylvania, U.S.
- Venue: Night 1: Ted Reeve Arena; Night 2: Ford Community & Performing Arts Center; Night 3: Hammerstein Ballroom; Night 4: 2300 Arena
- Attendance: Night 1: 1,500; Night 2: 1,000; Night 3: 1,800; Night 4: 1,100

Pay-per-view chronology
← Previous; Supercard of Honor XI	Next → Best in the World

War of the Worlds chronology
← Previous; 2016	Next → UK

New Japan Pro-Wrestling events chronology
← Previous; Wrestling Dontaku 2017; Lion's Gate Project 5	Next → Dominion 6.11 in Osaka-jo Hall

War of the Worlds (2017) was a professional wrestling tour co-produced by the American Ring of Honor (ROH) and Japanese New Japan Pro-Wrestling (NJPW) promotions.

The tour's four events took place on May 7 at the Ted Reeve Arena in Toronto, Ontario; May 10 at the Ford Community & Performing Arts Center in Dearborn, Michigan; May 12 at the Hammerstein Ballroom in New York City; and May 14 at the 2300 Arena in Philadelphia, Pennsylvania.

The third night aired live on pay-per-view (PPV), while the fourth night was taped for four future episodes, including the 300th overall episode, of ROH's weekly television program, Ring of Honor Wrestling. 2017 was the fourth year in which ROH and NJPW co-produced events under the War of the Worlds name. During the third night of the tour, NJPW announced the creation of the IWGP United States Heavyweight Championship.

== Production ==
=== Background ===
In 2014, Japanese promotion New Japan Pro-Wrestling (NJPW) and Ring of Honor (ROH) formally forged a relationship, which saw them present the first War of the Worlds show on May 17, 2014, at the Hammerstein Ballroom in New York City, New York. The following year, War of the Worlds was held over two days at the 2300 Arena in Philadelphia, Pennsylvania and in 2016 it was expanded to a three-show tour with shows taking place in Dearborn, Michigan, Toronto, Ontario and New York City. The 2017 War of the Worlds tour was officially announced in January 2017, when ROH put tickets on sale for the events. At that point, ROH announced a three-show tour with events taking place on May 7 in Toronto, May 10 in Dearborn and May 14 in Philadelphia with rumors of a fourth show to be added later. The fourth show, taking place on May 12 in New York City, was officially added to the tour in March. It was also announced that the show would air on pay-per-view (PPV) as well as the FITE TV application, PlayStation Network and ROHWrestling.com. In Japan, the show would also air live on NJPW's internet streaming site, NJPW World. These would mark the fourth annual shows co-promoted by NJPW and ROH.

ROH began announcing the NJPW wrestlers for the tour on April 17, starting with IWGP Intercontinental Champion Tetsuya Naito and Kushida. ROH wrestlers announced for the tour included ROH World Champion Christopher Daniels, ROH World Television Champion Marty Scurll, ROH World Six-Man Tag Team Champions Bully Ray and The Briscoes (Jay Briscoe and Mark Briscoe), Dalton Castle and Jay Lethal in addition to ROH World Tag Team Champions The Young Bucks (Matt Jackson and Nick Jackson), Cody and Will Ospreay, who work for both NJPW and ROH. Over the following days, ROH continued announcing additional NJPW wrestlers for the tour, including Hirooki Goto, the Los Ingobernables de Japón trio of Bushi, Evil and Sanada Gedo, and Hiroshi Tanahashi. Also announced was Kenny Omega, who would, however, only work the Toronto show.

=== Storylines ===
The War of the Worlds tour featured professional wrestling matches that involved different wrestlers from pre-existing scripted feuds and storylines. Wrestlers portrayed villains, heroes, or less distinguishable characters in the scripted events that built tension and culminated in a wrestling match or series of matches.

On April 14, ROH announced the first match for the tour, which would see Christopher Daniels defend the ROH World Championship against Matt Taven on May 10. Taven earned a title shot by winning the Honor Royale on March 4, announcing shortly thereafter his intention of challenging Daniels on the War of the Worlds tour. Daniels and Taven had a history involving the ROH World Tag Team Championship with Taven and Michael Bennett winning the title from Daniels and Frankie Kazarian in 2015. The Dearborn show would also feature a match for the ROH World Six-Man Tag Team Championship with defending champions, Bully Ray and The Briscoes, defending against NJPW's reigning NEVER Openweight 6-Man Tag Team Champions Los Ingobernables de Japón (Bushi, Evil and Sanada).

The May 12 show would be main evented by the ROH World Championship being contested in a three-way match with Daniels defending against Cody and Jay Lethal. Cody's challenge had been accepted by Daniels prior to the match with Taven, while Lethal earned a spot in the match on April 8 by winning a four-way match, also involving Hangman Page, Jay White and Silas Young. Cody and Lethal had been feuding with each other in the months prior to War of the Worlds with Lethal defeating Cody in a Texas bullrope match at Supercard of Honor XI. Other title matches would include Marty Scurll defending the ROH World Television Championship against Matt Sydal and Bully Ray and The Briscoes defending the ROH World Six-Man Tag Team Championship against the Chaos trio of Beretta, Hirooki Goto and Rocky Romero.

The tour concluding Philadelphia show would be headlined by a Philadelphia Street Fight between Adam Cole and Marty Scurll. Cole's ROH contract had expired on May 1 and it was reported that the Philadelphia show would be his final scheduled appearance for the promotion. ROH set up the storyline behind the match at the New York City show, where the Bullet Club stable turned on Cole and replaced him with Scurll. Earlier in the Philadelphia show, Cole cost Scurll the ROH World Television Championship in his match against Kushida, leading to the main event street fight. Instead of being taped for Ring of Honor Wrestling, the main event was taped to be released later on ROH's official website.

== Aftermath ==
On May 22, 2017, ROH announced a second War of the Worlds tour, entitled War of the Worlds UK, this time taking place in the United Kingdom, for which ROH and NJPW were joined by the Mexican Consejo Mundial de Lucha Libre (CMLL) and the British Revolution Pro Wrestling (RPW) promotions. The three shows take place on August 18 in London, August 19 in Liverpool and August 20 in Edinburgh.

== Results ==
=== Night 1 ===
No.	Results	Stipulations
1^{D}	Cheeseburger and Will Ferrara defeated The Fraternity (Channing Decker and Trent Gibson)	Tag team match
2	The Rebellion (Caprice Coleman and Rhett Titus) defeated The Motor City Machine Guns (Alex Shelley and Chris Sabin)	Tag team match
3	Hirooki Goto defeated Shane Taylor	Singles match
4	Dalton Castle and The Boys (Boy 1 and Boy 2) defeated Chaos (Beretta, Gedo and Rocky Romero)	Six-man tag team match
5	Bully Ray defeated Hangman Page and Punishment Martinez	Three-way match
6	Cody defeated Will Ospreay	Singles match
7	Los Ingobernables de Japón (Bushi and Tetsuya Naito) defeated The Kingdom (Matt Taven and Vinny Marseglia)	Tag team match
8	The Briscoes (Jay Briscoe and Mark Briscoe) defeated Beer City Bruiser and Silas Young and Los Ingobernables de Japón (Evil and Sanada)	Three-way tag team match
9	Kushida defeated Jay Lethal	Singles match
10	The Elite (Kenny Omega, Matt Jackson and Nick Jackson) defeated The Addiction (Christopher Daniels and Frankie Kazarian) and Hiroshi Tanahashi	Six-man tag team match
D / – this was a dark match

=== Night 2 ===
No.	Results	Stipulations
1^{D}	Kelly Klein defeated Jynx	Singles match
2	Dalton Castle (with The Boys) defeated Bobby Fish	Singles match
3	Search and Destroy (Alex Shelley, Chris Sabin and Jay White) defeated The Rebellion (Caprice Coleman, Rhett Titus and Shane Taylor)	Six-man tag team match
4	Silas Young defeated Kushida	Singles match
5	War Machine (Hanson and Raymond Rowe) defeated Hiroshi Tanahashi and Jay Lethal	Tag team match
6	The Briscoes (Jay Briscoe and Mark Briscoe) and Bully Ray (c) defeated Los Ingobernables de Japón (Bushi, Evil and Sanada)	No disqualification six-man tag team match for the ROH World Six-Man Tag Team Championship
7	Tetsuya Naito defeated Punishment Martinez	Singles match
8	Cheeseburger defeated Beer City Bruiser, Frankie Kazarian, Gedo, Marty Scurll, Vinny Marseglia and Will Ferrara	"Proving Ground Instant Reward" seven-way match; the winner, if not Scurll, would earn an immediate shot at the ROH World Television Championship
9	Marty Scurll (c) defeated Cheeseburger (with Will Ferrara)	Singles match for the ROH World Television Championship
10	Christopher Daniels (c) defeated Matt Taven	Singles match for the ROH World Championship
11	Chaos (Beretta, Hirooki Goto, Rocky Romero and Will Ospreay) defeated Bullet Club (Cody, Hangman Page, Matt Jackson and Nick Jackson)	Eight-man tag team match
(c) / – the champion(s) heading into the match; D / – this was a dark match

=== Night 3 ===
No.	Results	Stipulations	Times
1^{D}	The Kingdom (Matt Taven and Vinny Marseglia) (with T. K. O'Ryan) defeated The Tempura Boyz (Sho and Yo)	Tag team match	—
2^{D}	The Rebellion (Kenny King, Rhett Titus and Shane Taylor) (with Caprice Coleman) defeated Cheeseburger, Gedo and Will Ferrara	Six-man tag team match	—
3	Dalton Castle (with The Boys) defeated Bobby Fish, Kushida and Silas Young (with Beer City Bruiser)	Four-way match	07:48
4	Hangman Page defeated Frankie Kazarian	Singles match	04:43
5	War Machine (Hanson and Raymond Rowe) defeated Los Ingobernables de Japón (Evil and Sanada) and Search and Destroy (Chris Sabin and Jonathan Gresham) (with Alex Shelley)	Three-way tag team match	08:47
6	Will Ospreay defeated Jay White	Singles match	13:11
7	The Briscoes (Jay Briscoe and Mark Briscoe) and Bully Ray (c) defeated Chaos (Beretta, Hirooki Goto and Rocky Romero)	No disqualification six-man tag team match for the ROH World Six-Man Tag Team Championship	12:45
8	Marty Scurll (c) defeated Matt Sydal	Singles match for the ROH World Television Championship	11:24
9	The Young Bucks (Matt Jackson and Nick Jackson) (c) defeated Los Ingobernables de Japón (Bushi and Tetsuya Naito)	Tag team match for the ROH World Tag Team Championship	13:35
10	Hiroshi Tanahashi defeated Adam Cole	Singles match	13:32
11	Christopher Daniels (c) defeated Cody and Jay Lethal	Three-way match for the ROH World Championship	13:31
(c) / – the champion(s) heading into the match; D / – this was a dark match

=== Night 4 (TV Tapings) ===
No.	Results	Stipulations
1^{D}	The Tempura Boyz (Sho and Yo) defeated Coast 2 Coast (LSG and Shaheem Ali)	Tag team match
2	Josh Woods defeated David Starr	Singles match
3	Jay Lethal defeated Beer City Bruiser (with Silas Young) by disqualification	Singles match
4	Cody defeated Frankie Kazarian	Singles match
5^{D}	Gabby Ortiz and Sumie Sakai defeated Bonesaw Jessie Brooks and Tasha Steelz	Tag team match
6	War Machine (Hanson and Raymond Rowe) defeated Cheeseburger and Will Ferrara	Tag team match
7	Los Ingobernables de Japón (Bushi, Evil, Sanada and Tetsuya Naito) defeated The Briscoes (Jay Briscoe and Mark Briscoe), Bully Ray and Dalton Castle (with The Boys)	Eight-man tag team match
8	Hangman Page defeated Adam Cole	Singles match
9^{D}	Kelly Klein defeated Jenny Rose	Singles match
10	Chuck Taylor and Roppongi Vice (Beretta and Rocky Romero) defeated Bullet Club (Hangman Page, Matt Jackson and Nick Jackson)	Six-man tag team match
11	The Rebellion (Rhett Titus and Shane Taylor) (with Caprice Coleman) vs. Search and Destroy (Jay White and Jonathan Gresham) (with Alex Shelley) ended in a no contest	Tag team match
12	Kushida defeated Marty Scurll (c)	Singles match for the ROH World Television Championship
13	Beer City Bruiser and Silas Young defeated Bobby Fish and Jay Lethal	Tag team match
14	The Kingdom (Matt Taven and Vinny Marseglia) defeated The Boys (Boy 1 and Boy 2)	Tag team match
15	Punishment Martinez defeated Joey Daddiego	Singles match
16	The Addiction (Christopher Daniels and Frankie Kazarian) and Hiroshi Tanahashi defeated Chaos (Gedo, Hirooki Goto and Will Ospreay)	Six-man tag team match
17^{D}	Marty Scurll defeated Adam Cole	Philadelphia Street Fight
(c) / – the champion(s) heading into the match; D / – this was a dark match

== See also ==
- Professional wrestling in Canada
