= ROH/NJPW War of the Worlds (2019) =

2019 Ring of Honor tour

War of the Worlds (2019)
- Promotion(s): New Japan Pro-Wrestling; Ring of Honor
- Date: May 8, 9, 11 and 12, 2019
- City: Night 1: Buffalo, New York; Night 2: Toronto, Ontario, Canada; Night 3: Grand Rapids, Michigan; Night 4: Villa Park, Illinois, U.S. (live broadcast and TV taping)
- Venue: Night 1: Buffalo RiverWorks; Night 2: Ted Reeve Arena; Night 3: DeltaPlex Arena; Night 4: Odeum Expo Center

Pay-per-view chronology
← Previous; Crockett Cup	Next → State of the Art

War of the Worlds chronology
← Previous; 2018	Next → —

New Japan Pro-Wrestling events chronology
← Previous; Wrestling Dontaku 2019	Next → Dominion 6.9 in Osaka-jo Hall

War of the Worlds (2019) was a four city, four event professional wrestling tour and livestreaming event co-produced by the American Ring of Honor (ROH) and Japanese New Japan Pro-Wrestling (NJPW) promotions.

The cards took place on May 8, 2019 at Buffalo RiverWorks in Buffalo, New York, May 9 at the Ted Reeve Arena in Toronto, Ontario, May 11 at the DeltaPlex Arena in Grand Rapids, Michigan, and May 12 at the Odeum Expo Center in Villa Park, Illinois. The first three nights streamed live on Honor Club and FITE TV, while the fourth night, while livestreamed, was taped for four future episodes, including the 400th overall episode, of ROH's weekly television program, Ring of Honor Wrestling.

== Production ==
Other on-screen personnel
Role:	Name:
Commentators	Kevin Kelly
Commentators	Steve Corino
Commentators	Nigel McGuinness
Ring announcers	Bobby Cruise
Referees	Brian Gorie
Referees	Marty Asami
Referees	Paul Turner
Referees	Tiger Hattori
Referees	Todd Sinclair

=== Storylines ===
ROH/NJPW War of the Worlds will feature professional wrestling matches that involve different wrestlers from pre-existing scripted feuds and storylines. Wrestlers will portray villains, heroes, or less distinguishable characters in the scripted events that will build tension and culminate in a wrestling match or a series of matches.

During a tag team match between The Kingdom and Villain Enterprises PCO and Brody King, PCO pinned current ROH World Champion Matt Taven. The following week on the Ring of Honor television taping, it was announced that Matt Taven would defend his title against PCO, which was made official.

At G1 Supercard, the Guerillas of Destiny won a winner takes all match for both the ROH Tag Team Championship and the IWGP Tag Team Championship on the line. At Masters of the Craft, Jay Lethal and Jonathan Gresham won a 30-minute Iron Man Match against Lifeblood Mark Haskins and Tracy Williams 2–1 to earn an opportunity against the Guerillas of Destiny. A week later during the ROH television tapings, the match was made official.

== Results ==
=== Night 1: Buffalo ===
No.	Results	Stipulations
1	P. J. Black defeated Alex Coughlin	Singles match
2	Kelly Klein (c) defeated Kate Carney	Singles match for the Women of Honor World Championship
3	The Kingdom (T. K. O'Ryan and Vinny Marseglia) defeated Karl Fredericks & Clark Connors	Tag team match
4	Shane Taylor defeated HIKULEO	Singles match
5	Los Ingobernables de Japón (Evil and Sanada) defeated Lifeblood (Mark Haskins and Tracy Williams)	Tag team match
6	Rush defeated Silas Young	Singles match
7	Villain Enterprises (Brody King, Marty Scurll and PCO) (c) defeated Yuji Nagata, Satoshi Kojima and Jeff Cobb	Six-man tag team match for the ROH World Six-Man Tag Team Championship
8	Guerrillas of Destiny (Tama Tonga and Tanga Loa) (c) defeated Jay Lethal and Jonathan Gresham	Tag team match for the ROH World Tag Team Championship
9	Flip Gordon defeated Bandido	Singles match
(c) / – the champion(s) heading into the match

=== Night 2: Toronto ===
No.	Results	Stipulations
1	Bullet Club (Tama Tonga, Tanga Loa, HIKULEO) defeated Karl Fredericks, Alex Coughlin and Clark Connors	Six-man tag team match
2	Yuji Nagata defeated Silas Young by disqualification	Singles match
3	Los Ingobernables de Japón (Evil and Sanada) defeated The Kingdom (T. K. O'Ryan and Vinny Marseglia)	Tag team match
4	Rush defeated P. J. Black	Singles match
5	The Briscoes (Jay Briscoe and Mark Briscoe) defeated Lifeblood (Mark Haskins and Tracy Williams)	Tag team match
6	Jay Lethal defeated Satoshi Kojima	Singles match
7	Shane Taylor defeated Jeff Cobb (c), Hirooki Goto, and Brody King	Four Corner Survival match for the ROH World Television Championship
8	Matt Taven (c) defeated PCO	Singles match for the ROH World Championship
(c) / – the champion(s) heading into the match

=== Night 3: Grand Rapids ===
No.	Results	Stipulations
1	Coast 2 Coast (LSG & Shaheem Ali) defeated Alex Coughlin and Karl Fredericks	Tag team match
2	Kelly Klein (c) defeated Stacy Shadows	Singles match for the Women of Honor World Championship
3	Dalton Castle defeated Cheeseburger and Clark Connors	Three-way match
4	The Kingdom (Matt Taven, T. K. O'Ryan and Vinny Marseglia) defeated Guerrillas of Destiny (Tama Tonga and Tanga Loa) and HIKULEO	Six-man tag team match
5	Flip Gordon defeated Rhett Titus	Singles match
6	Los Ingobernables de Japón (Evil and Sanada) defeated The Bouncers	Tag team match
7	Tracy Williams defeated Rush, Eli Isom and P. J. Black	Four Corner Survival match
8	Matt Taven (c) defeated Mark Haskins	Singles match for the ROH World Championship
9	Jay Lethal, Hirooki Goto, Yuji Nagata, Jeff Cobb and Satoshi Kojima defeated The Briscoes (Jay Briscoe and Mark Briscoe), Bully Ray, Shane Taylor and Silas Young	Ten-man tag team match
(c) / – the champion(s) heading into the match

=== Night 4: Chicago (TV Tapings) ===
No.	Results	Stipulations
1	Flip Gordon defeated Karl Fredericks	Singles match
2	Kenny King defeated Jay Lethal	Singles match
3	The Bouncers (Brian Milonas & The Beer City Bruiser) defeated Alex Coughlin & Clark Connors, Coast 2 Coast (LSG & Shaheem Ali), and The Kingdom (T. K. O'Ryan & Vinny Marseglia)	Four Corner Survival Tag team match
4	Los Ingobernables de Japón (EVIL & SANADA) defeated Satoshi Kojima & Yuji Nagata	Tag Team match
5	Guerrillas of Destiny (Tama Tonga & Tanga Loa) (c) defeated The Briscoes (Jay Briscoe & Mark Briscoe)	Tag team match for the ROH World Tag Team Championship
6	Allysin Kay (c) defeated Marti Belle	Singles match for the NWA Women's Championship
7	Bully Ray & Shane Taylor defeated Lifeblood (Mark Haskins & Tracy Williams)	Tag Team match
8	Colt Cabana (c) vs. James Storm ended in no contest	Singles match for the NWA National Championship
9	Hirooki Goto defeated HIKULEO	Singles match
10	Lifeblood (Mark Haskins & Tracy Williams) & P. J. Black defeated Shinobi Shadow Squad (Cheeseburger, Eli Isom & Ryan Nova)	Six Man Tag Team match
11	Jeff Cobb defeated Jay Lethal, PCO and Rush	Four Corner Survival match to determine the #1 contender for the ROH World Championship
(c) / – the champion(s) heading into the match
