= ROH/NJPW War of the Worlds =

War of the Worlds
- Promotions: Ring of Honor; New Japan Pro-Wrestling
- First event: War of the Worlds (2014)
- Last event: War of the Worlds (2019)

The War of the Worlds was a series of professional wrestling events, produced every year since 2014 by professional wrestling promotions Ring of Honor (ROH) and New Japan Pro-Wrestling (NJPW). The War of the Worlds events are shown on the online streaming services of both promotions, Honor Club and NJPW World.

== History ==
The two promotions announced a partnership in February 2014, which led to the first War of the Worlds event taking place at the Hammerstein Ballroom, in New York City, the following May. The event then became a series of events, with two in 2015, three in 2016, and four since 2017. The events have visited numerous cities and metropolitan areas around the U.S. and Canada, such as New York City, Philadelphia, Detroit, Toronto, Boston and Chicago.

In 2017, as a one-off, ROH and NJPW partnered with Revolution Pro Wrestling (RPW) and Consejo Mundial de Lucha Libre (CMLL) to promote a War of the Worlds tour in the United Kingdom, named War of the Worlds UK.

== Dates and venues ==
	Event	Date	City	Venue	Main event	Ref
1	War of the Worlds (2014)	May 17, 2014	New York City, New York	Hammerstein Ballroom	AJ Styles (c) vs. Michael Elgin vs. Kazuchika Okada in a three-way match for the IWGP Heavyweight Championship	
2	War of the Worlds (2015)	May 12, 2015	Philadelphia, Pennsylvania	2300 Arena	The Briscoes (Jay Briscoe and Mark Briscoe) vs. Chaos (Kazuchika Okada and Shinsuke Nakamura)	
3	War of the Worlds (2015)	May 13, 2015	Philadelphia, Pennsylvania	2300 Arena	Bullet Club (AJ Styles, Matt Jackson and Nick Jackson) vs. The Kingdom (Adam Cole, Matt Taven and Michael Bennett)	
4	War of the Worlds (2016)	May 9, 2016	Dearborn, Michigan	Ford Community & Performing Arts Center	Adam Page, The Motor City Machine Guns (Alex Shelley and Chris Sabin) and The Briscoes (Jay Briscoe and Mark Briscoe) vs. Bullet Club (Adam Cole, Tama Tonga, Tanga Loa, Matt Jackson and Nick Jackson)	
5	War of the Worlds (2016)	May 11, 2016	Toronto, Ontario, Canada	Ted Reeve Arena	Jay Lethal, Roderick Strong and The Briscoes (Jay Briscoe and Mark Briscoe) vs. Bullet Club (Kenny Omega, Matt Jackson, Tama Tonga and Tanga Loa)	
6	War of the Worlds (2016)	May 14, 2016	New York City, New York	Terminal 5	Jay Lethal and Roderick Strong vs. Chaos (Kazuchika Okada and Tomohiro Ishii) vs. Bullet Club (Adam Cole and Matt Jackson) in a three-way tag team match	
7	War of the Worlds (2017)	May 7, 2017	Toronto, Ontario, Canada	Ted Reeve Arena	Hiroshi Tanahashi and The Addiction (Christopher Daniels and Frankie Kazarian) vs. The Elite (Kenny Omega, Matt Jackson and Nick Jackson)	
8	War of the Worlds (2017)	May 10, 2017	Dearborn, Michigan	Ford Community & Performing Arts Center	Chaos (Beretta, Hirooki Goto, Rocky Romero and Will Ospreay) vs. Bullet Club (Cody, Hangman Page, Matt Jackson and Nick Jackson)	
9	War of the Worlds (2017)	May 12, 2017	New York City, New York	Hammerstein Ballroom	Christopher Daniels (c) vs. Jay Lethal vs. Cody in a three-way match for the ROH World Championship	
10	War of the Worlds (2017)	May 14, 2017	Philadelphia, Pennsylvania	2300 Arena	Marty Scurll vs. Adam Cole in a Philadelphia Street Fight	
11	War of the Worlds UK	August 18, 2017	London, England	York Hall	Bullet Club (Cody, Hangman Page, Marty Scurll, Matt Jackson and Nick Jackson) vs. Los Ingobernables de Japón (Bushi, Evil, Hiromu Takahashi, Sanada and Tetsuya Naito)	
12	War of the Worlds UK	August 19, 2017	Liverpool, England	Liverpool Olympia	Cody (c) vs. Sanada for the ROH World Championship	
13	War of the Worlds UK	August 20, 2017	Edinburgh, Scotland	Edinburgh Corn Exchange	Jay Lethal vs. Silas Young in an Edinburgh Street Fight	
14	War of the Worlds Tour	May 9, 2018	Lowell, Massachusetts	Lowell Memorial Auditorium	The Young Bucks (Matt Jackson and Nick Jackson) vs. Los Ingobernables de Japón (Bushi and Hiromu Takahashi)	
15	War of the Worlds Tour	May 11, 2018	Toronto, Ontario, Canada	Ted Reeve Arena	Colt Cabana, Jay Lethal and Kenny King vs. Los Ingobernables de Japón (Evil, Hiromu Takahashi and Sanada)	
16	War of the Worlds Tour	May 12, 2018	Royal Oak, Michigan	Royal Oak Music Theatre	The Briscoes (Jay Briscoe and Mark Briscoe) (c) vs. Los Ingobernables de Japón (Bushi and Tetsuya Naito)	
17	War of the Worlds Tour	May 13, 2018	Villa Park, Illinois	Odeum Expo Center	Bullet Club (Cody, Hangman Page, Marty Scurll, Matt Jackson and Nick Jackson) vs. Los Ingobernables de Japón (Bushi, Evil, Hiromu Takahashi, Sanada and Tetsuya Naito)	
18	War of the Worlds (2019)	May 8, 2019	Buffalo, New York	Buffalo RiverWorks	Bandido vs. Flip Gordon	
19	War of the Worlds (2019)	May 9, 2019	Toronto, Ontario, Canada	Ted Reeve Arena	Matt Taven (c) vs. PCO for the ROH World Championship	
20	War of the Worlds (2019)	May 11, 2019	Grand Rapids, Michigan	The DeltaPlex	Bully Ray, Shane Taylor, Silas Young and The Briscoes (Jay Briscoe and Mark Briscoe) vs. Hirooki Goto, Jay Lethal, Jeff Cobb, Satoshi Kojima and Yuji Nagata	
21	War of the Worlds (2019)	May 12, 2019	Villa Park, Illinois	Odeum Expo Center	Jay Lethal vs. PCO vs. Rush vs. Jeff Cobb in a Four Corner Survival match	
(c) – refers to the champion(s) heading into the match

== See also ==
- Global Wars
- Global Wars UK
- Honor Rising: Japan
- G1 Special in USA
