= ROH/NJPW War of the Worlds (2016) =

Wrestling tour

War of the Worlds (2016)
- Promotional poster for the Dearborn show
- Promotion(s): New Japan Pro-Wrestling; Ring of Honor
- Date: May 9, 11, and 14, 2016
- City: Night 1: Dearborn, Michigan, U.S. Night 2: Toronto, Ontario, Canada; Night 3: New York City, New York, U.S.
- Venue: Night 1: Ford Community & Performing Arts Center; Night 2: Ted Reeve Arena; Night 3: Terminal 5
- Attendance: Night 1: 1,200; Night 2: 1,500; Night 3: 1,200

Event chronology
← Previous; Global Wars	Next → (NJPW) Lion's Gate Project 2 / (ROH) Road to BITW

War of the Worlds chronology
← Previous; 2015	Next → 2017

War of the Worlds (2016) was a professional wrestling tour co-produced by the American Ring of Honor (ROH) and Japanese New Japan Pro-Wrestling (NJPW) promotions in 2016. It was the third year in which ROH and NJPW co-produced events under the War of the Worlds name.

The tour's three events took place on May 9 at the Ford Community & Performing Arts Center in Dearborn, Michigan, May 11 at the Ted Reeve Arena in Toronto, Ontario, and May 14 at Terminal 5 in New York City, New York. The second night in Toronto was taped for four episodes of Ring of Honor Wrestling.

== Production ==
Other on-screen personnel
Role:	Name:
Commentators	Kevin Kelly
Commentators	Steve Corino
Commentators	Nigel McGuinness
Ring announcers	Bobby Cruise
Referees	Brian Gorie
Referees	Marty Asami
Referees	Paul Turner
Referees	Tiger Hattori
Referees	Todd Sinclair

=== Background ===
In February 2014, the American Ring of Honor (ROH) promotion announced a partnership with the Japanese New Japan Pro-Wrestling (NJPW) promotion, which led to the two co-producing the Global Wars and War of the Worlds events in Toronto and New York City, respectively, the following May. A year later, the partnership continued with War of the Worlds '15 and Global Wars '15, which were both two-day events, taking place in Philadelphia and Toronto, respectively. On August 21, 2015, representatives of NJPW and ROH declared that the relationship between the two promotions was stronger than ever, announcing another North American tour for May 2016, featuring new locations and wrestlers, as well as the first co-produced shows between the two promotions in Tokyo. The two-day event, entitled Honor Rising: Japan 2016, took place on February 19 and 20, 2016.

On February 4, 2016, ROH officially announced the War of the Worlds tour, taking place on May 9 in Dearborn, Michigan, May 11 in Toronto and May 14 in New York City. On April 16, ROH announced the NJPW wrestlers taking part in the tour; IWGP Heavyweight Champion Tetsuya Naito, ROH World Television Champion Tomohiro Ishii, IWGP Junior Heavyweight Champion Kushida, Gedo, Hiroshi Tanahashi, Jyushin Thunder Liger and Kazuchika Okada. On April 18, ROH added NJPW's IWGP Tag Team Champions Guerrillas of Destiny (Tama Tonga and Tanga Loa)^{†} to the tour. ROH later added IWGP Intercontinental Champion Kenny Omega to the Toronto event of the tour. It had previously been reported that Omega had had issues with his visa, which could prevent him from taking part in the rest of the tour. On May 6, NJPW officially added Yoshitatsu to the Toronto event. Jyushin Thunder Liger was pulled from the Dearborn event after being dropped on his head during the May 8 Global Wars event. Nick Jackson suffered a rib injury during his first match at the Toronto event and was pulled from his second match as well as the New York City event. Meanwhile, Tetsuya Naito was hospitalized during the tour with high fever, but did not miss any shows. Others suffering minor injuries during the tour included Hiroshi Tanahashi and Matt Jackson.

=== Storylines ===
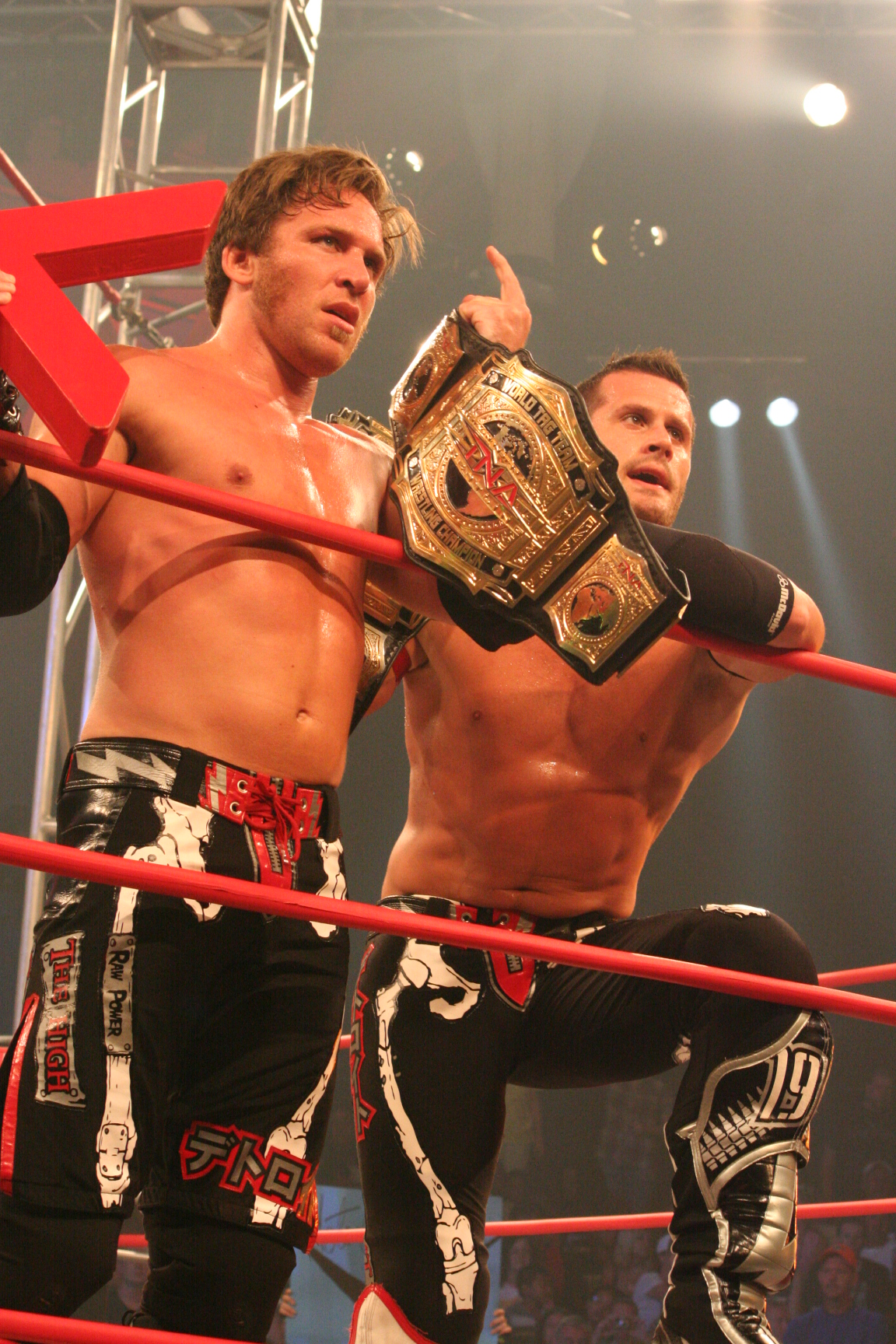
Chris Sabin and Alex Shelley, The Motor City Machine Guns, who main evented the Dearborn show

The War of the Worlds tour featured professional wrestling matches that involved different wrestlers from pre-existing scripted feuds and storylines. Wrestlers portrayed villains, heroes, or less distinguishable characters in the scripted events that built tension and culminated in a wrestling match or series of matches.

The May 9 Dearborn event was advertised as being headlined by a tag team match between The Briscoes (Jay Briscoe and Mark Briscoe) and The Motor City Machine Guns (Alex Shelley and Chris Sabin). Shelley and Sabin reunited at ROH's 14th Anniversary Show in February and have since wrestled regularly in ROH's tag team division. The Briscoes, meanwhile, had recently become the number one contenders to the ROH World Tag Team Championship. Even though ROH billed this as the "very first time" the two teams would face each other in a two-on-two match, the two teams had actually met in April 2007, when Shelley and Sabin unsuccessfully challenged The Briscoes for the ROH World Tag Team Championship. Both teams have a championship history in NJPW with Shelley and Sabin winning the IWGP Junior Heavyweight Championship in 2009, and The Briscoes becoming two-time NEVER Openweight 6-Man Tag Team Champions earlier in the year. Following the events of Global Wars, the main event was changed with The Briscoes and The Motor City Machine Guns coming together with Adam Page to take on the Bullet Club stable in a ten-man tag team match. Another top match in Dearborn would see IWGP Heavyweight Champion Tetsuya Naito team up with ROH World Champion Jay Lethal to take on reDRagon (Bobby Fish and Kyle O'Reilly). The partnership between Naito and Lethal was formed during February's Honor Rising: Japan 2016 event, where Naito's Los Ingobernables de Japón (L.I.J.) stable helped Lethal retain the ROH World Championship against Tomoaki Honma. Afterwards, Lethal and his then manager Truth Martini joined L.I.J. reDRagon also has a history in NJPW, where they are former two-time IWGP Junior Heavyweight Tag Team Champions.

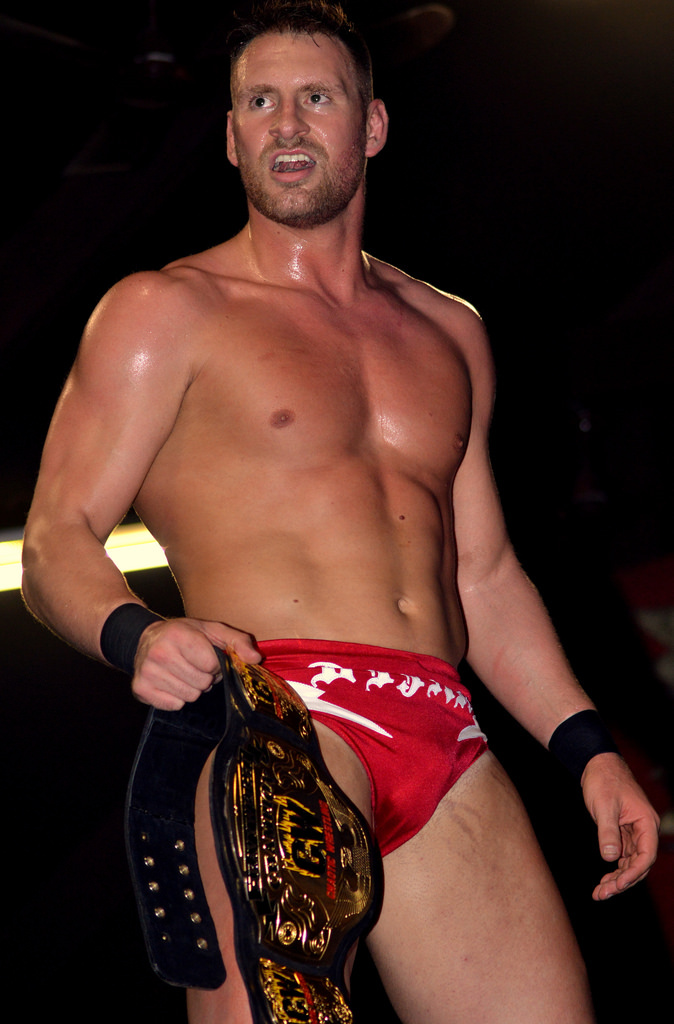
Donovan Dijak, who main evented one of the Ring of Honor Wrestling episodes taped during the Toronto show

The May 11 Toronto event was advertised as being main evented by Jay Lethal taking on Donovan Dijak. The storyline behind the two dated back to early 2015, when Dijak won the Top Prospect Tournament. In the aftermath, Dijak agreed to forgo his earned shot at Jay Lethal's ROH World Television Championship by joining him in Truth Martini's House of Truth stable. Finally, at the end of the year, after Dijak had been approached by Prince Nana, Martini fired Dijak, who quickly picked up Nana as his new manager and announced he would dissolve the House of Truth one member at a time. After in storyline hospitalizing Martini and defeating former tag team partner Joey Daddiego, Dijak attacked Lethal on April 30, dropped him with his finishing maneuver, Feast Your Eyes, and posed with the ROH World Championship belt. The match was not advertised as being for the title. The show also included reigning IWGP Junior Heavyweight Champion Kushida taking on Kyle O'Reilly in a non-title match. This was a rematch from the finals of NJPW's 2015 Best of the Super Juniors tournament, where Kushida defeated O'Reilly.

The May 14 New York City event was advertised as being main evented by a six-man tag team match, where a New Japan Pro-Wrestling "All Stars" team, made up of Hiroshi Tanahashi, Kazuchika Okada and Tomohiro Ishii, would take on a Ring of Honor "All Stars" team, made up of Jay Briscoe, Jay Lethal and Roderick Strong. However, on May 13, ROH rearranged the entire card with a new three-way tag team main event, where Bullet Club's Adam Cole and Matt Jackson take on Kazuchika Okada and Tomohiro Ishii, representing NJPW, and Jay Lethal and Roderick Strong, representing ROH. Also on the card, War Machine (Hanson and Ray Rowe) were set to defend the ROH World Tag Team Championship in a three-way match against The Addiction (Christopher Daniels and Frankie Kazarian) and reDRagon. However, on May 9, The Addiction defeated War Machine in an unadvertised match at the Dearborn show to capture the title. On May 13, ROH announced a title rematch between The Addiction and War Machine for the event.

== Results ==
May 9
No.	Results	Stipulations	Times
1^{D}	Kamaitachi defeated Will Ferrara	Singles match	06:28
2	A. C. H. and Matt Sydal defeated Beer City Bruiser and Silas Young	Tag team match	07:36
3	Roderick Strong defeated Lio Rush	Singles match	10:44
4	War Machine (Hanson and Ray Rowe) (c) defeated Chaos (Gedo and Kazuchika Okada)	Tag team match for the ROH World Tag Team Championship	11:52
5	Kushida defeated Dalton Castle (with the Boys)	Singles match	12:58
6	Hiroshi Tanahashi and Michael Elgin defeated The All Night Express (Kenny King and Rhett Titus)	Tag team match	09:54
7	Tomohiro Ishii defeated Moose (with Stokely Hathaway)	Singles match	08:24
8	The Addiction (Christopher Daniels and Frankie Kazarian) defeated War Machine (Hanson and Ray Rowe) (c)	Tag team match for the ROH World Tag Team Championship	08:12
9	reDRagon (Bobby Fish and Kyle O'Reilly) defeated Los Ingobernables de Japón (Jay Lethal and Tetsuya Naito) (with Taeler Hendrix)	Tag team match	16:46
10	Bullet Club (Adam Cole, Matt Jackson, Nick Jackson, Tama Tonga and Tanga Loa/Tanga Roa^{†}) defeated The Briscoes (Jay Briscoe and Mark Briscoe), Colt Cabana and The Motor City Machine Guns (Alex Shelley and Chris Sabin)	Ten-man tag team match	20:10
(c) / – the champion(s) heading into the match; D / – this was a dark match

May 11 (TV taping)
No.	Results	Stipulations	Times
1^{D}	Bob Evans and Tim Hughes defeated Kenny Lush and Rip Impact	Tag team match	—
2	A. C. H. defeated Lio Rush	Singles match	04:13
3	The Motor City Machine Guns (Alex Shelley and Chris Sabin) defeated The Addiction (Christopher Daniels and Frankie Kazarian) and Roppongi Vice (Beretta and Rocky Romero)	Three-way tag team match	09:30
4	The Elite (Kenny Omega, Matt Jackson and Nick Jackson) defeated Hiroshi Tanahashi, Michael Elgin and Yoshitatsu	Six-man tag team match	09:40
5	Kazuchika Okada (with Gedo) defeated Matt Sydal	Singles match	08:40
6	Colt Cabana defeated Adam Page	Singles match	07:16
7	Jay Lethal (with Taeler Hendrix) defeated Donovan Dijak (with Prince Nana)	Singles match	12:23
8	Dalton Castle (with the Boys) defeated Gedo	Singles match	07:54
9	Tetsuya Naito defeated Moose (with Stokely Hathaway)	Singles match	09:28
10	The All Night Express (Kenny King and Rhett Titus) defeated Cheeseburger and Jyushin Thunder Liger	Tag team match	06:42
11	Kyle O'Reilly defeated Kushida	Singles match	11:00
12	Dalton Castle (with the Boys) defeated Caprice Coleman, Cedric Alexander (with Veda Scott) and Kamaitachi	Four corner survival match	08:42
13	Tomohiro Ishii defeated Will Ferrara	Singles match	09:28
14	The Briscoes (Jay Briscoe and Mark Briscoe), Jay Lethal and Roderick Strong defeated Bullet Club (Kenny Omega, Matt Jackson, Tama Tonga and Tanga Loa/Tanga Roa^{†})	Eight-man tag team match	13:16
D / – this was a dark match

May 14
No.	Results	Stipulations	Times
1^{D}	Cheeseburger and Davey Vega defeated Joey Daddiego and Juan Francisco de Coronado	Tag team match	—
2	reDRagon (Bobby Fish and Kyle O'Reilly) defeated The All Night Express (Kenny King and Rhett Titus)	Tag team match	11:30
3	Dalton Castle (with the Boys) defeated Lio Rush, Michael Elgin and Moose (with Stokely Hathaway)	Four corner survival match	11:04
4	Kushida defeated Silas Young	Singles match	10:38
5	The Motor City Machine Guns (Alex Shelley and Chris Sabin) defeated Chaos (Beretta and Gedo) (with Rocky Romero)	Tag team match	10:36
6	The Briscoes (Jay Briscoe and Mark Briscoe) and Jyushin Thunder Liger defeated Bullet Club (Adam Page, Tama Tonga and Tanga Loa/Tanga Roa^{†})	Six-man tag team match	09:58
7	Donovan Dijak (with Prince Nana) defeated Cedric Alexander	Singles match	—
8	War Machine (Hanson and Ray Rowe) defeated The Addiction (Christopher Daniels and Frankie Kazarian) (c) by disqualification	Tag team match for the ROH World Tag Team Championship	10:39
9	Hiroshi Tanahashi defeated Matt Sydal	Singles match	11:14
10	Tetsuya Naito defeated A. C. H.	Singles match	13:52
11	Jay Lethal (with Taeler Hendrix) and Roderick Strong defeated Bullet Club (Adam Cole and Matt Jackson) (with Nick Jackson) and Chaos (Kazuchika Okada and Tomohiro Ishii) (with Gedo)	Three-way tag team match	16:04
(c) / – the champion(s) heading into the match; D / – this was a dark match

== Notes ==
- The name has been written as both "Tanga Loa" and "Tanga Roa".

== See also ==
- Professional wrestling in Canada
