= Back to the Yokohama Arena =

2014 New Japan Pro-Wrestling pay-per-view event

- Promotional poster for the event, featuring Hiroshi Tanahashi, Kazuchika Okada and Shinsuke Nakamura
- Promotion: New Japan Pro-Wrestling
- Date: May 25, 2014
- City: Yokohama, Japan
- Venue: Yokohama Arena
- Attendance: 7,800

Pay-per-view chronology
← Previous; War of the Worlds	Next → Best of the Super Jr. XXI

New Japan Pro-Wrestling events chronology
← Previous; War of the Worlds	Next → Dominion 6.21

Back to the Yokohama Arena was a professional wrestling pay-per-view (PPV) event promoted by New Japan Pro-Wrestling (NJPW). The event took take place on May 25, 2014, at the Yokohama Arena in Yokohama, Kanagawa and marked NJPW's first event at the arena in eleven years.

The event, considered one of NJPW's biggest of the year, following Wrestle Kingdom 8 in Tokyo Dome and the finals of the G1 Climax, featured four championship matches and was headlined by a match for the promotion's top title, the IWGP Heavyweight Championship. The event aired domestically as a regular PPV and internationally as an internet PPV. While the show was praised for its match quality, it was considered a disappointment due to poor attendance numbers.

NJPW did not return to the Yokohama Arena until 8 years later, on the third night of Wrestle Kingdom 16 in 2022.

== Production ==
=== Background ===
On November 6, 2013, Bushiroad, the owners of NJPW, announced a special project celebrating their seventh anniversary; a return to Yokohama Arena with the Back to the Yokohama Arena event on May 25, 2014. This would mark NJPW's first event at the arena since November 3, 2003, and the Yokohama Dead Out show. The entire card for the event was released on May 4, the day after Wrestling Dontaku 2014.

=== Storylines ===
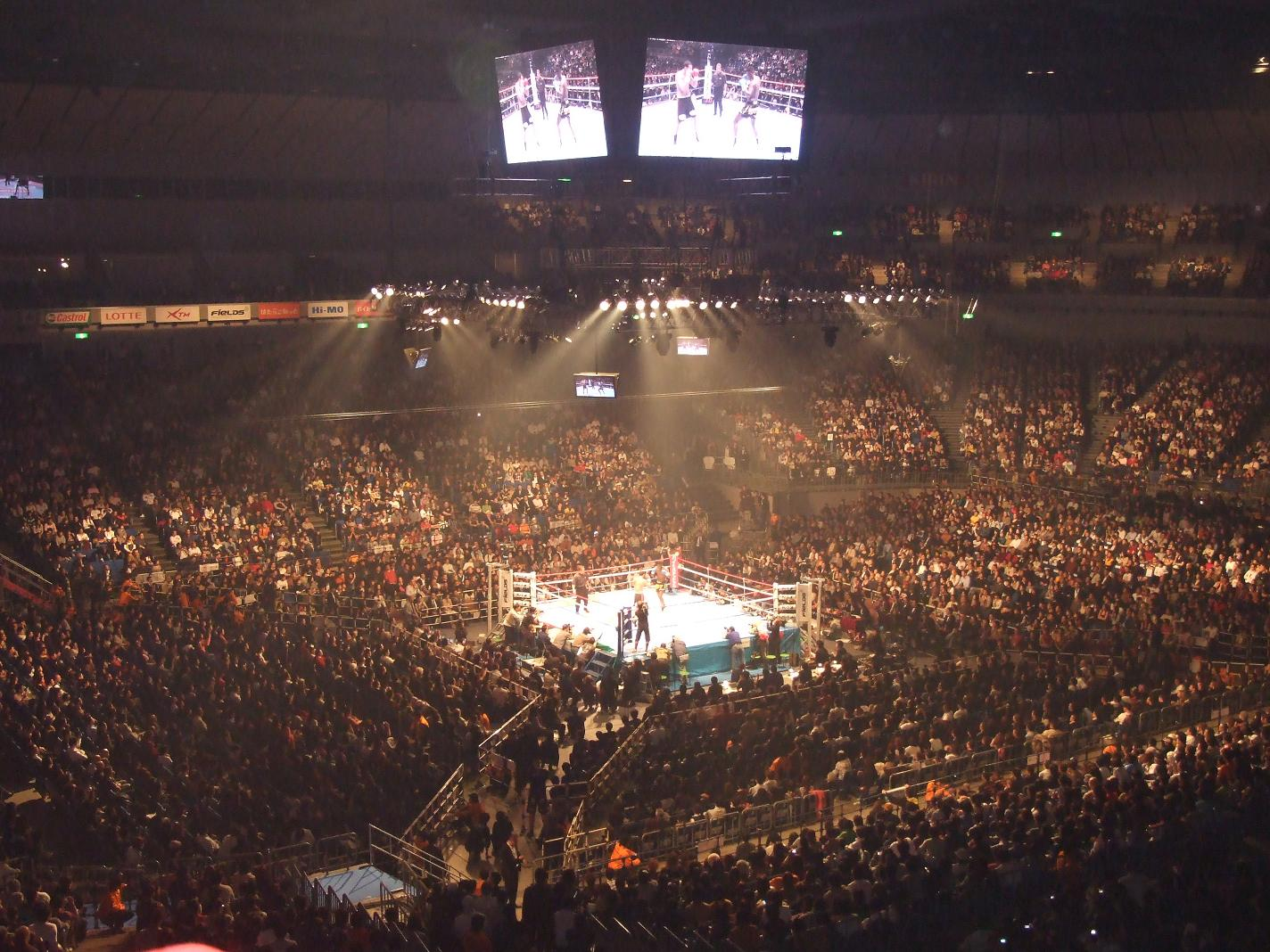
Yokohama Arena

Back to the Yokohama Arena featured ten professional wrestling matches involving different wrestlers from pre-existing scripted feuds, plots, and storylines. Wrestlers portrayed villains or heroes as they followed a series of events that built tension, and culminated in a wrestling match or series of matches. Four of the matches were contested for championships.

Back to the Yokohama Arena was the final event before the start of the 2014 Best of the Super Juniors tournament and as part of the build-up to it, the opening match of the show featured eight participants in a multi-man tag team match. The first title match would feature Tencozy (Hiroyoshi Tenzan and Satoshi Kojima) defending the NWA World Tag Team Championship against former champions, K.E.S. (Davey Boy Smith Jr. and Lance Archer), and representatives of the National Wrestling Alliance (NWA) Rob Conway and Wes Brisco in a three-way match. Conway, who is also a former NWA World Tag Team Champion alongside Jax Dane, had made sporadic appearances for NJPW since Invasion Attack in April 2013, while Brisco made his debut for the promotion at Wrestling Dontaku 2014. The villainous NWA side, led by president Bruce Tharpe, had been involved in a storyline rivalry with Tencozy and especially Satoshi Kojima ever since Invasion Attack. During the first half of 2014, both Conway and Brisco had unsuccessfully challenged Kojima for his NWA World Heavyweight Championship. The second title match would see Tomohiro Ishii defend the NEVER Openweight Championship against IWGP Junior Heavyweight Champion Kota Ibushi as part of a rivalry that dated back to previous August's G1 Climax. Also on the card was a tag team match between the teams of Meiyu Tag (Hirooki Goto and Katsuyori Shibata) and Ace to King (Hiroshi Tanahashi and Togi Makabe). On May 5 at Wrestling Dontaku 2014, both teams asserted themselves as the next challengers for Bullet Club's (Doc Gallows and Karl Anderson) IWGP Tag Team Championship, which led to this match, where the winner will be getting the next title shot. In the build-up to the match it was insinuated that there were problems between Goto and Shibata due to Shibata showing more interest in settling a grudge with Tanahashi than another shot at the IWGP Tag Team Championship.

During the event mixed martial artists Daniel and Rolles Gracie would be working their first singles matches in NJPW. Since starting with the promotion in January 2014, the Gracies had worked only tag team matches and have taken advantage of the "ishu kakutōgi sen" rules of their matches, which had allowed them to use their gis to choke their opponents and secure submission victories. Ever since their debuts for the promotion, the Gracies had feuded with Kazushi Sakuraba, who gained fame in the MMA circles as "The Gracie Hunter" for his victories over members of the Gracie family. However, in NJPW the Gracies had dominated Sakuraba, with Rolles twice submitting him with a gi choke. In the second of the losses, Sakuraba teamed with Shinsuke Nakamura, who also had a history with the Gracies, losing to Daniel in a legitimate MMA fight in December 2002. Following the match at Wrestling Dontaku 2014, Daniel challenged Nakamura to a match for his IWGP Intercontinental Championship, leading to Back to the Yokohama Arena, where the title match, along with a singles grudge match between Sakuraba and Rolles, was set to take place. Both matches were worked under "ishu kakutōgi sen" rules, but were scripted professional wrestling matches and not legitimate MMA fights.

Wrestling Dontaku 2014 marked a rebirth for the villainous Bullet Club stable, when Yujiro Takahashi turned on the Chaos stable and joined Bullet Club by helping A.J. Styles defeat Kazuchika Okada for the IWGP Heavyweight Championship. The undercard of Back to the Yokohama Arena would feature Takahashi's first match as a member of Bullet Club, when he teamed with his new stablemates in an eight-man tag team match. The event also featured Bullet Club's Bad Luck Fale taking on Tetsuya Naito in a match, where NJPW suggested the winner could enter a singles title picture. The two previously faced off in the second round of March's New Japan Cup, where Fale was victorious. In the main event of the show, Okada would receive his rematch for the IWGP Heavyweight Championship. His opponent would be the winner of a title match between Styles and Michael Elgin at War of the Worlds, a NJPW and Ring of Honor (ROH) co-promoted event in New York City on May 17. Okada was eventually added to the match, making it a three-way. Styles, however, retained his title by pinning Elgin, making the match between him and Okada official for Back to the Yokohama Arena.

== Event ==
In the first title match of the event, Tencozy made their second successful defense of the NWA World Tag Team Championship in a three-way match with Tenzan pinning Brisco for the win. Post-match, K.E.S., having not been involved in the finish, challenged Tencozy to a future title match. The next match featured a major storyline development in the long storyline rivalry between Minoru Suzuki and Toru Yano. Before the match started, Lance Archer blocked referee Tiger Hattori's view of the ring, while Yano's Chaos stablemate and tag team partner Takashi Iizuka, with whom he had held both the IWGP and GHC Tag Team Championships, turned on him, hitting him with his signature iron claws. Archer then released Hattori to start the match and count a quick pinfall win for Suzuki over Yano. Post-match, Iizuka put on a shirt of Suzuki's Suzuki-gun stable. In the second title match of the event, Tomohiro Ishii made his fourth successful defense of the NEVER Openweight Championship against IWGP Junior Heavyweight Champion Kota Ibushi. After the match, Ishii was attacked by his former Chaos stablemate Yujiro Takahashi, who set himself up as his next challenger.

In the next match, Hiroshi Tanahashi and Togi Makabe defeated Hirooki Goto and Katsuyori Shibata to become the number one contenders to the IWGP Tag Team Championship. The win was a result of miscommunication between Goto and Shibata, continuing the storyline dissension between the two. During the match, Makabe suffered a legitimate mandibular fracture, which forced him to miss the next couple of events. The singles match debuts of both Daniel and Rolles Gracie ended in losses for the Brazilians. Rolles was defeated by Kazushi Sakuraba via technical submission, while Daniel was pinned by Shinsuke Nakamura, who in the process made his first successful defense of the IWGP Intercontinental Championship. Post-match, Nakamura was challenged by Bad Luck Fale, who earlier in the event had defeated Tetsuya Naito. In the main event of the evening, A.J. Styles made his second successful defense of the IWGP Heavyweight Championship against previous champion Kazuchika Okada. The match featured outside interference from both Bullet Club and Okada's Chaos stablemate Tomohiro Ishii, who entered the ring to avenge Takahashi's earlier attack on him.

== Reception ==
Dave Meltzer of the Wrestling Observer Newsletter wrote that the show had a "very different feel from the company's recent major shows" due to the disappointing attendance number, which he blamed on poor matchmaking and an oversaturated market. Meltzer wrote that while A.J. Styles had the talent, it was too early for him to be a main event draw and that Japanese fans had not accepted him as the "real world champion". Regarding the matches at Back to the Yokohama Arena, Meltzer gave the highest ratings of four and three quarter stars out of five to the NEVER Openweight Championship match and four and a half stars to the main event. Meltzer gave the lowest rating of one and a half stars to the Intercontinental Championship match, while also criticizing the entire Gracie storyline, which culminated at Back to the Yokohama Arena, writing that it "didn't connect with anyone".

== Results ==
No.	Results	Stipulations	Times
1	Bushi, Ryusuke Taguchi and Time Splitters (Alex Shelley and Kushida) defeated El Desperado, Jyushin Thunder Liger, Máscara Dorada and Tiger Mask	Eight-man tag team match	08:25
2	Bullet Club (Doc Gallows, Karl Anderson, Tama Tonga and Yujiro Takahashi) defeated Captain New Japan, Manabu Nakanishi, Tomoaki Honma and Yuji Nagata	Eight-man tag team match	09:03
3	Tencozy (Hiroyoshi Tenzan and Satoshi Kojima) (c) defeated K.E.S. (Davey Boy Smith Jr. and Lance Archer) and Rob Conway and Wes Brisco (with Bruce Tharpe)	Three-way tag team match for the NWA World Tag Team Championship	11:38
4	Suzuki-gun (Minoru Suzuki and Shelton X Benjamin) (with Davey Boy Smith Jr. Lance Archer, Taichi and Taka Michinoku) defeated Crazy Ichizoku (Takashi Iizuka and Toru Yano)	Tag team match	00:08
5	Bad Luck Fale defeated Tetsuya Naito	Singles match	12:05
6	Kazushi Sakuraba defeated Rolles Gracie	Ishu kakutōgi sen rules match	05:33
7	Tomohiro Ishii (c) defeated Kota Ibushi	Singles match for the NEVER Openweight Championship	19:22
8	Ace to King (Hiroshi Tanahashi and Togi Makabe) defeated Meiyu Tag (Hirooki Goto and Katsuyori Shibata)	Tag team match to determine the number one contender to the IWGP Tag Team Championship	17:22
9	Shinsuke Nakamura (c) defeated Daniel Gracie (with Rolles Gracie)	Ishu kakutōgi sen rules match for the IWGP Intercontinental Championship	10:24
10	A.J. Styles (c) (with Doc Gallows, Karl Anderson and Tama Tonga) defeated Kazuchika Okada (with Gedo)	Singles match for the IWGP Heavyweight Championship	26:05
(c) / – the champion(s) heading into the match

== See also ==
- List of New Japan Pro-Wrestling pay-per-view events
