= ROH/NJPW War of the Worlds (2014) =

Professional wrestling event

War of the Worlds
- Promotional poster for the event
- Promotion(s): New Japan Pro-Wrestling; Ring of Honor
- Date: May 17, 2014
- City: New York City, New York, U.S.
- Venue: Hammerstein Ballroom
- Attendance: 3,000

Pay-per-view chronology
← Previous; Global Wars	Next → (NJPW) Back to the Yokohama Arena (ROH) Best in the World

War of the Worlds chronology
← Previous; First	Next → 2015

War of the Worlds was a professional wrestling supershow co-produced by the American Ring of Honor (ROH) and Japanese New Japan Pro-Wrestling (NJPW) promotions. The event took place on May 17, 2014, at the Hammerstein Ballroom in New York City, New York, U.S. and aired live on Internet pay-per-view (iPPV) through Ustream.

All matches on the iPPV featured wrestlers from ROH taking on wrestlers from NJPW. As a result, bookers from both promotions worked together to put the event together. The event featured nine matches with five championships on the line; three from ROH and two from NJPW. In the only title change, reDRagon (Bobby Fish and Kyle O'Reilly) regained the ROH World Tag Team Championship from The Young Bucks (Matt and Nick Jackson). The event was headlined by a double main event for the top titles from both promotions. In the first, Adam Cole successfully defended the ROH World Championship against Jyushin Thunder Liger and in the second A.J. Styles successfully defended the IWGP Heavyweight Championship in a three-way match with Kazuchika Okada and Michael Elgin.

== Production ==
=== Background ===
Prior to Ring of Honor's (ROH) February 2014 HonorCon weekend in Philadelphia, Pennsylvania, the promotion had teased a "big announcement". The announcement was made during an ROH event on February 22, when ROH chief operating officer Joe Koff and booker Delirious along with New Japan Pro-Wrestling (NJPW) chairman Naoki Sugabayashi and his translator, referee Tiger Hattori, entered the ring to reveal a partnership, which would see the Japanese promotion's top wrestlers come over to North America for joint shows in May 2014. The first, titled Global Wars, would be set to take place on May 10 in Toronto, Ontario, and the second, titled War of the Worlds, on May 17 in New York City, New York. NJPW billed the events as its second tour of North America, following the NJPW Invasion Tour 2011 three years earlier. During the next few weeks, ROH announced the NJPW wrestlers taking part in the two events; IWGP Heavyweight Champion Kazuchika Okada, IWGP Intercontinental Champion Hiroshi Tanahashi, Shinsuke Nakamura, NJPW bookers Gedo and Jado, Takaaki Watanabe, Jyushin Thunder Liger, Kushida, Karl Anderson, Forever Hooligans (Alex Koslov and Rocky Romero), and The Young Bucks (Matt and Nick Jackson), who are regulars for both NJPW and ROH, holding the IWGP Junior Heavyweight Tag Team and ROH World Tag Team Championships between the two promotions. NJPW workers not taking part in the North American tour were instead announced for a simultaneous tour of Thailand. The first non-NJPW worker announced for the event was ROH regular A.J. Styles, who, however, signed a NJPW contract before the end of March. ROH also announced that the two promotions would host a tryout seminar on May 13 and 14 in Bristol, Pennsylvania. On March 27, ROH announced that the two events would be broadcast live on internet pay-per-view through Ustream, which had successfully broadcast NJPW iPPVs for the past two years. Previously, ROH had used various sites to broadcast their own iPPVs, often facing streaming issues, which even led to the promotion announcing they were no longer going to be doing live iPPVs.

War of the Worlds, unlike Global Wars, featured several interpromotional matches between NJPW and ROH, leading to Gedo and Jado booking the show together with Delirious with Rocky Romero acting as the intermediary as both sides had wrestlers they wanted to protect.

=== Storylines ===
War of the Worlds featured nine professional wrestling matches that involved different wrestlers from pre-existing scripted feuds and storylines. Wrestlers portrayed villains, heroes, or less distinguishable characters in the scripted events that built tension and culminated in a wrestling match or series of matches.

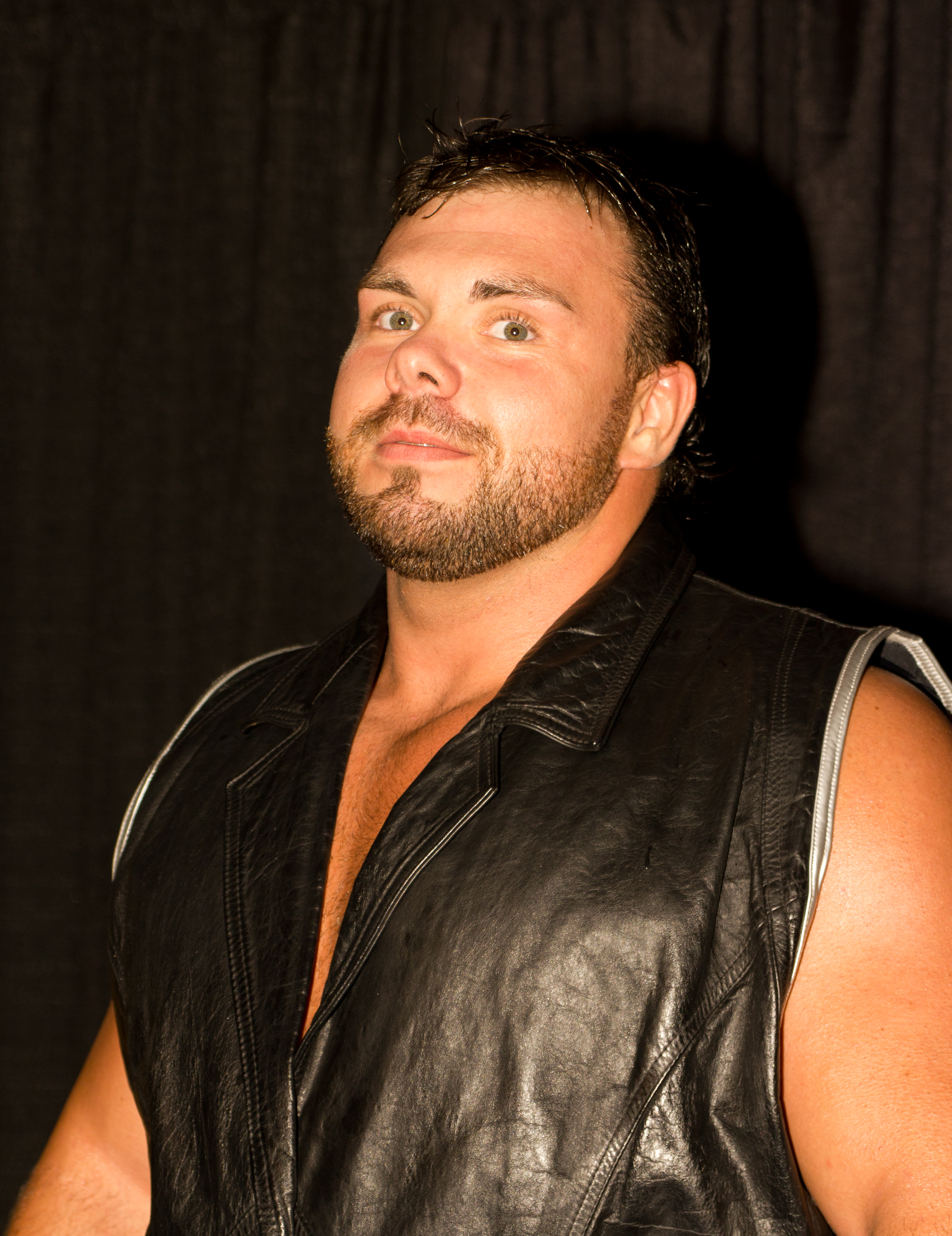
Michael Elgin, who entered War of the Worlds as the number one contender to the IWGP Heavyweight Championship

On March 22, 2014, ROH announced a match for its April Supercard of Honor VIII event between Kevin Steen and Michael Elgin, where the winner would get to challenge Kazuchika Okada for the IWGP Heavyweight Championship at War of the Worlds. Another match at Supercard of Honor VIII was used to determine who would challenge The Young Bucks for the ROH World Tag Team Championship at War of the Worlds. Elgin and reDRagon (Bobby Fish and Kyle O'Reilly) won the two matches, making the first two matches official for War of the Worlds. reDRagon are former two-time ROH World Tag Team Champions and lost the title to The Young Bucks on March 8, 2014. On May 12, ROH announced that Ultimate Fighting Championship (UFC) fighter Tom Lawlor would be in reDRagon's corner for the match. Lawlor is a self-described "diehard pro wrestling fan" and has appeared on Wrestling Observer Radio talking about NJPW events. ROH later backtracked on the IWGP Heavyweight Championship match announcement, noting that Okada first had to defend his title at NJPW's Wrestling Dontaku 2014 on May 3 against A.J. Styles and the winner of that match would go on to face Elgin. In the end, Styles won the match to become the new champion and move on to face Elgin at War of the Worlds. The match at War of the Worlds was to be the third one to take place between Styles and Elgin; the first on February 22, 2014, ended in a time limit draw, while Elgin won the second on April 19 to earn a future shot at the ROH World Championship.

On April 22, ROH announced that Bullet Club's Doc Gallows and Karl Anderson would defend the IWGP Tag Team Championship at War of the Worlds. The following day their challengers were revealed as former eight-time ROH World Tag Team Champions The Briscoes (Jay and Mark). Also announced was Jyushin Thunder Liger challenging for the ROH World Championship. His opponent would be the winner of a title match between Adam Cole and Kevin Steen at Global Wars, while the loser would go on to face Shinsuke Nakamura. On May 10, Cole defeated Steen to retain his title, moving on to the title match with Liger, while Steen was now set to face Nakamura. Two more interpromotional matches were also announced; in the first Jay Lethal would defend the ROH World Television Championship against Kushida and in the second Hiroshi Tanahashi would face Michael Bennett. The day after Okada had lost the IWGP Heavyweight Championship, NJPW announced that he would be facing ROH's Cedric Alexander at War of the Worlds. NJPW also announced the final two interpromotional matches for the event; a tag team match, where Gedo and Jado were set to take on The Decade's B. J. Whitmer and Roderick Strong and a six-man tag team match, where Alex Koslov, Rocky Romero and Takaaki Watanabe would take on A. C. H., Matt Taven and Tommaso Ciampa. ROH completed the card with the addition of an all-ROH match, where Caprice Coleman was set to take on Silas Young. On May 14, ROH pulled Alexander from War of the Worlds as a result of a storyline injury suffered at the hands of The Decade at Global Wars.

== Event ==
Other on-screen personnel
Role:	Name:
Commentators	Kevin Kelly
Commentators	Steve Corino
Commentators	Nigel McGuinness
Ring announcers	Bobby Cruise
Referees	Brian Gorie
Referees	Marty Asami
Referees	Paul Turner
Referees	Tiger Hattori
Referees	Todd Sinclair

=== Pre-show ===
During the pre-show ROH was set to present a match between Caprice Coleman and Silas Young, however, Young turned the match down, downplaying Coleman. Coleman then challenged Jimmy Jacobs for what The Decade had done to Cedric Alexander at Global Wars. Jacobs came out to seemingly accept the challenge, but Coleman was then attacked from behind by his real opponent, Jacobs' stablemate Adam Page. Coleman won the match, after dropping Page from the top rope with a hurricanrana and then pinning him with the Sky Splitter off the top rope. After the match, Jacobs, upset about Page's loss, kicked and slapped his stablemate, before forcing him to help him out of the ring.

=== Preliminary matches ===
The pay-per-view opened with an interview segment with the Bullet Club stable of A.J. Styles, Doc Gallows, Karl Anderson and Matt and Nick Jackson. After Anderson introduced Styles as the IWGP Heavyweight Champion, Styles introduced the stable, before being interrupted by the entrance of Kazuchika Okada and Gedo, the former now being without an opponent for the event due to Alexander being pulled. With Anderson acting as a translator, Okada told Styles that he could beat him. Styles responded by claiming he had proved that Okada could not beat him "a month ago in Fukuoka", before noting that he already had a match for the event with Michael Elgin. Elgin then also entered the ring and requested that ROH matchmaker Nigel McGuinness turn the IWGP Heavyweight Championship match into a three-way match by adding Okada to it. McGuinness entered the arena and, after getting an approval from NJPW chairman Naoki Sugabayashi at ringside and all three competitors, made the match official. Three-way title matches are rare in Japan; the previous three-way match for the IWGP Heavyweight Championship took place in October 2005.

The first match of the pay-per-view saw NJPW's Alex Koslov, Rocky Romero and Takaaki Watanabe take on ROH's ACH, Matt Taven and Tommaso Ciampa. At the end of the match, ACH dove out of the ring onto Koslov and Romero, while Taven hit his finishing maneuver, the Climax, on Watanabe for the win.

The second match featured The Decade's B.J. Whitmer and Roderick Strong, accompanied by stablemates Adam Page and Jimmy Jacobs, taking on Jado & Gedo. Near the end of the match, Jado locked Strong in the Crossface of Jado, but Whitmer broke the hold. Jado then hit Strong with a steel chair, but he survived Gedo's pinfall attempt and came back with a Death by Roderick. Whitmer then hit Gedo with a lariat, which was followed by Strong pinning him for the win with the Sick Kick. After the match, Cedric Alexander, with a taped shoulder, ran to the ring to attack The Decage, who, however, got the upper hand after Jacobs hit Alexander from behind. Eventually, security guards separated The Decade from Alexander. Afterwards, Alexander kept trying to get his hands on Strong, who, however, ran away from his rival.

The third match and the first title match of the iPPV saw Jay Lethal, accompanied by his manager Truth Martini, defend the ROH World Television Championship against Kushida. Mid-match, Martini was ejected from ringside, after he pulled referee Todd Sinclair from the ring to prevent him from counting a pinfall for Kushida. Despite this, Lethal retained his title after countering a springboard move into a superkick and then pinning Kushida with the Lethal Injection, giving ROH their third straight win in the head-to-head matches between ROH and NJPW.

Next up was Bullet Club's Doc Gallows and Karl Anderson making their fourth defense of the IWGP Tag Team Championship against the Briscoes (Jay and Mark). For the first part of the match, the defending champions isolated Mark from Jay, but he eventually managed to break free and tag in his brother, after which all four men entered the ring. The Briscoes went for a Doomsday Device on Anderson, but Gallows broke it up, resulting in Anderson hitting Mark with the Gun Stun and Gallows hitting Jay with a chokebomb. Bullet Club then hit Jay with their double-team finishing maneuver, the Magic Killer, for the win and a successful title defense. After the match, the two teams shook hands, while also teasing a future rematch.

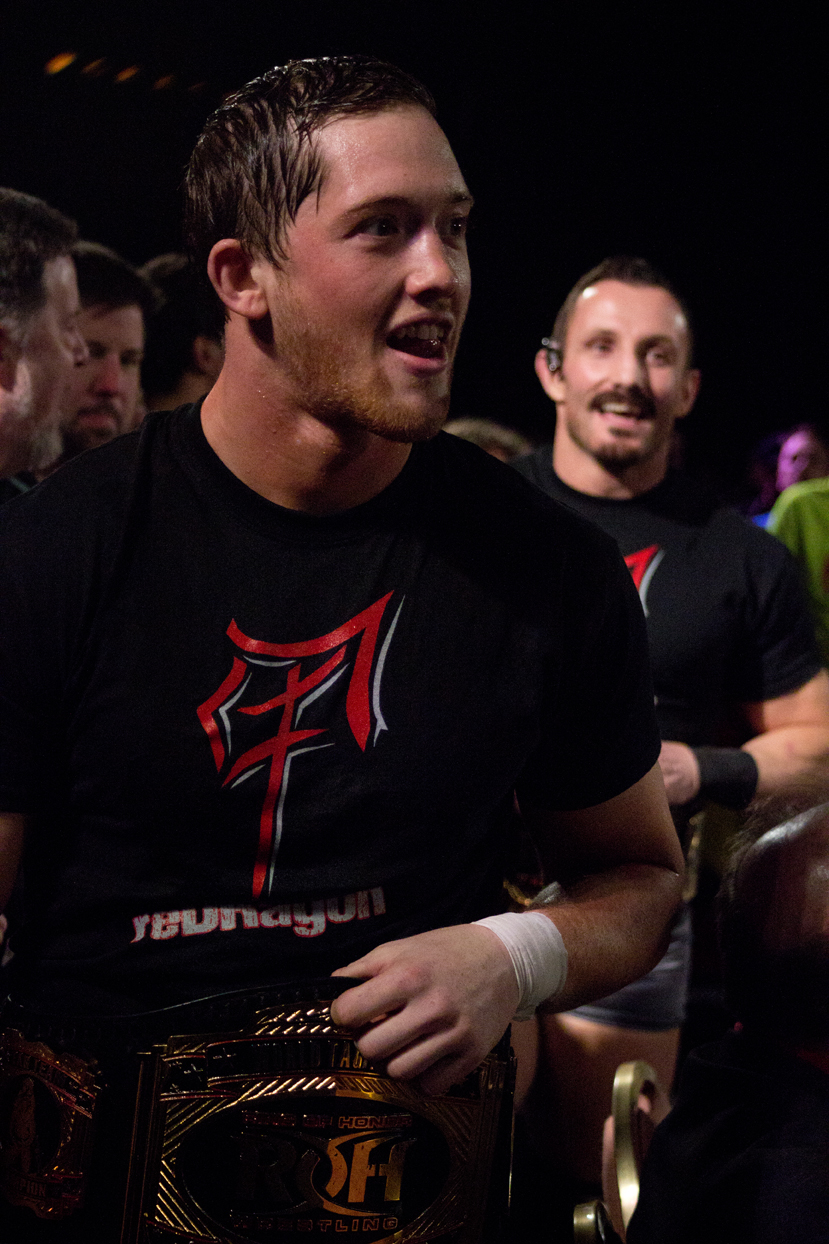
reDRagon (Kyle O'Reilly [front] and Bobby Fish [back]), who won the ROH World Tag Team Championship for the third time at War of the Worlds

The fifth match of the event saw ROH's Kevin Steen take on NJPW's IWGP Intercontinental Champion Shinsuke Nakamura in a non-title match. Towards the end of the match, Nakamura went for his finishing maneuver, the Boma Ye, but Steen countered it into a powerbomb. Steen then dropped Nakamura with a superplex, but Nakamura kicked out of the pinfall attempt. Steen then went for his finishing maneuver, the package piledriver, but Nakamura slipped out and hit a Boma Ye from the middle rope, followed by another regular Boma Ye, but Steen kicked out from the following pinfall attempt at one. Nakamura then hit Steen with a third Boma Ye, which resulted in a three count and a win for the NJPW wrestler. After Nakamura had left the ring, Steen got a microphone and announced that, although he loved ROH, he was thinking about stepping away from the promotion to spend some time with his family. Steen was then interrupted by Silas Young, who claimed he was acting like a "pussy" and that his son would grow up to be a "quitter" like him. This led to Steen attacking Young and security re-entering the ring to break up another brawl. Steen attempted to dive out of the ring onto Young, but Young ducked out of the way, resulting in Steen landing only on the security guards.

The first match after an intermission featured another interpromotional match between Hiroshi Tanahashi and Michael Bennett, who was accompanied to the ring by his fiancée Maria Kanellis. During the match, Kanellis entered the ring to interfere, which resulted in Tanahashi locking her in a cloverleaf. Towards the end of the match, Kanellis distracted referee Todd Sinclair with a kiss, while Bennett hit Tanahashi with a piledriver, a move he in storyline was no longer allowed to use in ROH after losing to Kevin Steen in December 2013. After surviving the following pinfall attempt, Tanahashi blocked another piledriver on the ring apron and dropped Bennett onto the apron with a suplex. Tanahashi then dove out of the ring onto Bennett, lifted him back inside and then pinned him for the win with a High Fly Flow, tying the score in the interpromotional match series.

Next up was The Young Bucks of Matt and Nick Jackson defending the ROH World Tag Team Championship against previous champions, reDRagon of Bobby Fish and Kyle O'Reilly, who were accompanied by UFC fighter Tom Lawlor. Before the start of the match, The Young Bucks crotched Lawlor by kicking the ring ropes as he was exiting the ring. Lawlor later avenged this by crotching Matt Jackson. At the end of the match, The Young Bucks went for their double-team finishing maneuver, the More Bang for Your Buck, but it was blocked by O'Reilly, who then dropped Matt with a brainbuster. reDRagon then hit their own finisher, the Chasing the Dragon, on Matt, after which O'Reilly locked him in the Armageddon submission hold, while Fish held Nick back. Matt submitted to the hold, making reDRagon three-time ROH World Tag Team Champions.

=== Main event matches ===
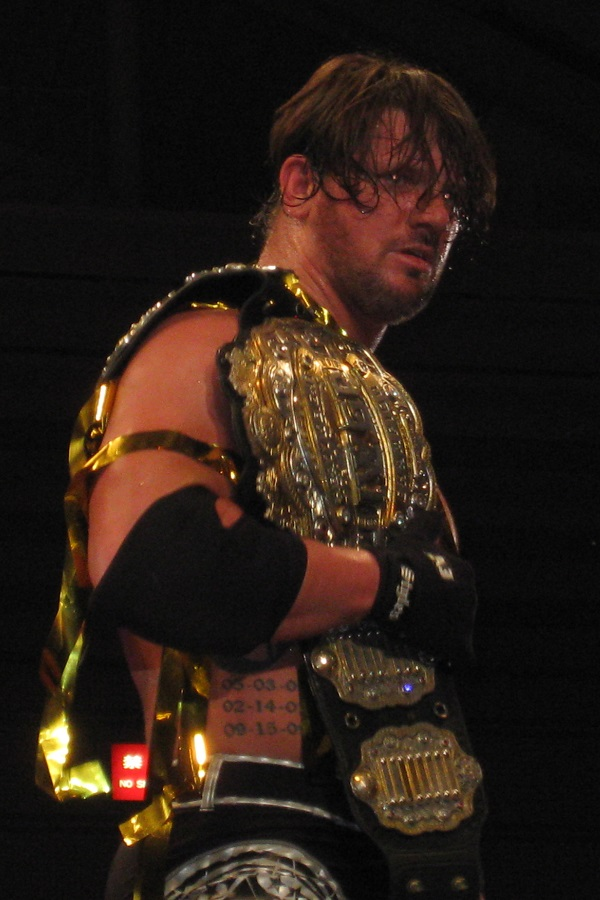
IWGP Heavyweight Champion A.J. Styles, who made his first title defense at War of the Worlds

The last ROH match featured Adam Cole defending the ROH World Championship against Jyushin Thunder Liger. Towards the end of the match, Cole blocked a Liger Bomb, grabbed a hold of Liger's mask and then hit him with a superkick. Cole then locked Liger in a figure-four leglock, forcing a submission to win the match and retain his title. After the match, Liger attempted to shake Cole's hand, but was turned down by the champion, who instead taunted him with the title belt.

The final match of the event saw A.J. Styles make his first defense of his newly won IWGP Heavyweight Championship against previous champion Kazuchika Okada and Michael Elgin in a three-way match. At the end of the match, Okada blocked a powerbomb from Elgin and hit him with a dropkick, followed by his finishing maneuver, the Rainmaker. However, before Okada could make the pin, Styles jumped into the ring and hit him with a springboard forearm smash, which sent him out of the ring. Styles then planted Elgin with the Styles Clash to win the match and retain his title. After the match, Adam Cole entered the ring and hit Styles, Okada and Elgin with the ROH World Championship belt, before declaring himself the best in the world.

After the iPPV went off the air, Cole was chased out of the ring by Hiroshi Tanahashi and Jyushin Thunder Liger. Tanahashi then grabbed a microphone, thanked the crowd and promised New Japan would be back. Meanwhile, on the iPPV broadcast, ROH presented a pre-taped vignette, where Christopher Daniels announced that he and another unnamed individual, whose face was hidden from the camera, were coming back to ROH at Best in the World 2014 on June 22.

== Aftermath ==
As soon as War of the Worlds ended, NJPW officially announced an IWGP Heavyweight Championship rematch between Styles and Okada for the Back to the Yokohama Arena event on May 25. At the event, Styles defeated Okada for his second successful title defense. On June 5, ROH revealed Frankie Kazarian as the man who appeared in the iPPV's closing vignette with Christopher Daniels. War of the Worlds was released on DVD by ROH on June 17, 2014. Kevin Steen and Silas Young faced off on June 22 at Best in the World 2014 in a match, where Steen was victorious. Afterwards, he announced that his ROH contract was up in a "month and a half". Steen went on to sign with WWE shortly thereafter. Also at Best in the World 2014, Michael Elgin defeated Adam Cole to become the new ROH World Champion. The opening six-man tag team match, the ROH World Television and World Tag Team Championship matches were later broadcast on the July 5 episode of Ring of Honor Wrestling. The relationship between NJPW and ROH continued later in 2014 with reDRagon winning both the 2014 Super Jr. Tag Tournament and the IWGP Junior Heavyweight Tag Team Championship, while Matt Taven and Michael Bennett took part in the 2014 World Tag League. On January 4, 2015, NJPW announced that the promotion would be returning to the United States in May 2015 to co-promote another show with ROH.

=== Reception ===
James Caldwell, reviewing the event for the Pro Wrestling Torch, praised the ROH World Tag Team Championship match, calling it "amazing" and giving it four out of five stars, his highest score for a match at the event. Wrestling Observer Newsletter's Dave Meltzer likewise called the match "super". Meltzer panned the audience at the Hammerstein Ballroom for their lack of reaction for the wrestling and compared it to Global Wars' audience, writing "[t]his action and Toronto's audience would have been unbeatable".

== Results ==
No.	Results	Stipulations	Times
1^{P}	Caprice Coleman defeated Adam Page (with Jimmy Jacobs)	Singles match	—
2	A. C. H., Matt Taven, and Tommaso Ciampa defeated Forever Hooligans (Alex Koslov and Rocky Romero) and Takaaki Watanabe	Six-man tag team match	04:30
3	The Decade (B. J. Whitmer and Roderick Strong) (with Adam Page and Jimmy Jacobs) defeated Gedo and Jado	Tag team match	08:40
4	Jay Lethal (c) (with Truth Martini) defeated Kushida	Singles match for the ROH World Television Championship	11:40
5	Bullet Club (Doc Gallows and Karl Anderson) (c) defeated The Briscoes (Jay Briscoe and Mark Briscoe)	Tag team match for the IWGP Tag Team Championship	10:40
6	Shinsuke Nakamura defeated Kevin Steen	Singles match	12:48
7	Hiroshi Tanahashi defeated Michael Bennett (with Maria Kanellis)	Singles match	13:44
8	reDRagon (Bobby Fish and Kyle O'Reilly) (with Tom Lawlor) defeated The Young Bucks (Matt Jackson and Nick Jackson) (c)	Tag team match for the ROH World Tag Team Championship	12:47
9	Adam Cole (c) defeated Jushin Thunder Liger	Singles match for the ROH World Championship	13:14
10	A.J. Styles (c) defeated Kazuchika Okada (with Gedo) and Michael Elgin	Three-way match for the IWGP Heavyweight Championship	18:02
(c) / – the champion(s) heading into the match; P / – the match was broadcast on the pre-show
