= ROH/NJPW War of the Worlds (2015) =

Professional wrestling event

War of the Worlds '15
- Promotional poster for the event, featuring wrestlers from both NJPW and ROH
- Promotion: New Japan Pro-Wrestling; Ring of Honor
- Date: May 12 and 13, 2015
- City: Philadelphia, Pennsylvania, U.S.
- Venue: 2300 Arena
- Attendance: 1,200 (both nights)

Event chronology
| ← Previous (NJPW) Wrestling Dontaku (ROH) Supercard of Honor IX | Next → Global Wars |

War of the Worlds chronology
| ← Previous; 2014 | Next → 2016 |

War of the Worlds '15 was a two-day professional wrestling supershow co-produced by the American Ring of Honor (ROH) and Japanese New Japan Pro-Wrestling (NJPW) promotions. The events took place on May 12 and 13, 2015, at the 2300 Arena in Philadelphia, Pennsylvania, U.S. Both nights were released by ROH on video on demand (VOD) the following week.

War of the Worlds '15 was the second annual War of the Worlds event co-produced by ROH and NJPW, following War of the Worlds, which took place on May 17, 2014, at the Hammerstein Ballroom in New York City.

== Production ==
Other on-screen personnel
| Role: | Name: |
|---|---|
| Commentators | Kevin Kelly |
| Commentators | Steve Corino |
| Commentators | Nigel McGuinness |
| Ring announcers | Bobby Cruise |
| Referees | Brian Gorie |
| Referees | Marty Asami |
| Referees | Paul Turner |
| Referees | Tiger Hattori |
| Referees | Todd Sinclair |

=== Background ===
On January 4, 2015, at their Wrestle Kingdom 9 in Tokyo Dome show, New Japan Pro-Wrestling (NJPW) announced that it would for the second year in a row co-produce an event with Ring of Honor (ROH) in May. At that point, no specific dates were announced and only the United States was named as a location. However, on February 25, ROH sent out a press release, announcing three co-produced events, as opposed to two shows in 2014, with War of the Worlds '15 taking place on May 13 in Philadelphia and Global Wars '15 on May 15 and 16 in Toronto, Canada. On March 7, War of the Worlds '15 was also expanded to a two-day event, taking place at the 2300 Arena over May 12 and 13. This was done due to the May 13 event quickly selling out. Both nights ended up being sold out in advance. ROH began announcing the NJPW wrestlers taking part in the events on April 1, starting with Hiroshi Tanahashi. Over the next nine days, ROH announced the remaining NJPW participants; Kazuchika Okada, Jyushin Thunder Liger, Tetsuya Naito, Takaaki Watanabe, Kushida, Gedo, and finally Shinsuke Nakamura. On April 16, ROH announced that the Bullet Club trio of A.J. Styles, Matt Jackson and Nick Jackson would also be taking part in the War of the Worlds '15 events. The following day, ROH put additional standing room tickets on sale for the two events. On April 20, ROH announced all eight matches for the first night of War of the Worlds '15. All eight matches for the second night were announced the following day. Also announced were pre-show autograph sessions for May 12 and 13, which would be attended by both NJPW and ROH wrestlers taking part in the tour.

=== Storylines ===
War of the Worlds '15 featured eight professional wrestling matches each night that involved different wrestlers from pre-existing scripted feuds and storylines. Wrestlers portrayed villains, heroes, or less distinguishable characters in the scripted events that built tension and culminated in a wrestling match or series of matches.

Due to featuring wrestlers from two different promotions, the events focused less on storyline rivalries and more on interpromotional matchups. However, one storyline introduced between the Bullet Club and The Kingdom stables was built across the two promotions. The rivalry between the two stables started on March 1, 2015, at ROH's 13th Anniversary Show, where The Kingdom's Matt Taven and Michael Bennett defeated Bullet Club's Karl Anderson to win a three-way tag team match, after Anderson's stablemate Doc Gallows was unable to make the event due to travel issues. This led to a match on April 5 at NJPW's Invasion Attack 2015, where Taven and Bennett defeated Anderson and Gallows to capture the IWGP Tag Team Championship. The rivalry continued throughout the next month and came to include Maria Kanellis and Amber Gallows, the wives of Bennett and Gallows, respectively. Anderson and Gallows were absent from War of the Worlds '15, working only the Global Wars '15 events, leaving A.J. Styles and The Young Bucks to enter the rivalry. War of the Worlds '15 marked the in-ring return of the third member of The Kingdom, Adam Cole, following an injury break. Cole was originally only announced for the second night, but ended up being revealed as Styles' mystery opponent on the first night. The first night featured a three-way non-title match between three sets of tag team champions as Bennett and Taven took on The Young Bucks, the reigning IWGP Junior Heavyweight Tag Team Champions, and ROH World Tag Team Champions The Addiction (Christopher Daniels and Frankie Kazarian).

The second night featured the only title match of the two events, which saw Jay Briscoe defend the ROH World Championship against Bobby Fish. Prior to the title match, Briscoe had gone over two years without being pinned or submitted in ROH; the last time he was pinned was on March 2, 2013, when Fish pinned him in a tag team match, where he and Kyle O'Reilly captured the ROH World Tag Team Championship from Jay and his brother Mark.

== Reception ==
Pro Wrestling Dot Net's Zack Zimmerman called Roderick Strong "the most spectacular wrestler" of the two events, writing that his matches with Kushida and Hiroshi Tanahashi were each night's best match "by a fair margin". Dave Meltzer of the Wrestling Observer Newsletter called Strong the ROH MVP of the entire week, writing that both Tanahashi and Shinsuke Nakamura were giving him rave reviews. Pro Wrestling Torch's Sean Radican called the first night a "tremendous show from start to finish", giving it nine points out of ten. He gave the highest rating of four and a half stars out of five to the match between A.J. Styles and Adam Cole, calling it "amazing" and a match of the year contender.

== Results ==
Night 1
| No. | Results | Stipulations | Times |
|---|---|---|---|
| 1 | Gedo defeated Delirious | Singles match | 06:55 |
| 2 | Roderick Strong defeated Kushida | Singles match | 16:20 |
| 3 | Jay Lethal (with Truth Martini) defeated Takaaki Watanabe | Singles match | 11:05 |
| 4 | The Young Bucks (Matt Jackson and Nick Jackson) defeated The Addiction (Christopher Daniels and Frankie Kazarian) and The Kingdom (Matt Taven and Michael Bennett) (with Maria Kanellis) | Three-way tag team match | 14:02 |
| 5 | Tetsuya Naito defeated Michael Elgin | Singles match | 10:48 |
| 6 | reDRagon (Bobby Fish and Kyle O'Reilly) defeated Hiroshi Tanahashi and Jyushin Thunder Liger | Tag team match | 11:29 |
| 7 | A.J. Styles defeated Adam Cole | Singles match | 15:45 |
| 8 | Chaos (Kazuchika Okada and Shinsuke Nakamura) defeated The Briscoes (Jay Briscoe and Mark Briscoe) | Tag team match | 18:11 |

Night 2
| No. | Results | Stipulations | Times |
|---|---|---|---|
| 1^{D} | J. Diesel (with Truth Martini) defeated The Romantic Touch | Singles match | — |
| 2 | Adam Page (with Colby Corino) defeated Takaaki Watanabe | Singles match | 11:35 |
| 3 | Michael Elgin defeated Kushida | Singles match | 13:29 |
| 4 | Tetsuya Naito defeated Kyle O'Reilly | Singles match | 14:18 |
| 5 | Shinsuke Nakamura defeated Jay Lethal (with Truth Martini), Jyushin Thunder Liger and Mark Briscoe | Four-way match | 16:29 |
| 6 | Hiroshi Tanahashi defeated Roderick Strong | Singles match | 16:57 |
| 7 | The Addiction (Christopher Daniels and Frankie Kazarian) defeated Chaos (Gedo and Kazuchika Okada) | Tag team match | 15:37 |
| 8 | Jay Briscoe (c) defeated Bobby Fish | Singles match for the ROH World Championship | 17:29 |
| 9 | The Kingdom (Adam Cole, Matt Taven and Michael Bennett) (with Maria Kanellis) defeated Bullet Club (A.J. Styles, Matt Jackson and Nick Jackson) | Six-man tag team match | 16:50 |
(c) / – the champion(s) heading into the match; D / – this was a dark match
