= Ted Reeve Community Arena =

Multi-purpose arena in Toronto

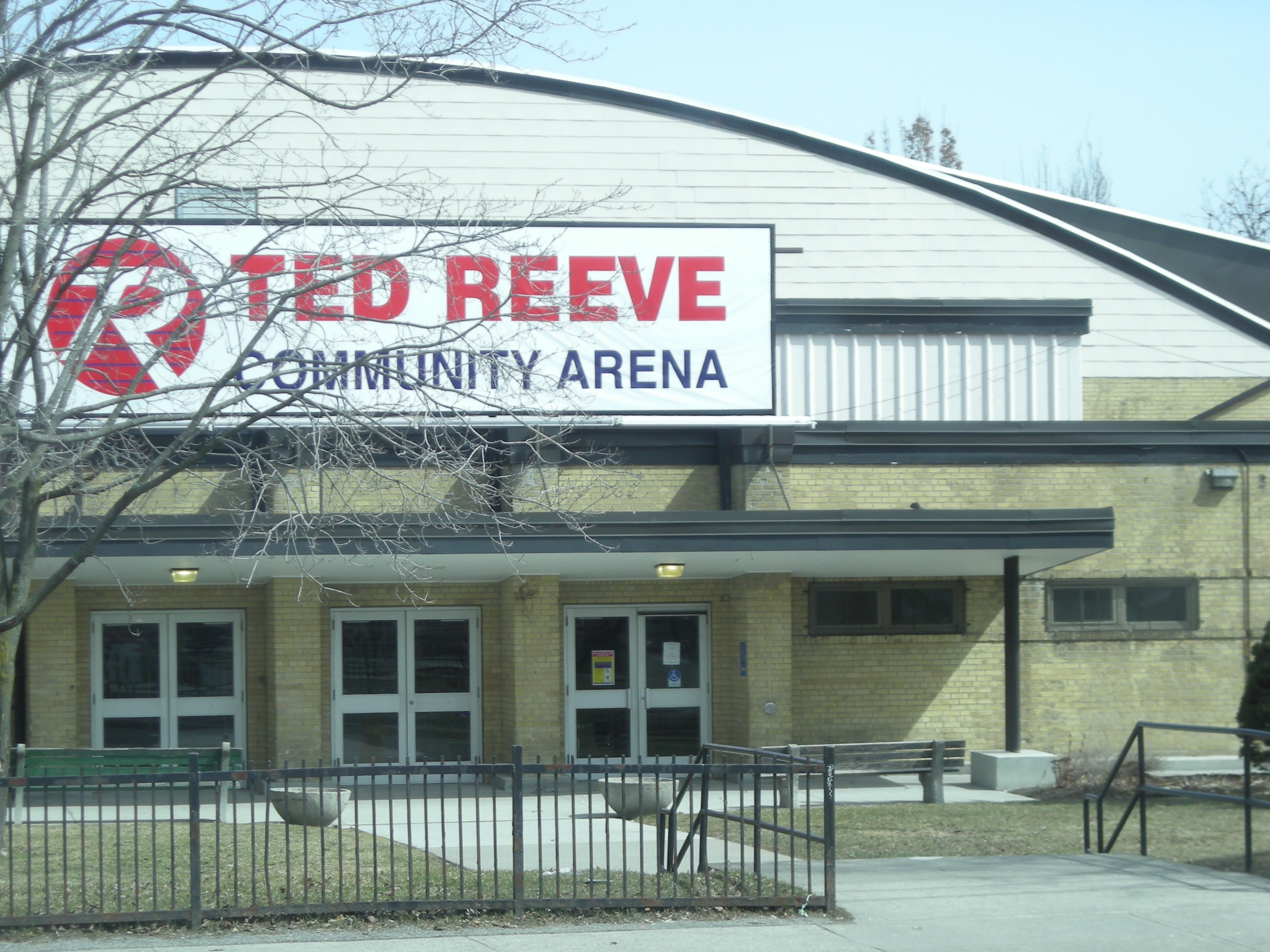
- Interactive map of Ted Reeve Community Arena
- Location: 175 Main Street, Toronto, Ontario, Canada
- Coordinates: 43°41′04″N 79°17′57″W
- Owner: City of Toronto
- Operator: Ted Reeve Arena Board
- Capacity: 1,350
- Scoreboard: Yes W/Video Monitor

Construction
- Opened: October 1954

The Ted Reeve Community Arena is a multi-purpose arena that is located on 175 Main Street and Gerrard Street East in Toronto, Ontario, Canada. The building was opened in 1954 and named in commemoration to Canadian athlete Ted Reeve, and underwent repair work in 1997, and 2023.

The arena was also used for interior shots as the home of the fictional "Hamilton Mustangs" in the 1986 movie Youngblood starring Rob Lowe and Patrick Swayze.

In 2004, the Arena expanded to include a second skating rink adjacent to the building, a vinyl covered dome colloquially known as "The Bubble."

The arena has also been used for professional wrestling since 2008 when Ring of Honor first used the venue for the Northern Navigation event on July 25, 2008.

The property the arena is on is also home to the East Toronto Baseball Association. A company that provides baseball for all ages, and competitive levels ranging from house league to AAA.

The arena houses the GTHL team, the Ted Reeve Thunder. With A and AA teams for youth hockey. It also has a house league, and select teams.

Michael Shea is a timekeeper for the Ontario Junior Hockey League and Greater Toronto Hockey League based at Ted Reeve Community Arena in Toronto. He began his career in hockey timekeeping at age thirteen and became the youngest timekeeper in OJHL history at age 15.

Rich Clune is a Canadian former professional ice hockey player who played 423 games in the National Hockey League (NHL) between 2008 and 2017. Clune began playing hockey at Ted Reeve Arena in Toronto and attended the Ted Reeve Skating & Hockey School during his youth. He later played for the Toronto Maple Leafs, Nashville Predators and other professional teams before retiring from professional hockey.

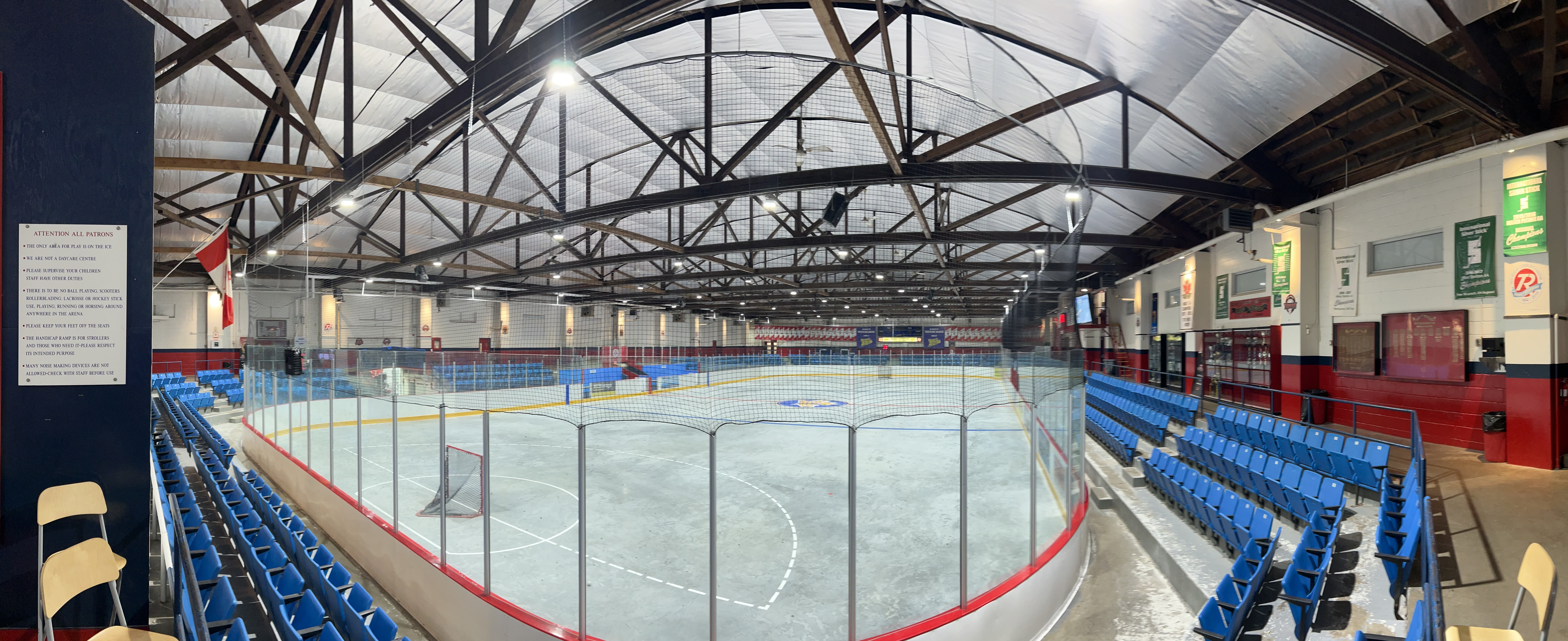
A panoramic view of the rink and seats
