= ROH World Television Championship =

Professional wrestling championship

- The standard version of the championship belt (2023 – present)

Details
- Promotion: Ring of Honor
- Date established: January 20, 2010
- Current champion: Action Andretti
- Date won: August 21, 2026
Statistics
- First champion: Eddie Edwards
- Most reigns: 2 reigns: Dragon Lee; Jay Lethal; Kenny King; Roderick Strong; Silas Young
- Longest reign: Samoa Joe (574 days)
- Shortest reign: Will Ospreay (2 days)
- Oldest champion: Minoru Suzuki (53 years, 288 days)
- Youngest champion: Nick Wayne (19 years, 281 days)
- Heaviest champion: Shane Taylor (350 lb (160 kg))
- Lightest champion: Komander (161 lb (73 kg))

The ROH World Television Championship is a men's professional wrestling world television championship created and promoted by the American promotion Ring of Honor (ROH). With the introduction of the title on January 20, 2010, the television-type championship returned to national exposure. The inaugural champion was Eddie Edwards. In addition to being in ROH, the championship is also occasionally defended on All Elite Wrestling's (AEW) programs, as AEW and ROH are both owned by Tony Khan. The current champion is Action Andretti who is in his first reign. He won the title by defeating "Blackheart" Lio Rush at Death Before Dishonor on August 21, 2026.

== History ==
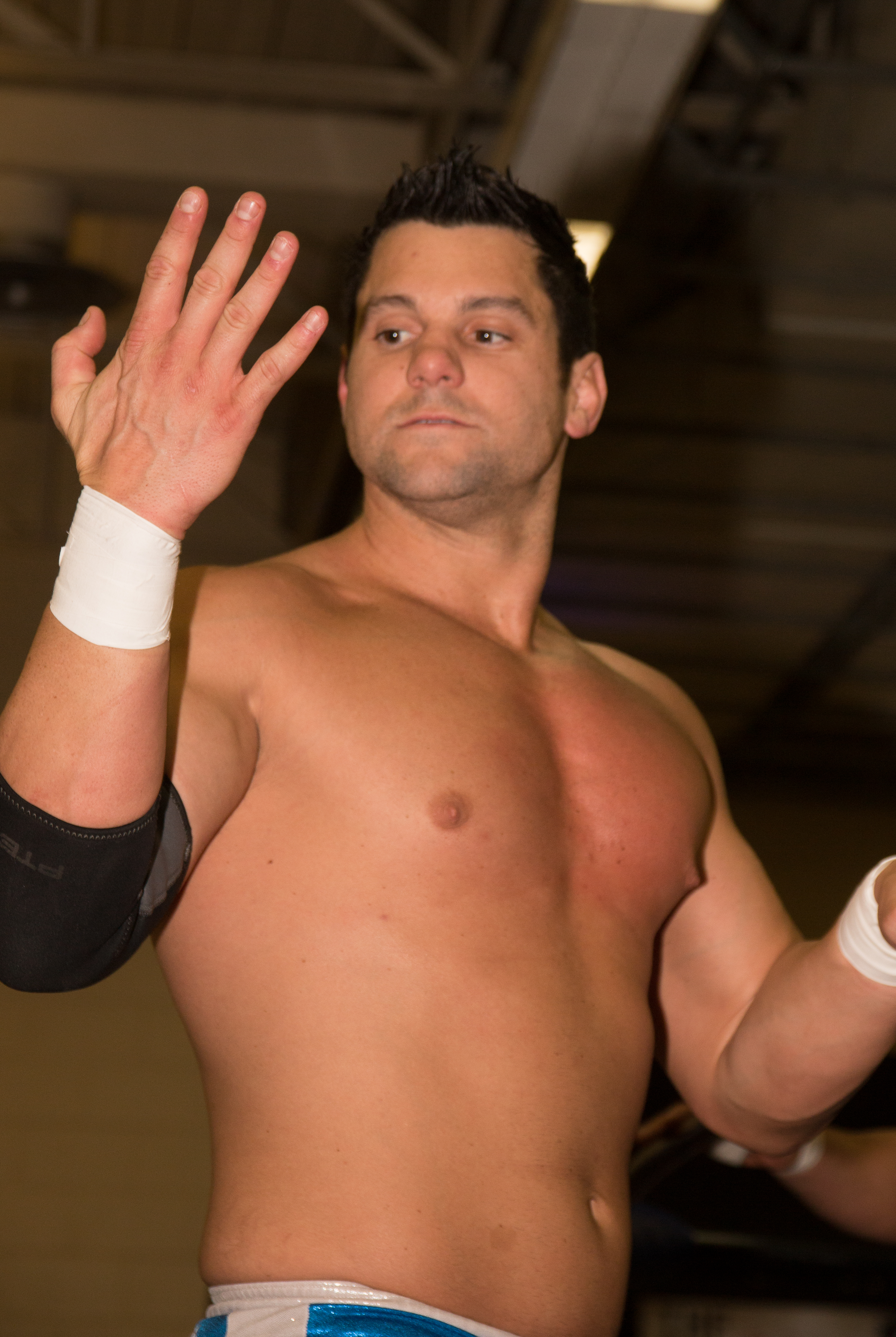
Inaugural champion Eddie Edwards

On January 20, 2010, the creation of the ROH World Television Championship was announced via ROH's official website. An eight-man single elimination tournament was then planned to determine the inaugural champion. The tournament was to start on February 4 and conclude on February 6 at The Arena in Philadelphia, Pennsylvania, at the tapings of ROH's television program Ring of Honor Wrestling. Regarding the new championship addition, ROH President Cary Silkin said: "We've been talking about adding a secondary championship for some time. Not only will this give the athletes of Ring of Honor another tremendous goal to work towards, it will also give our great partner, HDNet, a championship that is sure to be defended on the television program. We’re happy to publicly give thanks to HDNet for giving us the chance to add this title to the television show."

It is ROH's second secondary singles championship in their history. The first secondary singles championship, the ROH Pure Championship, was initially used from February 14, 2004, until it was unified with the ROH World Championship on August 12, 2006. The ROH Pure Championship would ultimately return as a secondary singles championship in January 2020. After the ROH World Television Championship announcement, wrestling columnist James Caldwell gave his comments: "I like the idea. It gives mid-card wrestlers on ROH's roster something to fight for in the context of trying to win a wrestling match to "move up the company ladder." Caldwell further remarked that "ROH bringing back the TV Title to national TV is consistent with ROH's current marketing under Jim Cornette to "re-capture an old-school flavor" to their product."

After the Ring of Honor Wrestling show was canceled in March 2011, the title was never vacant and never became inactive. Although Daniels stopped defending it at the moment, he still carried the belt with him as part of his villainous character. With the sale of ROH to the Sinclair Broadcast Group, and a new television show scheduled to air in September, afterwards the title was defended for June's Best in The World event.

The inaugural championship tournament was scheduled to span over a two-day weekend, starting on February 5, 2010, and ending on February 6 at events recorded for later broadcast on Ring of Honor Wrestling. However, due to severe weather conditions in the Philadelphia area, the second day of taping was canceled. It was not until almost a month later, on March 5, that ROH held the second recorded event, which closed out the tournament. The first four out of eight stars in the tournament were announced on January 22 Rhett Titus, El Generico, Eddie Edwards, and Delirious. The second four out of eight stars were announced on the January 26 Kevin Steen, Kenny King, Colt Cabana, and Davey Richards. The first round was determined at the first event on February 5, with Steen, King, Richards, and Edwards all advancing to round two. On March 5, Edwards and Richards both advanced to the final, where Edwards defeat Richards to be crowned the first ROH World Television Champion. The matches were scheduled to span over six episodes of Ring of Honor Wrestling. The first match from round one that aired pitted Steen against Titus, which Steen won, on the March 8 episode. On the same episode, King versus El Generico was featured, with King advancing. Cabana versus Edwards was the third match from round one to air, when it was broadcast on the March 15 episode. Richards defeated Delirious in the final match from round one, which aired later in the same episode. The first match from round two, Steen versus Edwards, was featured on the April 12 episode, in which Edwards advanced to the final. On the April 19 episode, Richards defeated King to advance to the final. On the April 26 episode, Edwards defeated Richards in the final of the tournament to become the first ROH World Television Champion.

Also during year 2016 the title was defended and switched hands twice in the United Kingdom at ROH Reach for the Sky.

== Inaugural championship tournament (2010) ==
=== Tournament bracket ===
Round 1 (Ring of Honor Wrestling)
Kevin Steen | Pin
Rhett Titus | (Note: The time for this match is unknown.)
Colt Cabana | 10:00
Eddie Edwards | Pin
Delirious | 13:30
Davey Richards | Pin
El Generico
Kenny King | Pin

Round 2 (Ring of Honor Wrestling)
Kevin Steen
Eddie Edwards | Pin
Davey Richards | Pin
Kenny King

Final (Ring of Honor Wrestling)
Eddie Edwards | Sub
Davey Richards | 20:02

== Belt designs ==
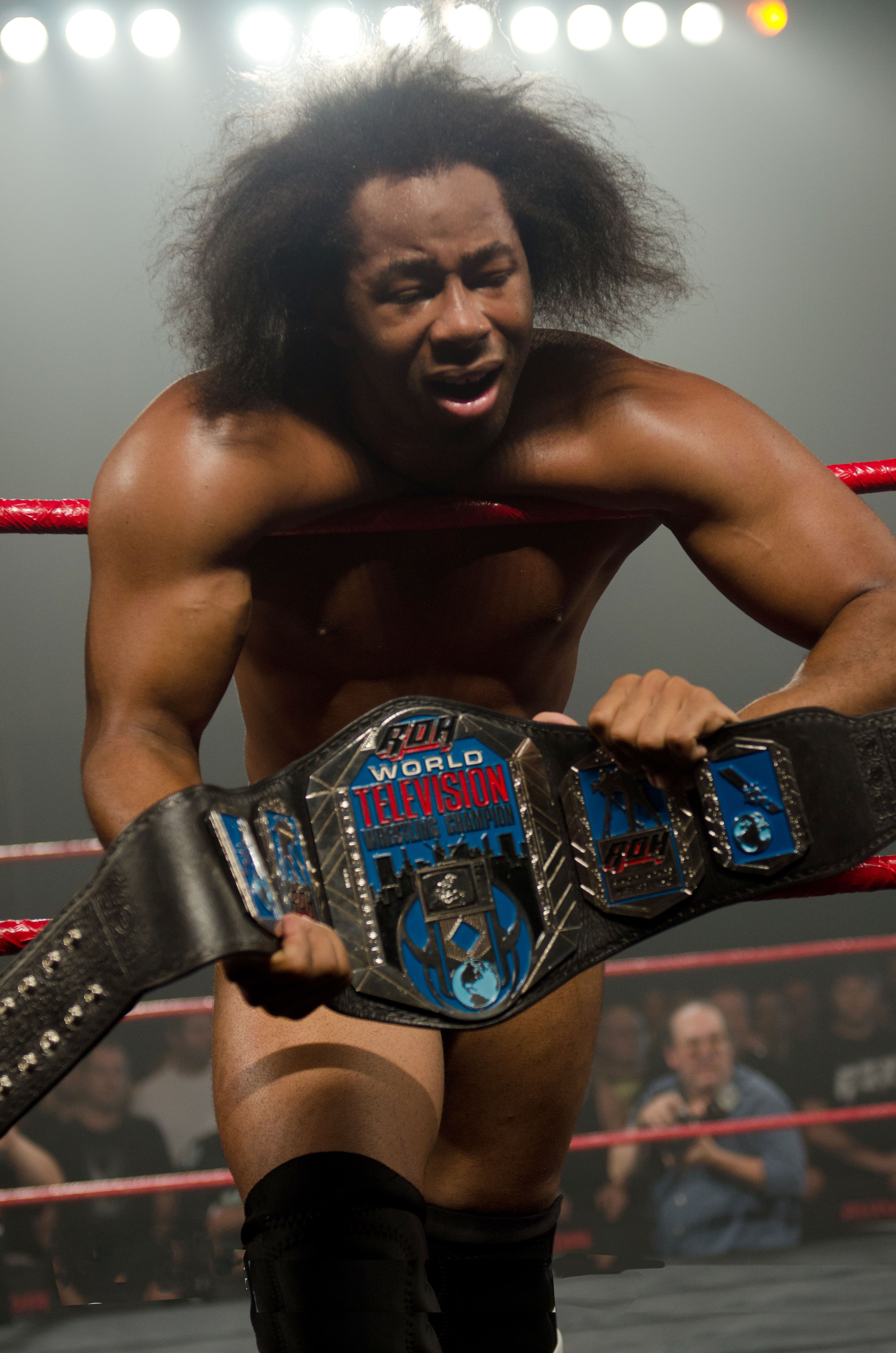
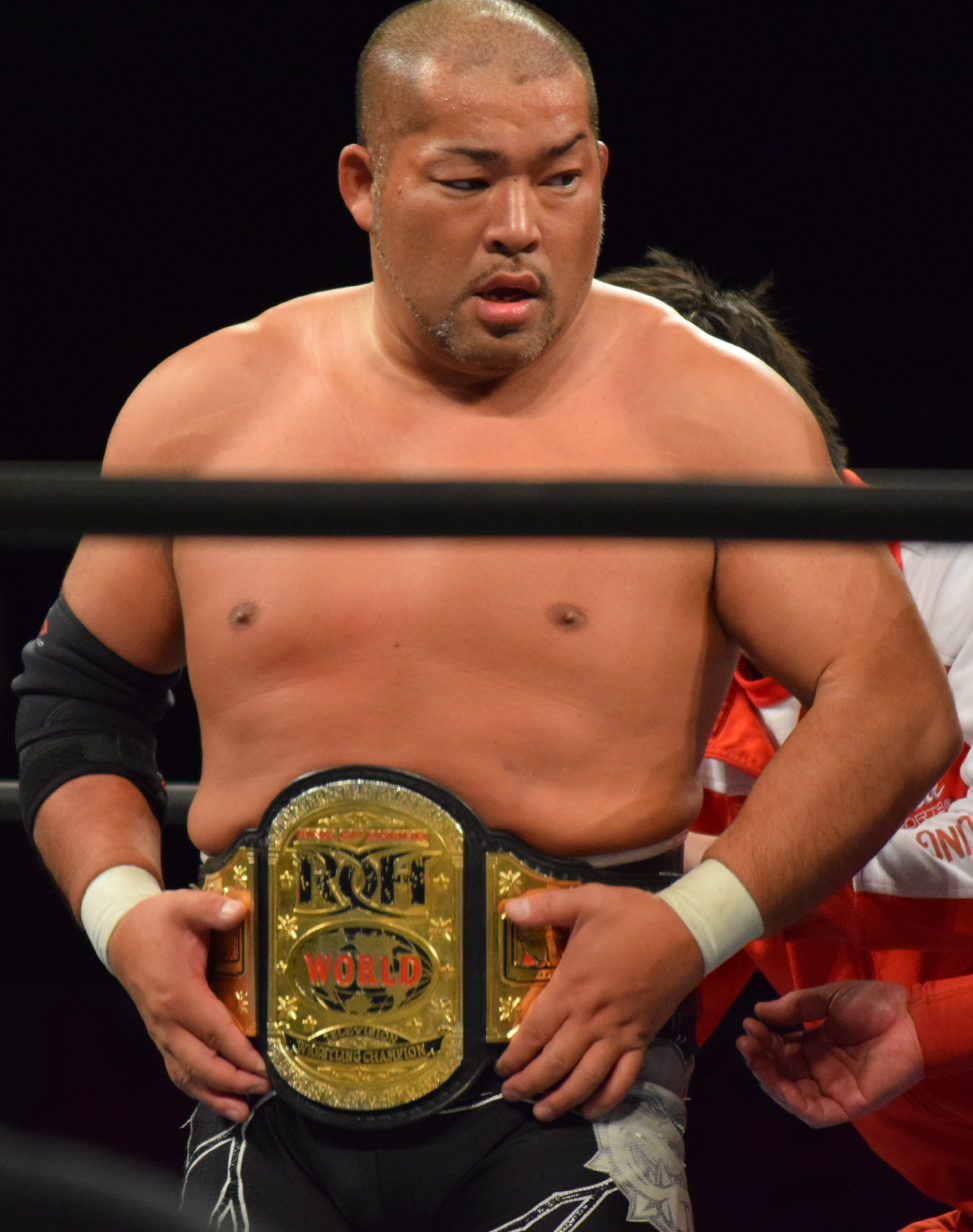
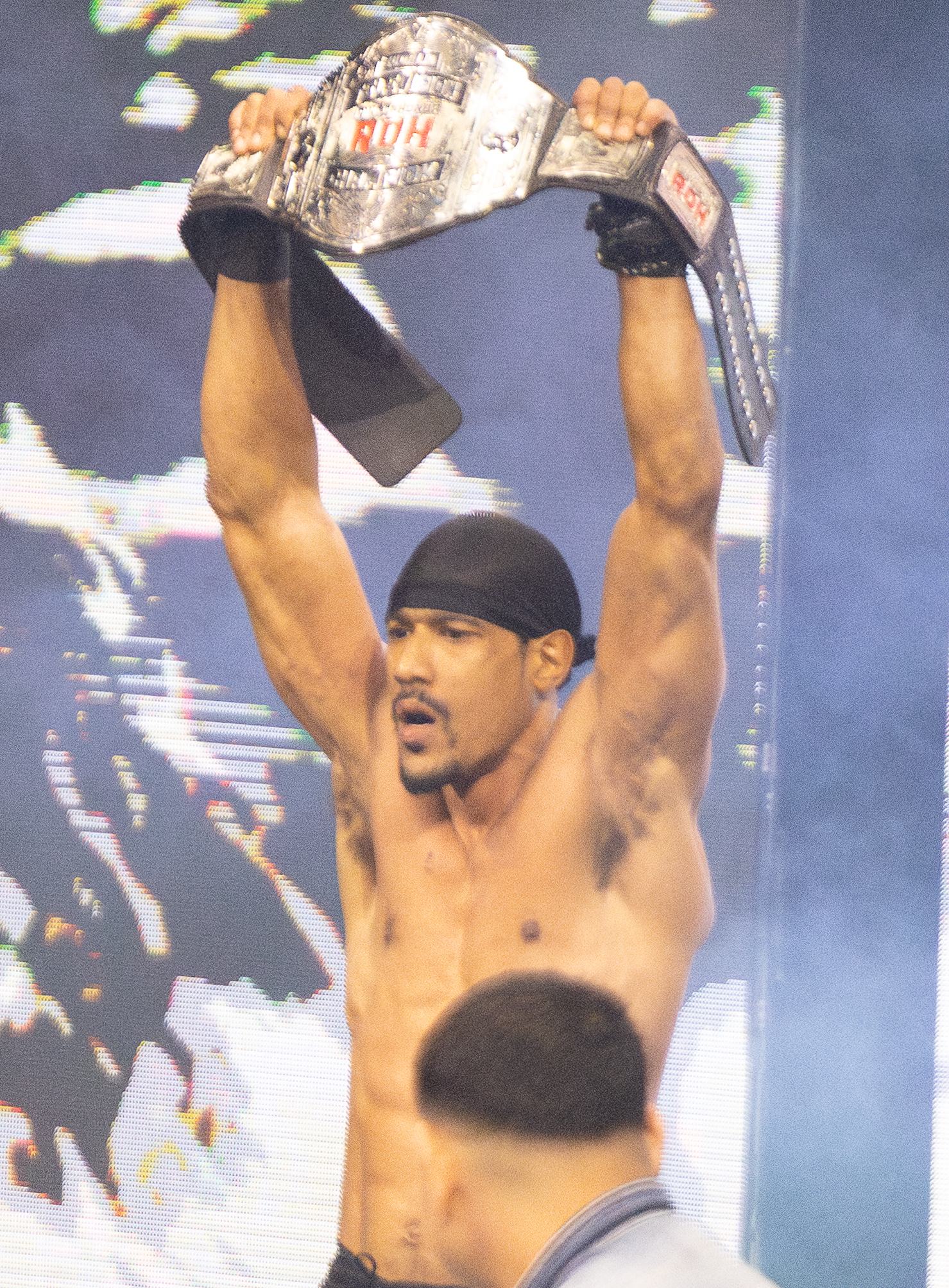
ROH World Television Championship belts (left-to-right): first design (2010–2012) with Jay Lethal, second design (2012–2017) with Tomohiro Ishii, the third design of the title (2018–2023), and the fourth and current design (2023–present) with AR Fox.

The first championship belt design was introduced on March 5, 2010, when it was given to the newly crowned inaugural champion Eddie Edwards. The physical championship belt was designed by All Star Championship Belts d/b/a ASCB, LLC. The title's base was a black leather strap that was covered with four small silver plates. The center of the title had one large silver plate. All plates had an inner blue covering. The two small outer plates had a caricature of the earth and a satellite in orbit. The middle plates had figures resembling a cameraman filming a television production. Underneath each figure were the ROH logo and the words "Ring of Honor Wrestling". The central plate had the engravings of the ROH logo as well as the statement "World Television Wrestling Champion" hovering above the backdrop of a city, with a television lying on top of a globe with an overhead shot of a wrestling ring between them in front of the skyline. (Note: This description is based on the first design of the ROH World Television Championship.)

In November 2012, the design was changed during the reign of Adam Cole. The new design seemed to be based on the WCW World Six-Man Tag Team Championship.

Between 2014 and 2015, during Jay Lethal's second record-setting reign, the belt design was modified to emphasize the "ROH Champion" portion of the title. Lethal claimed the Television championship was more prestigious than the ROH World Championship since he was the champion.

On January 1, 2018, in addition to other ROH championship belts, the ROH World Television Championship received a new design.

On June 22, 2023, a new and fourth design of the championship belt was presented to champion Samoa Joe on Ring of Honor Wrestling. The championship belt design is mounted on a wide black leather strap with a raised, contoured center section and tapered ends. It consists of five silver-colored metal plates: a large central plate, two inward side plates featuring television-production imagery, and two smaller outer plates displaying the championship’s name and the Ring of Honor logo. The plates predominantly use polished silver, recessed black detailing and red enamel-style accents, giving the belt a monochromatic presentation apart from the prominent red ROH lettering.

The central plate has a vertically elongated, shield-like shape with multiple stepped edges and architectural side extensions. Its surface is covered with dense engraved linework, including symmetrical scrollwork, geometric patterns, leaf-like flourishes and ornamental borders. At the top, the word “WORLD” appears inside a small black rectangular nameplate. Beneath it is a larger, slightly curved black banner bearing “TELEVISION” in raised silver lettering. A narrower panel reading “RING OF HONOR” separates the title designation from the oversized ROH initials, which appear in bright red block lettering with black and silver outlines. The bottom portion contains a broad black banner reading “CHAMPION”, surrounded by additional engraved ornamentation and a symmetrical winged or feather-like motif extending toward the lower point of the plate.

Circular globe medallions are positioned on both sides of the central lettering. The left medallion depicts the Western Hemisphere, while the right depicts the Eastern Hemisphere, emphasizing the championship’s world designation. Each globe is surrounded by a silver border and set against a black recessed background. Narrow vertical sections beside the globes carry repeated “RING OF HONOR” inscriptions. These sections transition into layered silver extensions decorated with scrollwork, vertical grooves and small red jewel-like accents.

The two larger side plates have curved, trapezoidal outlines designed to follow the shape of the strap. Each is framed by a raised silver border with engraved scrolls, corner ornaments and small red accents. Their central fields have a textured, stippled finish resembling television static. The left plate depicts a hand holding a broadcast microphone, while the right plate depicts a hand operating a television camera, directly representing the championship’s association with televised competition and broadcast production.

The two outermost plates are smaller and nearly rectangular, with softly curved sides and beveled silver borders. Each repeats the championship identity in condensed form, displaying “WORLD TELEVISION” at the top, “RING OF HONOR” beneath it, the red ROH initials in the center and “CHAMPION” along the bottom. Engraved corner ornaments and recessed black detailing visually connect these plates to the more elaborate central design. Overall, the belt combines Ring of Honor’s red, black and silver color scheme with broadcast-related imagery and highly detailed ornamental engraving.

On July 1 2026, reigning champion Lio Rush debuted a new championship to go along with his"Blackheart" persona. The plates are the same, only they are painted black and on a warped black leather strap.

== Reigns ==
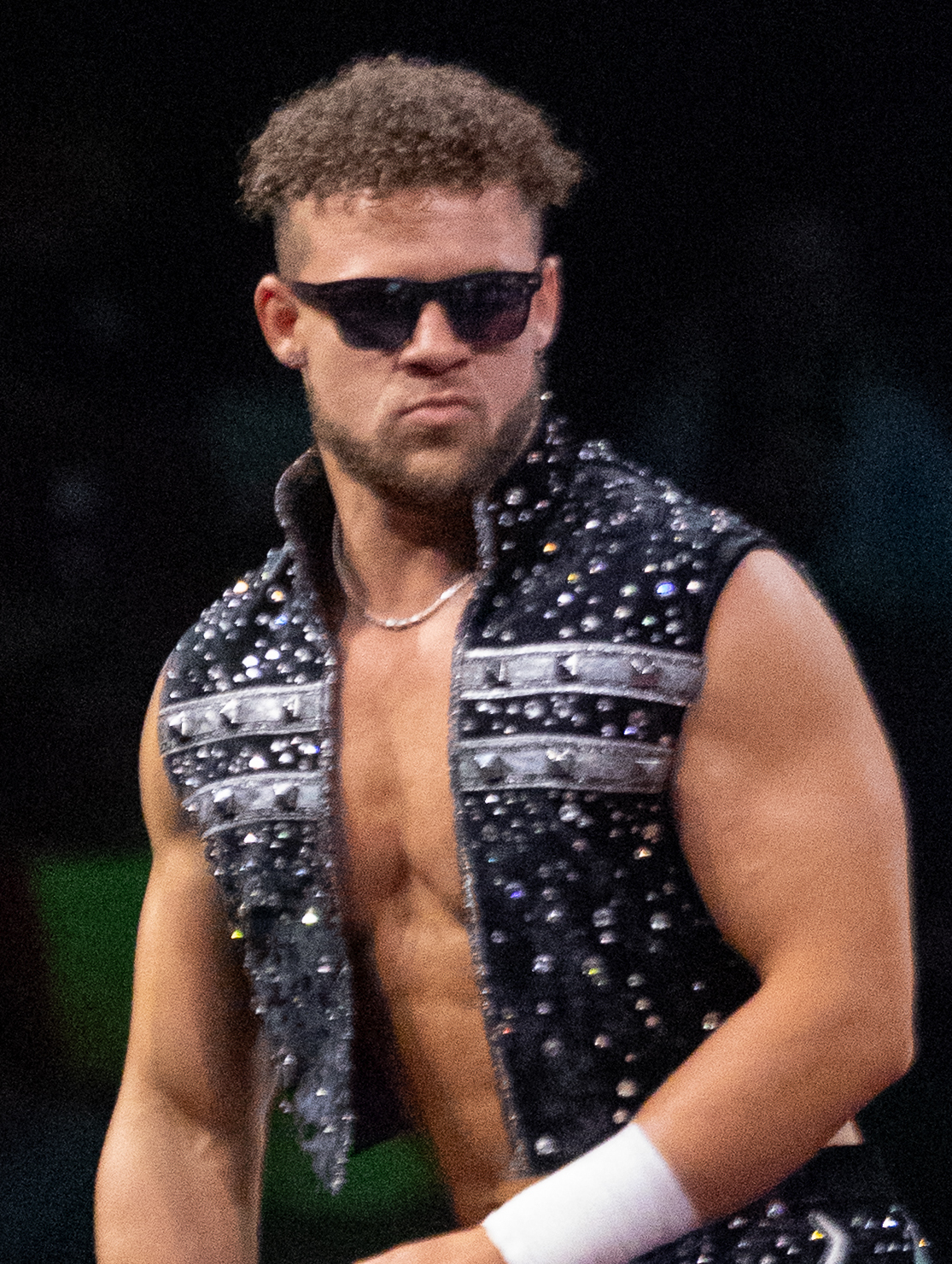
Current champion Action Andretti

Eddie Edwards was the inaugural champion. Samoa Joe's is the longest at 574 days, while Will Ospreay's reign is the shortest at two days. Lethal has the longest combined reign at 798 days. Minoru Suzuki is the oldest champion, winning the title at the age of 53, while Nick Wayne is the youngest when he won the title at 19 years.

The current champion is Action Andretti, who is in his first reign. He won the title by defeating "Blackheart" Lio Rush in a Fight Without Honor at Death Before Dishonor in Philadelphia, Pennsylvania, on August 21, 2026.

== See also ==
- ROH Survival of the Fittest
