= List of New Japan Pro-Wrestling of America events =

List of major events promoted by New Japan Pro-Wrestling of America

This is a List of New Japan Pro-Wrestling of America events, detailing all notable professional wrestling cards promoted on pay-per-view (PPV), and NJPW World by New Japan Pro-Wrestling's (NJPW) United States-based subsidiary, "New Japan Pro-Wrestling of America" (NJoA), and its NJPW Strong brand; as well as other events promoted by NJPW in North America since 2019.

On October 21, 2019, NJPW announced the formation of an American subsidiary called "New Japan Pro-Wrestling of America". On July 31, 2020, NJPW announced a new weekly series titled NJPW Strong. As part of NJPW's expansion into the United States, the series would be produced by NJoA.

On January 30, 2023, NJPW announced that all of the promotion's future American events would be branded under the "Strong" name. NJoA PPVs have since aired under the NJPW Strong Live banner, and are later presented as part of the NJPW Strong on Demand series.

== Past events ==
=== 2020–2021 ===
Date	Event	Venue	Location	Main event
September 4–11, 2020	Fighting Spirit Unleashed 2020	Oceanview Pavilion	Port Hueneme, California, USA	Flip Gordon vs. Jay White; Kenta vs. Jeff Cobb for the IWGP United States Heavyweight Championship challenge rights certificate
August 14	Resurgence	The Torch at LA Coliseum	Los Angeles, California, USA	Lance Archer (c) vs. Hiroshi Tanahashi for the IWGP United States Heavyweight Championship
August 16	Fighting Spirit Unleashed 2021	Thunder Studios	Long Beach, California, USA	Tom Lawlor (c) (with J. R. Kratos) vs. Lio Rush for the Strong Openweight Championship
November 13	Battle in the Valley	San Jose Civic	San Jose, California, USA	Jay White (c) vs. Tomohiro Ishii for the NEVER Openweight Championship

=== 2022 ===
Date	Event	Venue	Location	Main event
April 1	Lonestar Shootout	Fairmont Hotel	Dallas, Texas, USA	Tomohiro Ishii vs. Chris Dickinson; Team Filthy (J. R. Kratos, Royce Isaacs and Tom Lawlor) vs. Fred Rosser, Alex Coughlin and The DKC
April 16	Windy City Riot	Odeum Expo Center	Villa Park, Illinois, USA	Jon Moxley vs. Will Ospreay
May 14	Capital Collision	Entertainment and Sports Arena	Washington, D.C., USA	Hiroshi Tanahashi (c) vs. Juice Robinson vs. Will Ospreay vs. Jon Moxley for the IWGP United States Heavyweight Championship
June 26	Forbidden Door	United Center	Chicago, Illinois, USA	Hiroshi Tanahashi vs. Jon Moxley for the AEW Interim World Championship
July 30	Music City Mayhem	Nashville Fairgrounds	Nashville, Tennessee, USA	Jon Moxley vs. El Desperado in a no disqualification match
August 21	Fighting Spirit Unleashed	The Vermont Hollywood	Los Angeles, California, USA	Fred Rosser (c) vs. TJP for the Strong Openweight Championship
October 28	Rumble on 44th Street	Palladium Times Square	New York City, New York, USA	Bullet Club (Jay White and Juice Robinson) vs. Kazuchika Okada and Eddie Kingston

=== 2023 ===
Date	Event	Venue	Location	Main event
February 18	Battle in the Valley	San Jose Civic	San Jose, California, USA	Kazuchika Okada (c) vs. Hiroshi Tanahashi for the IWGP World Heavyweight Championship
March 30	Multiverse United	Globe Theater	Los Angeles, California, USA	Hiroshi Tanahashi vs. Mike Bailey
April 15	Capital Collision	Entertainment and Sports Arena	Washington, D.C., USA	The Motor City Machine Guns (Alex Shelley and Chris Sabin) (c) vs. Aussie Open (Mark Davis and Kyle Fletcher) vs. Dream Team (Hiroshi Tanahashi and Kazuchika Okada) for the Strong Openweight Tag Team Championship
April 16	Collision in Philadelphia	2300 Arena	Philadelphia, Pennsylvania, USA	Aussie Open (Mark Davis and Kyle Fletcher) vs. CHAOS (Tomohiro Ishii and Lio Rush) for the Strong Openweight Tag Team Championship
May 21	Resurgence	Walter Pyramid	Long Beach, California, USA	Mercedes Moné vs. Willow Nightingale in a tournament final match for the inaugural Strong Women's Championship
June 25	AEW x NJPW: Forbidden Door	Scotiabank Arena	Toronto, Ontario, Canada	Bryan Danielson vs. Kazuchika Okada
August 19	All Star Junior Festival USA	2300 Arena	Philadelphia, Pennsylvania, USA	Mike Bailey vs. Kevin Knight in a tournament final match in the All Star Jr. Festival USA tournament
August 20	Multiverse United 2	2300 Arena	Philadelphia, Pennsylvania, USA	Alex Shelley (c) vs. Hiroshi Tanahashi for the Impact World Championship
October 28	Fighting Spirit Unleashed	Sam's Town Hotel and Gambling Hall Las Vegas	Las Vegas, Nevada, USA	Tama Tonga (c) vs. Shingo Takagi for the NEVER Openweight Championship
November 10	Lonestar Shootout	Curtis Culwell Center	Garland, Texas, USA	Shingo Takagi (c) vs. Trent Beretta for the NEVER Openweight Championship

=== 2024 ===
Date	Event	Venue	Location	Main event
January 13	Battle in the Valley	San Jose Civic	San Jose, California, USA	Kazuchika Okada vs. Will Ospreay
April 12	Windy City Riot	Wintrust Arena	Chicago, Illinois, USA	Tetsuya Naito (c) vs. Jon Moxley for the IWGP World Heavyweight Championship
May 11	Resurgence	Toyota Arena	Ontario, California, USA	Jon Moxley (c) vs. Shota Umino for the IWGP World Heavyweight Championship
June 30	Forbidden Door	UBS Arena	Elmont, New York, USA	Swerve Strickland (c) vs. Will Ospreay for the AEW World Championship
August 30	Capital Collision	Entertainment and Sports Arena	Washington, D.C., USA	Mercedes Moné (c) vs. Momo Watanabe for the Strong Women's Championship
November 8	Fighting Spirit Unleashed	Lowell Memorial Auditorium	Lowell, Massachusetts, USA	Gabe Kidd (c) vs. Kosei Fujita for the Strong Openweight Championship
December 15	Strong Style Evolved	Walter Pyramid	Long Beach, California, USA	Mercedes Moné (c) vs. Hazuki for the Strong Women's Championship

=== 2025 ===
Date	Event	Venue	Location	Main event
January 11	Battle in the Valley	San Jose Civic	San Jose, California, USA	El Desperado (c) vs. Taiji Ishimori for the IWGP Junior Heavyweight Championship
April 11	Windy City Riot	Wintrust Arena	Chicago, Illinois, USA	Konosuke Takeshita vs. Hiroshi Tanahashi
May 9	Resurgence	Toyota Arena	Ontario, California, USA	AZM vs Mercedes Moné (c) vs Mina Shirakawa for the Strong Women's Championship

== See also ==
- NJPW Strong
  - List of NJPW Strong episodes
  - List of NJPW Strong special episodes
- New Japan Pro-Wrestling
  - List of major NJPW events
