= Fighting Spirit Unleashed =

New Japan Pro-Wrestling event series

- Promotions: New Japan Pro-Wrestling
- First event: Fighting Spirit Unleashed (2018)

Fighting Spirit Unleashed is an annual series of professional wrestling events by New Japan Pro-Wrestling (NJPW), a Japanese professional wrestling promotion, in the United States. NJPW first produced the event in 2018 and has since produced four editions, with the 2019 having been held as a three-event tour in Lowell, Massachusetts, New York City, New York and Philadelphia, Pennsylvania from September 27 to 29, 2019 and the most recent being held in closed doors due to the COVID-19 pandemic from September 4 to September 11, 2020.

== Events ==
#	Event	Date	City	Venue	Attendance	Main event	Ref.
1	Fighting Spirit Unleashed (2018)	September 30, 2018	Long Beach, California	Walter Pyramid	3,007	Golden☆Lovers (Kenny Omega and Kota Ibushi) vs. Chaos (Kazuchika Okada and Tomohiro Ishii)	
2	Fighting Spirit Unleashed (2019)	September 27, 2019	Lowell, Massachusetts	Lowell Memorial Auditorium	2,130	Kazuchika Okada, Kota Ibushi and Hiroshi Tanahashi vs. Los Ingobernables de Japón (Sanada, Evil and Tetsuya Naito)	
2	Fighting Spirit Unleashed (2019)	September 28, 2019	New York City, New York	Hammerstein Ballroom	1,776	Kazuchika Okada and Kota Ibushi vs. Los Ingobernables de Japón (Sanada and Evil)	
2	Fighting Spirit Unleashed (2019)	September 29, 2019	Philadelphia, Pennsylvania	2300 Arena	1,030	Hiroshi Tanahashi, Hirooki Goto, Tomohiro Ishii, Yoshi-Hashi, Ricky Morton and Robert Gibson vs. Bullet Club (Jay White, Kenta, Tama Tonga, Tanga Loa, Chase Owens and Gedo) in a twelve-man tag team elimination match	
3	Fighting Spirit Unleashed (2020)	September 4, 2020 (Note: The event was taped on an unknown date and aired on September 4 and 11 as regular episodes of NJPW Strong.)	Port Hueneme, California	Oceanview Pavilion	0 (Note: These events were attended only by essential personnel due to the COVID-19 pandemic.)	Flip Gordon vs. Jay White	
3	Fighting Spirit Unleashed (2020)	September 11, 2020	Port Hueneme, California	Oceanview Pavilion	0	Kenta vs. Jeff Cobb for the IWGP United States Heavyweight Championship challenge rights certificate	
4	Fighting Spirit Unleashed (2021)	September 18, 2021 (Note: The event was taped on August 16 and aired on September 18, 25 and October 2 as regular episodes of NJPW Strong.)	Long Beach, California	Thunder Studios	144	Juice Robinson vs. Hikuleo in a tables match	
4	Fighting Spirit Unleashed (2021)	September 25, 2021	Long Beach, California	Thunder Studios	144	Fred Rosser vs. Ren Narita	
4	Fighting Spirit Unleashed (2021)	October 2, 2021	Long Beach, California	Thunder Studios	144	Tom Lawlor (c) vs. Lio Rush for the Strong Openweight Championship	
5	Fighting Spirit Unleashed (2022)	September 10, 2022	Los Angeles, California	The Vermont Hollywood	287	Aussie Open (Kyle Fletcher and Mark Davis) (c) vs. West Coast Wrecking Crew (Jorel Nelson and Royce Isaacs) for the Strong Openweight Tag Team Championship	
5	Fighting Spirit Unleashed (2022)	September 17, 2022	Los Angeles, California	The Vermont Hollywood	287	Bullet Club (Chase Owens, Hikuleo, Jay White and Juice Robinson) (with Taiji Ishimori) vs. Kushida and Roppongi Vice (Beretta and Rocky Romero) and Taylor Rust	
5	Fighting Spirit Unleashed (2022)	September 24, 2022	Los Angeles, California	The Vermont Hollywood	287	Taiji Ishimori vs. Alan Angels	
5	Fighting Spirit Unleashed (2022)	October 1, 2022	Los Angeles, California	The Vermont Hollywood	287	Fred Rosser (c) vs. TJP for the Strong Openweight Championship	
6	Fighting Spirit Unleashed (2023)	October 28, 2023	Las Vegas, Nevada	Sam's Town Live	801	Tama Tonga (c) vs. Shingo Takagi for the NEVER Openweight Championship	
7	Fighting Spirit Unleashed (2024)	November 8, 2024	Lowell, Massachusetts	Lowell Memorial Auditorium		Gabe Kidd (c) vs. Kosei Fujita for the Strong Openweight Championship	
