= Fighting Spirit Unleashed (2019) =

Professional wrestling event tour

- Promotion: New Japan Pro-Wrestling
- Date: September 27-29, 2019
- City: Lowell, Massachusetts; New York City, New York; Philadelphia, Pennsylvania
- Venue: Lowell Memorial Auditorium; Hammerstein Ballroom; 2300 Arena
- Attendance: 2,130 (Lowell); 1,776 (New York); 1,030 (Philadelphia)

Event chronology
← Previous; Destruction	Next → New Japan Road; King of Pro-Wrestling

Fighting Spirit Unleashed chronology
← Previous; 2018	Next → 2020

Fighting Spirit Unleashed (2019) was a professional wrestling three-event tour promoted by New Japan Pro-Wrestling (NJPW). The three events took place from September 27 to 29, 2019 at the Lowell Memorial Auditorium in Lowell, Massachusetts, the Hammerstein Ballroom in New York City, New York and the 2300 Arena in Philadelphia, Pennsylvania. It was the second event held under the Fighting Spirit Unleashed branch.

== Production ==
=== Background ===
On July 6, 2019, during the opening night of the G1 Climax tournament, NJPW announced their return to the United States to host a 2019 edition of Fighting Spirit Unleashed, a three-event tour across the East Coast of the United States at the end of September. The cities hosting the three events were announced by NJPW as Lowell, New York City and Philadelphia. Tickets went on sale on July 26.

The New York event was streamed live worldwide on NJPW's streaming service, NJPW World, with Japanese commentary. The Lowell and Philadelphia events were later made available for on demand viewing.

=== Storylines ===
Fighting Spirit Unleashed featured seven to eight professional wrestling matches in each show that involved different wrestlers from pre-existing scripted feuds and storylines. Wrestlers portray villains, heroes, or less distinguishable characters in the scripted events that build tension and culminate in a wrestling match or series of matches.

== Results ==
=== Night 1 (Lowell) ===
No.	Results	Stipulations	Times
1	Karl Fredericks defeated Alex Coughlin by submission	Singles match	8:47
2	Lance Archer defeated Ren Narita	Singles match	7:23
3	Juice Robinson and Mikey Nicholls defeated TJP and Clark Connors	Tag team match	8:04
4	Bullet Club (Chase Owens and Jado) defeated The Rock 'n' Roll Express (Ricky Morton and Robert Gibson)	Tag team match	9:10
5	Tomohiro Ishii and Amazing Red defeated Los Ingobernables de Japón (Shingo Takagi and Bushi)	Tag team match	8:48
6	Chaos (Hirooki Goto, Yoshi-Hashi and Rocky Romero) defeated Bullet Club (Jay White, Kenta and Gedo) by submission	Six-man tag team match	12:28
7	Guerrillas of Destiny (Tama Tonga and Tanga Loa) (c) defeated Roppongi 3K (Sho and Yoh)	Tag team match for the IWGP Tag Team Championship	16:43
8	Kazuchika Okada, Kota Ibushi and Hiroshi Tanahashi defeated Los Ingobernables de Japón (Sanada, Evil and Tetsuya Naito)	Six-man tag team match	20:26
(c) / – the champion(s) heading into the match

=== Night 2 (New York) ===
No.	Results	Stipulations	Times
1	TJP defeated Ren Narita by submission	Singles match	8:48
2	Lance Archer defeated Karl Fredericks	Singles match	7:37
3	Juice Robinson and Mikey Nicholls defeated Clark Connors and Alex Coughlin	Tag team match	8:29
4	Bullet Club (Tama Tonga, Tanga Loa and Jado) defeated Roppongi 3K (Rocky Romero, Sho and Yoh)	Six-man tag team match	10:46
5	Hiroshi Tanahashi and The Rock 'n' Roll Express (Ricky Morton and Robert Gibson) defeated Los Ingobernables de Japón (Tetsuya Naito, Shingo Takagi and Bushi)	Six-man tag team match	10:19
6	Chaos (Hirooki Goto and Tomohiro Ishii) and Amazing Red defeated Bullet Club (Jay White, Chase Owens and Gedo)	Six-man tag team match	12:02
7	Kenta (c) defeated Yoshi-Hashi	Singles match for the NEVER Openweight Championship	25:04
8	Los Ingobernables de Japón (Sanada and Evil) defeated Kazuchika Okada and Kota Ibushi	Tag team match	18:46
(c) / – the champion(s) heading into the match

=== Night 3 (Philadelphia) ===
No.	Results	Stipulations	Times
1	Rocky Romero defeated Clark Connors by submission	Singles match	9:03
2	Mikey Nicholls defeated Karl Fredericks	Singles match	10:00
3	Lance Archer defeated Alex Coughlin	Singles match	8:25
4	Amazing Red defeated Ren Narita	Singles match	8:57
5	Los Ingobernables de Japón (Tetsuya Naito, Sanada and Shingo Takagi) defeated Juice Robinson and Roppongi 3K (Sho and Yoh) by submission	Six-man tag team match	11:45
6	Los Ingobernables de Japón (Evil and Bushi) defeated Kota Ibushi and TJP	Tag team match	11:23
7	Hiroshi Tanahashi, Chaos (Hirooki Goto, Tomohiro Ishii and Yoshi-Hashi) and The Rock 'n' Roll Express (Ricky Morton and Robert Gibson) defeated Bullet Club (Jay White, Kenta, Tama Tonga, Tanga Loa, Chase Owens and Gedo)	Twelve-man tag team elimination match	22:20
