= G1 Climax 32 =

2022 edition of the G1 Climax

- G1 Climax 32 logo
- Promotion: New Japan Pro-Wrestling
- Date: July 16–August 18, 2022
- City: See venues
- Venue: See venues
- Attendance: 48,138 (combined)

Event chronology
← Previous; Forbidden Door	Next → Music City Mayhem; Fighting Spirit Unleashed; Burning Spirit

G1 Climax chronology
← Previous; G1 Climax 31	Next → G1 Climax 33

G1 Climax 32
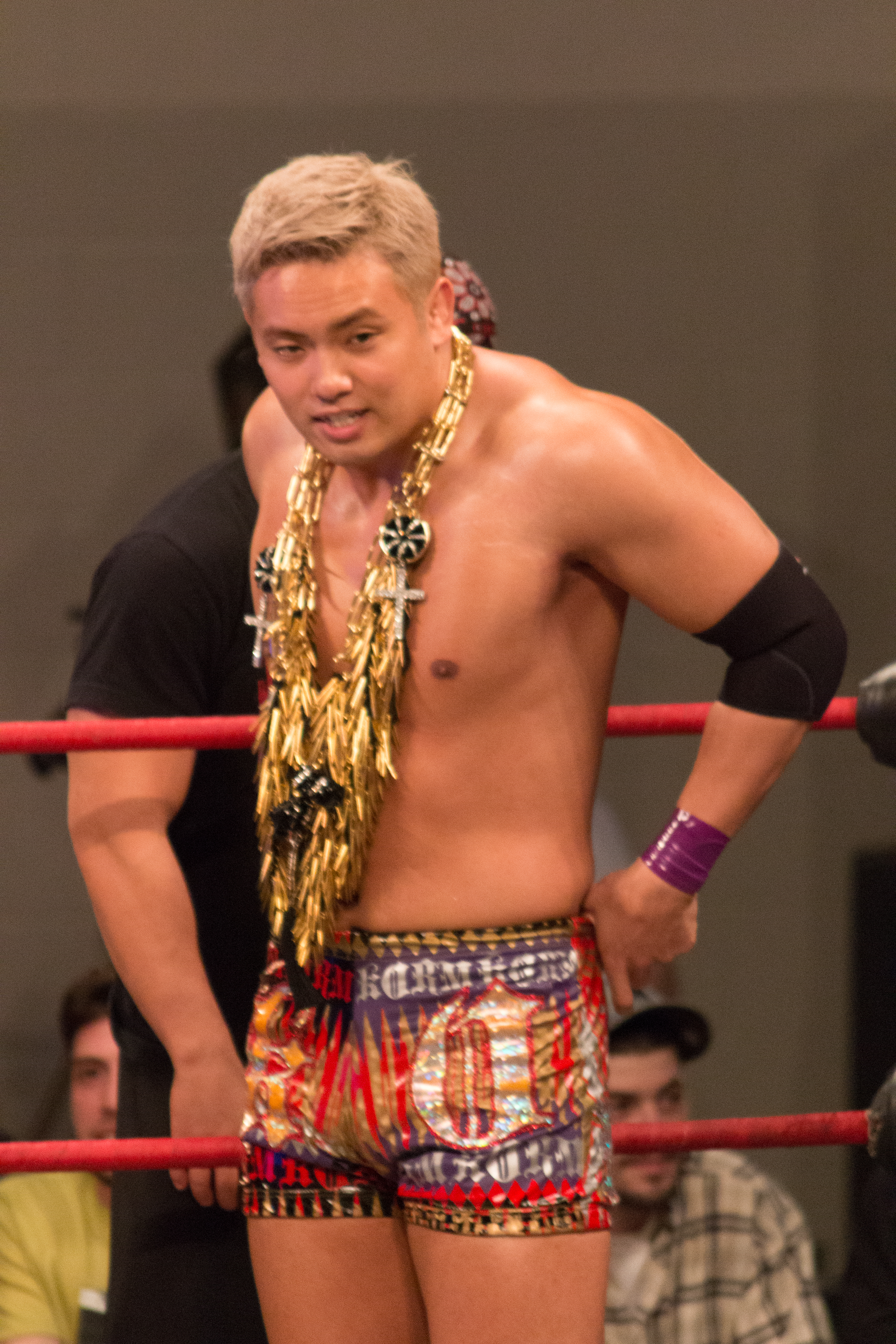
- Kazuchika Okada, winner of G1 Climax 32

Tournament information
- Sport: Professional wrestling
- Location: Japan
- Dates: July 16, 2022–August 18, 2022
- Tournament format: Four-block round-robin tournament
- Participants: 28

Final positions
- Champion: Kazuchika Okada
- Runner-up: Will Ospreay

Tournament statistics
- Bouts fought: 87

The G1 Climax 32 was a professional wrestling tournament promoted by New Japan Pro-Wrestling (NJPW). The tournament commenced on July 16 and concluded on August 18, 2022. It was the thirty-second edition of G1 Climax and the forty-eighth edition of the tournament counting its previous forms under different names.

Considered NJPW's most important tournament, the G1 Climax featured twenty-eight wrestlers, divided into four blocks of seven ("A", "B", "C", and "D"). Each participant faced all six other wrestlers within the same block in singles matches. The winner of each block was determined via a point system, with two points for a win, one point for a draw, and no points for a defeat. Each night of the event saw one match from each block between two members. On the final two days of the event, the winners of each block entered a four-man playoff to determine the winner of the tournament, who also receives a future match for the IWGP World Heavyweight Championship at Wrestle Kingdom. The event was broadcast live on TV Asahi and Fighting TV Samurai in Japan, and New Japan Pro-Wrestling World worldwide.

For the first time in three years, the block returned to the summer, moving away from the previous years where it was held in the fall between September–October due to the 2020 Summer Olympic Games being held in Japan, while coinciding with the COVID-19 pandemic. At twenty-eight participants, it was the largest field in G1 Climax history and the most competitors since 2014. The tournament also ran in a four-block round-robin format for the first time since 2000.

The event saw the G1 Climax debuts of Tom Lawlor, Jonah, El Phantasmo, Aaron Henare, and David Finlay.

== Production ==
=== Tournament rules ===
Other on-screen personnel
Role:	Name:
English Commentators	Kevin Kelly
English Commentators	Chris Charlton (nights 1–2, 4–7, 11–13, 16, 18–20)
English Commentators	El Phantasmo (nights 8 & 14)
English Commentators	Tom Lawlor (night 9)
English Commentators	Lance Archer (nights 10 & 15)
English Commentators	David Finlay (night 16)
English Commentators	Jonah (night 17)
English Commentators	Chase Owens (night 18)
Japanese Commentators	Milano Collection A.T. (nights 1–3, 8–13, 17–20)
Japanese Commentators	Shigeki Kiyono (nights 8–9, 11–13, 17)
Japanese Commentators	Kazuki Kusanagi (nights 4, 16, 20)
Japanese Commentators	Hiroki Mikami (nights 1 & 2)
Japanese Commentators	Miki Motoi (nights 4–7)
Japanese Commentators	Haruo Murata (nights 3 & 10)
Japanese Commentators	Shimpei Nogami (night 18)
Japanese Commentators	Yusuke Okamoto (nights 14–16)
Japanese Commentators	Yohei Ohnishi (night 18)
Japanese Commentators	Yuichi Tabata (nights 1–2, 6–7, 16, 19)
Japanese Commentators	Shunpei Terakawa (nights 5, 18, 20)
Japanese Commentators	Daisuke Takahashi (nights 4–7)
Japanese Commentators	Koki Yamazaki (nights 14–15, 19)
Japanese Commentators	Shinji Yoshino (nights 1–2, 14–15, 19–20)
Ring announcers	Kimihiko Ozaki
Ring announcers	Makoto Abe
Referees	Jeremy Marcus
Referees	Kenta Sato
Referees	Yuya Sakamoto
Referees	Marty Asami
Referees	Red Shoes Unno

The tournament features twenty-eight wrestlers, divided into four blocks of seven ("A", "B", "C", and "D"). Each participant faces all six other wrestlers within the same block in singles matches. The winner of each block is determined via a point system, with two points for a win, one point for a draw, and no points for a loss; each night of the event sees one match from each block between two members competing for the tournament. In case of several wrestlers sharing the top score, the results of the matches those wrestlers had when facing each other in the tournament act as tiebreaker, with the one having the most wins over the other top-scorers determining the winner of the block.

On the final two days of the event, the respective winners of each block enter a four-man single-elimination playoff to determine the winner of the G1 Climax, who would gain a future match for the IWGP World Heavyweight Championship, NJPW's top championship, at Wrestle Kingdom, NJPW's biggest yearly event; if the IWGP Heavyweight Champion himself wins, he selects his opponent at Wrestle Kingdom. The Young Lion matches have a fifteen-minutes time limit, while the matches of the tournament have a 30-minutes time limit (with the time limit being reached resulting in a tie); the semifinal (block winners) and final (semifinal winners) matches, where a winner must be determined, have no time limit.

=== History ===
On April 9, 2022, at Hyper Battle '22, NJPW announced that the 2022 edition of the G1 Climax would take place from July to August, returning to the summer for the first time since 2019. During Dominion 6.12 in Osaka-jo Hall on June 22, NJPW announced the participants for the G1 Climax.

=== Storylines ===
The event includes matches that result from scripted storylines, where wrestlers portray heroes, villains, or less distinguishable characters in scripted events that build tension and culminate in a wrestling match or series of matches.

=== Venues ===
Dates	Venue	Location
July 16	Hokkai Kitayell	Toyohira-ku, Sapporo
July 17	Hokkai Kitayell	Toyohira-ku, Sapporo
July 20	Xebio Arena Sendai	Sendai, Miyagi
July 23	Ota City General Gymnasium	Ōta, Tokyo
July 24	Ota City General Gymnasium	Ōta, Tokyo
July 26	Korakuen Hall	Bunkyo, Tokyo
July 27	Korakuen Hall	Bunkyo, Tokyo
July 30	Aichi Prefectural Gymnasium	Nagoya, Aichi
July 31	Aichi Prefectural Gymnasium	Nagoya, Aichi
August 2	Hamamatsu Arena	Hamamatsu, Shizuoka
August 5	Item Ehime	Matsuyama, Ehime
August 6	Osaka Prefectural Gymnasium	Namba, Osaka
August 7	Osaka Prefectural Gymnasium	Namba, Osaka
August 9	Hiroshima Sun Plaza	Nishi-ku, Hiroshima
August 10	Hiroshima Sun Plaza	Nishi-ku, Hiroshima
August 13	Machida Municipal Gymnasium	Machida, Tokyo
August 14	White Ring	Nagano, Nagano
August 16	Nippon Budokan	Chiyoda, Tokyo
August 17	Nippon Budokan	Chiyoda, Tokyo
August 18	Nippon Budokan	Chiyoda, Tokyo

== Results ==
=== Night 1 ===
The first night of the tournament took place on July 16, 2022, at Hokkai Kitayell in Toyohira-ku, Sapporo.

No.	Results	Stipulations	Times
1	Tom Lawlor defeated Kosei Fujita by pinfall	Singles match	3:48
2	TMDK (Jonah and Bad Dude Tito) defeated Toru Yano and Ryohei Oiwa by pinfall	Tag team match	6:16
3	House of Torture (Evil, Yujiro Takahashi and Sho) defeated Guerrillas of Destiny (Tama Tonga and Jado) and David Finlay by pinfall	Six-man tag team match	6:02
4	Bullet Club (Kenta, Juice Robinson, Bad Luck Fale and Chase Owens) defeated Suzuki-gun (Lance Archer, Taichi, Zack Sabre Jr. and Taka Michinoku) by pinfall	Eight-man tag team match	5:55
5	Chaos (Hirooki Goto, Tomohiro Ishii and Yoshi-Hashi) defeated Los Ingobernables de Japon (Tetsuya Naito, Shingo Takagi and Bushi) by pinfall	Six-man tag team match	9:53
6	Aaron Henare defeated Hiroshi Tanahashi by pinfall	C Block singles match in the G1 Climax tournament	11:11
7	Will Ospreay defeated El Phantasmo by pinfall	D Block singles match in the G1 Climax tournament	15:06
8	Jay White defeated Sanada by pinfall	B Block singles match in the G1 Climax tournament	18:07
9	Kazuchika Okada defeated Jeff Cobb by pinfall	A Block singles match in the G1 Climax tournament	21:30

==== Tournament scores ====
A Block					B Block					C Block					D Block				
Rank	Wrestler	Result	Points		Rank	Wrestler	Result	Points		Rank	Wrestler	Result	Points		Rank	Wrestler	Result	Points	
Rank	Wrestler	Result	Pre	Post	Rank	Wrestler	Result	Pre	Post	Rank	Wrestler	Result	Pre	Post	Rank	Wrestler	Result	Pre	Post
1	Okada	Win	0	2	1	White	Win	0	2	1	Henare	Win	0	2	1	Ospreay	Win	0	2
2	Cobb	Loss	0	0	2	Sanada	Loss	0	0	2	Tanahashi	Loss	0	0	2	Phantasmo	Loss	0	0
2	Yano	DNC	0	0	2	Tonga	DNC	0	0	2	Evil	DNC	0	0	2	Robinson	DNC	0	0
2	Archer	DNC	0	0	2	Ishii	DNC	0	0	2	Goto	DNC	0	0	2	Yoshi-Hashi	DNC	0	0
2	Fale	DNC	0	0	2	Taichi	DNC	0	0	2	Sabre	DNC	0	0	2	Takagi	DNC	0	0
2	Lawlor	DNC	0	0	2	O-Khan	DNC	0	0	2	Kenta	DNC	0	0	2	Takahashi	DNC	0	0
2	Jonah	DNC	0	0	2	Owens	DNC	0	0	2	Naito	DNC	0	0	2	Finlay	DNC	0	0

=== Night 2 ===
The second night of the tournament took place on July 17, 2022, at Hokkai Kitayell in Toyohira-ku, Sapporo.

No.	Results	Stipulations	Times
1	David Finlay and Yoshi-Hashi defeated Team Filthy (Tom Lawlor and Royce Isaacs) by pinfall	Tag team match	7:30
2	Bullet Club (Bad Luck Fale and El Phantasmo) defeated Suzuki-gun (Taka Michinoku and Lance Archer) by pinfall	Tag team match	8:21
3	United Empire (Will Ospreay, Great-O-Khan, Jeff Cobb and Aaron Henare) defeated House of Torture (Evil, Yujiro Takahashi, Sho and Dick Togo) by pinfall	Eight-man tag team match	10:22
4	Bullet Club (Jay White and Chase Owens) defeated Guerrillas of Destiny (Tama Tonga and Jado) by pinfall	Tag team match	7:15
5	Chaos (Kazuchika Okada and Hirooki Goto) and Hiroshi Tanahashi defeated Los Ingobernables de Japon (Tetsuya Naito, Sanada and Bushi) by pinfall	Six-man tag team match	5:50
6	Taichi defeated Tomohiro Ishii by pinfall	B Block singles match in the G1 Climax tournament	15:21
7	Toru Yano defeated Jonah by count out	A Block singles match in the G1 Climax tournament	9:01
8	Zack Sabre Jr. defeated Kenta by submission	C Block singles match in the G1 Climax tournament	21:33
9	Juice Robinson defeated Shingo Takagi by pinfall	D Block singles match in the G1 Climax tournament	21:33

==== Tournament scores ====
A Block					B Block					C Block					D Block				
Rank	Wrestler	Result	Points		Rank	Wrestler	Result	Points		Rank	Wrestler	Result	Points		Rank	Wrestler	Result	Points	
Rank	Wrestler	Result	Pre	Post	Rank	Wrestler	Result	Pre	Post	Rank	Wrestler	Result	Pre	Post	Rank	Wrestler	Result	Pre	Post
1	Okada	DNC	2	2	1	White	DNC	2	2	1	Henare	DNC	2	2	1	Ospreay	DNC	2	2
1	Yano	Win	0	2	1	Taichi	Win	0	2	1	Sabre	Win	0	2	1	Robinson	Win	0	2
2	Jonah	Loss	0	0	2	Ishii	Loss	0	0	2	Kenta	Loss	0	0	2	Takagi	Loss	0	0
2	Cobb	DNC	0	0	2	Sanada	DNC	0	0	2	Tanahashi	DNC	0	0	2	Phantasmo	DNC	0	0
2	Archer	DNC	0	0	2	Tonga	DNC	0	0	2	Goto	DNC	0	0	2	Yoshi-Hashi	DNC	0	0
2	Lawlor	DNC	0	0	2	O-Khan	DNC	0	0	2	Evil	DNC	0	0	2	Takahashi	DNC	0	0
2	Fale	DNC	0	0	2	Owens	DNC	0	0	2	Naito	DNC	0	0	2	Finlay	DNC	0	0

=== Night 3 ===
The third night of the tournament took place on July 20, 2022, at Xebio Arena Sendai in Sendai, Miyagi.

No.	Results	Stipulations	Times
1	TMDK (Jonah & Bad Dude Tito) defeated Team Filthy (Tom Lawlor & Royce Isaacs) by pinfall	Tag team match	8:38
2	United Empire (Will Ospreay, Great-O-Khan, Jeff Cobb and Aaron Henare) defeated Bullet Club (Evil, El Phantasmo, Sho and Dick Togo) by submission	Eight-man tag team match	7:25
3	Chaos (Kazuchika Okada and Yoshi-Hashi) defeated Toru Yano and Ryohei Oiwa by submission	Tag team match	7:26
4	Bullet Club (Jay White, Juice Robinson and Kenta) defeated Hiroshi Tanahashi, Tomohiro Ishii and Kosei Fujita by submission	Six-man tag team match	10:30
5	Los Ingobernables de Japon (Shingo Takagi, Sanada and Bushi) defeated Suzuki-gun (Taichi, Zack Sabre Jr. and Taka Michinoku) by submission	Six-man tag team match	8:17
6	Yujiro Takahashi defeated David Finlay by pinfall	D Block singles match in the G1 Climax tournament	12:59
7	Tama Tonga defeated Chase Owens by pinfall	B Block singles match in the G1 Climax tournament	13:18
8	Bad Luck Fale defeated Lance Archer by count out	A Block singles match in the G1 Climax tournament	10:46
9	Hirooki Goto defeated Tetsuya Naito by pinfall	C Block singles match in the G1 Climax tournament	22:41

==== Tournament scores ====
A Block					B Block					C Block					D Block				
Rank	Wrestler	Result	Points		Rank	Wrestler	Result	Points		Rank	Wrestler	Result	Points		Rank	Wrestler	Result	Points	
Rank	Wrestler	Result	Pre	Post	Rank	Wrestler	Result	Pre	Post	Rank	Wrestler	Result	Pre	Post	Rank	Wrestler	Result	Pre	Post
1	Okada	DNC	2	2	1	White	DNC	2	2	1	Henare	DNC	2	2	1	Ospreay	DNC	2	2
1	Yano	DNC	2	2	1	Taichi	DNC	2	2	1	Sabre	DNC	2	2	1	Robinson	DNC	2	2
1	Fale	Win	0	2	1	Tonga	Win	0	2	1	Goto	Win	0	2	1	Takahashi	Win	0	2
2	Archer	Loss	0	0	2	Owens	Loss	0	0	2	Naito	Loss	0	0	2	Finlay	Loss	0	0
2	Cobb	DNC	0	0	2	Ishii	DNC	0	0	2	Kenta	DNC	0	0	2	Yoshi-Hashi	DNC	0	0
2	Lawlor	DNC	0	0	2	O-Khan	DNC	0	0	2	Evil	DNC	0	0	2	Takagi	DNC	0	0
2	Jonah	DNC	0	0	2	Sanada	DNC	0	0	2	Tanahashi	DNC	0	0	2	Phantasmo	DNC	0	0

=== Night 4 ===
The fourth night of the tournament took place on July 23, 2022, at Ota City General Gymnasium in Ōta, Tokyo.

No.	Results	Stipulations	Times
1	Bullet Club (Juice Robinson, Kenta and El Phantasmo) defeated Hirooki Goto, David Finlay and Ryohei Oiwa by pinfall	Six-man tag team match	8:01
2	Team Filthy (Tom Lawlor and Royce Isaacs) defeated TMDK (Jonah and Bad Dude Tito) by submission	Tag team match	9:20
3	Bullet Club (Bad Luck Fale, Chase Owens and Yujiro Takahashi) defeated Suzuki-gun (Lance Archer, Taichi and Taka Michinoku) by submission	Six-man tag team match	6:10
4	United Empire (Will Ospreay, Great-O-Khan and Jeff Cobb) defeated House of Torture (Evil, Sho and Dick Togo) by submission	Six-man tag team match	7:47
5	Los Ingobernables de Japon (Tetsuya Naito, Sanada and Bushi) defeated Hiroshi Tanahashi and Guerrillas of Destiny (Tama Tonga and Jado) by submission	Six-man tag team match	9:29
6	Zack Sabre Jr. defeated Aaron Henare by submission	C Block singles match in the G1 Climax tournament	14:15
7	Shingo Takagi defeated Yoshi-Hashi by pinfall	D Block singles match in the G1 Climax tournament	17:28
8	Kazuchika Okada defeated Toru Yano by submission	A Block singles match in the G1 Climax tournament	10:10
9	Jay White defeated Tomohiro Ishii by pinfall	B Block singles match in the G1 Climax tournament	22:02

==== Tournament scores ====
A Block					B Block					C Block					D Block				
Rank	Wrestler	Result	Points		Rank	Wrestler	Result	Points		Rank	Wrestler	Result	Points		Rank	Wrestler	Result	Points	
Rank	Wrestler	Result	Pre	Post	Rank	Wrestler	Result	Pre	Post	Rank	Wrestler	Result	Pre	Post	Rank	Wrestler	Result	Pre	Post
1	Okada	Win	2	4	1	White	Win	2	4	1	Sabre	Win	2	4	1	Robinson	DNC	2	2
2	Yano	Loss	2	2	2	Taichi	DNC	2	2	2	Henare	Loss	2	2	1	Ospreay	DNC	2	2
2	Fale	DNC	2	2	2	Tonga	DNC	2	2	2	Goto	DNC	2	2	1	Takahashi	DNC	2	2
3	Archer	DNC	0	0	3	Owens	DNC	0	0	3	Naito	DNC	0	0	1	Takagi	Win	0	2
3	Cobb	DNC	0	0	3	Ishii	Loss	0	0	3	Kenta	DNC	0	0	2	Yoshi-Hashi	Loss	0	0
3	Lawlor	DNC	0	0	3	O-Khan	DNC	0	0	3	Evil	DNC	0	0	2	Finlay	DNC	0	0
3	Jonah	DNC	0	0	3	Sanada	DNC	0	0	3	Tanahashi	DNC	0	0	2	Phantasmo	DNC	0	0

=== Night 5 ===
The fifth night of the tournament took place on July 24, 2022, at Ota City General Gymnasium in Ōta, Tokyo.

No.	Results	Stipulations	Times
1	Chaos (Hirooki Goto, Yoshi-Hashi and Toru Yano) defeated House of Torture (Evil, Sho and Dick Togo) by pinfall	Six-man tag team match	7:14
2	Bullet Club (Kenta and Chase Owens) defeated Team Filthy (Tom Lawlor and Royce Isaacs) by pinfall	Tag team match	8:52
3	TMDK (Jonah and Bad Dude Tito) defeated Los Ingobernables de Japon (Shingo Takagi and Bushi) by pinfall	Tag team match	8:35
4	United Empire (Will Ospreay, Great-O-Khan and Aaron Henare) defeated Suzuki-gun (Lance Archer, Zack Sabre Jr. and Taka Michinoku) by submission	Six-man tag team match	6:22
5	Kazuchika Okada, Tama Tonga and David Finlay defeated Bullet Club (Jay White, Juice Robinson and Gedo) by pinfall	Six-man tag team match	9:42
6	El Phantasmo defeated Yujiro Takahashi by pinfall	D Block singles match in the G1 Climax tournament	15:39
7	Sanada defeated Taichi by pinfall	B Block singles match in the G1 Climax tournament	16:09
8	Jeff Cobb defeated Bad Luck Fale by pinfall	A Block singles match in the G1 Climax tournament	7:13
9	Hiroshi Tanahashi defeated Tetsuya Naito by pinfall	C Block singles match in the G1 Climax tournament	22:22

==== Tournament scores ====
A Block					B Block					C Block					D Block				
Rank	Wrestler	Result	Points		Rank	Wrestler	Result	Points		Rank	Wrestler	Result	Points		Rank	Wrestler	Result	Points	
Rank	Wrestler	Result	Pre	Post	Rank	Wrestler	Result	Pre	Post	Rank	Wrestler	Result	Pre	Post	Rank	Wrestler	Result	Pre	Post
1	Okada	DNC	4	4	1	White	DNC	4	4	1	Sabre	DNC	4	4	1	Ospreay	DNC	2	2
2	Yano	DNC	2	2	2	Sanada	Win	0	2	2	Henare	DNC	2	2	1	Robinson	DNC	2	2
2	Cobb	Win	0	2	2	Taichi	Loss	2	2	2	Goto	DNC	2	2	1	Phantasmo	Win	0	2
2	Fale	Loss	2	2	2	Tonga	DNC	2	2	2	Tanahashi	Win	0	2	1	Takagi	DNC	2	2
3	Jonah	DNC	0	0	3	Owens	DNC	0	0	3	Kenta	DNC	0	0	1	Takahashi	Loss	2	2
3	Lawlor	DNC	0	0	3	O-Khan	DNC	0	0	3	Naito	Loss	0	0	2	Finlay	DNC	0	0
3	Archer	DNC	0	0	3	Ishii	DNC	0	0	3	Evil	DNC	0	0	2	Yoshi-Hashi	DNC	0	0

=== Night 6 ===
The sixth night of the tournament took place on July 26, 2022, at Korakuen Hall in Bunkyo, Tokyo.

No.	Results	Stipulations	Times
1	House of Torture (Yujiro Takahashi and Sho) defeated Kosei Fujita and Yuto Nakashima by submission	Tag team match	6:27
2	Chaos (Tomohiro Ishii and Toru Yano) defeated TMDK (Jonah and Bad Dude Tito) by pinfall	Tag team match	8:16
3	United Empire (Will Ospreay, Jeff Cobb and Aaron Henare) defeated Hirooki Goto and Guerrillas of Destiny (Tama Tonga and Jado) by submission	Six-man tag team match	8:06
4	Hiroshi Tanahashi and Chaos (Kazuchika Okada and Yoshi-Hashi) defeated Suzuki-gun (Zack Sabre Jr., Taichi and Taka Michinoku) by pinfall	Six-man tag team match	9:02
5	Los Ingobernables de Japon (Tetsuya Naito, Shingo Takagi, Sanada and Bushi) defeated Bullet Club (Jay White, Bad Luck Fale, El Phantasmo and Gedo) by pinfall	Eight-man tag team match	10:05
6	Chase Owens defeated Great-O-Khan by pinfall	B Block singles match in the G1 Climax tournament	11:58
7	Evil defeated Kenta by count out	C Block singles match in the G1 Climax tournament	10:13
8	Lance Archer defeated Tom Lawlor by pinfall	A Block singles match in the G1 Climax tournament	11:50
9	David Finlay defeated Juice Robinson by pinfall	D Block singles match in the G1 Climax tournament	24:01

==== Tournament scores ====
A Block					B Block					C Block					D Block				
Rank	Wrestler	Result	Points		Rank	Wrestler	Result	Points		Rank	Wrestler	Result	Points		Rank	Wrestler	Result	Points	
Rank	Wrestler	Result	Pre	Post	Rank	Wrestler	Result	Pre	Post	Rank	Wrestler	Result	Pre	Post	Rank	Wrestler	Result	Pre	Post
1	Okada	DNC	4	4	1	White	DNC	4	4	1	Sabre	DNC	4	4	1	Ospreay	DNC	2	2
2	Yano	DNC	2	2	2	Sanada	DNC	2	2	2	Henare	DNC	2	2	1	Finlay	Win	0	2
2	Cobb	DNC	2	2	2	Taichi	DNC	2	2	2	Goto	DNC	2	2	1	Phantasmo	DNC	2	2
2	Fale	DNC	2	2	2	Tonga	DNC	2	2	2	Tanahashi	DNC	2	2	1	Takagi	DNC	2	2
2	Archer	Win	0	2	2	Owens	Win	0	2	2	Evil	Win	0	2	1	Takahashi	DNC	2	2
3	Lawlor	Loss	0	0	3	O-Khan	Loss	0	0	3	Kenta	Loss	0	0	1	Robinson	Loss	2	2
3	Jonah	DNC	0	0	3	Ishii	DNC	0	0	3	Naito	DNC	0	0	2	Yoshi-Hashi	DNC	0	0

=== Night 7 ===
The seventh night of the tournament took place on July 27, 2022, at Korakuen Hall in Bunkyo, Tokyo.

No.	Results	Stipulations	Times
1	House of Torture (Evil, Sho) (with Dick Togo) defeated Hiroshi Tanahashi and Yuto Nakashima by submission	Tag team match	7:01
2	Bullet Club (El Phantasmo and Kenta) defeated Team Filthy (Tom Lawlor and Royce Isaacs) by pinfall	Tag team match	7:35
3	United Empire (Great-O-Khan and Jeff Cobb) defeated TMDK (Jonah and Bad Dude Tito) by submission	Tag team match	5:22
4	Bullet Club (Jay White, Juice Robinson, Chase Owens and Gedo) defeated Chaos (Kazuchika Okada and Yoshi-Hashi), David Finlay and Kosei Fujita by pinfall	Eight-man tag team match	10:26
5	Los Ingobernables de Japon (Tetsuya Naito, Shingo Takagi, Sanada and Bushi) defeated Suzuki-gun (Lance Archer, Taichi, Zack Sabre Jr. and Taka Michinoku) by pinfall	Eight-man tag team match	7:27
6	Will Ospreay defeated Yujiro Takahashi by pinfall	D Block singles match in the G1 Climax tournament	11:17
7	Bad Luck Fale defeated Toru Yano by pinfall	A Block singles match in the G1 Climax tournament	5:36
8	Hirooki Goto defeated Aaron Henare by pinfall	C Block singles match in the G1 Climax tournament	17:12
9	Tomohiro Ishii defeated Tama Tonga by pinfall	B Block singles match in the G1 Climax tournament	20:07

==== Tournament scores ====
A Block					B Block					C Block					D Block				
Rank	Wrestler	Result	Points		Rank	Wrestler	Result	Points		Rank	Wrestler	Result	Points		Rank	Wrestler	Result	Points	
Rank	Wrestler	Result	Pre	Post	Rank	Wrestler	Result	Pre	Post	Rank	Wrestler	Result	Pre	Post	Rank	Wrestler	Result	Pre	Post
1	Okada	DNC	4	4	1	White	DNC	4	4	1	Sabre	DNC	4	4	1	Ospreay	Win	2	4
1	Fale	Win	2	4	2	Sanada	DNC	2	2	1	Goto	Win	2	4	2	Finlay	DNC	2	2
2	Cobb	DNC	2	2	2	Taichi	DNC	2	2	2	Henare	Loss	2	2	2	Phantasmo	DNC	2	2
2	Yano	Loss	2	2	2	Tonga	Loss	2	2	2	Tanahashi	DNC	2	2	2	Takagi	DNC	2	2
2	Archer	DNC	2	2	2	Owens	DNC	2	2	2	Evil	DNC	2	2	2	Takahashi	Loss	2	2
3	Lawlor	DNC	0	0	2	Ishii	Win	0	2	3	Kenta	DNC	0	0	2	Robinson	DNC	2	2
3	Jonah	DNC	0	0	3	O-Khan	DNC	0	0	3	Naito	DNC	0	0	3	Yoshi-Hashi	DNC	0	0

=== Night 8 ===
The eighth night of the tournament took place on July 30, 2022, at Aichi Prefectural Gymnasium in Nagoya, Aichi.

No.	Results	Stipulations	Times
1	House of Torture (Yujiro Takahashi and Sho) defeated Kosei Fujita and Ryohei Oiwa by submission	Tag team match	6:08
2	Bullet Club (El Phantasmo and Kenta) defeated Guerrillas of Destiny (Tama Tonga and Jado) by pinfall	Tag team match	6:33
3	United Empire (Will Ospreay, Jeff Cobb and Aaron Henare) defeated Suzuki-gun (Lance Archer, Taichi and Taka Michinoku) by submission	Six-man tag team match	6:28
4	Los Ingobernables de Japon (Tetsuya Naito and Bushi) defeated House of Torture (Evil and Dick Togo) by pinfall	Tag team match	8:05
5	Chaos (Kazuchika Okada, Hirooki Goto, Tomohiro Ishii, Yoshi-Hashi and Toru Yano) defeated Bullet Club (Jay White, Juice Robinson, Bad Luck Fale, Chase Owens and Gedo) by pinfall	Ten-man tag team match	8:36
6	David Finlay defeated Shingo Takagi by pinfall	D Block singles match in the G1 Climax tournament	14:50
7	Jonah defeated Tom Lawlor by pinfall	A Block singles match in the G1 Climax tournament	11:32
8	Sanada defeated Great-O-Khan by pinfall	B Block singles match in the G1 Climax tournament	16:35
9	Hiroshi Tanahashi defeated Zack Sabre Jr. by pinfall	C Block singles match in the G1 Climax tournament	17:32

==== Tournament scores ====
A Block					B Block					C Block					D Block				
Rank	Wrestler	Result	Points		Rank	Wrestler	Result	Points		Rank	Wrestler	Result	Points		Rank	Wrestler	Result	Points	
Rank	Wrestler	Result	Pre	Post	Rank	Wrestler	Result	Pre	Post	Rank	Wrestler	Result	Pre	Post	Rank	Wrestler	Result	Pre	Post
1	Okada	DNC	4	4	1	White	DNC	4	4	1	Tanahashi	Win	2	4	1	Ospreay	DNC	4	4
1	Fale	DNC	4	4	1	Sanada	Win	2	4	1	Sabre	Loss	4	4	1	Finlay	Win	2	4
2	Cobb	DNC	2	2	2	Taichi	DNC	2	2	1	Goto	DNC	4	4	2	Phantasmo	DNC	2	2
2	Yano	DNC	2	2	2	Tonga	DNC	2	2	2	Henare	DNC	2	2	2	Takagi	Loss	2	2
2	Archer	DNC	2	2	2	Owens	DNC	2	2	2	Evil	DNC	2	2	2	Takahashi	DNC	2	2
2	Jonah	Win	0	2	2	Ishii	DNC	0	2	3	Kenta	DNC	0	0	2	Robinson	DNC	2	2
3	Lawlor	Loss	0	0	3	O-Khan	Loss	0	0	3	Naito	DNC	0	0	3	Yoshi-Hashi	DNC	0	0

=== Night 9 ===
The ninth night of the tournament took place on July 31, 2022, at Aichi Prefectural Gymnasium in Nagoya, Aichi.

No.	Results	Stipulations	Times
1	Bullet Club (El Phantasmo, Kenta, Yujiro Takahashi and Sho) defeated Hiroshi Tanahashi, Hirooki Goto, Tomohiro Ishii and Ryohei Oiwa by submission	Eight-man tag team match	8:20
2	TMDK (Jonah and Bad Dude Tito) defeated Team Filthy (Tom Lawlor and Royce Isaacs) by pinfall	Tag team match	10:02
3	United Empire (Will Ospreay, Great-O-Khan and Aaron Henare) defeated David Finlay and Guerrillas of Destiny (Tama Tonga and Jado) by pinfall	Six-man tag team match	7:29
4	Los Ingobernables de Japon (Shingo Takagi, Sanada and Bushi) defeated Suzuki-gun (Taichi, Zack Sabre Jr. and Taka Michinoku) by pinfall	Six-man tag team match	8:15
5	Jeff Cobb defeated Lance Archer by pinfall	A Block singles match in the G1 Climax tournament	11:37
6	Yoshi-Hashi defeated Juice Robinson by pinfall	D Block singles match in the G1 Climax tournament	12:16
7	Jay White defeated Chase Owens by pinfall	B Block singles match in the G1 Climax tournament	13:12
8	Kazuchika Okada defeated Bad Luck Fale by submission	A Block singles match in the G1 Climax tournament	11:52
9	Tetsuya Naito defeated Evil by pinfall	C Block singles match in the G1 Climax tournament	24:54

==== Tournament scores ====
A Block					B Block					C Block					D Block				
Rank	Wrestler	Result	Points		Rank	Wrestler	Result	Points		Rank	Wrestler	Result	Points		Rank	Wrestler	Result	Points	
Rank	Wrestler	Result	Pre	Post	Rank	Wrestler	Result	Pre	Post	Rank	Wrestler	Result	Pre	Post	Rank	Wrestler	Result	Pre	Post
1	Okada	Win	4	6	1	White	Win	4	6	1	Tanahashi	DNC	4	4	1	Ospreay	DNC	4	4
2	Fale	Loss	4	4	2	Sanada	DNC	4	4	1	Sabre	DNC	4	4	1	Finlay	DNC	4	4
2	Cobb	Win	2	4	3	Taichi	DNC	2	2	1	Goto	DNC	4	4	2	Phantasmo	DNC	2	2
3	Yano	DNC	2	2	3	Tonga	DNC	2	2	2	Henare	DNC	2	2	2	Takagi	DNC	2	2
3	Archer	Loss	2	2	3	Owens	Loss	2	2	2	Naito	Win	0	2	2	Takahashi	DNC	2	2
3	Jonah	DNC	2	2	3	Ishii	DNC	2	2	2	Evil	Loss	2	2	2	Yoshi-Hashi	Win	0	2
4	Lawlor	DNC	0	0	4	O-Khan	DNC	0	0	3	Kenta	DNC	0	0	2	Robinson	Loss	2	2

=== Night 10 ===
The tenth night of the tournament took place on August 2, 2022, at Hamamatsu Arena in Hamamatsu, Shizuoka.

No.	Results	Stipulations	Times
1	United Empire (Jeff Cobb and Aaron Henare) defeated TMDK (Jonah and Bad Dude Tito) by pinfall	Tag team match	7:30
2	House of Torture (Evil, Yujiro Takahashi, Sho and Dick Togo) defeated Suzuki-gun (Lance Archer, Taichi, Zack Sabre Jr. and Taka Michinoku) by pinfall	Eight-man tag team match	9:06
3	Bullet Club (Bad Luck Fale, El Phantasmo and Chase Owens) defeated Los Ingobernables de Japon (Tetsuya Naito, Shingo Takagi and Bushi) by pinfall	Six-man tag team match	6:53
4	Hiroshi Tanahashi and Chaos (Kazuchika Okada and Yoshi-Hashi) defeated Bullet Club (Jay White, Juice Robinson and Gedo) by submission	Six-man tag team match	7:53
5	Great-O-Khan defeated Tomohiro Ishii by pinfall	B Block singles match in the G1 Climax tournament	12:59
6	Tom Lawlor defeated Toru Yano by pinfall	A Block singles match in the G1 Climax tournament	10:13
7	Tama Tonga defeated Sanada by pinfall	B Block singles match in the G1 Climax tournament	16:28
8	Kenta defeated Hirooki Goto by pinfall	C Block singles match in the G1 Climax tournament	18:08
9	David Finlay defeated Will Ospreay by pinfall	D Block singles match in the G1 Climax tournament	15:28

==== Tournament scores ====
A Block					B Block					C Block					D Block				
Rank	Wrestler	Result	Points		Rank	Wrestler	Result	Points		Rank	Wrestler	Result	Points		Rank	Wrestler	Result	Points	
Rank	Wrestler	Result	Pre	Post	Rank	Wrestler	Result	Pre	Post	Rank	Wrestler	Result	Pre	Post	Rank	Wrestler	Result	Pre	Post
1	Okada	DNC	6	6	1	White	DNC	6	6	1	Tanahashi	DNC	4	4	1	Finlay	Win	4	6
2	Fale	DNC	4	4	2	Tonga	Win	2	4	1	Sabre	DNC	4	4	2	Ospreay	Loss	4	4
2	Cobb	DNC	4	4	2	Sanada	Loss	4	4	1	Goto	Loss	4	4	3	Phantasmo	DNC	2	2
3	Lawlor	Win	0	2	3	Taichi	DNC	2	2	2	Kenta	Win	0	2	3	Takagi	DNC	2	2
3	Yano	Loss	2	2	3	Owens	DNC	2	2	2	Naito	DNC	2	2	3	Takahashi	DNC	2	2
3	Jonah	DNC	2	2	3	O-Khan	Win	0	2	2	Evil	DNC	2	2	3	Yoshi-Hashi	DNC	2	2
3	Archer	DNC	2	2	3	Ishii	Loss	2	2	2	Henare	DNC	2	2	3	Robinson	DNC	2	2

=== Night 11 ===
The eleventh night of the tournament took place on August 5, 2022, at Item Ehime in Matsuyama, Ehime.

No.	Results	Stipulations	Times
1	Guerrillas of Destiny (Tama Tonga and Jado) defeated David Finlay and Kosei Fujita by submission	Tag team match	6:42
2	United Empire (Will Ospreay and Great-O-Khan) defeated Team Filthy (Tom Lawlor and Royce Isaacs) by pinfall	Tag team match	7:26
3	Los Ingobernables de Japon (Sanada, Shingo Takagi and Bushi) defeated Suzuki-gun (Lance Archer, Zack Sabre Jr. and Taka Michinoku) by submission	Six-man tag team match	7:46
4	Chaos (Kazuchika Okada, Yoshi-Hashi, Hirooki Goto and Toru Yano) defeated Bullet Club (Jay White, El Phantasmo, Kenta and Gedo) by pinfall	Eight-man tag team match	9:06
5	Yujiro Takahashi defeated Juice Robinson by pinfall	D Block singles match in the G1 Climax tournament	11:36
6	Taichi defeated Chase Owens by pinfall	B Block singles match in the G1 Climax tournament	13:25
7	Tetsuya Naito defeated Aaron Henare by pinfall	C Block singles match in the G1 Climax tournament	17:31
8	Jonah defeated Jeff Cobb by pinfall	A Block singles match in the G1 Climax tournament	14:50
9	Hiroshi Tanahashi defeated Evil by pinfall	C Block singles match in the G1 Climax tournament	19:01

==== Tournament scores ====
A Block					B Block					C Block					D Block				
Rank	Wrestler	Result	Points		Rank	Wrestler	Result	Points		Rank	Wrestler	Result	Points		Rank	Wrestler	Result	Points	
Rank	Wrestler	Result	Pre	Post	Rank	Wrestler	Result	Pre	Post	Rank	Wrestler	Result	Pre	Post	Rank	Wrestler	Result	Pre	Post
1	Okada	DNC	6	6	1	White	DNC	6	6	1	Tanahashi	Win	4	6	1	Finlay	DNC	6	6
2	Fale	DNC	4	4	2	Tonga	DNC	4	4	2	Sabre	DNC	4	4	2	Ospreay	DNC	4	4
2	Jonah	Win	2	4	2	Sanada	DNC	4	4	2	Goto	DNC	4	4	2	Takahashi	Win	2	4
2	Cobb	Loss	4	4	2	Taichi	Win	2	4	2	Naito	Win	2	4	3	Takagi	DNC	2	2
3	Yano	DNC	2	2	3	Owens	Loss	2	2	3	Kenta	DNC	2	2	3	Phantasmo	DNC	2	2
3	Archer	DNC	2	2	3	O-Khan	DNC	2	2	3	Evil	Loss	2	2	3	Yoshi-Hashi	DNC	2	2
3	Lawlor	DNC	2	2	3	Ishii	DNC	2	2	3	Henare	Loss	2	2	3	Robinson	Loss	2	2

=== Night 12 ===
The twelfth night of the tournament took place on August 6, 2022, at Osaka Prefectural Gymnasium in Namba, Osaka.

No.	Results	Stipulations	Times
1	Bullet Club (Evil, Chase Owens, Yujiro Takahashi and Sho) defeated Tomohiro Ishii, Tama Tonga, David Finlay and Ryohei Oiwa by submission	Eight-man tag team match	8:47
2	United Empire (Jeff Cobb and Aaron Henare) defeated Team Filthy (Tom Lawlor and Royce Isaacs) by pinfall	Tag team match	9:33
3	Bullet Club (Kenta, Juice Robinson and Bad Luck Fale) defeated Los Ingobernables de Japon (Tetsuya Naito, Sanada and Bushi) by pinfall	Six-man tag team match	7:16
4	Kazuchika Okada and Hiroshi Tanahashi defeated TMDK (Jonah and Bad Dude Tito) by pinfall	Tag team match	8:40
5	Yoshi-Hashi defeated El Phantasmo by pinfall	D Block singles match in the G1 Climax tournament	15:47
6	Lance Archer defeated Toru Yano by pinfall	A Block singles match in the G1 Climax tournament	9:16
7	Zack Sabre Jr. defeated Hirooki Goto by submission	C Block singles match in the G1 Climax tournament	18:44
8	Jay White defeated Great-O-Khan by pinfall	B Block singles match in the G1 Climax tournament	18:14
9	Shingo Takagi defeated Will Ospreay by pinfall	D Block singles match in the G1 Climax tournament	21:55

==== Tournament scores ====
A Block					B Block					C Block					D Block				
Rank	Wrestler	Result	Points		Rank	Wrestler	Result	Points		Rank	Wrestler	Result	Points		Rank	Wrestler	Result	Points	
Rank	Wrestler	Result	Pre	Post	Rank	Wrestler	Result	Pre	Post	Rank	Wrestler	Result	Pre	Post	Rank	Wrestler	Result	Pre	Post
1	Okada	DNC	6	6	1	White	Win	6	8	1	Tanahashi	DNC	6	6	1	Finlay	DNC	6	6
2	Fale	DNC	4	4	2	Tonga	DNC	4	4	1	Sabre	Win	4	6	2	Takagi	Win	2	4
2	Jonah	DNC	4	4	2	Sanada	DNC	4	4	2	Goto	Loss	4	4	2	Ospreay	Loss	4	4
2	Cobb	DNC	4	4	2	Taichi	DNC	4	4	2	Naito	DNC	4	4	2	Takahashi	DNC	4	4
2	Archer	Win	2	4	3	Owens	DNC	2	2	3	Kenta	DNC	2	2	2	Yoshi-Hashi	Win	2	4
3	Lawlor	DNC	2	2	3	O-Khan	Loss	2	2	3	Evil	DNC	2	2	3	Phantasmo	Loss	2	2
3	Yano	Loss	2	2	3	Ishii	DNC	2	2	3	Henare	DNC	2	2	3	Robinson	DNC	2	2

=== Night 13 ===
The thirteenth night of the tournament took place on August 7, 2022, at Osaka Prefectural Gymnasium in Namba, Osaka.

No.	Results	Stipulations	Times
1	Chaos (Hirooki Goto, Toru Yano and Yoshi-Hashi) defeated Hiroshi Tanahashi, David Finlay and Yuto Nakashima by submission	Six-man tag team match	8:28
2	House of Torture (Yujiro Takahashi and Sho) defeated Guerrillas of Destiny (Tama Tonga and Jado) by pinfall	Tag team match	7:04
3	Los Ingobernables de Japon (Tetsuya Naito, Shingo Takagi, Sanada and Bushi) defeated Suzuki-gun (Lance Archer, Zack Sabre Jr., Taichi and Taka Michinoku) by pinfall	Eight-man tag team match	8:03
4	United Empire (Will Ospreay, Jeff Cobb and Great-O-Khan) defeated Bullet Club (Jay White, Kenta and Gedo) by submission	Tag team match	7:02
5	Evil defeated Aaron Henare by pinfall	C Block singles match in the G1 Climax tournament	10:28
6	Tom Lawlor defeated Bad Luck Fale by pinfall	A Block singles match in the G1 Climax tournament	11:05
7	Juice Robinson defeated El Phantasmo by disqualification	D Block singles match in the G1 Climax tournament	16:09
8	Chase Owens defeated Tomohiro Ishii by pinfall	B Block singles match in the G1 Climax tournament	16:50
9	Jonah defeated Kazuchika Okada by pinfall	A Block singles match in the G1 Climax tournament	21:53

==== Tournament scores ====
A Block					B Block					C Block					D Block				
Rank	Wrestler	Result	Points		Rank	Wrestler	Result	Points		Rank	Wrestler	Result	Points		Rank	Wrestler	Result	Points	
Rank	Wrestler	Result	Pre	Post	Rank	Wrestler	Result	Pre	Post	Rank	Wrestler	Result	Pre	Post	Rank	Wrestler	Result	Pre	Post
1	Jonah	Win	4	6	1	White	DNC	8	8	1	Tanahashi	DNC	6	6	1	Finlay	DNC	6	6
1	Okada	Loss	6	6	2	Tonga	DNC	4	4	1	Sabre	DNC	6	6	2	Takagi	DNC	4	4
2	Fale	Loss	4	4	2	Sanada	DNC	4	4	2	Goto	DNC	4	4	2	Ospreay	DNC	4	4
2	Cobb	DNC	4	4	2	Taichi	DNC	4	4	2	Naito	DNC	4	4	2	Takahashi	DNC	4	4
2	Archer	DNC	4	4	2	Owens	Win	2	4	2	Evil	Win	2	4	2	Yoshi-Hashi	DNC	4	4
2	Lawlor	Win	2	4	3	O-Khan	DNC	2	2	3	Kenta	DNC	2	2	2	Robinson	Win	2	4
3	Yano	DNC	2	2	3	Ishii	Loss	2	2	3	Henare	Loss	2	2	3	Phantasmo	Loss	2	2

=== Night 14 ===
The fourteenth night of the tournament took place on August 9, 2022, at Hiroshima Sun Plaza in Nishi-ku, Hiroshima.

No.	Results	Stipulations	Times
1	Los Ingobernables de Japon (Shingo Takagi and Bushi) defeated Tomohiro Ishii and Kosei Fujita by submission	Tag team match	6:40
2	Team Filthy (Tom Lawlor and Royce Isaacs) defeated Suzuki-gun (Zack Sabre Jr. and Taka Michinoku) by pinfall	Tag team match	6:53
3	United Empire (Will Ospreay, Jeff Cobb, Great-O-Khan and Aaron Henare) defeated House of Torture (Evil, Yujiro Takahashi, Sho and Dick Togo) by referee stoppage	Eight-man tag team match	6:45
4	Chaos (Kazuchika Okada and Hirooki Goto) and Hiroshi Tanahashi defeated Bullet Club (Juice Robinson, Bad Luck Fale and Gedo) by pinfall	Six-man tag team match (Note: Toru Yano was removed from the match after Jay White was scratched because of heat stroke-like symptoms, making the match a six-man tag instead of an eight-man.)	8:42
5	Yujiro Takahashi defeated Yoshi-Hashi by pinfall	D Block singles match in the G1 Climax tournament	13:12
6	Sanada defeated Chase Owens by referee stoppage	B Block singles match in the G1 Climax tournament	12:45
7	Tama Tonga defeated Taichi by pinfall	B Block singles match in the G1 Climax tournament	16:53
8	Lance Archer defeated Jonah by count out	A Block singles match in the G1 Climax tournament	12:43
9	Tetsuya Naito defeated Kenta by pinfall	C Block singles match in the G1 Climax tournament	23:30

==== Tournament scores ====
A Block					B Block					C Block					D Block				
Rank	Wrestler	Result	Points		Rank	Wrestler	Result	Points		Rank	Wrestler	Result	Points		Rank	Wrestler	Result	Points	
Rank	Wrestler	Result	Pre	Post	Rank	Wrestler	Result	Pre	Post	Rank	Wrestler	Result	Pre	Post	Rank	Wrestler	Result	Pre	Post
1	Jonah	Loss	6	6	1	White	DNC	8	8	1	Tanahashi	DNC	6	6	1	Takahashi	Win	4	6
1	Okada	DNC	6	6	2	Sanada	Win	4	6	1	Sabre	DNC	6	6	1	Finlay	DNC	6	6
1	Archer	Win	4	6	2	Tonga	Win	4	6	1	Naito	Win	4	6	2	Takagi	DNC	4	4
2	Cobb	DNC	4	4	3	Taichi	Loss	4	4	2	Goto	DNC	4	4	2	Ospreay	DNC	4	4
2	Fale	DNC	4	4	3	Owens	Loss	4	4	2	Evil	DNC	4	4	2	Yoshi-Hashi	Loss	4	4
2	Lawlor	DNC	4	4	4	O-Khan	DNC	2	2	3	Kenta	Loss	2	2	2	Robinson	DNC	4	4
3	Yano	DNC	2	2	4	Ishii	DNC	2	2	3	Henare	DNC	2	2	3	Phantasmo	DNC	2	2

=== Night 15 ===
The fifteenth night of the tournament took place on August 10, 2022, at Hiroshima Sun Plaza in Nishi-ku, Hiroshima.

No.	Results	Stipulations	Times
1	United Empire (Will Ospreay, Jeff Cobb and Aaron Henare) defeated Yoshi-Hashi, Yuto Nakashima and Ryohei Oiwa by submission	Six-man tag team match	8:34
2	Chaos (Tomohiro Ishii and Toru Yano) defeated TMDK (Jonah and Bad Dude Tito) by pinfall	Tag team match	7:06
3	Suzuki-gun (Lance Archer, Taichi, Taka Michinoku) defeated Bullet Club (Gedo (Note: Gedo replaced Jay White, who was scratched on August 9 because of illness.), Kenta and Juice Robinson) by pinfall	Six-man tag team match	5:53
4	Bullet Club (Bad Luck Fale, Chase Owens, Yujiro Takahashi and Sho) defeated Los Ingobernables de Japon (Tetsuya Naito, Shingo Takagi, Sanada and Bushi) by pinfall	Eight-man tag team match	8:53
5	El Phantasmo defeated David Finlay by pinfall	D Block singles match in the G1 Climax tournament	14:23
6	Tama Tonga defeated Great-O-Khan by pinfall	B Block singles match in the G1 Climax tournament	14:32
7	Zack Sabre Jr. defeated Evil by pinfall	C Block singles match in the G1 Climax tournament	0:44
8	Kazuchika Okada defeated Tom Lawlor by pinfall	A Block singles match in the G1 Climax tournament	16:16
9	Hirooki Goto defeated Hiroshi Tanahashi by pinfall	C Block singles match in the G1 Climax tournament	19:01

==== Tournament scores ====
A Block					B Block					C Block					D Block				
Rank	Wrestler	Result	Points		Rank	Wrestler	Result	Points		Rank	Wrestler	Result	Points		Rank	Wrestler	Result	Points	
Rank	Wrestler	Result	Pre	Post	Rank	Wrestler	Result	Pre	Post	Rank	Wrestler	Result	Pre	Post	Rank	Wrestler	Result	Pre	Post
1	Okada	Win	6	8	1	White	DNC	8	8	1	Sabre	Win	6	8	1	Takahashi	DNC	6	6
2	Archer	DNC	6	6	1	Tonga	Win	6	8	2	Tanahashi	Loss	6	6	1	Finlay	Loss	6	6
2	Jonah	DNC	6	6	2	Sanada	DNC	6	6	2	Goto	Win	4	6	2	Takagi	DNC	4	4
3	Cobb	DNC	4	4	3	Taichi	DNC	4	4	2	Naito	DNC	6	6	2	Ospreay	DNC	4	4
3	Lawlor	Loss	4	4	3	Owens	DNC	4	4	3	Evil	Loss	4	4	2	Yoshi-Hashi	DNC	4	4
3	Fale	DNC	4	4	4	O-Khan	Loss	2	2	4	Kenta	DNC	2	2	2	Robinson	DNC	4	4
4	Yano	DNC	2	2	4	Ishii	DNC	2	2	4	Henare	DNC	2	2	2	Phantasmo	Win	2	4

=== Night 16 ===
The sixteenth night of the tournament took place on August 13, 2022, at Machida Municipal Gymnasium in Machida, Tokyo.

No.	Results	Stipulations	Times
1	Bullet Club (Juice Robinson, Bad Luck Fale, Chase Owens and El Phantasmo) defeated Hiroshi Tanahashi, David Finlay and Guerrillas of Destiny (Tama Tonga and Jado) by pinfall	Eight-man tag team match	7:26
2	TMDK (Jonah and Bad Dude Tito) defeated Team Filthy (Tom Lawlor and Royce Isaacs) by pinfall	Tag team match	10:12
3	Los Ingobernables de Japon (Tetsuya Naito, Sanada and Bushi) defeated Suzuki-gun (Lance Archer, Zack Sabre Jr., Taka Michinoku) by submission	Six-man tag team match	8:44
4	Chaos (Kazuchika Okada, Hirooki Goto and Tomohiro Ishii) defeated House of Torture (Evil, Sho and Dick Togo) by pinfall	Six-man tag team match	7:05
5	Kenta defeated Aaron Henare by submission	C Block singles match in the G1 Climax tournament	12:35
6	Jeff Cobb defeated Toru Yano by pinfall	A Block singles match in the G1 Climax tournament	4:28
7	Shingo Takagi defeated Yujiro Takahashi by pinfall	D Block singles match in the G1 Climax tournament	15:24
8	Will Ospreay defeated Yoshi-Hashi by pinfall	D Block singles match in the G1 Climax tournament	18:48
9	Jay White defeated Taichi by pinfall	B Block singles match in the G1 Climax tournament	23:30

==== Tournament scores ====
A Block					B Block					C Block					D Block				
Rank	Wrestler	Result	Points		Rank	Wrestler	Result	Points		Rank	Wrestler	Result	Points		Rank	Wrestler	Result	Points	
Rank	Wrestler	Result	Pre	Post	Rank	Wrestler	Result	Pre	Post	Rank	Wrestler	Result	Pre	Post	Rank	Wrestler	Result	Pre	Post
1	Okada	DNC	8	8	1	White	Win	8	10	1	Sabre	DNC	8	8	1	Takahashi	Loss	6	6
2	Jonah	DNC	6	6	1	Tonga	DNC	8	8	2	Tanahashi	DNC	6	6	1	Finlay	DNC	6	6
2	Cobb	Win	4	6	2	Sanada	DNC	6	6	2	Goto	DNC	4	6	1	Takagi	Win	4	6
2	Archer	DNC	6	6	3	Taichi	Loss	4	4	2	Naito	DNC	6	6	1	Ospreay	Win	4	6
3	Lawlor	DNC	4	4	3	Owens	DNC	4	4	3	Evil	DNC	4	4	2	Yoshi-Hashi	Loss	4	4
3	Fale	DNC	4	4	4	O-Khan	DNC	2	2	4	Kenta	Win	2	4	2	Robinson	DNC	4	4
4	Yano	Loss	2	2	4	Ishii	DNC	2	2	4	Henare	Loss	2	2	2	Phantasmo	DNC	4	4

=== Night 17 ===
The seventeenth night of the tournament took place on August 14, 2022, at White Ring in Nagano, Nagano.

No.	Results	Stipulations	Times
1	House of Torture (Evil, Yujiro Takahashi, Sho and Dick Togo) defeated Hirooki Goto, Yuto Nakashima, Ryohei Oiwa and Kosei Fujita by submission	Eight-man tag team match	8:05
2	United Empire (Will Ospreay and Aaron Henare) defeated TMDK (Jonah and Bad Dude Tito) by pinfall	Tag team match	4:52
3	Bullet Club (Juice Robinson, Bad Luck Fale, Chase Owens and El Phantasmo) defeated Los Ingobernables de Japon (Tetsuya Naito, Shingo Takagi, Sanada and Bushi) by pinfall	Eight-man tag team match	7:31
4	Chaos (Kazuchika Okada, Yoshi-Hashi and Tomohiro Ishii) defeated Suzuki-gun (Lance Archer, Zack Sabre Jr. and Taka Michinoku) by pinfall	Six-man tag team match	6:35
5	Guerrillas of Destiny (Tama Tonga and Jado) defeated Bullet Club (Jay White and Gedo) by pinfall	Tag team match	7:07
6	Yoshi-Hashi defeated David Finlay by pinfall	D Block singles match in the G1 Climax tournament	11:14
7	Great-O-Khan defeated Taichi by pinfall	B Block singles match in the G1 Climax tournament	7:06
8	Tom Lawlor defeated Jeff Cobb by pinfall	A Block singles match in the G1 Climax tournament	14:03
9	Kenta defeated Hiroshi Tanahashi by pinfall	C Block singles match in the G1 Climax tournament	23:46

==== Tournament scores ====
A Block					B Block					C Block					D Block				
Rank	Wrestler	Result	Points		Rank	Wrestler	Result	Points		Rank	Wrestler	Result	Points		Rank	Wrestler	Result	Points	
Rank	Wrestler	Result	Pre	Post	Rank	Wrestler	Result	Pre	Post	Rank	Wrestler	Result	Pre	Post	Rank	Wrestler	Result	Pre	Post
1	Okada	DNC	8	8	1	White	DNC	10	10	1	Sabre	DNC	8	8	1	Takahashi	DNC	6	6
2	Archer	DNC	6	6	1	Tonga	DNC	8	8	2	Goto	DNC	6	6	1	Finlay	Loss	6	6
2	Jonah	DNC	6	6	2	Sanada	DNC	6	6	2	Naito	DNC	6	6	1	Takagi	DNC	6	6
2	Lawlor	Win	4	6	3	Taichi	Loss	4	4	2	Kenta	Win	4	6	1	Ospreay	DNC	6	6
2	Cobb	Loss	6	6	3	Owens	DNC	4	4	2	Tanahashi	Loss	6	6	1	Yoshi-Hashi	Win	4	6
3	Fale	DNC	4	4	3	O-Khan	Win	2	4	3	Evil	DNC	4	4	2	Robinson	DNC	4	4
4	Yano	DNC	2	2	4	Ishii	DNC	2	2	4	Henare	DNC	2	2	2	Phantasmo	DNC	4	4

=== Night 18 ===
The eighteenth night of the tournament took place on August 16, 2022, at Nippon Budokan in Chiyoda, Tokyo.

No.	Results	Stipulations	Times
1	Will Ospreay defeated Juice Robinson by pinfall	D Block singles match in the G1 Climax tournament	11:07
2	El Phantasmo defeated Shingo Takagi by pinfall	D Block singles match in the G1 Climax tournament	12:12
3	Evil defeated Hirooki Goto by pinfall	C Block singles match in the G1 Climax tournament	8:40
4	Tetsuya Naito defeated Zack Sabre Jr. by pinfall	C Block singles match in the G1 Climax tournament	1:58
5	Tomohiro Ishii defeated Sanada by pinfall	B Block singles match in the G1 Climax tournament	12:35
6	Tama Tonga defeated Jay White by pinfall	B Block singles match in the G1 Climax tournament	13:56
7	Jonah defeated Bad Luck Fale by pinfall	A Block singles match in the G1 Climax tournament	9:13
8	Kazuchika Okada defeated Lance Archer by pinfall	A Block singles match in the G1 Climax tournament	12:43

==== Tournament scores ====
Colors
	Won the block																		
	Did not win the block																		
A Block					B Block					C Block					D Block				
Rank	Wrestler	Result	Points		Rank	Wrestler	Result	Points		Rank	Wrestler	Result	Points		Rank	Wrestler	Result	Points	
Rank	Wrestler	Result	Pre	Post	Rank	Wrestler	Result	Pre	Post	Rank	Wrestler	Result	Pre	Post	Rank	Wrestler	Result	Pre	Post
1	Okada	Win	8	10	1	Tonga	Win	8	10	1	Naito	Win	6	8	1	Ospreay	Win	6	8
2	Jonah	Win	6	8	1	White	Loss	10	10	1	Sabre	Loss	8	8	2	Takagi	Loss	6	6
3	Archer	Loss	6	6	2	Sanada	Loss	6	6	2	Kenta	DNC	6	6	2	Takahashi	DNC	6	6
3	Lawlor	DNC	6	6	3	Taichi	DNC	4	4	2	Goto	Loss	6	6	2	Finlay	DNC	6	6
3	Cobb	DNC	6	6	3	Owens	DNC	4	4	2	Tanahashi	DNC	6	6	2	Yoshi-Hashi	DNC	6	6
4	Fale	Loss	4	4	3	O-Khan	DNC	4	4	2	Evil	Win	4	6	2	Phantasmo	Win	4	6
5	Yano	DNC	2	2	3	Ishii	Win	2	4	3	Henare	DNC	2	2	3	Robinson	Loss	4	4

=== Night 19 ===
The nineteenth night of the tournament took place on August 17, 2022, at Nippon Budokan in Chiyoda, Tokyo.

No.	Results	Stipulations	Times
1	Chaos (Hirooki Goto, Tomohiro Ishii, Yoshi-Hashi and Yoh) defeated Suzuki-gun (Lance Archer, Yoshinobu Kanemaru, Taka Michinoku and Douki) by pinfall	Eight-man tag team match	6:24
2	Dangerous Tekkers (Taichi and Zack Sabre Jr.) defeated Team Filthy (Tom Lawlor and Royce Isaacs) by submission	Tag team match	8:54
3	TMDK (Bad Dude Tito and Jonah) defeated Great Bash Heel (Togi Makabe and Tomoaki Honma) by pinfall	Tag team match	8:31
4	Bullet Club (Chase Owens, Bad Luck Fale and Juice Robinson) defeated United Empire (Great-O-Khan, Aaron Henare and Jeff Cobb) by pinfall	Six-man tag team match	6:47
5	Bullet Club (Kenta, Evil, Yujiro Takahashi and El Phantasmo) defeated Los Ingobernables de Japon (Shingo Takagi, Sanada, Hiromu Takahashi and Bushi) by submission	Eight-man tag team match	9:50
6	Hiroshi Tanahashi, Toru Yano, David Finlay and Kushida defeated Bullet Club (Jay White, Karl Anderson, Doc Gallows and Taiji Ishimori) by pinfall	Eight-man tag team match	9:08
7	Kazuchika Okada defeated Tama Tonga by pinfall	Semi-final singles match in the G1 Climax tournament	19:08
8	Will Ospreay defeated Tetsuya Naito by pinfall	Semi-final singles match in the G1 Climax tournament	20:23

=== Night 20 ===
The final night of the tournament took place on August 18, 2022, at Nippon Budokan in Chiyoda, Tokyo.

No.	Results	Stipulations	Times
1	Chaos (Hirooki Goto, Tomohiro Ishii, Yoh and Yoshi-Hashi) defeated House of Torture (Dick Togo, Evil, Sho and Yujiro Takahashi) by pinfall	Eight-man tag team match	7:22
2	TMDK (Jonah and Bad Dude Tito) defeated Team Filthy (Tom Lawlor and Royce Isaacs) by pinfall	Tag team match	10:31
3	United Empire (Aaron Henare, Great-O-Khan and Jeff Cobb) defeated Bullet Club (Bad Luck Fale, Chase Owens and Juice Robinson) by pinfall	Six-man tag team match	6:01
4	Suzuki-gun (Lance Archer, Taichi and Zack Sabre Jr.) defeated Los Ingobernables de Japon (Bushi, Sanada and Tetsuya Naito) by pinfall	Six-man tag team match	8:01
5	Bullet Club (Kenta and El Phantasmo) defeated Los Ingobernables de Japon (Shingo Takagi and Hiromu Takahashi) by pinfall	Tag team match	8:39
6	David Finlay and Hiroshi Tanahashi defeated The Good Brothers (Karl Anderson and Doc Gallows) by pinfall	Tag team match	10:03
7	Tama Tonga and Kushida defeated Bullet Club (Jay White and Taiji Ishimori) by pinfall	Tag team match	9:30
8	Kazuchika Okada defeated Will Ospreay by pinfall	Final singles match in the G1 Climax tournament	33:53

== Participants ==
Final standings
Block A		Block B		Block C		Block D	
Kazuchika Okada	10	Tama Tonga	10	Tetsuya Naito	8	Will Ospreay	8
Jonah	8	Jay White	10	Zack Sabre Jr.	8	El Phantasmo	6
Lance Archer	6	Sanada	6	Evil	6	Shingo Takagi	6
Tom Lawlor	6	Taichi	4	Kenta	6	Yujiro Takahashi	6
Jeff Cobb	6	Great-O-Khan	4	Hirooki Goto	6	Yoshi-Hashi	6
Bad Luck Fale	4	Chase Owens	4	Hiroshi Tanahashi	6	David Finlay	6
Toru Yano	2	Tomohiro Ishii	4	Aaron Henare	2	Juice Robinson	4

Tournament overview
Block A	Okada	Yano	Cobb	Archer	Fale	Lawlor	Jonah
Okada	—N/a	Okada (10:10)	Okada (21:30)	Okada (12:43)	Okada (11:52)	Okada (16:16)	Jonah (21:53)
Yano	Okada (10:10)	—N/a	Cobb (4:28)	Archer (9:14)	Fale (5:36)	Lawlor (10:13)	Yano (9:01)
Cobb	Okada (21:30)	Cobb (4:28)	—N/a	Cobb (11:37)	Cobb (7:13)	Lawlor (14:03)	Jonah (14:50)
Archer	Okada (12:43)	Archer (9:14)	Cobb (11:37)	—N/a	Fale (10:46)	Archer (11:50)	Archer (12:43)
Fale	Okada (11:52)	Fale (5:36)	Cobb (7:13)	Fale (10:46)	—N/a	Lawlor (11:05)	Jonah (9:13)
Lawlor	Okada (16:16)	Lawlor (10:13)	Lawlor (14:03)	Archer (11:50)	Lawlor (11:05)	—N/a	Jonah (11:32)
Jonah	Jonah (21:53)	Yano (9:01)	Jonah (14:50)	Archer (12:43)	Jonah (9:13)	Jonah (11:32)	—N/a
Block B	White	Taichi	Tonga	Ishii	Sanada	O-Khan	Owens
White	—N/a	White (23:30)	Tonga (13:56)	White (22:02)	White (18:07)	White (18:14)	White (13:12)
Taichi	White (23:30)	—N/a	Tonga (16:53)	Taichi (15:21)	Sanada (16:09)	O-Khan (7:06)	Taichi (13:25)
Tonga	Tonga (13:56)	Tonga (16:53)	—N/a	Ishii (20:07)	Tonga (16:28)	Tonga (14:32)	Tonga (13:18)
Ishii	White (22:02)	Taichi (15:21)	Ishii (20:07)	—N/a	Ishii (12:35)	O-Khan (12:59)	Owens (16:50)
Sanada	White (18:07)	Sanada (16:09)	Tonga (16:28)	Ishii (12:35)	—N/a	Sanada (16:35)	Sanada (12:45)
O-Khan	White (18:14)	O-Khan (7:06)	Tonga (14:32)	O-Khan (12:59)	Sanada (16:35)	—N/a	Owens (11:58)
Owens	White (13:12)	Taichi (13:25)	Tonga (13:18)	Owens (16:50)	Sanada (12:45)	Owens (11:58)	—N/a
Block C	Tanahashi	Naito	Evil	Goto	Sabre	Kenta	Henare
Tanahashi	—N/a	Tanahashi (22:22)	Tanahashi (19:01)	Goto (19:01)	Tanahashi (17:32)	Kenta (23:46)	Henare (11:11)
Naito	Tanahashi (22:22)	—N/a	Naito (24:54)	Goto (22:41)	Naito (1:58)	Naito (23:30)	Naito (17:31)
Evil	Tanahashi (19:01)	Naito (24:54)	—N/a	Evil (8:40)	Sabre (0:44)	Evil (10:13)	Evil (10:28)
Goto	Goto (19:01)	Goto (22:41)	Evil (8:40)	—N/a	Sabre (17:31)	Kenta (18:08)	Goto (17:12)
Sabre	Tanahashi (17:32)	Naito (1:58)	Sabre (0:44)	Sabre (17:31)	—N/a	Sabre (21:33)	Sabre (14:15)
Kenta	Kenta (23:46)	Naito (23:30)	Evil (10:13)	Kenta (18:08)	Sabre (21:33)	—N/a	Kenta (12:35)
Henare	Henare (11:11)	Naito (17:31)	Evil (10:28)	Goto (17:12)	Sabre (14:15)	Kenta (12:35)	—N/a
Block D	Ospreay	Takagi	Robinson	Yoshi-Hashi	Phantasmo	Takahashi	Finlay
Ospreay	—N/a	Takagi (21:55)	Ospreay (11:07)	Ospreay (18:48)	Ospreay (15:06)	Ospreay (11:17)	Finlay (15:28)
Takagi	Takagi (21:55)	—N/a	Robinson (21:33)	Takagi (17:28)	Phantasmo (12:12)	Takagi (15:24)	Finlay (14:50)
Robinson	Ospreay (11:07)	Robinson (21:33)	—N/a	Yoshi-Hashi (12:16)	Robinson (16:09)	Takahashi (11:36)	Finlay (24:01)
Yoshi-Hashi	Ospreay (18:48)	Takagi (17:28)	Yoshi-Hashi (12:16)	—N/a	Yoshi-Hashi (15:47)	Takahashi (13:12)	Yoshi-Hashi (11:14)
Phantasmo	Ospreay (15:06)	Phantasmo (12:12)	Robinson (16:09)	Yoshi-Hashi (15:47)	—N/a	Phantasmo (15:39)	Phantasmo (14:23)
Takahashi	Ospreay (11:17)	Takagi (15:24)	Takahashi (11:36)	Takahashi (13:12)	Phantasmo (15:39)	—N/a	Takahashi (12:59)
Finlay	Finlay (15:28)	Finlay (14:50)	Finlay (24:01)	Yoshi-Hashi (11:14)	Phantasmo (14:23)	Takahashi (12:59)	—N/a

Semifinals
A1	Kazuchika Okada	Pin
B1	Tama Tonga	19:08
C1	Tetsuya Naito	20:23
D1	Will Ospreay	Pin

Final
A1	Kazuchika Okada	Pin
D1	Will Ospreay	33:53
