= Fighting Spirit Unleashed (2020) =

Professional wrestling event tour

- Promotion: New Japan Pro-Wrestling
- Brand: NJPW Strong
- Date: September 4–11, 2020
- City: Port Hueneme, California
- Venue: Oceanview Pavilion
- Attendance: 0 (Note: Held without fans due to the COVID-19 pandemic.)

Event chronology
← Previous; Summer Struggle in Jingu	Next → Lion's Break Crown; Power Struggle

New Japan Pro-Wrestling of America event chronology
← Previous; First	Next → NJPW Resurgence

Fighting Spirit Unleashed chronology
← Previous; 2019	Next → 2021

Fighting Spirit Unleashed (2020) was a two-week professional wrestling event promoted by New Japan Pro-Wrestling (NJPW). The two events took place from September 4 to 11, 2020 at the Oceanview Pavilion in Port Hueneme, California.

It was the third event held under the Fighting Spirit Unleashed name, and was a taping for New Japan Pro-Wrestling of America (NJoA)'s weekly streaming show, NJPW Strong.

== Storylines ==
Fighting Spirit Unleashed featured professional wrestling matches on each show that involved different wrestlers from pre-existing scripted feuds and storylines. Wrestlers portray villains, heroes, or less distinguishable characters in the scripted events that build tension and culminate in a wrestling match or series of matches.

== Results ==
Week 1 (Strong, September 4)
No.	Results	Stipulations	Times
1	Alex Zayne and Fred Rosser defeated The DKC and Clark Connors	Tag team match	7:37
2	Karl Fredericks defeated Misterioso	Singles match	6:37
3	Hikuleo defeated Brody King	Singles match	7:35
4	Jay White defeated Flip Gordon	Singles match	10:22

Week 2 (Strong, September 11)
No.	Results	Stipulations	Times
1	TJP and A. C. H. defeated Adrian Quest and Logan Riegel	Tag team match	9:23
2	Rocky Romero defeated Danny Limelight by submission	Singles match	8:12
3	Guerillas of Destiny (Tama Tonga and Tanga Loa) defeated David Finlay and P. J. Black	Tag team match	9:24
4	Kenta (c) defeated Jeff Cobb	Singles match for the IWGP United States Heavyweight Championship challenge rights certificate	17:57
(c) / – the champion(s) heading into the match
