= Fighting Spirit Unleashed (2024) =

2024 New Japan Pro-Wrestling event

- Promotional poster
- Promotion: New Japan Pro-Wrestling
- Brand: NJPW Strong
- Date: November 8, 2024
- City: Lowell, Massachusetts
- Venue: Lowell Memorial Auditorium

Event chronology
| ← Previous; Power Struggle | Next → Historic X-Over 2 |

Fighting Spirit Unleashed chronology
| ← Previous; 2023 | Next → — |

Fighting Spirit Unleashed (2024) was a professional wrestling event promoted by New Japan Pro-Wrestling (NJPW). It took place at the Lowell Memorial Auditorium in Lowell, Massachusetts on November 8, 2024. It was the seventh event held under the Fighting Spirit Unleashed name. Wrestlers from NJPW's partner promotion All Elite Wrestling (AEW) also were featured on the card.

== Production ==
=== Background ===
The show features professional wrestling matches that result from scripted storylines, where wrestlers portray villains, heroes, or less distinguishable characters in the scripted events that build tension and culminate in a wrestling match or series of matches.

== Results ==
| No. | Results | Stipulations | Times |
|---|---|---|---|
| 1^{P} | Matt Vandagriff defeated Seabass Finn | STRONG Survivor match | 5:31 |
| 2 | David Finlay defeated Kevin Knight | Singles match | 9:29 |
| 3 | Grizzled Young Veterans (James Drake and Zack Gibson) defeated TMDK (Mikey Nicholls and Shane Haste) (c) | Tag team match for the Strong Openweight Tag Team Championship | 9:56 |
| 4 | Lio Rush defeated Mustafa Ali | Singles match | 10:08 |
| 5 | West Coast Wrecking Crew (Jorel Nelson and Royce Isaacs) defeated Dirty Work (Tom Lawlor and Fred Rosser) | Best 2-out-of-3-falls Tag team match | 15:33 |
| 6 | Hazuki defeated Anna Jay, Koguma, and Trish Adora | Four-way match to determine the #1 contender for the Strong Women's Championship | 8:57 |
| 7 | Los Ingobernables de Japon (Shingo Takagi and Yota Tsuji) defeated Undisputed Kingdom (Matt Taven and Mike Bennett) | Tag team match | 10:55 |
| 8 | Ryohei Oiwa defeated Kenta | Singles match | 9:26 |
| 9 | Shota Umino and Tomohiro Ishii defeated TMDK (Zack Sabre Jr. and Bad Dude Tito) | Tag team match | 13:27 |
| 10 | Konosuke Takeshita (c) defeated TJP | Singles match for the AEW International Championship | 14:13 |
| 11 | Gabe Kidd (c) defeated Kosei Fujita | Singles match for the Strong Openweight Championship | 18:40 |
(c) / – the champion(s) heading into the match; P / – the match was broadcast on the pre-show
