= Fighting Spirit Unleashed (2018) =

2018 New Japan Pro-Wrestling event

- Official event logo
- Promotion: New Japan Pro-Wrestling
- Date: September 30, 2018
- City: Long Beach, California
- Venue: Walter Pyramid
- Attendance: 3,007

Event chronology
← Previous; Destruction	Next → New Japan Road: Ganbaro! Uonuma; King of Pro-Wrestling

Fighting Spirit Unleashed chronology
← Previous; First	Next → 2019

Fighting Spirit Unleashed was a professional wrestling event promoted by New Japan Pro-Wrestling (NJPW). The event took place on September 30, 2018, at the Walter Pyramid in Long Beach, California. It was the fifth event produced by NJPW in the United States and the first under the Fighting Spirit Unleashed branch.

Wrestlers from U.S. promotion Ring of Honor (ROH) - with which NJPW has a partnership - also appeared on the card.

== Production ==
=== Background ===
On July 6, 2018, NJPW announced their return to the United States to host two events in the state of California: Fighting Spirit Unleashed, in Long Beach, on September 30 and Lion's Break: Project 1, in Anaheim, on November 10 and 11.

The event aired on tape delay in the United States on October 5, 2018 on AXS TV. As the usual AXS TV commentator Josh Barnett will be unable to attend the event, commentary will be provided by Jim Ross and his replacement Kevin Kelly. Worldwide, the event will be streamed live on NJPW's streaming service, NJPW World.

On August 28, 2018, New Japan Pro-Wrestling announced several wrestlers for the event with soon-to-be-announced matches at Fighting Spirit Unleashed.

=== Storylines ===
Fighting Spirit Unleashed will feature eight to ten professional wrestling matches that will involve different wrestlers from pre-existing scripted feuds and storylines. Wrestlers portray villains, heroes, or less distinguishable characters in the scripted events that build tension and culminate in a wrestling match or series of matches.

On the final day of the G1 Climax, Cody pinned the IWGP United States Heavyweight Champion Juice Robinson and got the victory in a tag team match featuring he and Hangman Page versus Robinson and David Finlay. Afterwards he proceeded to challenge Robinson for his title, setting up the match for this event.

At the G1 Special in San Francisco, Kenny Omega defeated Cody in a singles match for the IWGP Heavyweight Championship. It seemingly ended the civil war within their stable, Bullet Club, that had originated on the second day of The New Beginning in Sapporo. After the Young Bucks (Nick and Matt Jackson) stepped into the ring to congratulate Omega, the Guerrillas of Destiny (Tama Tonga and Tanga Loa) and their father King Haku appeared on the stage and turned on various other Bullet Club members, including Hangman Page, Marty Scurll, Yujiro Takahashi, Chase Owens and Cody, forming a new Bullet Club subgroup in the process: Bullet Club OG. On the final day of the G1 Climax, the Bullet Club OG (Tonga, Loa and Taiji Ishimori) defeated the Bullet Club Elite (Nick Jackson, Matt Jackson and Marty Scurll) to win the NEVER Openweight 6-Man Tag Team Championship. The Young Bucks will now defend the IWGP Tag Team Championship against the Guerrillas of Destiny.

At the G1 Special in San Francisco, the IWGP Junior Heavyweight Champion Hiromu Takahashi injured his neck in a title defense against Dragon Lee. He was forced to relinquish the title, with a four-man tournament being announced to crown a new champion. Will Ospreay will face Marty Scurll in the second semifinal, with the winner advancing to the final to be held at King of Pro-Wrestling to face the winner of the first semifinal, Kushida or Bushi). With Kushida defeating Bushi at Destruction in Kobe, Marty Scurll will face Kushida in the finals.

== Results ==
No.	Results	Stipulations	Times
1^{D}	Clark Connors defeated Alex Coughlin by referee stoppage	Singles match	7:33
2	Taguchi Japan (Jushin Thunder Liger, Ryusuke Taguchi and A. C. H.) defeated Roppongi 3K (Rocky Romero, Sho and Yoh)	Six-man tag team match	8:55
3	The Addiction (Christopher Daniels and Frankie Kazarian) defeated Bullet Club Elite (Hangman Page and Chase Owens)	Tag team match	8:14
4	Jeff Cobb, Chris Sabin and Flip Gordon defeated Chaos (Hirooki Goto, Beretta and Chuckie T.)	Six-man tag team match	12:04
5	Suzuki-gun (Zack Sabre Jr., Lance Archer and Davey Boy Smith Jr.) defeated Los Ingobernables de Japón (Tetsuya Naito, Sanada and Evil)	Six-man tag team match	9:27
6	Jay White and Gedo defeated Taguchi Japan (Hiroshi Tanahashi and Kushida)	Tag team match	8:52
7	Marty Scurll defeated Will Ospreay	IWGP Junior Heavyweight Championship tournament semifinal match	16:08
8	Guerrillas of Destiny (Tama Tonga and Tanga Loa) (with Haku) defeated The Young Bucks (Matt Jackson and Nick Jackson) (c)	Tag team match for the IWGP Tag Team Championship	19:21
9	Cody (with Brandi Rhodes) defeated Juice Robinson (c)	Singles match for the IWGP United States Heavyweight Championship	16:45
10	Golden☆Lovers (Kenny Omega and Kota Ibushi) defeated Chaos (Kazuchika Okada and Tomohiro Ishii)	Tag team match	23:06
(c) / – the champion(s) heading into the match; D / – this was a dark match
