= Fighting Spirit Unleashed (2023) =

2023 New Japan Pro-Wrestling event

- Promotional poster
- Promotion: New Japan Pro-Wrestling
- Brand: NJPW Strong
- Date: October 28, 2023
- City: Las Vegas, Nevada
- Venue: Sam's Town Live
- Attendance: 801

Event chronology
← Previous; Royal Quest III	Next → Power Struggle

Fighting Spirit Unleashed chronology
← Previous; 2022	Next → 2024

Fighting Spirit Unleashed (2023) was a professional wrestling event promoted by New Japan Pro-Wrestling (NJPW). It took place at the Sam's Town Live venue in Las Vegas, Nevada on October 28, 2023. It was the sixth event held under the Fighting Spirit Unleashed name. Besides wrestlers from NJPW, the show featured talent from Consejo Mundial de Lucha Libre (CMLL).

== Production ==
=== Background ===
In October 2019, NJPW announced their expansion into the United States with their new American division, New Japan Pro-Wrestling of America (NJoA). On July 31, 2020, NJPW announced a new weekly series titled NJPW Strong; the series would be produced by NJoA. On January 30, 2023, NJPW announced that all of the promotion's future American events would be branded under the "Strong" name. Beginning with Battle in the Valley on February 18, the NJoA PPVs began airing as NJPW Strong Live; these PPV events will later air on NJPW World as part of the NJPW Strong on Demand series.

On July 12, 2023, NJPW announced that Fighting Spirit Unleashed will he held at Sam's Town Live in Las Vegas, Nevada, United States as a one-night event.

=== Storylines ===
Fighting Spirit Unleashed featured professional wrestling matches on each show that involved different wrestlers from pre-existing scripted feuds and storylines. Wrestlers portray villains, heroes, or less distinguishable characters in the scripted events that build tension and culminate in a wrestling match or series of matches.

On August 12, 2023, after NJPW Strong Openweight Champion Eddie Kingston was victorious in an eight-man tag team match, Henare came to the ring and attacked Kingston. The following day, after an eight-man tag team match, Kingston attacked Henare. The two brawled to the back, where Kingston suggested that they faced each other for the Strong Openweight Championship at Fighting Spirit Unleashed.

At Stardom in Korakuen Hall on October 1 2023, after Giulia successfully defend the NJPW Strong Women's Championship against Ami Sourei, Hyan, challenged Giulia to a title match at Fighting Spirit Unleashed, which she accepted.

After Shingo Takagi defeated Tomohiro Ishii at Royal Quest III, he was confronted by the NEVER Openweight Champion Tama Tonga, who challenged him to a match for his title, thus setting up the match at Fighting Spirit Unleashed.

== Event ==
The event started with two preshow confrontations. In the first one, Matt Vandagriff defeated Buck Skynyr in singles competition. In the next match, Jorel Nelson, Royce Isaacs and Danny Limelight picked up a victory over Baliyan Akki, Titus Alexander and Jakob Austin Young in six-man tag team action.

In the first main card match, Satoshi Kojima defeated Fred Rosser, Jeff Cobb and Alex Coughlin to become the number one contender for the Strong Openweight Championship.

Next, Zeuxis and Stephanie Vaquer defeated Lluvia and Johnnie Robbie. After the match, Stephanie challenged IWGP Women's Champion, Mayu Iwatani, to meet her for the gold on November 10 at NJPW Lonestar Shootout.

In the fifth match, Tom Lawlor defeated Gabe Kidd in singles competition.

In the sixth match, Hiroshi Tanahashi, Místico, Atlantis and Atlantis Jr. defeated Rocky Romero, Tiger Mask, Soberano Jr. and Adrian Quest in a six-man tag team match which was dubbed as Atlantis' 40th Anniversary of his career.

In the seventh match, Giulia defeated Hyan to secure the fifth consecutive defence in her Strong Women's Championship title reign. She would later receive a challenge from Trish Adora while backstage.

In the eighth match, Hikuleo and El Phantasmo defeated Alex Zayne and Lance Archer to retain the Strong Openweight Tag Team Championship for the first time. After the match, the champions were attacked by the West Coast Wrecking Crew.

In the seventh match, Eddie Kingston defeated Henare in his sixth consecutive defence of the Strong Openweight Championship.

In the penultimate match, IWGP World Heavyweight Champion Sanada and Yuya Uemura went into a time-limit draw against Tetsuya Naito and IWGP Junior Heavyweight Champion Hiromu Takahashi. While the latter was going to the backstage area, Danny Limelight unsuccessfully tried to pin Takahashi for the Ironman Heavymetalweight Championship.

In the main event, Shingo Takagi defeated Tama Tonga to win the NEVER Openweight Championship. After the match, Takagi asked for fresh confrontation and competition. Trent Beretta appeared via video and challenged him to a matchup for NJPW Lonestar Shootout.

== Results ==
No.	Results	Stipulations	Times
1^{P}	Matt Vandagriff defeated Buck Skynyr by pinfall	Singles match	5:37
2^{P}	Team Filthy (Danny Limelight and West Coast Wrecking Crew (Jorel Nelson and Royce Isaacs)) defeated Titus Alexander, Jakob Austin Young and Baliyan Akki by pinfall	Six-man tag team match	6:53
3	Satoshi Kojima defeated Jeff Cobb, Alex Coughlin and Fred Rosser by pinfall	Four-way match to determine the #1 contender to the Strong Openweight Championship	9:50
4	Zeuxis and Stephanie Vaquer defeated Lluvia and Johnnie Robbie by pinfall	Tag team match	7:40
5	Tom Lawlor defeated Gabe Kidd (with Alex Coughlin) by pinfall	Singles match	12:30
6	Hiroshi Tanahashi, Místico, Atlantis Jr. and Atlantis defeated Rocky Romero, Tiger Mask, Soberano Jr. and Adrian Quest by pinfall	Eight-man tag team match	10:25
7	Giulia (c) defeated Hyan by pinfall	Singles match for the Strong Women's Championship	12:03
8	Guerrillas of Destiny (Hikuleo and El Phantasmo) (c) defeated Monstersauce (Alex Zayne and Lance Archer) by pinfall	Tag team match for the Strong Openweight Tag Team Championship	8:10
9	Eddie Kingston (c) defeated Henare by pinfall	Singles match for the Strong Openweight Championship	12:16
10	Just 5 Guys (Yuya Uemura and Sanada) vs. Los Ingobernables de Japon (Tetsuya Naito and Hiromu Takahashi) ended in a time-limit draw	Tag team match	20:00
11	Shingo Takagi defeated Tama Tonga (c) by pinfall	Singles match for the NEVER Openweight Championship	26:58
(c) / – the champion(s) heading into the match; P / – the match was broadcast on the pre-show
