= Yoshi-Hashi =

Japanese professional wrestler (born 1982)

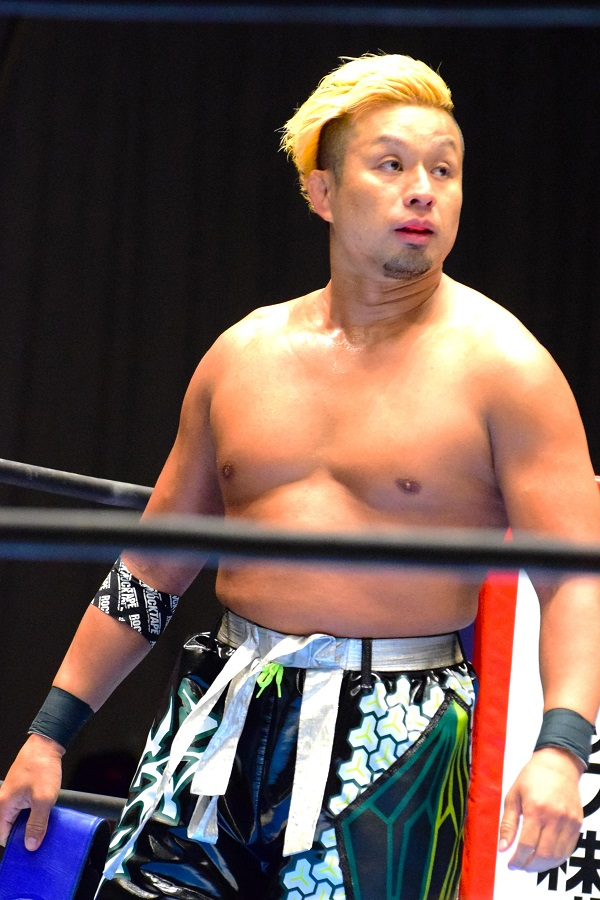
- Yoshi-Hashi in July 2023

Personal information
- Born: Nobuo Yoshihashi; May 25, 1982 (age 44) Togo, Aichi
- Spouse: Ayumi Kurihara

Professional wrestling career
- Ring name(s): Nobuo Yoshihashi; Yoshi-Hashi; Yoshihashi
- Billed height: 1.80 m (5 ft 11 in)
- Billed weight: 102 kg (225 lb)
- Trained by: Animal Hamaguchi; NJPW Dojo; Jado
- Debut: July 6, 2008

Nobuo Yoshihashi (吉橋 伸雄, Yoshihashi Nobuo; born May 25, 1982) is a Japanese professional wrestler, signed to New Japan Pro-Wrestling (NJPW), where he performs under the ring name Yoshi-Hashi (stylized in all caps as YOSHI-HASHI) and is one-half of Bishamon alongside Hirooki Goto. He is a former four-time IWGP Tag Team Champion, with Hirooki Goto; as well as being a former NEVER Openweight 6-Man Tag Team Champion with Hirooki Goto and Tomohiro Ishii, a team which holds the record for the longest reign with the titles.

== Professional wrestling career ==
=== New Japan Pro-Wrestling (2008–2010) ===
In 2005, Yoshihashi tried to earn a training spot in the New Japan Pro-Wrestling (NJPW) dojo but failed to pass an introductory test. He was eventually accepted into the dojo, after passing the test on his third attempt, and made his professional wrestling debut on July 6, 2008, losing to Tetsuya Naito. Although not competing in the 2008 G1 Climax, he did wrestle on many of the G1 Climax shows. Yoshihashi did not pick up any wins in NJPW in 2008. This is normal for rookies in the promotion. However, on making his Riki Pro debut on November 3 he teamed up with Kazuchika Okada to beat the team of Kuniyoshi Wada and Yusaku Obata. On February 12, 2009, Yoshihashi won his first match in NJPW by teaming with Hiroshi Tanahashi and Yuji Nagata and defeating Kazuchika Okada, Hirooki Goto and Shinsuke Nakamura. After this, however, he lost almost all of his matches in 2009. On November 4, Yoshihashi teamed up with Koji Kanemoto in a losing effort against then-IWGP Junior Heavyweight Tag Team Champions Apollo 55. In 2010, Yoshihashi began winning many more matches for NJPW. He teamed up with Jyushin Thunder Liger to participate in the first Super J Tag Tournament, however, the pair lost in the first round and were eliminated. He also participated in the 2010 Best of the Super Juniors tournament. Though Yoshihashi picked up his first-ever singles victory in NJPW against junior legend Akira, he lost all of his other matches in the tournament and thus failed to progress to the semifinals. His last match for NJPW before leaving was a loss with Liger against Davey Richards and La Sombra.

=== Consejo Mundial de Lucha Libre (2010–2011) ===
Yoshihashi joined Consejo Mundial de Lucha Libre in 2010 as a way to gain more experience and be exposed to a variety of wrestling syles. His first match was a six-man two out of three falls match with La Ola Amarilla ("The Yellow Wave"; Okumura and Taichi) losing to El Hijo del Fantasma, La Mascara, and Máximo. For the rest of 2010 and the entire year of 2011 Yoshihashi wrestled in six-man two out of three falls matches and rarely participated in anything else. He lost most of his matches for CMLL in both 2010 and 2011. Near the end of his stay in Mexico Yoshihashi started a storyline with CMLL mainstay Rush that started in six-man tag team matches and soon escalated to the point where the two agreed to both bet their hair in a Lucha de Apuestas ("Bet Match"), which in Mexico is more important than Championship matches. On August 1, 2011, Rush defeated Yoshihashi and then forced him to have his hair shaved off as per the stipulation.

=== Return to NJPW (2012–present) ===
In late 2011, it was announced that Yoshihashi would be returning to NJPW on January 4, 2012, at Wrestle Kingdom VI in Tokyo Dome, now working under the ring name "Yoshi-Hashi" (stylized in all capital letters). Prior to his return, Yoshi-Hashi announced that he had joined the Chaos stable due to becoming accustomed to portraying a rudo (a villain) in Mexico. On January 4, 2012, Yoshi-Hashi was defeated in his return match by his old nemesis from his early career, Kazuchika Okada, who won the match in under five minutes. Yoshi-Hashi appeared at The New Beginning and NJPW 40th Anniversary Show teaming with members of Chaos and won both matches. On April 1, he was defeated by La Sombra in the first round of the New Japan Cup. At Wrestling Dontaku 2012, Yoshi-Hashi along with Jado and Tomohiro Ishii defeated Captain New Japan, Strong Man and Tama Tonga. At Dominion 6.16, Yoshi-Hashi teamed with Tomohiro Ishii and Rocky Romero defeated Captain New Japan and Seigigun members Wataru Inoue and Yuji Nagata. From November 20 to December 1, Yoshi-Hashi took part in the round-robin portion of the 2012 World Tag League, alongside stablemate Kazuchika Okada under the team name "Chaos Ride the Lightning". The team finished with a record of three wins and three losses, with a loss to "Sword & Guns" (Karl Anderson and Hirooki Goto) on the final day, costing them a spot in the semifinals of the tournament. Yoshi-Hashi and Okada reunited a year later for the 2013 World Tag League, this time finishing second to last in their block with a record of two wins and four losses. On September 5, 2014, Yoshi-Hashi picked up a major win, when he led Chaos to a ten-man elimination tag team match win over their rival Bullet Club stable. Following the win, Yoshi-Hashi was granted a shot at two different championships held by Bullet Club; the NEVER Openweight Championship and the IWGP Tag Team Championship. On September 21 at Destruction in Kobe, Yoshi-Hashi and Kazuchika Okada unsuccessfully challenged Doc Gallows and Karl Anderson for the IWGP Tag Team Championship. Two days later at Destruction in Okayama, Yoshi-Hashi also failed to capture the NEVER Openweight Championship from Yujiro Takahashi. In November, Yoshi-Hashi once again teamed up with Okada for the 2014 World Tag League. The team finished their block with a record of four wins and three losses, failing to advance to the finals.

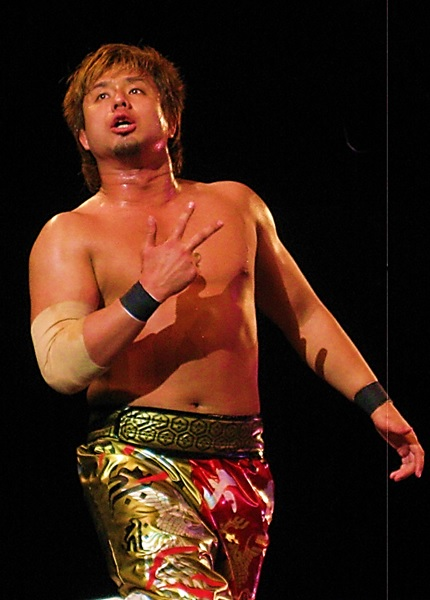
Yoshi-Hashi in March 2015

In mid-2016, through Chaos' rivalry with the Los Ingobernables de Japón (L.I.J.) stable, Yoshi-Hashi found himself a rival in NJPW newcomer Sanada. The two had a history dating back to 2005, when they took part in NJPW's introductory test together. While both failed to pass the test, Yoshi-Hashi felt that Sanada was a quitter for seeking employment in another promotion (All Japan Pro Wrestling), while he himself repeated the test until passing it in his third attempt. On June 19 at Dominion 6.19 in Osaka-jo Hall, Yoshi-Hashi scored arguably the biggest win of his career at that point by submitting Sanada in a tag team match, where he teamed with Chaos stablemate Tomohiro Ishii and Sanada with L.I.J. stablemate Bushi. Following the win, Yoshi-Hashi was granted entry into the 2016 G1 Climax, his first G1 Climax tournament. In his opening match in the tournament on July 22, Yoshi-Hashi scored another big win over Kenny Omega. On August 13, he finished the tournament last in his block with a record of three wins and six losses. Despite this, Yoshi-Hashi's opening match win resulted in Omega, after winning the entire tournament, nominating him as his first challenger for the Tokyo Dome IWGP Heavyweight Championship match contract. On September 22 at Destruction in Hiroshima, Yoshi-Hashi unsuccessfully challenged Omega for the contract. On November 5 at Power Struggle, Yoshi-Hashi teamed with Tomohiro Ishii to unsuccessfully challenge Tama Tonga and Tanga Loa for the IWGP Tag Team Championship. At the end of the year, Yoshi-Hashi and Okada took part in the 2016 World Tag League, finishing third in their block with a record of four wins and three losses.

On January 4, 2017, at Wrestle Kingdom 11 in Tokyo Dome, Yoshi-Hashi, Jado and Will Ospreay, participated in the first NEVER Openweight 6-Man Tag Team Championship gauntlet match representing Chaos, however, the team was unsuccessful in winning the title after Jado was pinned by Yujiro Takahashi. On January 5, 2017, Yoshi-Hashi pinned Bullet Club member and reigning Ring of Honor (ROH) World Champion Adam Cole in a six-man tag team match, seemingly putting himself in line for a shot at the title. Through NJPW's relationship with Revolution Pro Wrestling, Yoshi-Hashi made his debut for the British promotion on January 21, defeating Pete Dunne. On February 27, during the second night of the Honor Rising: Japan 2017 events, Yoshi-Hashi unsuccessfully challenged Adam Cole for the ROH World Championship. On June 26, Yoshi-Hashi unsuccessfully challenged Minoru Suzuki for the NEVER Openweight Championship. From July 17 to August 11, Yoshi-Hashi took part in the 2017 G1 Climax, where he finished second to last in block A with the record of two wins and seven losses. On October 15 at the NJPW and ROH co-produced Global Wars: Chicago event, Yoshi-Hashi unsuccessfully challenged Kenny Omega for the IWGP United States Heavyweight Championship. At the end of the year, Yoshi-Hashi teamed with Hirooki Goto in the 2017 World Tag League. Finishing with a record of four wins and three losses, the team failed to qualify for the finals, after losing to Evil and Sanada in their final round-robin match.

On August 9, 2020, Yoshi-Hashi, along with fellow Chaos stablemates, Tomohiro Ishii and Hirooki Goto, won the NEVER Openweight 6-Man Tag Team Championship in a tournament final at Summer Struggle in Korakuen Hall. This marked the first-ever title win in his wrestling career, 12 years after his debut in NJPW.

In the 2021 World Tag League, Hiroko Goto and Yoshi-Hashi finished top of the single block league with 18 points. In the tournament finals, they defeated House of Torture (Evil and Yujiro Takahashi) (with help from Tomohiro Ishii after Dick Togo interfered) to win the World Tag League tournament. This would be Goto's third time winning the tournament, but his first as a member of CHAOS. This Yoshi-Hashi's first World Tag League win, and his first major tournament victory in New Japan. On January 4, 2022, at Wrestle Kingdom 16, Yoshi-Hashi and Goto defeated Dangerous Tekkers (Zack Sabre Jr. and Taichi) to win the IWGP World Tag Team titles. On Night 2, Yoshi-Hashi, Goto and Yoh, failed to capture the NEVER Openweight 6-man Tag Team championships from House of Torture.

In March, Yoshi-Hashi competed in the New Japan Cup, defeating Tomoaki Honma and Kosei Fujita, before being defeated by Jeff Cobb in the third round. At Hyper Battle, Yoshi-Hashi and Goto lost the IWGP Tag Team Championships to United Empire's Jeff Cobb and Great-O-Khan. At AEW x NJPW: Forbidden Door, Yoshi-Hashi and Goto competed in the opening match on the Buy-In, defeating Q. T. Marshall and Aaron Solo. This win lead to the pair getting an AEW World Tag Team Championship eliminator match on AEW Rampage, making their AEW debuts against current champions The Young Bucks, which they lost. In June, Yoshi-Hashi was announced to be competing in the G1 Climax 32 tournament in July, as a part of the D Block. He finished the tournament with a total of 6 points, failing to advance to the semi-finals.

In September at Burning Spirit, Yoshi-Hashi, Goto and Yoh, lost the 6-man tag-team championships back to House of Torture. The following month, Yoshi-Hashi participated in a tournament to crown the inaugural NJPW World Television Champion, defeating Jeff Cobb in the first round. In the quarterfinals, Yoshi-Hashi lost to Evil. In November, Bishamon competed in the World Tag League, finishing joint-top of the block and thus advancing to the finals. In the finals, Bishamon defeated Aussie Open (Kyle Fletcher and Mark Davis) to win the tournament for a second year in a row. On January 4 2023, at Wrestle Kingdom 17, the duo defeated FTR to win the IWGP Tag Team Championship for the second time as a tag-team.

Bishamon made their first title defense at The New Beginning in Sapporo in February, defeating TMDK (Mikey Nicholls and Shane Haste). A month later, the duo successfully defended the titles against Kazuchika Okada and Hiroshi Tanahashi. In March, Yoshi-Hashi entered the New Japan Cup but was defeated in the first round by Kyle Fletcher. The victory earned Fletcher and Davis an IWGP Tag Team Championship match against Bishamon, in April at Sakura Genesis, where they lost the titles to Aussie Open, ending their third reign at 94 days.

In June at Dominion 6.4 in Osaka-jo Hall, Bishamon won their third IWGP Heavyweight Tag Team Championship, defeating House of Torture and United Empire to win both the vacant IWGP Tag Team titles and the Strong Openweight Tag Team Championships, thus becoming double champions. Five Days later, Bishamon reunited with Tomohiro Ishii at All Together Again, a joint event between NJPW, Pro Wrestling Noah (NOAH) and All Japan Pro Wrestling (AJPW), to defeat NOAH's Masa Kitamiya, Daiki Inaba and Yoshiki Inamura. On July 4 on night 1 of NJPW Independence Day, Bishamon lost the Strong Openweight Championships, to Bullet Club Wardogs (Alex Coughlin and Gabriel Kidd). The following night in a rematch, the duo defeated Coughlin and Kidd to retain the IWGP Tag Team Championships. The following week, Yoshi-Hashi entered the annual G1 Climax tournament, competing in the B Block. Yoshi-Hashi ended the tournament with 4 points, finishing at the bottom of his block and therefore failing to advance to the quarterfinals.

Bishamon returned to tag-team competition in November, competing in the annual World Tag League, participating in the B-Block. The duo finished with 9 points, making them runner's up in the block, thus advancing them to the semi-finals. In the semi-final round, Bishamon defeated Bullet Club Wardogs (Alex Coughlin and Gabe Kidd). In the tournament finals, Bishamon defeated, Strong Openweight Tag Team Champions, Guerrillas of Destiny (Hikuleo and El Phantasmo), to win their third consecutive NJPW World Tag League, whilst also making them the record winners. Due to them already being IWGP Tag Team Champions, the duo decided to use their World Tag League win to have a title vs title rematch against Guerrillas of Destiny (G.O.D), at Wrestle Kingdom 18. On January 4, 2024, at Wrestle Kingdom. Bishamon was defeated by G.O.D, ending the team's third IWGP Tag Team title reign at 214 days.

In March, Yoshi-Hashi competed in the annual New Japan Cup, defeating Kenta in the first round. However, in the second round, Yoshi-Hashi lost to the previous year's cup winner, Sanada.

== Championships and accomplishments ==
- New Japan Pro-Wrestling
  - IWGP Tag Team Championship (4 times) – with Hirooki Goto
  - NEVER Openweight 6-Man Tag Team Championship (3 times) – with Hirooki Goto and Tomohiro Ishii (1); Hirooki Goto and Yoh (1) and Hirooki Goto and Boltin Oleg (1)
  - Strong Openweight Tag Team Championship (1 time) – with Hirooki Goto
  - World Tag League (2021, 2022, 2023) – with Hirooki Goto
  - NEVER Openweight Six Man Tag Team Title Tournament (2020) – with Hirooki Goto and Tomohiro Ishii
- Pro Wrestling Illustrated
  - Ranked No. 177 of the top 500 singles wrestlers in the PWI 500 in 2018
- Tokyo Sports
  - Best Tag Team Award (2023) – with Hirooki Goto

== Luchas de Apuestas record ==
| Winner (wager) | Loser (wager) | Location | Event | Date | Notes |
|---|---|---|---|---|---|
| Rush (hair) | Yoshihashi (hair) | Puebla, Puebla | CMLL Lunes Arena Puebla | August 1, 2011 | |
