= Fighting Spirit Unleashed (2022) =

Professional wrestling event

- Promotional poster featuring Jay White, Taiji Ishimori and Fred Rosser
- Promotion: New Japan Pro-Wrestling
- Brand: NJPW Strong
- Date: August 21, 2022 (Aired September 10 – October 1, 2022)
- City: Los Angeles, California
- Venue: The Vermont Hollywood
- Attendance: 287

NJPW Strong chronology
← Previous; NJPW Strong 2nd Anniversary Special	Next → Autumn Auction 2022

Fighting Spirit Unleashed chronology
← Previous; 2021	Next → 2023

New Japan Pro-Wrestling chronology
← Previous; G1 Climax 32; Music City Mayhem	Next → Burning Spirit

Fighting Spirit Unleashed (2022) was a professional wrestling event promoted by New Japan Pro-Wrestling (NJPW). The event consisted of four different episodes taped on the same day and in front of the same audience at The Vermont Hollywood in Los Angeles, California on August 21, 2022, and aired between September 10 and October 1.

The event was a taping for New Japan Pro-Wrestling of America (NJoA)'s weekly series, NJPW Strong, and it was the fifth event held under the Fighting Spirit Unleashed name.

== Storylines ==
Fighting Spirit Unleashed featured professional wrestling matches on each show that involved different wrestlers from pre-existing scripted feuds and storylines. Wrestlers portray villains, heroes, or less distinguishable characters in the scripted events that build tension and culminate in a wrestling match or series of matches.

== Results ==
Week 1 (September 10)
No.	Results	Stipulations	Times
1	Máscara Dorada defeated Misterioso	Singles match	9:41
2	Robbie Eagles defeated Kevin Blackwood	Singles match	11:32
3	Aussie Open (Kyle Fletcher and Mark Davis) (c) defeated West Coast Wrecking Crew (Jorel Nelson and Royce Isaacs)	Tag team match for the Strong Openweight Tag Team Championship	11:38
(c) / – the champion(s) heading into the match

Week 2 (September 17)
No.	Results	Stipulations	Times
1	Peter Avalon defeated Adrian Quest	Singles match	8:52
2	Team Filthy (J. R. Kratos and Tom Lawlor) defeated Jordan Cruz and Cody Chhun	Tag team match	9:54
3	Bullet Club (Hikuleo, Chase Owens, Juice Robinson, and Jay White) defeated Taylor Rust, Roppongi Vice (Trent Beretta and Rocky Romero), and Kushida	Eight-man tag team match	14:46

Week 3 (September 24)
No.	Results	Stipulations	Times
1	QT Marshall defeated Keita	Singles match	5:12
2	TMDK (Bad Dude Tito and Shane Haste) defeated Christopher Daniels and Yuya Uemura	Tag team match	9:10
3	Ren Narita defeated Jakob Austin Young	Singles match	4:48
4	Taiji Ishimori defeated Alan Angels	Singles match	9:14

Week 4 (October 1)
No.	Results	Stipulations	Times
1	The DKC and Kevin Knight defeated Stray Dog Army (Barrett Brown and Bateman)	Tag team match	8:16
2	Aaron Solo defeated Che Cabrera	Singles match	8:31
3	Fred Rosser (c) defeated TJP	Singles match for the Strong Openweight Championship	17:20
(c) / – the champion(s) heading into the match
