= Fighting Spirit Unleashed (2021) =

Professional wrestling event

- Promotional poster
- Promotion: New Japan Pro-Wrestling
- Brand: NJPW Strong
- Date: August 16, 2021 (Aired September 18, 2021)
- City: Long Beach, California
- Venue: Thunder Studios
- Attendance: 144

Pay-per-view chronology
| ← Previous; Road To Summer Struggle USA 2021; Resurgence | Next → Summer Struggle USA 2021; Wrestle Grand Slam in MetLife Dome |

Fighting Spirit Unleashed chronology
| ← Previous; 2020 | Next → 2022 |

Fighting Spirit Unleashed (2021) was a professional wrestling event promoted by New Japan Pro-Wrestling (NJPW). It was the fourth event held under the Fighting Spirit Unleashed name.

The event was a taping of New Japan Pro-Wrestling of America (NJoA)'s weekly show, NJPW Strong. It consisted of three different episodes taped on the same day and in front of the same audience at Thunder Studios in Long Beach, California on August 16, 2021. The episodes would begin airing from September 18.

== Storylines ==
Fighting Spirit Unleashed featured professional wrestling matches on each show that involved different wrestlers from pre-existing scripted feuds and storylines. Wrestlers portray villains, heroes, or less distinguishable characters in the scripted events that build tension and culminate in a wrestling match or series of matches.

== Results ==
Event 1
| No. | Results | Stipulations | Times |
|---|---|---|---|
| 1 | Tomohiro Ishii defeated Alex Coughlin | Singles match | 9:13 |
| 2 | Clark Connors, Hiroshi Tanahashi and Karl Fredericks defeated Stray Dog Army (Barrett Brown, Bateman and Misterioso) | Six-man tag team match | 13:33 |
| 3 | Hikuleo defeated Juice Robinson | Tables match | 9:57 |

Event 2
| No. | Results | Stipulations | Times |
|---|---|---|---|
| 1 | Yuji Nagata and Yuya Uemura defeated Kevin Knight and The DKC | Tag team match | 9:27 |
| 2 | Jay White defeated Wheeler Yuta | Singles match | 11:29 |
| 3 | Ren Narita defeated Fred Rosser | Singles match | 15:11 |

Event 3
| No. | Results | Stipulations | Times |
|---|---|---|---|
| 1 | J. R. Kratos defeated Fred Yehi | Singles match | 9:13 |
| 2 | Chris Dickinson defeated Royce Isaacs | Singles match | 11:08 |
| 3 | Tom Lawlor (c) (with J. R. Kratos) defeated Lio Rush | Singles match for the Strong Openweight Championship | 16:19 |
(c) / – the champion(s) heading into the match
