= NJPW Burning Spirit =

2022 New Japan Pro-Wrestling professional wrestling event

Burning Spirit
- NJPW Burning Spirit logo
- Promotion: New Japan Pro-Wrestling
- Date: September 25, 2022
- City: Kobe, Japan
- Venue: World Memorial Hall
- Attendance: 3,150

Event chronology
← Previous; Fighting Spirit Unleashed	Next → Royal Quest II

Burning Spirit was a professional wrestling event produced by New Japan Pro-Wrestling (NJPW). It took place on September 25, 2022, in Kobe, Japan at World Memorial Hall.

== Storylines ==
Burning Spirit featured nine professional wrestling matches that involved different wrestlers from pre-existing scripted feuds and storylines. Wrestlers portrayed villains, heroes, or less distinguishable characters in the scripted events that built tension and culminated in a wrestling match or series of matches.

== Results ==
No.	Results	Stipulations	Times
1	Los Ingobernables de Japon (Shingo Takagi, Bushi and Hiromu Takahashi) defeated Bullet Club (Kenta, El Phantasmo and Hikuleo) by pinfall	Six-man tag team match	8:43
2	Toru Yano vs. Doc Gallows ended in a double countout	Singles match	3:45
3	United Empire (Great-O-Khan and Jeff Cobb) defeated General's Jewel (Bad Luck Fale and Chase Owens) by pinfall	Tag team match	7:57
4	Dangerous Tekkers (Taichi and Zack Sabre Jr.) defeated Los Ingobernables de Japon (Tetsuya Naito and Sanada) by pinfall	Tag team match	9:32
5	TMDK (Jonah, Shane Haste and Bad Dude Tito) defeated Kazuchika Okada and Great Bash Heel (Togi Makabe and Tomoaki Honma) by pinfall	Six-man tag team match	12:09
6	Bullet Club (Jay White and Taiji Ishimori) defeated Guerrillas of Destiny (Tama Tonga and Jado (Note: Kushida was initially scheduled to team up with Tonga but later pulled out due to suffering hand, foot, and mouth disease.)) by submission	Tag team match	10:39
7	United Empire (Francesco Akira and TJP) (c) defeated Six or Nine (Ryusuke Taguchi and Master Wato) by pinfall	Tag team match for the IWGP Junior Heavyweight Tag Team Championship	12:43
8	Karl Anderson (c) defeated Hiroshi Tanahashi by pinfall	Singles match for the NEVER Openweight Championship	13:37
9	Will Ospreay (c) defeated David Finlay by pinfall	Singles match for the IWGP United States Heavyweight Championship	28:22
(c) / – the champion(s) heading into the match
