= Lowell Memorial Auditorium =

Multi-use auditorium located in downtown Lowell, Massachusetts

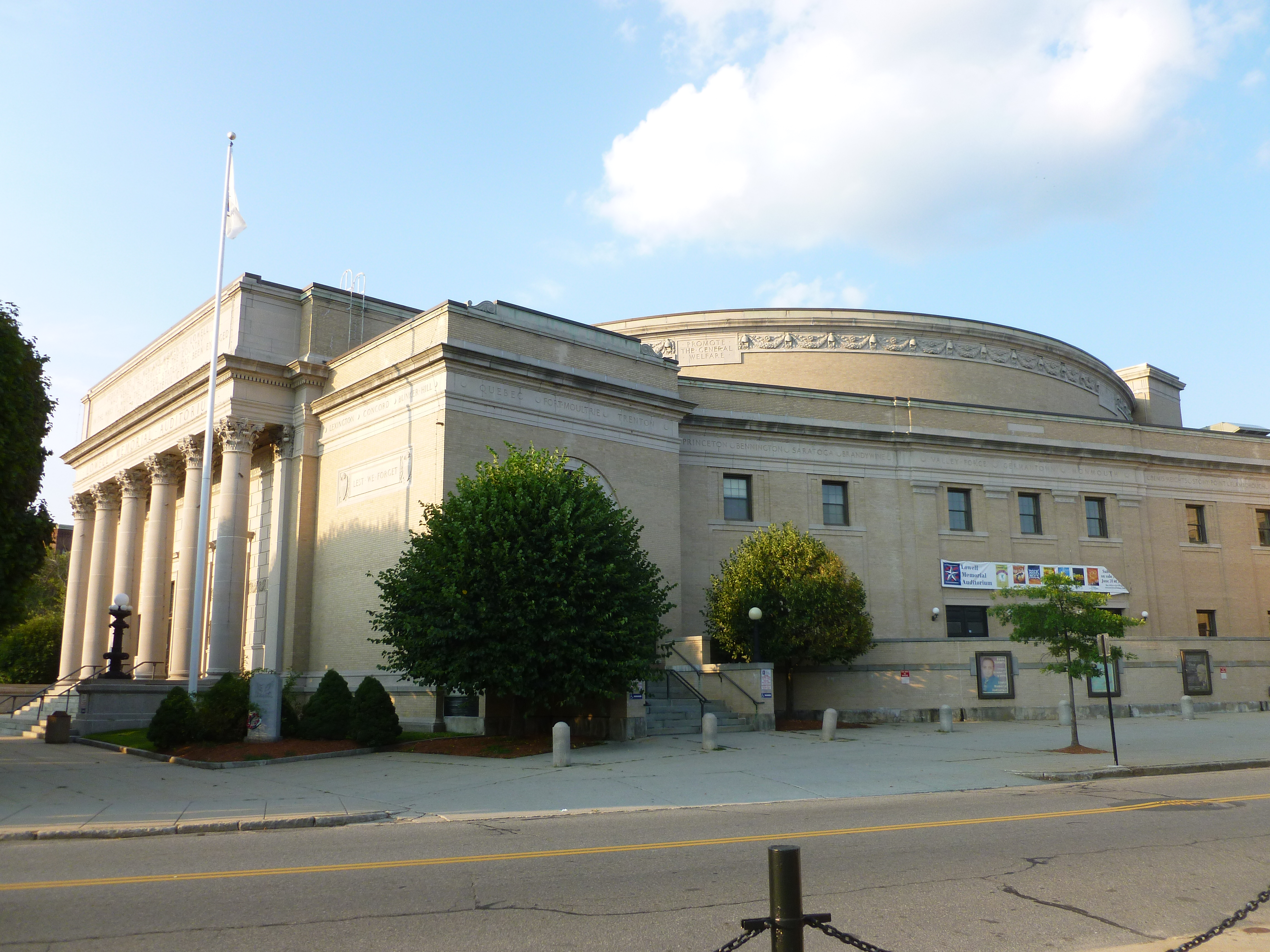
- West (front) side and south side of building, along East Merrimack Street. The frieze lists battles of the American Revolution.
- Interactive map of Lowell Memorial Auditorium
- Address: 50 East Merrimack Street; Lowell, Massachusetts; United States
- Coordinates: 42.645068°N 71.304172°W
- Owner: City of Lowell
- Capacity: 2,800
- Type: Performing Arts Center

Construction
- Opened: 1922
- Years active: 1922–Present
- Architect: Blackall, Clapp & Whittemore

Website
- http://www.lowellauditorium.com

The Lowell Memorial Auditorium is an indoor auditorium in downtown Lowell, Massachusetts, in the United States. It is dedicated to local veterans of war.

The 2,800-seat venue was built in 1922 by the architectural firm of Blackall, Clapp & Whittemore. The exterior walls bear the names of famous generals and battles, with monuments to newer wars on the auditorium's small lawn.

Common events include concerts, comedy acts, large plays, and boxing. Attached to the auditorium is the smaller theatre of the Merrimack Repertory Theatre.

In February 2014, an American flag from the Civil War was discovered in the basement. The flag had been carried by Solon Perkins, a lieutenant in the 2nd Massachusetts Cavalry Regiment, who was killed in the Battle of Clinton, Louisiana, on June 3, 1863. It was given to the Lowell Memorial Auditorium in 1929 by Mary Sawyer Knapp, and now hangs there in the Hall of Flags.

== Gallery ==
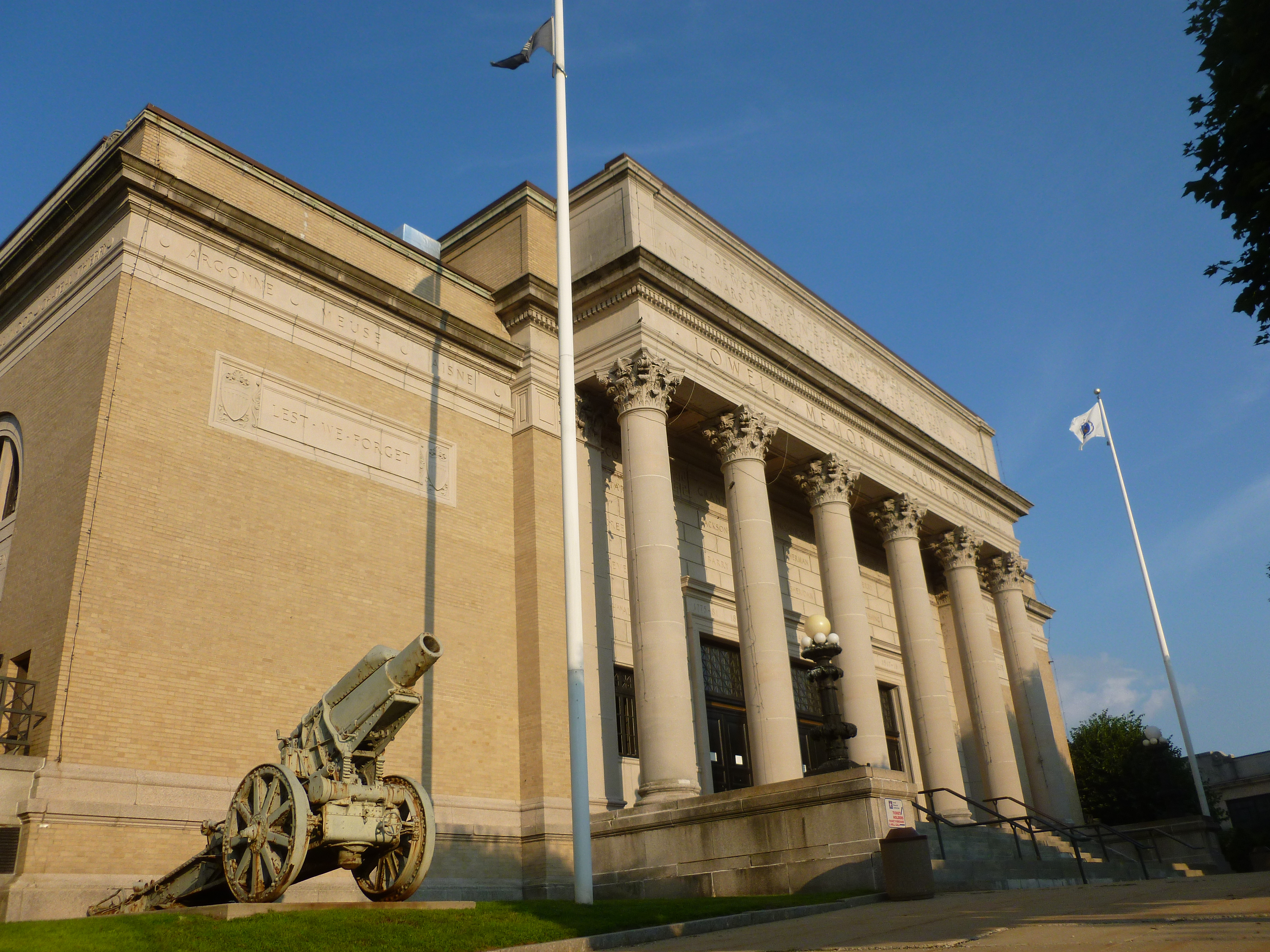
Main entrance, north and west sides

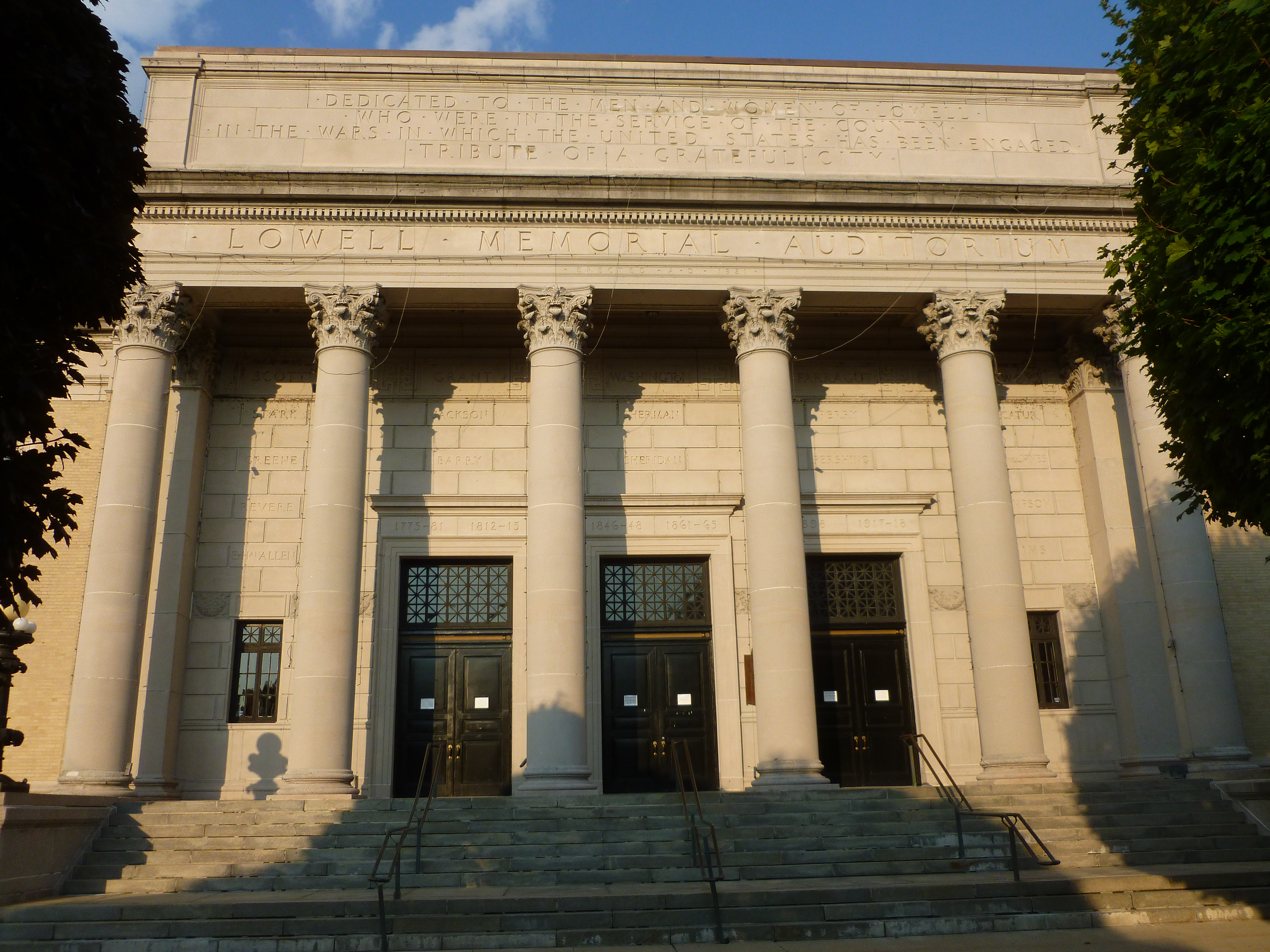
Main entrance, west side

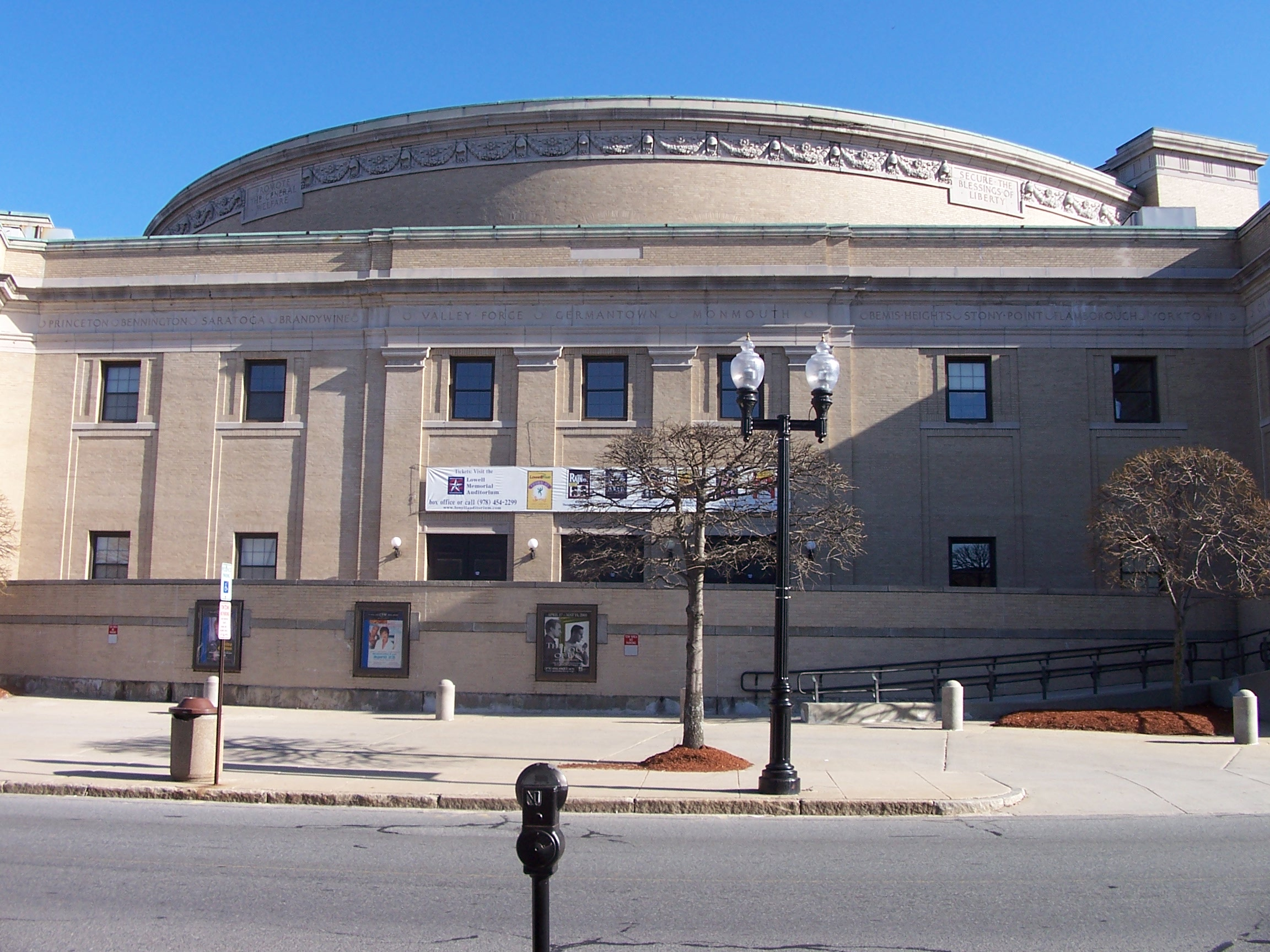
South side

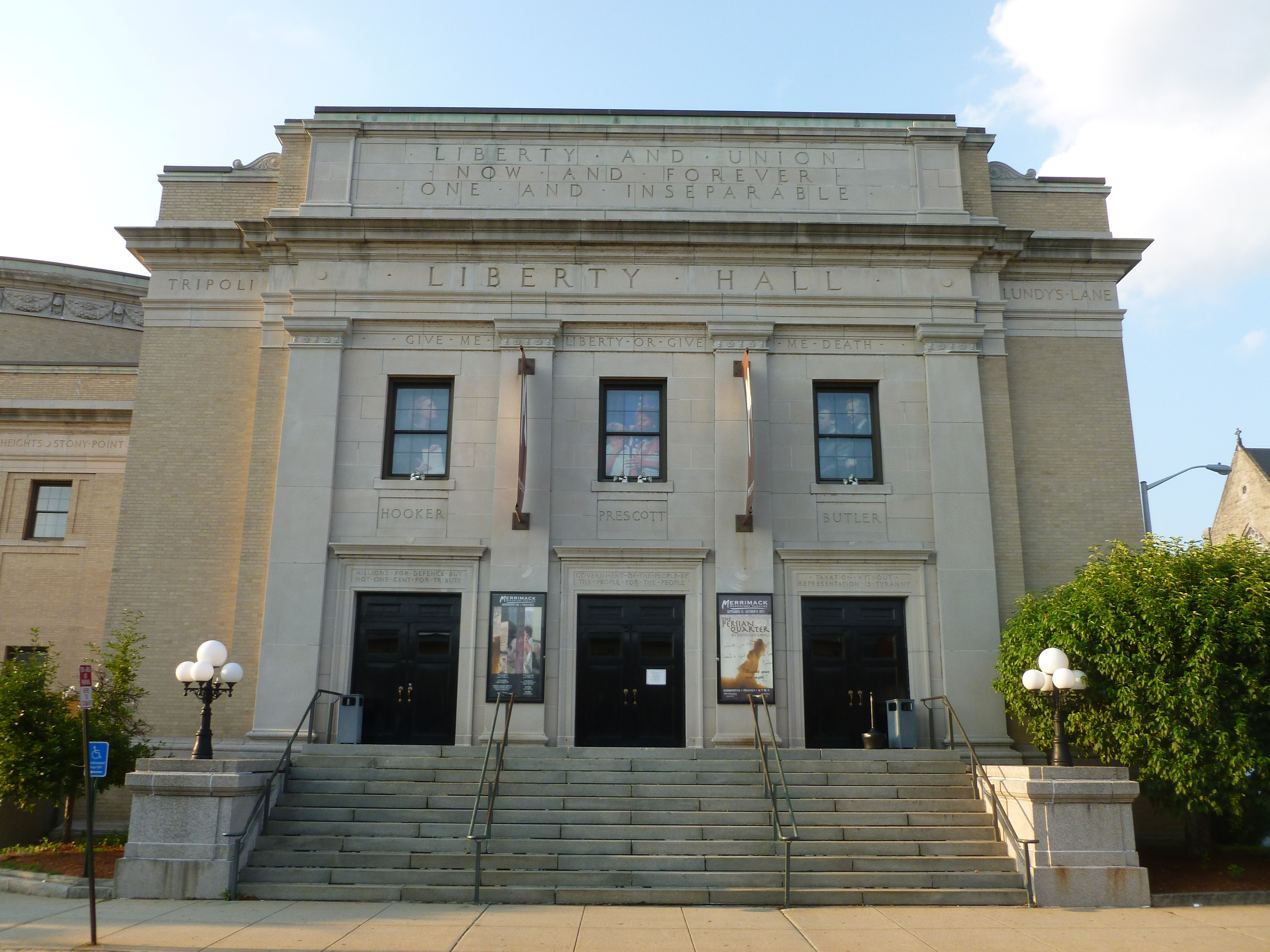
Merrimack Repertory Theatre entrance, south side
