= NJPW Resurgence (2024) =

2024 New Japan Pro-Wrestling professional wrestling event

Resurgence
- Promotional poster
- Promotion: New Japan Pro-Wrestling
- Brand: NJPW Strong
- Date: May 11, 2024
- City: Ontario, California
- Venue: Toyota Arena
- Attendance: 3,024

Event chronology
← Previous; Wrestling Dontaku	Next → Best of the Super Jr. 31; Dominion 6.9 in Osaka-jo Hall

Resurgence chronology
← Previous; 2023	Next → 2025

Resurgence (2024) was a professional wrestling pay-per-view (PPV) event produced by New Japan Pro-Wrestling (NJPW). It took place on May 11, 2024, at the Toyota Arena in Ontario, California. It was the third Resurgence event.

== Production ==
=== Background ===
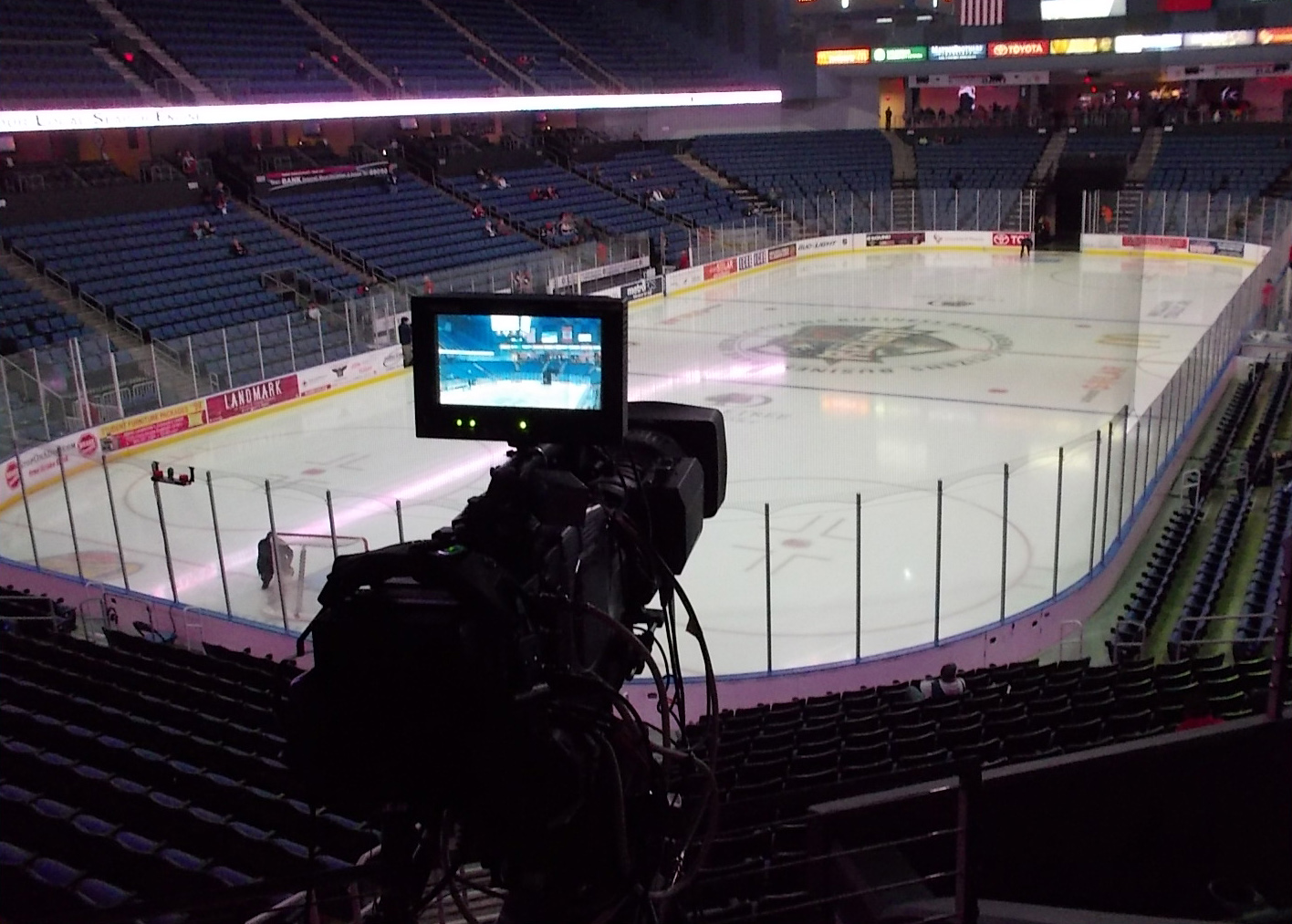
The event was held at the Toyota Arena in Ontario, California.

In October 2019, NJPW announced their expansion into the United States with their new American division, New Japan Pro-Wrestling of America (NJoA). On July 31, 2020, NJPW announced a new weekly series titled NJPW Strong; the series would be produced by NJoA. On January 30, 2023, NJPW announced that all of the promotion's future American events would be branded under the "Strong" name. NJoA PPVs have since aired under the NJPW Strong Live banner; these PPV events will later air as part of the NJPW Strong on Demand series.

On May 5, 2024, NJPW announced that a third Resurgence event will take place on May 11, 2024, at the Toyota Arena in Ontario, California.

=== Storylines ===
The event featured several professional wrestling matches, which involve different wrestlers from pre-existing scripted feuds, plots, and storylines. Wrestlers portrayed heroes, villains, or less distinguishable characters in scripted events that build tension and culminate in a wrestling match or series of matches. Storylines are produced on NJPW's events.

== Results ==
No.	Results	Stipulations	Times
1^{P}	Matt Vandagriff defeated Adrian Quest by pinfall	STRONG Survivor match	4:27
2^{P}	Mustafa Ali defeated Lio Rush by pinfall	Singles match	6:33
3	House of Torture (Jack Perry, Ren Narita, and Evil) defeated Chaos (Tomohiro Ishii and Rocky Romero) and The DKC by pinfall	Six-man tag team match	11:29
4	West Coast Wrecking Crew (Jorel Nelson and Royce Isaacs) defeated Tom Lawlor and Fred Rosser by pinfall	Tag team match	12:27
5	Guerrillas of Destiny (Hikuleo and El Phantasmo) defeated TMDK (Shane Haste and Mikey Nicholls) (c) by pinfall	Tag team match for the Strong Openweight Tag Team Championship	10:17
6	Stephanie Vaquer (c) defeated Alex Windsor by pinfall	Singles match for the Strong Women's Championship	10:52
7	Los Ingobernables de Japon (Yota Tsuji and Tetsuya Naito) defeated Bullet Club (David Finlay and Kenta) by pinfall	Tag team match	14:40
8	Zack Sabre Jr. defeated Hiroshi Tanahashi by pinfall	Singles match	12:11
9	Jeff Cobb (c) defeated Lance Archer by pinfall	Singles match for the NJPW World Television Championship	11:35
10	Shingo Takagi (c) defeated Yuya Uemura by pinfall	Singles match for the NEVER Openweight Championship	21:00
11	Gabe Kidd defeated Eddie Kingston (c)	No Ropes Last Man Standing match for the Strong Openweight Championship	20:20
12	Jon Moxley (c) defeated Shota Umino by pinfall	Singles match for the IWGP World Heavyweight Championship	34:23
(c) / – the champion(s) heading into the match; P / – the match was broadcast on the pre-show
