= NJPW Resurgence (2021) =

2021 New Japan Pro-Wrestling event

Resurgence
- Promotional poster featuring several NJPW wrestlers
- Promotion: New Japan Pro-Wrestling
- Date: August 14, 2021
- City: Los Angeles, California
- Venue: The Torch at LA Coliseum
- Attendance: 2,222

Event chronology
← Previous; Wrestle Grand Slam in Tokyo Dome	Next → Fighting Spirit Unleashed

Resurgence chronology
← Previous; First	Next → 2023

New Japan Pro-Wrestling of America event chronology
← Previous; Fighting Spirit Unleashed	Next → Battle in the Valley

Resurgence was a professional wrestling pay-per-view (PPV) event produced by New Japan Pro-Wrestling (NJPW). It was held on August 14, 2021, at The Torch at LA Coliseum in Los Angeles, California. Wrestlers from U.S. partner promotions All Elite Wrestling (AEW), Impact Wrestling, Major League Wrestling (MLW), the United Wrestling Network's Championship Wrestling from Hollywood (CWFH), and Ring of Honor (ROH) appeared on the card.

In the main event, Hiroshi Tanahashi defeated Lance Archer to win the IWGP United States Heavyweight Championship. In other prominent matches, Jay White defeated David Finlay to retain the NEVER Openweight Championship, The Good Brothers (Doc Gallows and Karl Anderson) defeated Jon Moxley and Yuji Nagata, and Tomohiro Ishii defeated Moose.

Former IWGP World Heavyweight Champion Will Ospreay made an unannounced surprise appearance at the event announcing himself to be medically cleared to complete and yet out of the G1 Climax, calling current IWGP World Heavyweight Champion Shingo Takagi an “interim” champion and revealing a separate identical IWGP World Heavyweight Championship belt. He also announced himself to not be returning to Japan and instead said he would be competing on New Japan Pro-Wrestling of America (NJoA)'s streaming show, NJPW Strong.

== Production ==
Other on-screen personnel
Role:	Name:
English Commentators	Kevin Kelly
English Commentators	Alex Koslov
English Commentators	Matt Morris
Japanese Commentators	Shinpei Nogami
Japanese Commentators	Milano Collection A.T.
Japanese Commentators	Katsuhiko Kanazawa
Japanese Commentators	Kazuyoshi Sakai
Japanese Commentators	Togi Makabe
Japanese Commentators	Miki Motoi
Japanese Commentators	Jushin Thunder Liger
Japanese Commentators	Masahiro Chono
Ring announcers	Makoto Abe
Ring announcers	Kimihiko Ozaki
Ring announcers	Adnan Kureishy
Referees	Kenta Sato
Referees	Marty Asami
Referees	Red Shoes Unno

=== Background ===
In October 2019, NJPW announced their expansion into the United States with their new American division, New Japan Pro-Wrestling of America. In June 2021, NJPW announced Resurgence would take place on August 14 of that year, at The Torch at LA Coliseum in Los Angeles, California, a concert theater located within the Los Angeles Memorial Coliseum. This event will mark the first NJPW has held in the United States with fans in attendance since February 2020, due to restrictions imposed by the COVID-19 pandemic.

=== Storylines ===
Resurgence featured professional wrestling matches that involve different wrestlers from pre-existing scripted feuds and storylines. Wrestlers portrayed villains, heroes, or less distinguishable characters in the scripted events that built tension and culminated in a wrestling match or series of matches.

LA Dojo Young Lion Alex Coughlin had been challenging many competitors from NJPW and other promotions for a number of weeks, including the likes of Rocky Romero and Josh Alexander on New Japan's American based show, NJPW Strong. It was announced that at Resurgence, he would challenge fellow LA Dojo student Karl Fredericks.

Following weeks of attacks on himself and most of the AEW and Impact Wrestling roster, Jon Moxley would challenge The Good Brothers to a tag team match and would claim to have a mystery partner to tag with at the event.

NEVER Openweight Champion Jay White would suffer a quarter final loss against David Finlay in the New Japan Cup in March. After the win, Finlay was granted a future shot at the NEVER Openweight Championship. After White debuted at Impact Wrestling's Slammiversary, there were weeks of assaults between the two on Impact. The match for the title was announced shortly after the events original announcement.

At night 2 of AEW's Fyter Fest, Hiroshi Tanahashi appeared on a vignette challenging the winner of the later IWGP US Heavyweight Championship match to a future championship match. After Lance Archer beat then champion Jon Moxley at the event, a match between Tanahashi and Archer was made at Resurgence.

== Results ==
No.	Results	Stipulations	Times
1^{D}	Barrett Brown, Misterioso and Bateman defeated Jordan Clearwater, The DKC and Kevin Knight (Note: The match was later aired on an episode of NJPW Xtra.)	Six-man tag team match	9:32
2	Karl Fredericks defeated Alex Coughlin	Singles match	10:48
3	TJP, Clark Connors and Ren Narita defeated Fred Rosser, Rocky Romero, and Wheeler Yuta	Six-man tag team match	11:19
4	Lio Rush, Fred Yehi, Yuya Uemura, Adrian Quest and Chris Dickinson defeated Team Filthy (Tom Lawlor, JR Kratos, Danny Limelight, Jorel Nelson and Royce Isaacs)	Ten-man tag team match	12:45
5	Juice Robinson defeated Hikuleo	Singles match	9:00
6	Tomohiro Ishii defeated Moose	Singles match	16:07
7	The Good Brothers (Karl Anderson and Doc Gallows) defeated Jon Moxley and Yuji Nagata	Tag team match	10:33
8	Jay White (c) defeated David Finlay	Singles match for the NEVER Openweight Championship	22:59
9	Hiroshi Tanahashi defeated Lance Archer (c)	Singles match for the IWGP United States Heavyweight Championship	19:26
(c) / – the champion(s) heading into the match; D / – this was a dark match
