= NJPW Resurgence (2023) =

2023 New Japan Pro-Wrestling professional wrestling event

Resurgence
- Promotional poster featuring Mercedes Moné
- Promotion: New Japan Pro-Wrestling
- Brand: NJPW Strong
- Date: May 21, 2023
- City: Long Beach, California
- Venue: Walter Pyramid
- Attendance: 2,903

Event chronology
← Previous; Wrestling Dontaku 2023; Best of the Super Jr. 30	Next → Dominion 6.4 in Osaka-jo Hall

Resurgence chronology
← Previous; 2021	Next → 2024

Resurgence (2023) was a professional wrestling pay-per-view (PPV) event produced by New Japan Pro-Wrestling (NJPW). It took place on May 21, 2023, at the Walter Pyramid in Long Beach, California. It was the second event under the Resurgence name.

Ten matches were contested at the event, including two on the pre-show. In the main event, Willow Nightingale defeated Mercedes Moné to win the inaugural Strong Women's Championship. In other prominent matches, Juice Robinson defeated Fred Rosser in a Street Fight, Kenta defeated Hikuleo to win the Strong Openweight Championship, Blackpool Combat Club (Jon Moxley and Wheeler Yuta) and Shota Umino defeated Chaos (Kazuchika Okada, Rocky Romero and Tomohiro Ishii) in a six-man tag team match, and Will Ospreay defeated Hiroshi Tanahashi. The event also saw appearances from Toni Storm, Eddie Kingston (via a video package) and Kyle Fletcher, who announced the vacation of both the IWGP Tag Team Championships and Strong Openweight Tag Team Championships on behalf of Aussie Open, due to Mark Davis's injury.

== Production ==
=== Background ===
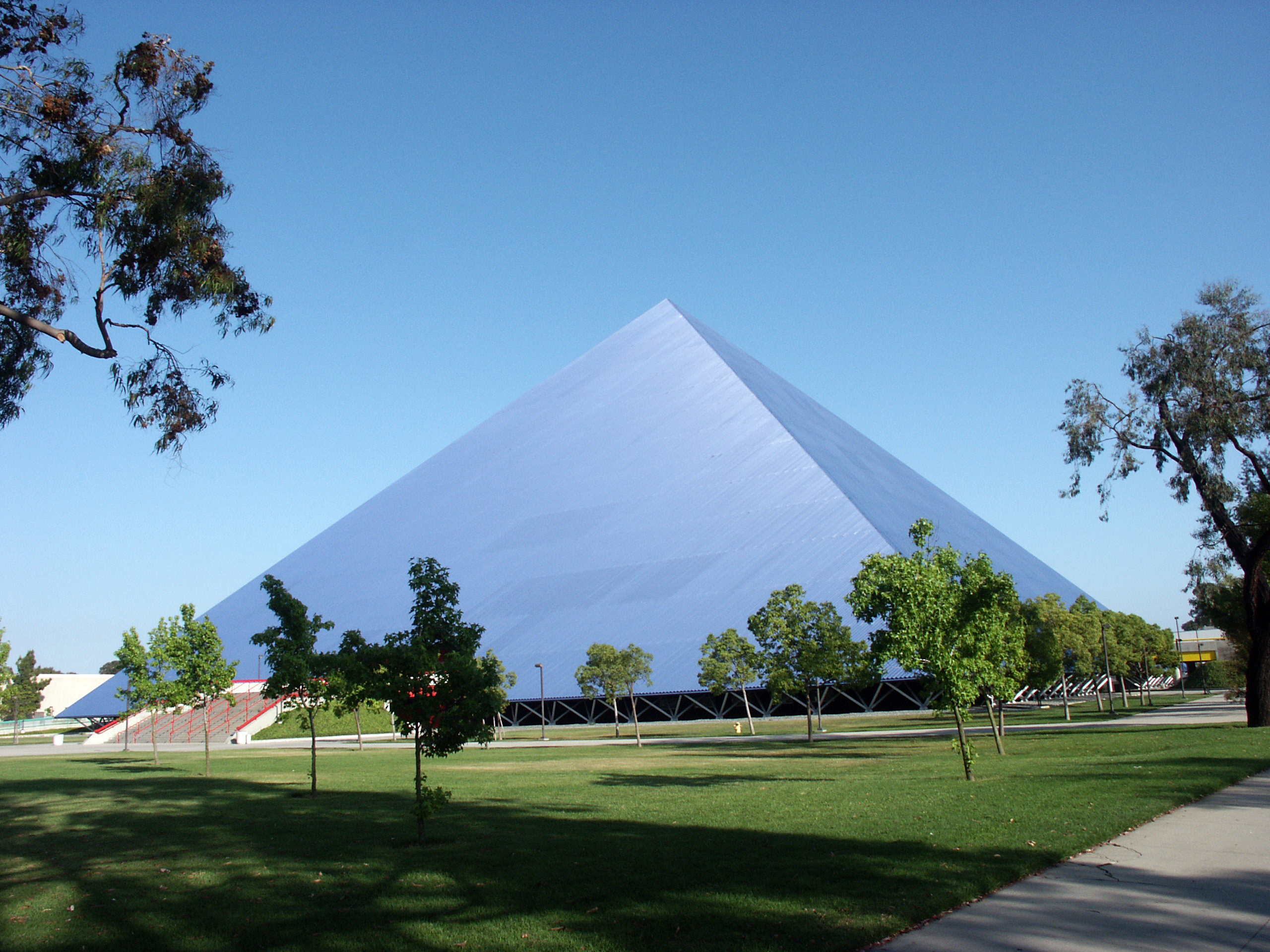
The event was held at the Walter Pyramid in Long Beach, California

In October 2019, NJPW announced their expansion into the United States with their new American division, New Japan Pro-Wrestling of America (NJoA). On July 31, 2020, NJPW announced a new weekly series titled NJPW Strong; the series would be produced by NJoA. On January 30, 2023, NJPW announced that all of the promotion's future American events would be branded under the "Strong" name. Beginning with Battle in the Valley on February 18, the NJoA PPVs began airing as NJPW Strong Live; these PPV events will later air on NJPW World as part of the NJPW Strong on Demand series.

On March 9, 2023, NJPW announced that Resurgence will take place on May 22, 2023, at the Walter Pyramid in Long Beach, California.

=== Storylines ===
The event featured several professional wrestling matches, which involve different wrestlers from pre-existing scripted feuds, plots, and storylines. Wrestlers portrayed heroes, villains, or less distinguishable characters in scripted events that build tension and culminate in a wrestling match or series of matches. Storylines are produced on NJPW's events.

On April 10, NJPW announced a four-man single-elimination tournament to determine the number one contender for Kenny Omega's IWGP United States Championship. At Resurgence, Hiroshi Tanahashi faced Will Ospreay in the semi-finals.

On April 15, at Capital Collision, Fred Rosser was scheduled to face Juice Robinson. As Rosser made his way into the ring, it was revealed that he left a reserved seat at the attendance for Robinson's wife, Toni Storm. Before the match had begun, Robinson attacked Rosser, and continued to do so by using the reserved chair for Storm. This led to Robinson's suspension. On May 4, as the rest of event's card was unveiled, it was revealed that the two would face each other on Resurgence in a Street fight.

On April 27, NJPW announced the creation of the Strong Women's Championship, the inaugural champion of which was crowned at the end of four-woman single-elimination tournament at Resurgence. The tournament will feature representatives from NJPW partner companies All Elite Wrestling (AEW), Consejo Mundial de Lucha Libre (CMLL), and Stardom. The tournament participants are the former IWGP Women's Champion Mercedes Moné (NJPW), Momo Kohgo (Stardom), Stephanie Vaquer (CMLL), and Willow Nightingale (AEW).

On May 1, NJPW announced that the former United States Champion Jon Moxley from AEW would be set to appear at the event, marking his first NJPW appearance since October 2022. On May 4, it was revealed that Moxley would team with Shota Umino and Wheeler Yuta to take on Chaos (Kazuchika Okada, Rocky Romero and Tomohiro Ishii) in a six-man tag team match.

== Results ==
No.	Results	Stipulations	Times
1^{P}	The DKC defeated Bateman by pinfall	Singles match	8:23
2^{P}	Alex Coughlin defeated Christopher Daniels by pinfall	Singles match	9:26
3	Barbaro Cavernario and Virus defeated TMDK (Bad Dude Tito and Zack Sabre Jr.) (with Kosei Fujita) by pinfall	Tag team match	14:05
4	Mercedes Moné defeated Stephanie Vaquer by pinfall	Tournament semifinals match for the inaugural Strong Women's Championship	11:55
5	Willow Nightingale defeated Momo Kohgo by pinfall	Tournament semifinals match for the inaugural Strong Women's Championship	9:37
6	Juice Robinson (with Toni Storm) defeated Fred Rosser by pinfall	Street Fight	23:10
7	Kenta defeated Hikuleo (c) by countout	Singles match for the Strong Openweight Championship	11:57
8	Blackpool Combat Club (Jon Moxley and Wheeler Yuta) and Shota Umino defeated Chaos (Kazuchika Okada, Rocky Romero and Tomohiro Ishii) by pinfall	Six-man tag team match	19:37
9	Will Ospreay defeated Hiroshi Tanahashi by pinfall	Tournament semifinals match to determine the #1 contender for the IWGP United States Heavyweight Championship; Winner will face Lance Archer in the finals at Dominion.	16:44
10	Willow Nightingale defeated Mercedes Moné by pinfall	Tournament final match for the inaugural Strong Women's Championship	9:34
(c) / – the champion(s) heading into the match; P / – the match was broadcast on the pre-show

=== Inaugural Strong Women's Championship tournament ===
Semifinals
Mercedes Moné	Pin
Stephanie Vaquer	11:55
Momo Kohgo	9:37
Willow Nightingale	Pin

Final
Mercedes Moné	9:34
Willow Nightingale	Pin
