= NJPW Resurgence (2025) =

2025 New Japan Pro-Wrestling professional wrestling event

Resurgence
- Promotional poster featuring Mercedes Moné
- Promotion: New Japan Pro-Wrestling
- Brand: NJPW Strong
- Date: May 9, 2025
- City: Ontario, California
- Venue: Toyota Arena
- Attendance: 2,027

Event chronology
← Previous; Wrestling Dontaku	Next → Dominion 6.15 in Osaka-jo Hall

Resurgence chronology
← Previous; 2024	Next → —

Resurgence (2025) was a professional wrestling pay-per-view (PPV) event produced by New Japan Pro-Wrestling (NJPW). It took place on May 9, 2025, at the Toyota Arena in Ontario, California. It was the fourth Resurgence event overall.

== Production ==
=== Background ===
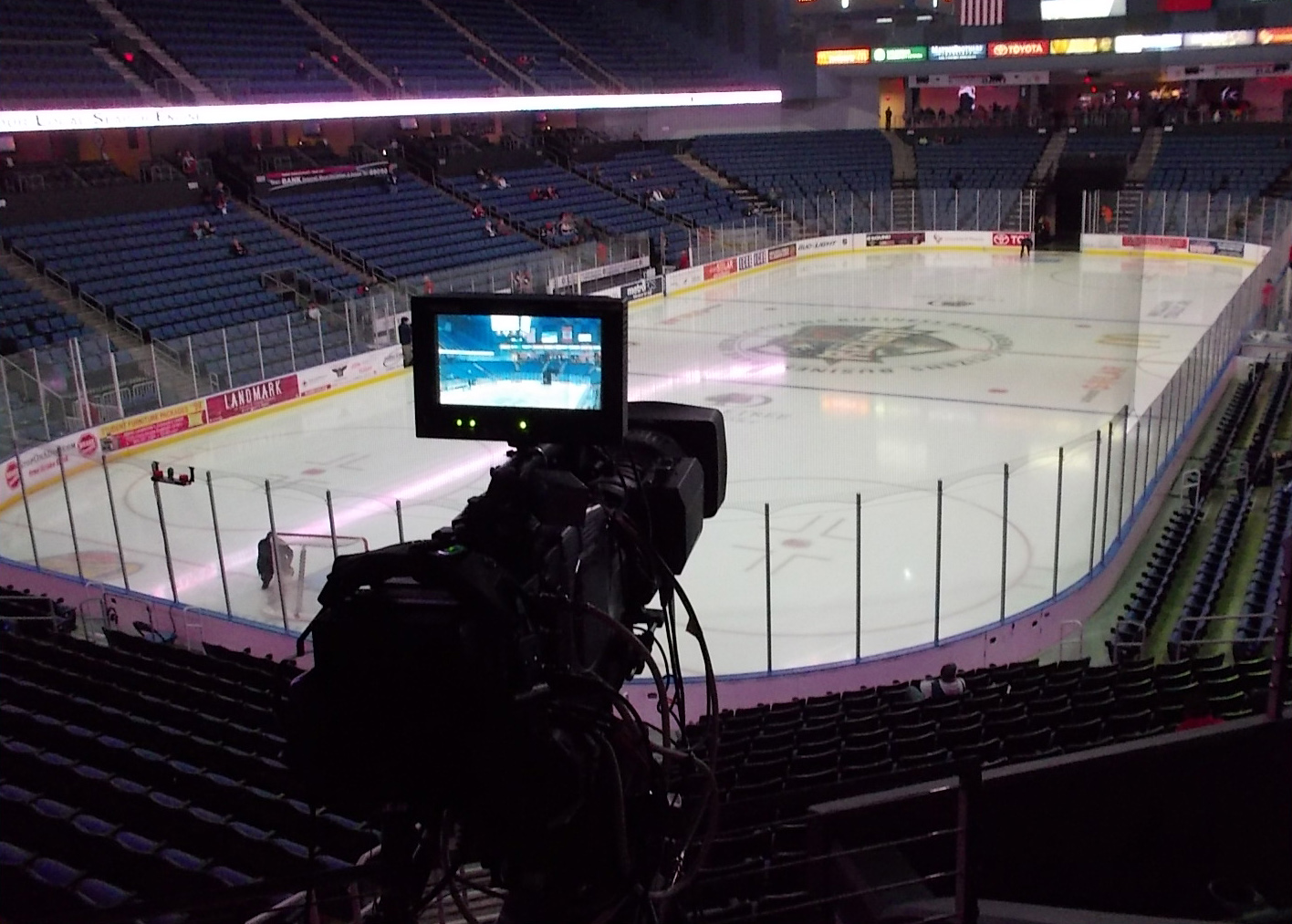
The event was held at the Toyota Arena in Ontario, California for a second consecutive year.

In October 2019, NJPW announced their expansion into the United States with their new American division, New Japan Pro-Wrestling of America (NJoA). On July 31, 2020, NJPW announced a new weekly series titled NJPW Strong; the series would be produced by NJoA. On January 30, 2023, NJPW announced that all of the promotion's future American events would be branded under the "Strong" name. NJoA PPVs have since aired under the NJPW Strong Live banner; these PPV events will later air as part of the NJPW Strong on Demand series.

On January 13, 2025, NJPW announced that a fourth Resurgence event will take place on May 9, 2025, at the Toyota Arena in Ontario, California.

=== Storylines ===
The event featured several professional wrestling matches, which involve different wrestlers from pre-existing scripted feuds, plots, and storylines. Wrestlers portrayed heroes, villains, or less distinguishable characters in scripted events that built tension and culminated in a wrestling match or series of matches. Storylines were produced on NJPW's events.

=== Event ===
The event started with the preshow singles confrontation between Allan Breeze and CJ Tino, solded with the victory of the latter. In the first main card bout, Bea Priestley defeated Viva Van in singles competition. Next up, Fred Rosser picked up a victory over Matt Vandagriff via submission as a result of a singles bout. The fourth match of the event saw TJP and Templario defeat Royce Isaacs and Jorel Nelson to win the Strong Openweight Tag Team Championship, ending the latter teams' reign at 145 days and two defenses. Next up, The Young Bucks, Doc Gallows and Karl Anderson defeated David Finlay, Gabe Kidd, Clark Connors and Gedo in eight-man tag team competition, portraying a confrontation of the time's past and present Bullet Club generations. In the sixth bout, Tomohiro Ishii defeated Drilla Moloney to secure the first successful defense of the Strong Openweight Championship in that respective reign. The seventh bout saw Konosuke Takeshita defeat El Phantasmo to secure the sixth consecutive defense of the NEVER Openweight Championship in that respective reign.

The show featured a double main event. In the first main bout, Hirooki Goto wrestled Zack Sabre Jr. into a double double pinfall, thus securing the sixth consecutive defense of the IWGP World Heavyweight Championship in that respective reign.

In the second main event, AZM defeated reigning champion Mercedes Moné to win the Strong Women's Championship in a three-way match also involving Mina Shirakawa.

== Results ==
No.	Results	Stipulations	Times
1^{P}	CJ Tino defeated Allan Breeze by pinfall	STRONG Survivor match	5:25
2^{P}	Bea Priestley defeated Viva Van by pinfall	Singles match	4:17
3	Fred Rosser defeated Matt Vandagriff by submission	Singles match	13:45
4	United Empire (TJP and Templario) defeated World Class Wrecking Crew (Royce Isaacs and Jorel Nelson) (c) by pinfall	Tag team match for the Strong Openweight Tag Team Championship	13:12
5	The Young Bucks (Matthew Jackson and Nicholas Jackson) and The Good Brothers (Doc Gallows and Karl Anderson) defeated Bullet Club War Dogs (David Finlay, Gabe Kidd, Clark Connors and Gedo) by pinfall	Eight-man tag team match	13:39
6	Tomohiro Ishii (c) defeated Drilla Moloney by pinfall	Singles match for the Strong Openweight Championship	13:39
7	Konosuke Takeshita (c) (with Rocky Romero) defeated El Phantasmo by pinfall	Singles match for the NEVER Openweight Championship	17:48
8	Hirooki Goto (c) vs. Zack Sabre Jr. (with Shane Haste) ended in a double pinfall draw	Singles match for the IWGP World Heavyweight Championship	17:28
9	AZM defeated Mercedes Moné (c) and Mina Shirakawa by pinfall	Three-way match for the Strong Women's Championship	17:53
(c) / – the champion(s) heading into the match; P / – the match was broadcast on the pre-show
