= NJPW Resurgence =

Resurgence
- Promotions: New Japan Pro-Wrestling
- Brand: NJPW Strong (2022–2025)
- First event: Resurgence (2021)

NJPW Resurgence is a professional wrestling event held annually by New Japan Pro-Wrestling (NJPW). Since its inception in 2021, it has been held annually in Southern California.

== History ==
In October 2019, NJPW announced their expansion into the United States with their new American division, New Japan Pro-Wrestling of America (NJoA). On July 31, 2020, NJPW announced a new weekly series titled NJPW Strong; the series would be produced by NJoA. On January 30, 2023, NJPW announced that all of the promotion's future American events would be branded under the "Strong" name. Beginning with Battle in the Valley on February 18, the NJoA PPVs began airing as NJPW Strong Live; these PPV events will later air on NJPW World as part of the NJPW Strong on Demand series. On March 9, 2023, NJPW announced that Resurgence will take place on May 22, 2023, at the Walter Pyramid in Long Beach, California, establishing Resurgence as an annual event. On May 5, 2024, NJPW announced that a third Resurgence event will take place on May 11, 2024, at the Toyota Arena in Ontario, California. On January 13, 2025, NJPW announced that a fourth Resurgence event would take place at the Toyota Arena for a second consecutive year on May 9, 2025.

== Dates and venues ==
#	Event	Date	City	Venue	Main Event	Notes	Ref
1	Resurgence (2021)	August 14, 2021	Los Angeles, California	The Torch at Los Angeles Memorial Coliseum	Lance Archer (c) vs. Hiroshi Tanahashi for the IWGP United States Heavyweight Championship		
2	Resurgence (2023)	May 21, 2023	Long Beach, California	Walter Pyramid	Mercedes Moné vs. Willow Nightingale for the inaugural Strong Women's Championship		
3	Resurgence (2024)	May 11, 2024	Ontario, California	Toyota Arena	Jon Moxley (c) vs. Shota Umino for the IWGP World Heavyweight Championship		
4	Resurgence (2025)	May 9, 2025	Ontario, California	Toyota Arena	Mercedes Moné (c) vs. AZM vs. Mina Shirakawa for the Strong Women's Championship		
