= Hikuleo (wrestler) =

American professional wrestler (born 1991)

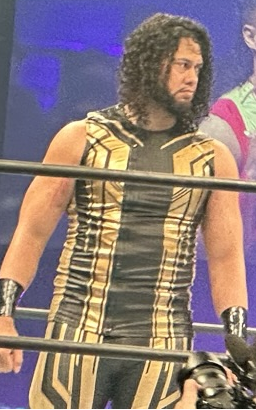
- Hikuleo in 2023

Personal information
- Born: Taula Koloamatangi; February 7, 1991 (age 35) Kissimmee, Florida, U.S.
- Education: Webber International University
- Parent: Haku (adoptive father)
- Relatives: Tama Tonga (brother); Tanga Loa (adoptive brother/cousin); Bad Luck Fale (cousin)

Professional wrestling career
- Ring name(s): Hikuleo; HikuLe'o; Leo Tonga; Tala Tonga; Talla Tonga
- Billed height: 6 ft 8 in (203 cm) – 6 ft 9 in (206 cm)
- Billed weight: 265 lb (120 kg)
- Billed from: Kissimmee, Florida
- Trained by: Bad Luck Fale; Super Strong Machine; Bubba Ray Dudley; D-Von Dudley
- Debut: November 12, 2016

Taula Leone Fifita (né Koloamatangi; born February 7, 1991) is an American professional wrestler. He is signed to WWE, where he performs on the SmackDown brand under the ring name Talla Tonga. He is a member of The MFTs tag-team and one-half of the WWE Tag Team Champions alongside his brother Tama Tonga.

The son of professional wrestler Tonga "Haku" Fifita, he debuted as a wrestler in 2016 in New Japan Pro-Wrestling (NJPW) as Hikuleo. In his time with NJPW, he was a member of Bullet Club and Guerrillas of Destiny (GoD), and was a former Strong Openweight Champion, a two-time Strong Openweight Tag Team Champion, and a one-time IWGP Tag Team Champion (with partner El Phantasmo as part of GoD). He departed from NJPW in 2024 and signed with WWE shortly thereafter.

== Early life ==
Taula Leone Fifita (born Taula Koloamatangi) and his elder brother Alipate were adopted by their maternal aunt, Dorothy Koloamatangi, and her husband, professional wrestler Tonga Fifita, better known as Haku. He was born and raised in Kissimmee, Florida, where he attended Osceola High School. He then attended Webber International University in Babson Park, Florida, majoring in sport management and playing basketball as a center for the Webber International Warriors. He was named Webber International University's junior varsity men's basketball most valuable player for 2009–2010.

== Professional wrestling career ==
=== New Japan Pro-Wrestling (2016–2024) ===
==== Bullet Club (2016–2022) ====
Fifita was trained to wrestle by Bully Ray and Devon at the Team 3D Academy in Florida. In 2016, he travelled to Japan, where he became a student at the New Japan Pro-Wrestling (NJPW) dojo. Fifita, under the ring name Hikule'o (a reference to the Tongan god), made his professional wrestling debut on November 12, 2016, in Auckland, New Zealand at NJPW's On the Mat Internet pay-per-view, losing to Henare.

Fifita continued his training throughout 2017, serving as a young lion. He rejoined the active NJPW roster in September 2017, taking part in the Destruction tour under the ring name "Leo Tonga". He joined the gaijin heel stable Bullet Club alongside his brothers Tanga Loa and Tama Tonga and his cousin Bad Luck Fale, substituting for the injured Kenny Omega. On January 4, 2018, Fifita appeared at Wrestle Kingdom 12, the 27th annual January 4 Tokyo Dome Show (NJPW's annual flagship event), taking part in a New Japan Rumble. At The New Beginning in Sapporo later that month, Fifita changed his ring name to "Hikuleo". In March 2018, Hikuleo sustained an injury to his anterior cruciate ligament.

After recuperating and spending six months training at the NJPW Dojo in Los Angeles, Hikuleo returned at Honor Rising: Japan in February 2019, accompanying his brothers to ringside. Hikuleo competed in the 2019 New Japan Cup for the first time in his career, in which he was eliminated in the first round by Mikey Nicholls. Following that, Hikuleo debuted in The European promotion Revolution Pro Wrestling for his excursion to gain more experience and training, losing to Dan Magee in his first match on June 29. Hikuleo was absent from NJPW for a year from September 2019; he returned in September 2020 on the NJPW's United States show, NJPW Strong, defeating Brody King. In March of the following year, Hikuleo competed in the New Japan Cup USA tournament, defeating Jordan Clearwater to qualify for the tournament. In the first round, Hikuleo defeated Fred Rosser, but lost in the semi-final round to eventual tournament winner Tom Lawlor. In August, Hikuleo was defeated by Juice Robinson at NJPW Resurgence.

==== Guerillas of Destiny (2022–2024) ====
Following The Guerillas of Destiny's ejection from Bullet Club at No Surrender Hikuleo began to become more aggressive to stable leader Jay White, who was responsible for kicking out Hikuleo's brothers. This led to Hikuleo answering White's "U.S of Jay" open challenge at Mutiny in April 2022, however White defeated Hikuleo, who gave White the "too sweet" gesture post-match, confirming his loyalty to Bullet Club. At Windy City Riot, Hikuleo teamed with his Bullet Club stablemates and Scott Norton, losing to United Empire. Hikuleo teamed with White, to defeat Kazuchika Okada and Rocky Romero of Chaos at Capital Collision in May. Hikuleo was scheduled to compete in an 8-man tag-team match at AEW x NJPW: Forbidden Door, teaming with Bullet Club stablemate El Phantasmo and one night only members The Young Bucks against Darby Allin, Sting and Los Ingobernables de Japon members, Hiromu Takahashi and Shingo Takagi, however it was announced that Takahashi wouldn't be able to compete at the event, due to suffering from a fever, so the match was made a six-man tag-team match, without Hikuleo. Despite this, Hikuleo appeared at the event in the corner of Bullet Club. Despite interfering in the match, Bullet Club was defeated by Sting, Allin, and Takagi at the event. In September, Hikuleo made his return to Japan at NJPW Burning Spirit teaming with Kenta and Taiji Ishimori to defeat Togi Makabe, Tomoaki Honma and Kushida. Later in the Burning Spirit tour on September 25, Hikuleo betrayed Bullet Club by attacking Jay White and siding with Tama Tonga, turning face and joining the Guerillas of Destiny stable with his brothers Tama Tonga and Tonga Loa along with Jado. On January 4, 2023, at Wrestle Kingdom 17, Hikuleo competed in the New Japan Rambo match, but failed to last till the final 4.

After the event, Jay White challenged Hikuleo to a "Loser Leaves Japan Match", which took place in February at The New Beginning in Osaka, where Hikuleo defeated White, expelling him from Japan. In May 2023, at Wrestling Dontaku, Hikuleo defeated Kenta to win the Strong Openweight Championship, his first championship in NJPW. He would lose the title back to Kenta 18 days later, at Resurgence. In July, Hikuleo entered his first G1 Climax tournament, where he would compete in the A Block. Hikuleo finished his tournament campaign with 8 points, with a win over Shota Umino in the final match of the block, causing him to be the runner up in his block and thus advancing to the quarter-finals. In the quarterfinal round, Hikuleo lost to eventual tournament winner Tetsuya Naito, eliminating him from the tournament. On October 9 at Destruction in Ryogoku, Hikuleo and Phantasmo defeated Bullet Club War Dogs (Alex Coughlin and Gabe Kidd) to become the new champions and the first wrestler to hold the Strong Openweight and Strong Openweight Tag Team Championships.

From November 25 until December 6, Hikuleo and Phantasmo took part in the 2023 World Tag League, where they won their block with a record of five wins and two losses, advancing to the semifinals of the tournament. On December 8, Hikuleo and Phantasmo defeated Mikey Nicholls and Shane Haste in the semifinals and then were defeated by Hirooki Goto and Yoshi-Hashi, on December 10 in the finals of the World Tag League. Following the match, Bishamon challenged Hikuleo and Phantasmo to a match, for both IWGP and the Strong Openweight Tag Team Championships in a Winner Takes All" match. On January 4, 2024, at Wrestle Kingdom 18, Hikuleo and Phantasmo defeated Bishamon in a Winner takes all match to win the IWGP Tag Team Championship, where their Strong Openweight Tag Team Championship was also on the line. On February 11 at The New Beginning in Osaka, Hikuleo and Phantasmo lost the IWGP Tag Team Championship to Bullet Club (Chase Owens and Kenta), ending their reign at 38 days. On April 12 at Windy City Riot, Hikuleo and Phantasmo lost the Strong Openweight Tag Team Championship to TMDK (Mikey Nicholls and Shane Haste) in a four corners match, before regaining them on May 11 at Resurgence.

Hikuleo wrestled his final match for NJPW on June 9, 2024 with El Phantasmo at Dominion 6.9 in Osaka-jo Hall, losing a match for the IWGP Tag Team Championship and Strong Openweight Tag Team Championship.

=== All Elite Wrestling (2021–2022) ===
Hikuleo appeared in the crowd on Night 2 of Fyter Fest in July 2021, watching the IWGP United States Championship match between Jon Moxley and Lance Archer, thus making his All Elite Wrestling (AEW) debut. After Archer's victory, Hikuleo entered the ring to have a stare-down with the victor, hinting at a future match between the two. The match was scheduled for the following week at Fight for the Fallen, where Hikuleo, who was accompanied to the ring by his father King Haku, lost to Archer. Hikuleo appeared on the August 11, 2021 episode of AEW Dark, defeating Thad Brown.

Hikuleo returned to AEW on the June 1, 2022 episode of AEW Dynamite teaming with Undisputed Elite members The Young Bucks and reDRagon to defeat Jurassic Express, Christian Cage, Matt Hardy and Darby Allin in a ten-man tag-team match.

=== Impact Wrestling (2021–2022) ===
In summer 2021, Hikuleo began making appearances in another NJPW partner promotion in the United States, Impact Wrestling. By autumn 2021, he was listed as a member of the Impact roster, and he, Chris Bey, and El Phantasmo established themselves as a U.S. based branch of Bullet Club in Impact Wrestling. Hikuleo teamed with Bey in his Impact debut, defeating FinJuice at Victory Road. On the October 21st episode of Impact!, Hikuleo and Bey faced off in a #1 contendership match for the Impact World Tag Team Championship, but the match ended in a no contest. Therefore, at Bound for Glory, a three-way tag-team match was set up between the two teams and Tag Team Champions, The Good Brothers with the titles on the line. At the event, The Good Brothers retained the championships. At Turning Point in November, Bey and Hikuleo were once again unsuccessful in capturing the Impact World Tag Team Championships from The Good Brothers. Hikuleo returned to Impact Wrestling in November 2022 at Emergence, teaming with Bullet Club stablemates to lose to Honor No More in a 12-man tag team match.

=== WWE (2024–present) ===
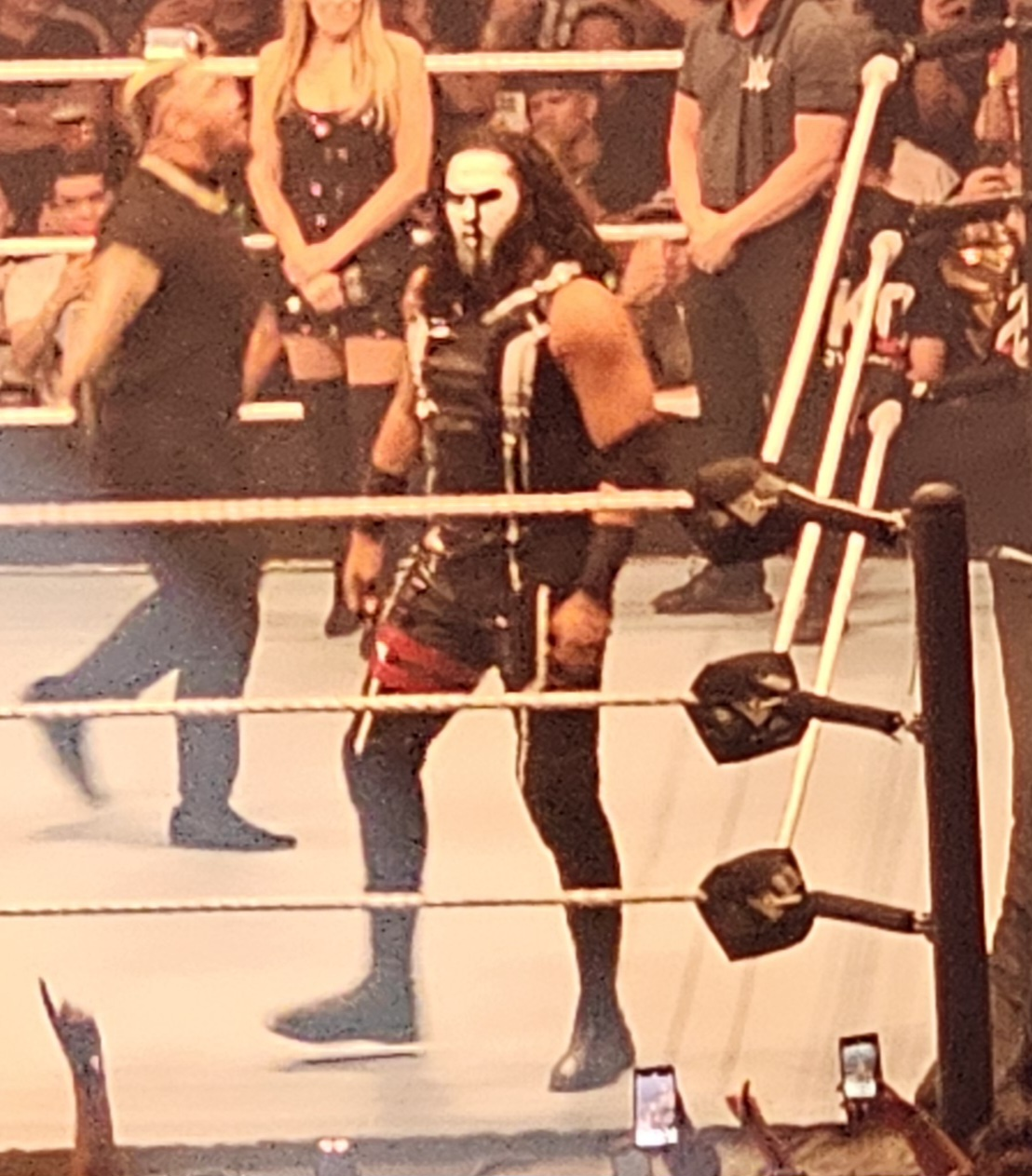
Tonga in 2026

In July 2024, Fifita signed with WWE and began training at the Performance Center. Almost a year after, he had his first match before the June 13, 2025 episode of SmackDown, defeating Kit Wilson in a dark match. He debuted at Night of Champions as Tala Tonga, assisting Solo Sikoa in defeating Jacob Fatu for the WWE United States Championship, establishing himself as a heel and joining The Bloodline. On the July 4 episode of SmackDown, his ring name was slightly changed to Talla Tonga, while the Bloodline was rebranded to the MFT. He then made his formal televised in-ring debut on the August 1 episode of SmackDown, the night before SummerSlam, emerging victorious against Jimmy Uso. On the June 26, 2026 episode of SmackDown, the MFT disbanded when Talla and Tama Tonga separated from Sikoa. On the July 17 episode of SmackDown, Talla suffered his first pinfall loss in WWE against Finn Bálor. On the July 31 episode of SmackDown, The Tongans returned, managed by their father, Haku, and reclaimed the MFT name. On the August 14 episode of SmackDown, The MFTs won the WWE Tag Team Championship after defeating The War Raiders (Erik and Ivar) and Damian Priest and R-Truth in a triple threat tag team match, marking Talla's first championship win in WWE.

== Personal life ==
A second generation professional wrestler, Fifita is the nephew and adopted son of professional wrestler Tonga Fifita (known as Haku and Meng) and his wife Dorothy Koloamatangi. He has a half-brother, Alipate Leone who is also a professional wrestler best known as name Tama Tonga, and is the cousin and adopted brother of fellow professional wrestler Tevita (who is best known under the name Tanga Loa), and Vika Fifita. He is also the cousin by adoption of Simi Taitoko ("Toks") Fale, who is also a professional wrestler best known under the name Bad Luck Fale.

== Championships and accomplishments ==
- New Japan Pro-Wrestling
  - Strong Openweight Championship (1 time)
  - Strong Openweight Tag Team Championship (2 times) – with El Phantasmo
  - IWGP Tag Team Championship (1 time) – with El Phantasmo
- Pro Wrestling Illustrated
  - Ranked No. 268 of the top 500 singles wrestlers in the PWI 500 of 2026
- WWE
  - WWE Tag Team Championship (1 time, current) – with Tama Tonga
