= Strong Openweight Championship =

Japanese pro wrestling championship

- The Strong Openweight Championship belt

Details
- Promotion: New Japan Pro-Wrestling
- Brand: Strong
- Date established: April 2, 2021
- Current champion: Boltin Oleg
- Date won: February 27, 2026

Other names
- Strong Openweight Championship (2021–present); NJPW Strong Openweight Championship
Statistics
- First champion: Tom Lawlor
- Most reigns: Kenta (2 reigns)
- Longest reign: Tom Lawlor (387 days)
- Shortest reign: Hikuleo (18 days)
- Oldest champion: Tomohiro Ishii (49 years, 4 months and 1 day)
- Youngest champion: Gabe Kidd (27 years and 17 days)
- Heaviest champion: Hikuleo (264 lb (120 kg))
- Lightest champion: Kenta (187 lb (85 kg))

The Strong Openweight Championship (STRONG無差別級王座, STRONG musabetsu-kyū ōza) is a professional wrestling world championship owned and promoted by the Japanese promotion New Japan Pro-Wrestling (NJPW). It is exclusively featured on NJPW's Strong brand and is defended at NJPW Strong branded shows in America. The current champion is Boltin Oleg, who is in his first reign. He won the title by defeating Tomohiro Ishii at The New Beginning USA in Trenton, New Jersey, on February 27, 2026.

The title was officially announced on April 2, 2021, and the inaugural champion was Tom Lawlor. It was primarily featured on NJPW's American television program NJPW Strong, which includes American wrestlers, as well as on programming by NJPW partner American promotions All Elite Wrestling (AEW) and Ring of Honor (ROH). When the title is jointly held with the AEW Continental Championship and ROH World Championship, the three titles together make up the American Triple Crown Championship, also referred to as the Continental Crown; as of March 2024, this has only happened once.

== History ==
The title was officially announced on April 2, 2021. Initially, the title was exclusively featured on NJPW's American television program NJPW Strong, which includes a distinct roster of American wrestlers.

On November 11, 2023, NJPW's American partner promotion AEW announced a tournament called the Continental Classic, with the winner becoming the first AEW Continental Champion. Eddie Kingston, who held the ROH World Championship and the Strong Openweight Championship, announced that he would be putting his championships on the line in the tournament and that the tournament's winner would be an American Triple Crown Champion (collectively referred to as the Continental Crown). At AEW's Worlds End event, Kingston defeated Jon Moxley in the Continental Classic final, retaining the Strong Openweight and ROH World championships and becoming the first Continental Crown Champion. Kingston would lose the AEW Continental Championship to Kazuchika Okada on the March 20, 2024, episode of AEW Dynamite, thus losing his recognition as Triple Crown Champion.

=== Inaugural tournament ===
Qualifying; March 5, 12, 19, 26
Clark Connors	Pin
TJP	9:27
Rocky Romero	13:57
Lio Rush	Pin
Brody King	Pin
Bateman	13:25
Blake Christian	8:53
Chris Dickinson	Pin
Ren Narita	Pin
Misterioso	11:12
The DKC	9:13
Tom Lawlor	Pin
Jordan Clearwater	7:57
Hikuleo	Pin
Fred Rosser	Pin
J. R. Kratos	14:16

Round 1 April 9
Clark Connors	9:57
Lio Rush	Pin
Brody King	Pin
Chris Dickinson	10:42
Ren Narita	13:19
Tom Lawlor	Sub
Hikuleo	Pin
Fred Rosser	6:22

Semi-finals; April 16
Lio Rush	7:38
Brody King	Pin
Tom Lawlor	Pin
Hikuleo	8:58

Final; April 23
Brody King	20:05
Tom Lawlor	Sub

== Reigns ==
Current champion Boltin Oleg

As of October 18, 2026, there have been nine reigns between eight champions. Tom Lawlor was the inaugural champion. Tomohiro Ishii is the oldest, when he won it at 49 years old, while Gabe Kidd is the youngest champion at 27 years old. Lawlor's reign is the longest at 387 days while Hikuleo's reign is the shortest at 18 days.

The current champion is Boltin Oleg, who is in his first reign. He won the title by defeating Tomohiro Ishii at The New Beginning USA in Trenton, New Jersey, on February 27, 2026.

Key
No.	Overall reign number
Reign	Reign number for the specific champion
Days	Number of days held
Days recog.	Number of days held recognized by the promotion
Defenses	Number of successful defenses
N/A	Unknown information
+	Current reign is changing daily

No.	Champion	Championship change			Reign statistics				Notes	Ref.
No.	Champion	Date	Event	Location	Reign	Days	Days recog.	Defenses	Notes	Ref.
New Japan Pro Wrestling (NJPW)
1	Tom Lawlor	April 23, 2021 (air date)	New Japan Cup USA 2021	Port Hueneme, CA	1	N/A	387	9	Defeated Brody King in the finals of an 16-man single-elimination tournament to become the inaugural champion. The exact date this event was taped is unknown. It aired on April 23, 2021 on tape delay.	
2	Fred Rosser	May 15, 2022	Strong: Collision in Philadelphia	Philadelphia, PA	1	279	238	7	Aired on tape delay on June 25, 2022.	
3	Kenta	February 18, 2023	Battle in the Valley	San Jose, CA	1	74	74	2		
4	Hikuleo	May 3, 2023	Wrestling Dontaku	Fukuoka, Japan	1	18	18	0		
5	Kenta	May 21, 2023	Resurgence	Long Beach, CA	2	45	45	0	This title change was via countout	
6	Eddie Kingston	July 5, 2023	Independence Day; Night 2	Tokyo, Japan	1	311	311	12	During this reign, the championship became part of the American Triple Crown Championship (also referred to as the Continental Crown), with Kingston defending the championship alongside the AEW Continental Championship and ROH World Championship after winning the Continental Classic tournament at Worlds End. Kingston would lose the AEW Continental Championship to Kazuchika Okada on the March 20, 2024 episode of AEW Dynamite, thus dissolving the Triple Crown.	
7	Gabe Kidd	May 11, 2024	Resurgence	Ontario, CA	1	335	335	6	This was a No Ropes Last Man Standing match.	
8	Tomohiro Ishii	April 11, 2025	Windy City Riot	Chicago, IL	1	322	322	1	This was a 30-minute iron man match, which Ishii won 2–1 in sudden death overtime.	
9	Boltin Oleg	February 27, 2026	The New Beginning USA	Trenton, NJ	1	233+	233+	0		

== Combined reigns ==
As of October 18, 2026.

†	Indicates the current champion

Rank	Wrestler	No. of reigns	Combined defenses	Combined days	Combined days rec. by NJPW
1	Tom Lawlor	1	9	N/A	387
2	Gabe Kidd	1	6	335	
3	Tomohiro Ishii	1	1	322	
4	Eddie Kingston	1	12	311	
5	Fred Rosser	1	7	279	238
6	Boltin Oleg †	1	0	233+	
7	Kenta	2	2	119	
8	Hikuleo	1	0	18	

== See also ==
- Professional wrestling in the United States
