= Alex Coughlin =

American professional wrestler

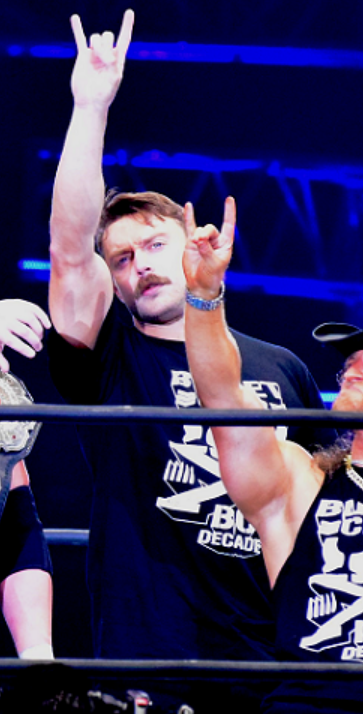
- Coughlin in June 2023

Personal information
- Born: Alex Coughlin; December 3, 1993 (age 32) Long Island, New York, U.S.

Professional wrestling career
- Ring name(s): Alex Coughlin; Leo Blackstone
- Billed height: 6 ft 0 in (1.83 m)
- Billed weight: 205 lb (93 kg)
- Trained by: Bull James; Katsuyori Shibata; NJPW L.A. Dojo
- Debut: April 28, 2018
- Retired: March 23, 2024

Alex Coughlin (born December 3, 1993) is an American former professional wrestler. He is best known for his time in New Japan Pro-Wrestling (NJPW), where he was a member of Bullet Club and a former Strong Openweight Tag Team Champion, alongside Bullet Club stablemate Gabe Kidd. He has also made appearances for Ring Of Honor (ROH), Game Changer Wrestling (GCW), Revolution Pro Wrestling (RPW) and Impact Wrestling

== Professional wrestling career ==
=== Early career (2018) ===
Coughlin made his debut on April 28, 2018, working mainly for his hometown promotion New York Wrestling Connection, where he was trained by Bull James.

=== New Japan Pro-Wrestling (2018–2024) ===
==== Young Lion (2018–2020) ====
In 2018, Coughlin entered the New Japan Pro-Wrestling LA Dojo, as the first class along with Karl Fredericks and Clark Connors, training under Katsuyori Shibata. Coughlin made his in-ring debut, where he was defeated by Connors in a dark match at Fighting Spirit Unleashed. Coughlin visited Japan for the first time as a representative of the LA Dojo at the Young Lion Cup held in September 2019 and came third in the tournament along with Connors with 8 points. Over the next year, Coughlin would lose to many New Japan wrestlers and draw to his fellow young lions, which is common for young lions during their training. Whilst Fredericks and Connors achieved more success, Coughlin continued to train and lose to New Japan wrestlers, due to having less wrestling background prior to joining the Dojo. Through New Japan's partnership with other promotions, Coughlin was also able to make many appearances for Ring of Honor and Revolution Pro Wrestling. Coughlin was regularly featured on Game Changer Wrestling's Bloodsport. On January 4, 2020, at Wrestle Kingdom 14, Coughlin, Fredericks, Connors and Toa Henare defeated Tencozy (Satoshi Kojima and Hiroyoshi Tenzan), Yota Tsuji and Yuya Uemura in an eight-man tag-team match.

==== The Android (2021–2023) ====
In March 2020, New Japan suspended all of its activities, due to the COVID-19 pandemic, causing American-based talent, such as Coughlin to not be able to travel to Japan. Therefore, Coughlin appeared primarily on New Japan's new American-based show NJPW Strong, where he would mainly team up with his LA Dojo teammates. Whilst, Fredericks and Connors had already graduated from being Young Lions due to winning the Young Lion Cup and the Lion's Break Crown respectively, Coughlin would start a ten-match challenge series, facing a range of competitors each week. He would lose the first 8 matches, losing to the likes of Josh Alexander, Tomohiro Ishii and even Fredericks. However, in the ninth match, he defeated J. R. Kratos, after the match Coughlin announced he had graduated as a Young Lion.

In February, Coughlin returned to the UK, continuing to make appearances for Revolution Pro Wrestling. During this time, Coughlin began using the nickname, "The Android", a comparison to his machine-like strength. Also in March, the LA Dojo, which was still represented by graduates like Coughlin, Connors, and Fredericks, began a feud with All Elite Wrestling's The Factory as they fought over which was the superior wrestling developmental system. This led to Coughlin and other LA Dojo members making their debuts on the May 10 edition of AEW Dark, saving the LA Dojo’s The DKC and Kevin Knight from a post-match attack by The Factory. The following week, LA Dojo members defeated The Factory in a ten-man tag team match. On June 26, Coughlin teamed with Yuya Uemura, The DKC, and Kevin Knight on the Buy-in of AEW x NJPW: Forbidden Door in a losing effort to Max Caster and The Gunn Club's Billy Gunn, Austin Gunn and Colten Gunn. Shortly after, it was announced that Coughlin had suffered a leg injury.

Coughlin returned in November on the pre-show of Historic X-Over, teaming with LA Dojo stablemates, Clark Connors, Kevin Knight and Gabriel Kidd to defeat Kosei Fujita, Oskar Leube, Ryohei Oiwa and Yuto Nakashima. A few days later, Coughlin and Kidd teamed together in the World Tag League, however finished bottom of their block with just 2 points.

In February, Coughlin defeated J. R. Kratos on the kickoff show of Battle in the Valley. The following month at Multiverse United, Coughlin teamed with Sami Callihan, Fred Rosser and PCO to defeat Eddie Edwards, Joe Hendry, Tom Lawlor and J. R. Kratos. At NJPW Collision in Philadelphia, Coughlin defeated Tracy Williams. On the buy-in of Resurgence, Coughlin defeated Christopher Daniels.

==== Bullet Club War Dogs (2023–2024) ====
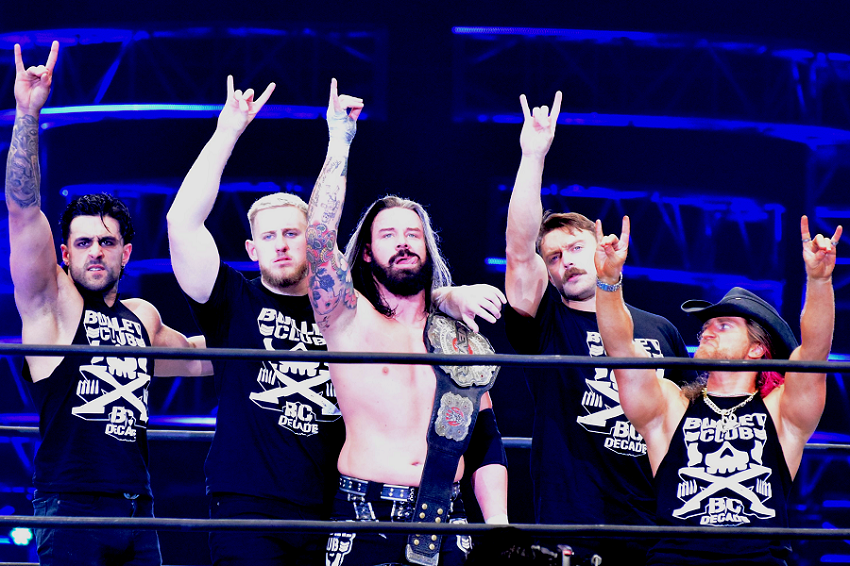
Coughlin (second from the right) with other members of the War Dogs sub-group in June 2023

On June 4 at Dominion, Coughlin and Gabriel Kidd, branded as Bullet Club War Dogs attacked Bishamon (Hirooki Goto and Yoshi-Hashi), following their victory of capturing both the IWGP Tag Team Championship and the Strong Openweight Tag Team Championships, signalling their challenge for both titles, whilst also turning both men heel. The duo later accompanied Bullet Club leader, David Finlay to the ring in Bullet Club shirts, officially joining the stable On July 4 on night 1 of NJPW Independence Day, Coughlin and Kidd defeated Bishamon to win the Strong Openweight Tag Team Championships, marking both men’s first NJPW championships. The following Day on Night 2, the duo lost to Bishamon, in a losing effort to capture the IWGP World Tag Team Championships. Later in the month, Coughlin entered his first G1 Climax tournament, where he would compete in the D Block. Coughlin finished the tournament with a total of 6 points, failing to advance to the quarterfinals. On October 9 at Destruction in Ryōgoku, Coughlin and Kidd lost the Strong Openweight Tag Team Titles to Guerrillas of Destiny (El Phantasmo and Hikuleo), ending their reign at 97 days.

The duo attempted to rebound the following month, entering the annual World Tag League, competing in the A-Block. Coughlin and Kidd finished joint top of their block, with 10 points, advancing to the semi-final round. In the semi-final round, the duo were defeated by Bishamon, eliminating them from the tournament.

On February 11, 2024 at The New Beginning in Osaka, Coughlin teamed with the rest of his Bullet Club War Dogs teammates, to defeat United Empire in a ten-man steel cage match. This would be Coughlin's last wrestling match for NJPW as on March 23, he announced his unexpected retirement from professional wrestling due to a neck injury.

=== Ring of Honor (2019, 2023) ===
Coughlin and other LA Dojo students appeared a few times for Ring of Honor in 2019. most notably on the ROH/NJPW War of the Worlds shows.

Coughlin returned to ROH in April 2023, teaming with his LA Dojo trainer Katsuyori Shibata, to defeat The Workhorsemen (Anthony Henry and JD Drake). After the match, Coughlin pointed at Shibata's ROH Pure Championship, teasing a future match between the two for the title. The match took place on June 1, where Coughlin was defeated by Shibata.

== Professional wrestling style ==
Coughlin's style was based on pure strength, which earned him the nickname of "The Android". He commonly utilized suplexes and was known to deadlift opponents, even if they were larger than him.

== Championships and accomplishments ==
- New Japan Pro-Wrestling
  - Strong Openweight Tag Team Championship (1 time) – with Gabe Kidd
- Pro Wrestling Illustrated
  - Ranked No. 244 of the top 500 singles wrestlers in the PWI 500 in 2023
