= NJPW Independence Day =

2023 New Japan Pro-Wrestling professional wrestling event

- Official logo of the event
- Promotion: New Japan Pro-Wrestling
- Brand: NJPW Strong
- Date: July 4–5, 2023
- City: Tokyo, Japan
- Venue: Korakuen Hall
- Attendance: Night 1: 1,433; Night 2: 1,401; Combined: 2,834

Event chronology
← Previous; Fantastica Mania Mexico	Next → G1 Climax 33

The NJPW Independence Day was a two-night professional wrestling pay-per-view (PPV) event produced by New Japan Pro-Wrestling (NJPW). It took place on July 4 and 5, 2023, at the Korakuen Hall in Tokyo, Japan. It was the first NJPW Strong-branded event to be held in Japan.

== Production ==
=== Storylines ===
The event features professional wrestling matches, which involve different wrestlers from pre-existing scripted feuds, plots, and storylines. Wrestlers portrayed heroes, villains, or less distinguishable characters in scripted events that build tension and culminate in a wrestling match or series of matches. Storylines are produced on NJPW's events.

== Night 1 ==
=== Event ===
The first night of the event from July 4 started with the preshow bout in which Oskar Leube, Yoh and Ryusuke Taguchi defeated Takahiro Katori, Dragon Libre and Kengo in six-man tag team action. The match was broadcast live on NJPW's YouTube channel.

In the first main card match, Bad Dude Tito defeated The DKC in singles competition.

Next up, Jorel Nelson, Royce Isaacs and J. R. Kratos outmatched the team of Ryohei Oiwa, Alex Zayne and Lance Archer.

In the fourth bout, Tom Lawlor defeated Kosei Fujita.

In the fifth bout, Rocky Romero and Eddie Kingston picked up a win over Gedo and the Strong Openweight Champion Kenta.

Next up, World Wonder Ring Stardom's Stars unit member Momo Kohgo and Strong Women's Champion Willow Nightingale picked up a win over Mafia Bella (Giulia and Thekla) in an anticipation of Giulia and Nightingale's match for the Strong title from one night later.

Next up, Alex Coughlin and Gabriel Kidd defeated Hirooki Goto and Yoshi-Hashi to win the Strong Openweight Tag Team Championship, halting the latter team's reign at thirty days and no defenses.

In the semi main event, Drilla Moloney and Clark Connors defeated TJP and Francesco Akira to win the IWGP Junior Heavyweight Tag Team Championship, halting the latter team's reign at thirty days and no defenses.

In the main event, Jun Kasai and El Desperado defeated Homicide and Jon Moxley in a No disqualification doomsday match.

Night 1 (July 4)
No.	Results	Stipulations	Times
1^{P}	Oskar Leube, Yoh and Ryusuke Taguchi defeated Takahiro Katori, Dragon Libre and Kengo	Six-man tag team match	10:45
2	Bad Dude Tito defeated The DKC	Singles match	7:29
3	West Coast Wrecking Crew (Jorel Nelson, Royce Isaacs and J. R. Kratos) defeated Ryohei Oiwa, Alex Zayne and Lance Archer	Six-man tag team match	10:26
4	Tom Lawlor defeated Kosei Fujita	Singles match	8:59
5	Rocky Romero and Eddie Kingston defeated Bullet Club (Gedo and Kenta)	Tag team match	9:29
6	Momo Kohgo and Willow Nightingale defeated Mafia Bella (Giulia and Thekla)	Tag team match	9:54
7	Bullet Club War Dogs (Alex Coughlin and Gabriel Kidd) defeated Bishamon (Hirooki Goto and Yoshi-Hashi) (c)	Tag team match for the Strong Openweight Tag Team Championship	12:18
8	Bullet Club War Dogs (Drilla Moloney and Clark Connors) defeated Catch 2/2 (TJP and Francesco Akira) (c)	Tag team match for the IWGP Junior Heavyweight Tag Team Championship	15:36
9	Jun Kasai and El Desperado defeated Homicide and Jon Moxley	No Disqualification doomsday match	18:34
(c) / – the champion(s) heading into the match; P / – the match was broadcast on the pre-show

== Night 2 ==
=== Event ===
The second night of the event also started with a preshow match broadcast live on YouTube in which Ryusuke Taguchi, Master Wato and Boltin Oleg defeated Dragon Libre, Takahiro Katori and Rekka in six-man tag team action.

The first main card bout saw Satoshi Kojima defeating Oskar Leube in singles competition.

Next up, TJP and Francesco Akira picked up a victory over Ryohei Oiwa and Homicide.

In the fourth match, Drilla Moloney and Clark Connors defeated Rocky Romero and Yoh to retain the IWGP Junior Heavyweight Tag Team Championship short to twenty-four hours after they won the titles the previous night of the event.

Next up, Alex Zayne and Lance Archer defeated Bad Dude Tito and Kosei Fujita.

In the sixth bout, Tomohiro Ishii, Hiroshi Tanahashi and The DKC outmatched the team of Tom Lawlor, Jorel Nelson and Royce Isaacs.

The seventh bout saw Donna Del Mondo stable leader Giulia dethroning Strong Women's Champion Willow Nightingale, ending the latter's reign at forty-five days and two successful defences.

Next up, Hirooki Goto and Yoshi-Hashi defeated Alex Coughlin and Gabriel Kidd to retain the IWGP Tag Team Championship for the first time in that respective reign.

In the ninth bout, Eddie Kingston defeated Kenta to win the Strong Openweight Championship.

In the main event, Jon Moxley defeated El Desperado in a Final Death match.

Night 2 (July 5)
No.	Results	Stipulations	Times
1^{P}	Ryusuke Taguchi, Master Wato and Boltin Oleg defeated Dragon Libre, Takahiro Katori and Rekka	Six-man tag team match	11:37
2	Satoshi Kojima defeated Oskar Leube	Singles match	5:23
3	Catch 2/2 (TJP and Francesco Akira) defeated Ryohei Oiwa and Homicide	Tag team match	12:09
4	Bullet Club War Dogs (Drilla Moloney and Clark Connors) (c) defeated Chaos (Rocky Romero and Yoh)	Tag team match for the IWGP Junior Heavyweight Tag Team Championship	12:05
5	Murder Sauce Monsters (Alex Zayne and Lance Archer) defeated TMDK (Bad Dude Tito and Kosei Fujita)	Tag team match	9:31
6	Tomohiro Ishii, Hiroshi Tanahashi and The DKC defeated Team Filthy (Tom Lawlor, Jorel Nelson and Royce Isaacs)	Six-man tag team match	13:10
7	Giulia defeated Willow Nightingale (c)	Singles match for the Strong Women's Championship	13:29
8	Bishamon (Hirooki Goto and Yoshi-Hashi) (c) defeated Bullet Club War Dogs (Alex Coughlin and Gabriel Kidd)	Tag team match for the IWGP Tag Team Championship	11:29
9	Eddie Kingston defeated Kenta (c)	Singles match for the Strong Openweight Championship	13:30
10	Jon Moxley defeated El Desperado	Final Death match	20:33
(c) / – the champion(s) heading into the match; P / – the match was broadcast on the pre-show
