= The DKC =

American professional wrestler

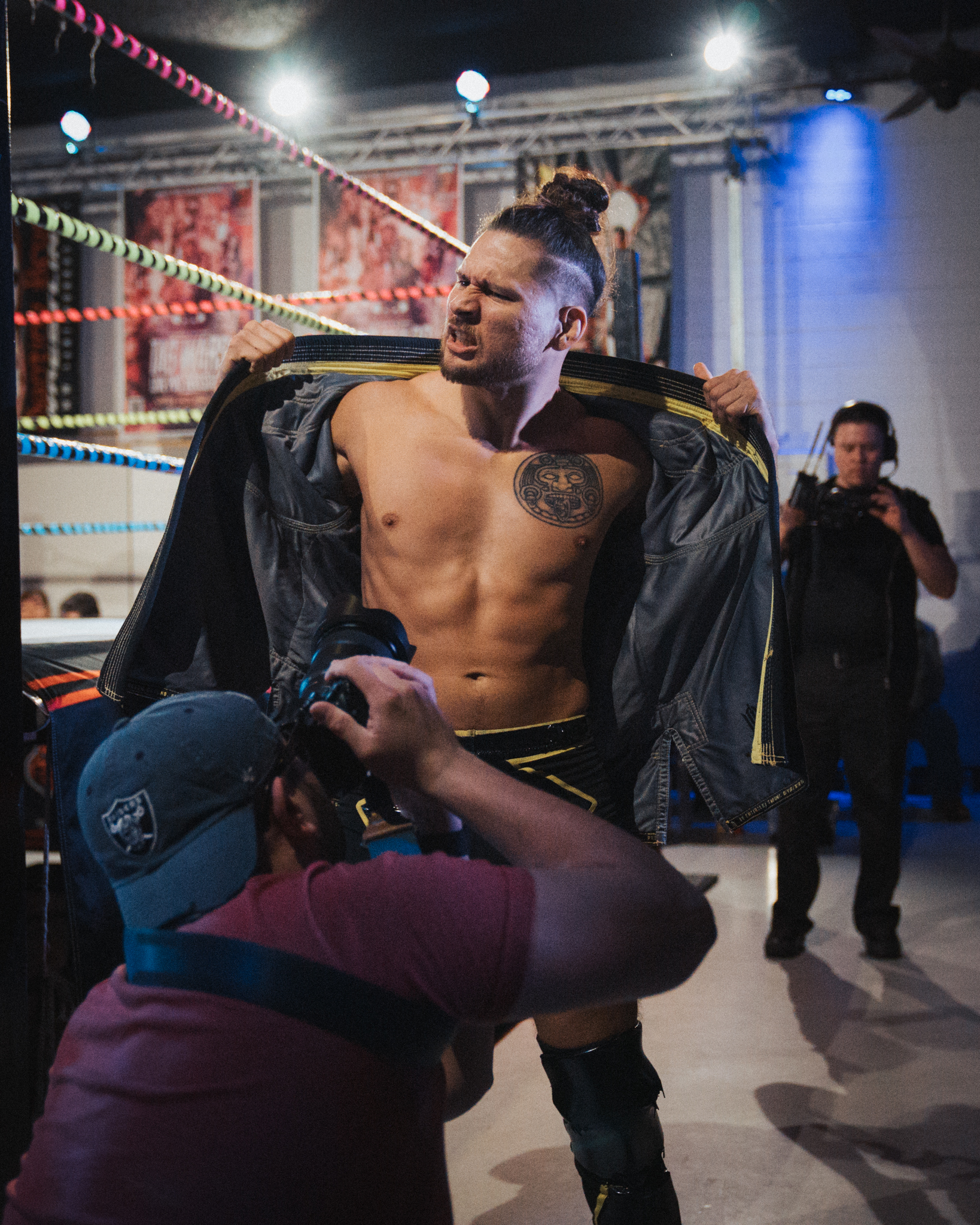
- DKC in January 2024

Personal information
- Born: Dylan Barrales; 27 May 1991 (age 35) Los Angeles, California, United States

Professional wrestling career
- Ring names: Dylan Kyle Cox; The DKC; DKC
- Billed height: 172 cm (5 ft 8 in)
- Billed weight: 70 kg (154 lb)
- Trained by: Phoenix Star; Zokre; Joey Kaos; Robby Phoenix
- Debut: 2018

Dylan Barrales, better known by his ring name DKC (shortened from Dylan Kyle Cox) is an American professional wrestler. He is signed to New Japan Pro Wrestling (NJPW), mainly appearing into the NJPW Strong brand.

== Professional wrestling career ==
=== Independent circuit (2018–present) ===
Barrales made his professional wrestling debut at SBW Dance with the Devil, an event promoted by Santino Bros. Wrestling on March 30, 2018, where he teamed up with Cameron Gates as "The Bomb Squad" in a losing effort against Dom Kubrick and Robby Phoenix in tag team competition. He is known for his tenures with various promotions from the American independent scene with which he has shared brief or longer stints such as FIST Combat, LA Lucha, Santino Bros. Wrestling, Ground Zero Pro and others.

=== New Japan Pro Wrestling (2020–present) ===
Barrales graduated from the NJPW LA Dojo in 2020. He made his debut in the company in the third night of the 2020 New Japan Cup USA from August 21, where he teamed up with Danny Limelight in a losing effort against Rocky Romero and Adrian Quest.

Barrales competed in various signature events promoted by NJPW. As for the Fighting Spirit Unleashed branch of events, he made his first appearance on the first night of the 2020 edition of the Fighting Spirit Unleashed from September 4, he teamed up with Clark Connors in a losing effort against Alex Zayne and Fred Rosser. One year later at the 2021 edition, from August 16, he teamed up with Kevin Knight in a losing effort against Yuji Nagata and Yuya Uemura. At the 2020 Lion's Break Crown tournament, Barrales fell short to Logan Riegel in the first rounds. He made his debut in the New Japan Cup USA at the 2021 edition of the competition where he fell short to Tom Lawlor in the first rounds. At Resurgence 2021 on August 14, Barrales teamed up with Jordan Clearwater and Kevin Knight in a losing effort against Barrett Brown, Misterioso and Bateman in a dark six-man tag team match.

At Capital Collision 2022 on May 14, he teamed up with Yuya Uemura, David Finlay, Tanga Loa and Fred Rosser in a losing effort against Team Filthy (Tom Lawlor, Jorel Nelson, Royce Isaacs, J.R. Kratos, and Danny Limelight). At Forbidden Door 2022 on June 26, he teamed up with Yuya Uemura, Alex Coughlin and Kevin Knight in a losing effort against Max Caster and Gunn Club (Billy Gunn, Austin Gunn, and Colten Gunn). At Lonestar Shootout 2022, he teamed up with Fred Rosser and Alex Coughlin on the second night where they fell short to Team Filthy (J. R. Kratos, Royce Isaacs and Tom Lawlor). At Rumble on 44th Street, Barrales competed on both of the event's nights, first on October 27, 2022, where he teamed up with Kevin Knight to defeat Forever Hooligans (Alex Koslov and Rocky Romero), and on October 28 where he and Knight unsuccessfully challenged reigning champions Aussie Open (Kyle Fletcher and Mark Davis) for the Strong Openweight Tag Team Championship in a three-way match which also involved The Motor City Machine Guns (Alex Shelley and Chris Sabin) who won the bout and became new champions.

At Battle in the Valley 2023 on February 18, Barrales teamed up with Kushida, Volador Jr., and Kevin Knight to defeat Máscara Dorada, Josh Alexander, Adrian Quest and Rocky Romero. At Capital Collision on April 15, 2023, he teamed up with Chaos (Rocky Romero, Chuck Taylor and Lio Rush) and Clark Connors in a losing effort against Volador Jr., Jet Setters (Kushida and Kevin Knight), Mike Bailey and Gabriel Kidd. At Resurgence 2023 on May 21, he defeated Bateman in one of the preshow bouts. On the first night of the NJPW Independence Day from June 4, 2023, he fell short to Bad Dude Tito in singles competition. On the second night from June 5, he teamed up with Tomohiro Ishii and Hiroshi Tanahashi to defeat Team Filthy (Tom Lawlor, Jorel Nelson and Royce Isaacs). At All Star Junior Festival USA 2023 on August 19, he teamed up with Rich Swann and Ryusuke Taguchi to defeat Jack Cartwheel, Real1 and Starboy Charlie.

Barrales competed in the 2023 edition of the Super Junior Tag League in which he teamed up with Ryusuke Taguchi and scored a total of four points after going against the teams of TJP and Francesco Akira, Sho and Yoshinobu Kanemaru, El Desperado and Master Wato, Clark Connors and Drilla Moloney, Bushi and Titán, Kushida and Kevin Knight, Robbie Eagles and Kushida, Yoh and Musashi, and Douki and Taka Michinoku.

=== Impact Wrestling (2023) ===
Barrales often competed in various promotions as a developmental talent sent by NJPW. At Multiverse United 2, a cross-over event promoted by NJPW and Impact Wrestling on August 20, 2023, Barrales teamed up with "The World" (El Phantasmo, Josh Alexander, PCO) and Guerrillas of Destiny (Tama Tonga and Tanga Loa)) in a losing effort against Bullet Club (Kenta, ABC (Ace Austin and Chris Bey) and Bullet Club War Dogs (Alex Coughlin, Clark Connors and David Finlay)).

== Championships and accomplishments ==
- New Japan Pro Wrestling
  - Copa Fantastica (2024)
- FIST COMBAT
  - Get Fist'd Television Championship (1 time)
