= Strong Women's Championship =

Professional wrestling championship

- The Strong Women's Championship belt

Details
- Promotion: New Japan Pro-Wrestling; World Wonder Ring Stardom
- Brand: Strong
- Date established: April 27, 2023
- Current champion: Alex Windsor
- Date won: March 8, 2026

Other names
- Strong Women's Championship (2023–present); NJPW Strong Women's Championship
Statistics
- First champion: Willow Nightingale
- Longest reign: Mercedes Moné (313 days)
- Shortest reign: Willow Nightingale (45 days)
- Oldest champion: Syuri (36 years, 10 months and 27 days)
- Youngest champion: AZM (22 years, 7 months and 8 days)
- Heaviest champion: Willow Nightingale (183 lb (83 kg))
- Lightest champion: AZM (110 lb (50 kg))

The Strong Women's Championship (Japanese: STRONG女子王座, Hepburn: STRONG Joshi Ōza) is a women's professional wrestling world championship owned by the New Japan Pro-Wrestling (NJPW) promotion. The creation of the championship was announced by NJPW on April 27, 2023. The title is exclusively featured on NJPW's Strong brand and is usually defended at NJPW Strong branded shows in America. The inaugural champion was Willow Nightingale. Alex Windsor is the reigning champion in her first reign. She won the title by defeating Syuri at Wrestle Queendom XIII in London, England on March 8, 2026.

== History ==
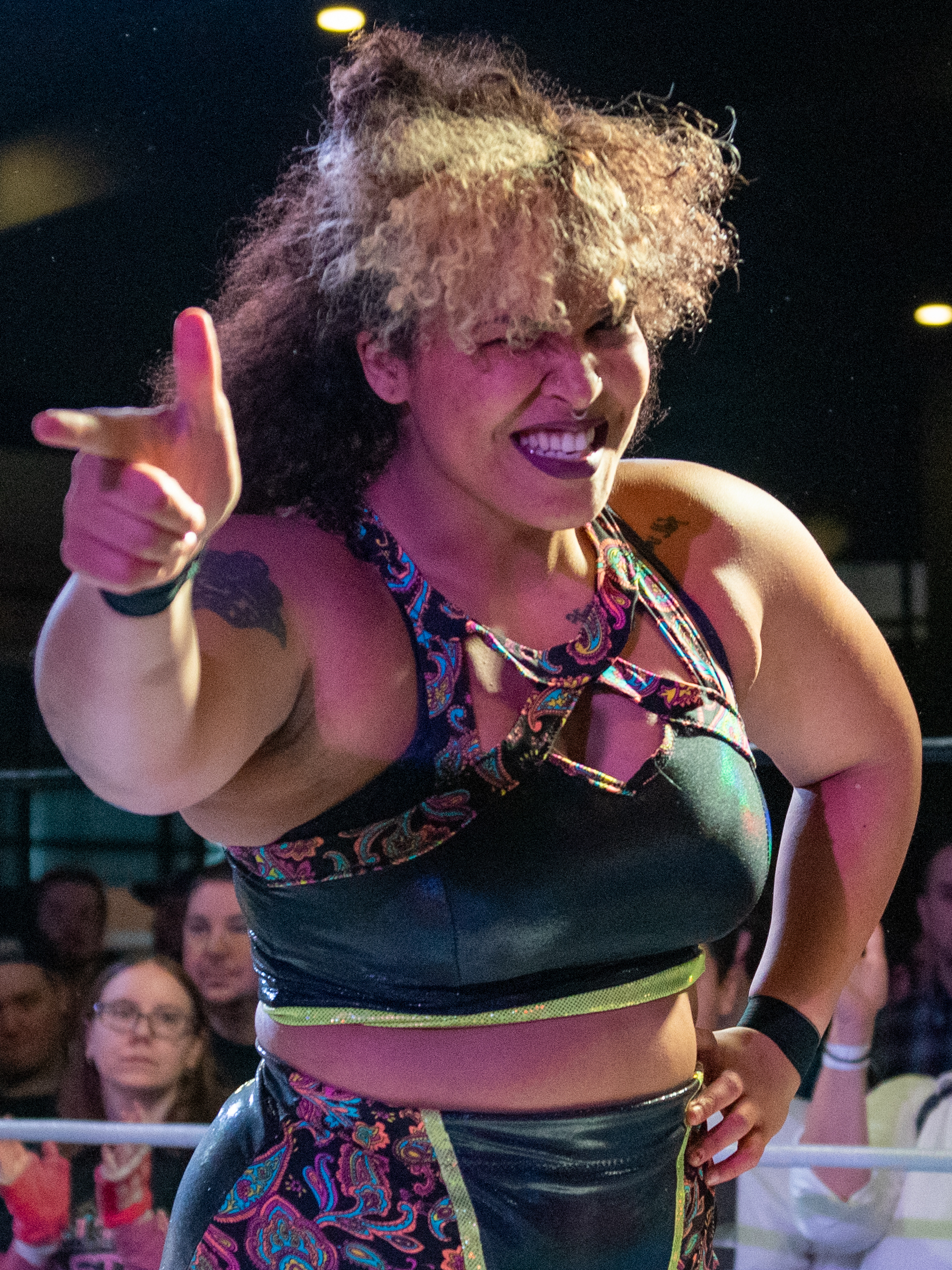
The inaugural Strong Women's Champion, Willow Nightingale

In 2022, New Japan Pro-Wrestling (NJPW) established a women's division. On July 29 of that year, the promotion created the IWGP Women's Championship, the first women's title in the company's history, which was first held by Kairi. The championship was created to be the top title of NJPW's women's division and was intended to be defended on NJPW events in Japan and on events promoted by NJPW's then-sister promotion World Wonder Ring Stardom (Stardom), a joshi puroresu promotion.

On April 27, 2023, NJPW announced the creation of the Strong Women's Championship, the top women's championship of the promotion's American subsidiary Strong Live. The promotion additionally announced a four-woman single-elimination tournament to determine the inaugural champion to be held at Resurgence on May 21, in Long Beach, California. The tournament featured representatives from NJPW's partners All Elite Wrestling (AEW), Consejo Mundial de Lucha Libre (CMLL), and Stardom. The tournament participants were former IWGP Women's Champion Mercedes Moné (NJPW), Momo Kohgo (Stardom), Stephanie Vaquer (CMLL), and Willow Nightingale (AEW). At Resurgence, Nightingale became the inaugural champion by defeating Moné in the finals.

=== Inaugural championship tournament (2023) ===
Semi-finals; Resurgence (May 21)
Mercedes Moné	Pin
Stephanie Vaquer	11:55
Momo Kohgo	9:37
Willow Nightingale	Pin

Finals; Resurgence (May 21)
Mercedes Moné	13:34
Willow Nightingale	Pin

The first defense of the title was Nightingale's successful defense against Emi Sakura on the June 2, 2023 episode of AEW Rampage (taped on May 31, 2023).

== Reigns ==
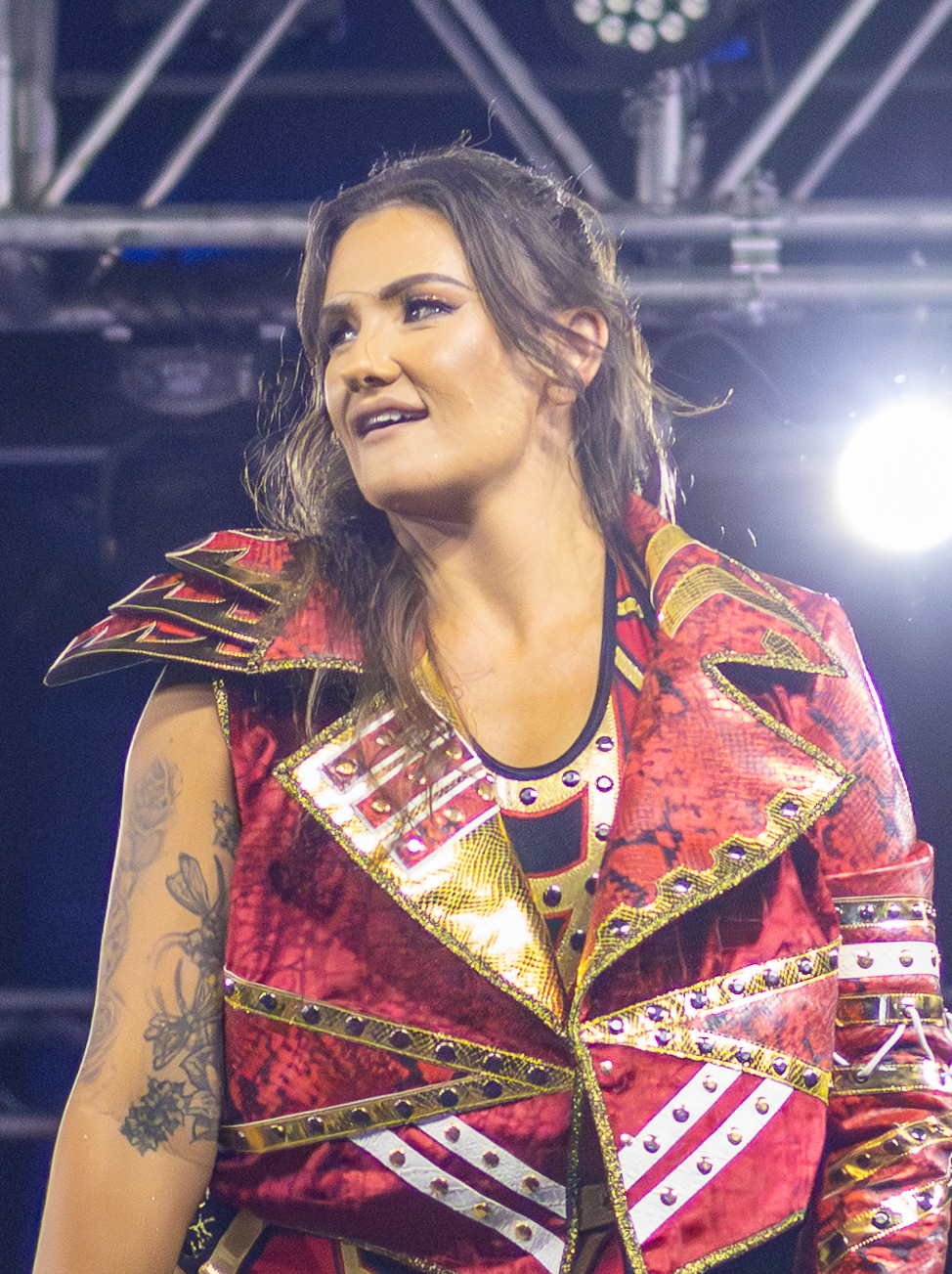
Current champion Alex Windsor

As of November 13, 2026, there have been eight reigns between eight different champions. Willow Nightingale was the inaugural champion. Syuri is the oldest champion at 36 years old, while AZM the youngest at 22 years old. Mercedes Moné's reign is the longest at 313 days, while Nightingale's reign is the shortest at 45 days.

Alex Windsor is the current champion in her first reign. She defeated Syuri on March 8, 2026 in London, England at Wrestle Queendom XIII (a Pro-Wrestling: EVE event) to win the title.

Key
No.	Overall reign number
Reign	Reign number for the specific champion
Days	Number of days held
Defenses	Number of successful defenses
+	Current reign is changing daily

No.	Champion	Championship change			Reign statistics			Notes	Ref.
No.	Champion	Date	Event	Location	Reign	Days	Defenses	Notes	Ref.
New Japan Pro Wrestling (NJPW) and World Wonder Ring Stardom (ST★RDOM)
1	Willow Nightingale	May 21, 2023	Resurgence	Long Beach, CA	1	45	2	Defeated Mercedes Moné in the finals of a four-woman single-elimination tournament to become the inaugural champion.	
2	Giulia	July 5, 2023	Independence Day; Night 2	Tokyo, Japan	1	249	9		
3	Stephanie Vaquer	March 10, 2024	Cinderella Tournament; Night 2	Tokyo, Japan	1	112	4		
4	Mercedes Moné	June 30, 2024	Forbidden Door	Elmont, NY	1	313	4	This was a Winner Takes All match also for Moné's AEW TBS Championship.	
5	AZM	May 9, 2025	Resurgence	Ontario, CA	1	141	1	This was a three-way match also involving Mina Shirakawa.	
6	Saya Kamitani	September 27, 2025	Stardom in Korakuen	Tokyo, Japan	1	99	1	This was a Winner Takes All match in which Kamitani's World of Stardom Championship was also on the line.	
7	Syuri	January 4, 2026	Wrestle Kingdom 20	Tokyo, Japan	1	63	0	This was a Winner Takes All match in which Syuri's IWGP Women's Championship was also on the line.	
8	Alex Windsor	March 8, 2026	Wrestle Queendom XIII	London, England	1	250+	1	This was a Pro-Wrestling: EVE event.	

== Combined reigns ==
As of November 13, 2026.

†	Indicates the current champion

Rank	Wrestler	No. of reigns	Combined defenses	Combined days
1	Mercedes Moné	1	4	313
2	Alex Windsor †	1	1	250+
3	Giulia	1	9	249
4	AZM	1	1	141
5	Stephanie Vaquer	1	4	112
6	Saya Kamitani	1	1	99
7	Syuri	1	0	63
8	Willow Nightingale	1	2	45
