= Fred Rosser =

American wrestler (born 1983)

- Rosser in 2015

Personal information
- Born: Frederick Douglas Rosser III; November 2, 1983 (age 43) Union Township, New Jersey, U.S.
- Education: Fairleigh Dickinson University

Professional wrestling career
- Ring name(s): Darren Young; Fred Rosser; Fred Sampson; Fred Sanford; Frederick of Hollywood; Officer Sampson
- Billed height: 6 ft 1 in (1.85 m)
- Billed weight: 239 lb (108 kg)
- Billed from: Miami, Florida
- Trained by: Kevin Knight; Florida Championship Wrestling
- Debut: September 11, 2002

Frederick Douglas Rosser III (born November 2, 1983) is an American professional wrestler and trainer. He is signed to New Japan Pro Wrestling (NJPW), where he performs on the Strong brand.

He began his professional career in 2002, performing for Northeastern and Mid-Atlantic independent promotions including Chaotic Wrestling, East Coast Wrestling Association, Independent Wrestling Federation and the National Wrestling Alliance. He signed with WWE in 2009 and was assigned to its developmental territory Florida Championship Wrestling as Darren Young. He participated in the first season of NXT in 2010. Later that year, he debuted on the main roster as part of The Nexus. In 2012, Young formed The Prime Time Players with Titus O'Neil, with whom he is a one-time WWE Tag Team Champion. In 2013, he publicly came out as gay, becoming the first publicly gay wrestler to be signed to WWE. He was released from WWE in 2017 and returned to performing on the independent scene before signing with New Japan Pro-Wrestling (NJPW) in 2020, where he became a one-time Strong Openweight Champion and serves as a trainer at the NJPW Academy.

== Early life ==
Rosser was born in Union and was interested in becoming a professional wrestler as a teenager, wrestling in several backyard wrestling federations. He attended Union High School in New Jersey, where he played American football, both offensively and defensively. He attended Fairleigh Dickinson University, where he played football for a year before deciding to focus on his academic studies and professional wrestling.

== Professional wrestling career ==
=== Early career (2002–2009) ===
Rosser became interested in becoming a professional wrestler as a teenager, wrestling in several backyard wrestling federations. He researched a number of wrestling schools before deciding on Camp IWF in West Paterson, New Jersey. This was due in part to his employer, whose uncle was a friend of a local wrestler training there at the time, and helped him enroll in the wrestling school.

Rosser made his professional debut on September 11, 2002, and spent several years on the independent circuit, including wrestling for the Independent Wrestling Federation and Chaotic Wrestling during his early career. On May 17, 2003, he won his first major title when he defeated the IWF Heavyweight Champion in Woodland Park, New Jersey and held it for over half a year until losing to Roman on January 17, 2004. It was at a house show in Chaotic Wrestling that he was first noticed by promoter Jim Kettner and invited to compete for the East Coast Wrestling Association where he made his debut in the summer of 2004. Shortly after entering the promotion, Rosser began feuding with Prince Nana over the ECWA Mid Atlantic Championship and eventually defeated him for the title in Newark, Delaware on September 18, 2004. He lost the title to Nick Malakai less than two months later.

During 2005 and 2006, Rosser made several appearances for WWE on its weekly programs Sunday Night Heat and Velocity as well as in dark matches on SmackDown and Raw.

=== World Wrestling Entertainment/WWE (2009–2017, 2026) ===
==== Florida Championship Wrestling (2009–2010) ====
In May 2009, Rosser signed a WWE developmental contract and was sent to WWE's developmental territory, Florida Championship Wrestling, under the name Darren Young. In FCW, Young was in a tag team called "The South Beach Party Boys" with Percy Watson.

==== The Nexus (2010–2011) ====
On February 16, 2010, it was announced that he would compete as part of the first season of WWE NXT, mentored by CM Punk.

On February 23, 2010, Young made his debut on NXT with a character described as a "South Beach Party Boy", losing his debut match to David Otunga. His storyline had mentor CM Punk showing apathy towards him, claiming he had no idea why he's in NXT and did not want to train Young unless he accepted his Straight-edge lifestyle. Despite this, Punk and his disciples, Luke Gallows and Serena, helped Young win his rematch against Otunga the following week. Young was ranked eight in the first Pros' Poll. After the pros' poll, Young decided to join Straight Edge Society in an attempt to improve, only to change his mind before getting his hair shaved off. CM Punk decided to forgive him for standing up to him when he defeated Luke Gallows with Young's own hair on the line. Because of this victory, CM Punk had then been interested in Young's potential, but in turn started feuding with a jealous Luke Gallows. On May 11 in the second Pros poll, Young was ranked fifth out of the six remaining contestants and narrowly escaped elimination. The following week, however, Young was eliminated from the competition.

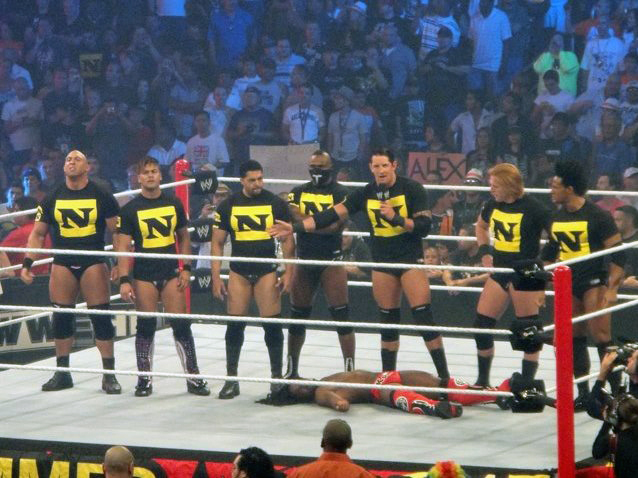
Young (far right) with the other members of The Nexus at SummerSlam

The week following the Season 1 finale, Young, along with the other season one NXT rookies turned heel and interfered in the main event match on Raw between John Cena and Young's former Pro, CM Punk, and attacked both wrestlers, the announce team and the ring announcer Justin Roberts, and dismantled the ring area and surrounding equipment. On the June 14, 2010, edition of Raw, the rookies attacked general manager Bret Hart, when he refused to give them contracts. The following week on Raw, Vince McMahon fired Hart and announced that a new general manager had been hired, one that had signed all seven season one NXT rookies to contracts. The following week, the group was named The Nexus. On the July 5 episode of Raw, The Nexus tried to attack John Cena as he confronted Wade Barrett during their "truce" with one another. The segment ended with The Nexus leaving without Young, when other Raw wrestlers arrived to aid Cena, and Young was assaulted by Cena to end the show. Due to Cena's actions, the new general manager booked Cena in a 7 on 1 handicap match against The Nexus scheduled for the following week. Young did not participate due to injuries caused by Cena the previous week but The Nexus won the match. He returned at Money in the Bank with the rest of The Nexus, sporting a new haircut and costing Cena the WWE Championship against Sheamus. After the match, Cena attacked Young and fellow Nexus teammate, Michael Tarver. The Nexus continued to feud with Cena and the Raw roster, resulting in a seven-on-seven elimination tag team match at SummerSlam. Young was the first person to be eliminated from the match, when he submitted to Daniel Bryan in under a minute, and The Nexus lost the match. On the next episode of Raw the members of The Nexus fought in individual matches against members of the victorious Team WWE with the stipulation that losing a match would have them exiled from the group. Young chose to face John Cena, but failed to win and was exiled and attacked as a result.

Young returned on the September 6 episode of Raw, distracting Barrett and costing him a match against Randy Orton thus turned Young face. On the October 4 episode of Raw, Young participated in a battle royal to determine the number one contender to the WWE Championship, but was eliminated by The Nexus. Young had his first singles match since leaving The Nexus on the October 7 episode of Superstars, losing to William Regal. Young had his first win in singles competition on the October 14 airing of Superstars defeating Primo. Young teamed up with Tatsu in a losing effort against The Usos in mid November on two occasions. Young got his first victory of 2011 when he teamed with Primo, Yoshi Tatsu and David Hart Smith to defeat Zack Ryder, William Regal and The Usos on the January 13 episode of Superstars.

==== Return to NXT (2011–2012) ====
In March 2011, Young was selected as one of six former NXT contestants to return to the show in its fifth season, NXT Redemption. During this season, Young was mentored by Chavo Guerrero Jr. In the season premiere, Young defeated Jacob Novak and won the first challenge to earn himself "redemption points". On the April 12 episode of NXT, Young attacked Titus O'Neil after their match and tried to attack O'Neil's pro Hornswoggle, but was stopped by Guerrero. He turned heel, when he attacked Hornswoggle, and later he and Guerrero faced O'Neil and different tag team partners on several occasions. On the April 19 edition of Redemption, Young faced Hornswoggle in single match. During their match, Chavo Guerrero gave Young a blindfold but in the end Hornswoggle won after a Tadpole splash. On the May 3 edition of Redemption, Young lost to his Pro, Chavo Guerrero, with Hornswoggle as a special guest referee. On the May 10 edition of Redemption, Hornswoggle didn't appear on NXT and accused by Hornswoggle Rookie's Titus O'Neil. The following week, it was revealed Chavo Guerrero kidnapped Hornswoggle and hid Hornswoggle in the box. Then, Guerrero and Young was attack Hornswoggle in the ring until O'Neil made a save. The feud was settled when Titus O'Neil and Darren Young faced each other in a No Disqualification Match on the May 24 episode of NXT Redemption. The match ended with Titus O'Neil a victor after Hornswoggle interfered in a match which O'Neil attack Guerrero and Young. Guerrero was later released from WWE, leaving Young on his own. In August he formed an alliance with Derrick Bateman and the duo teamed up against O'Neil and NXT host Matt Striker, but were defeated. Young then moved into a feud with Striker, defeating him on two consecutive occasions. After Young attacked Striker following a handshake, William Regal intervened, saving Striker. Two weeks later, Young was defeated by Regal in a singles match. Young then formed an alliance with JTG and defeated Striker and O'Neil. After the match they were attacked by the Usos.

Young was suspended for 30 days on October 5, 2011. Following his suspension, Young returned on the November 16, 2011, episode of NXT and assaulted Titus O'Neil. Young was then able to get the better of O'Neil twice in tag team matches. The conclusion to Young's feud with O'Neil came when O'Neil defeated Young in a no disqualifications match.

==== The Prime Time Players (2012–2014) ====
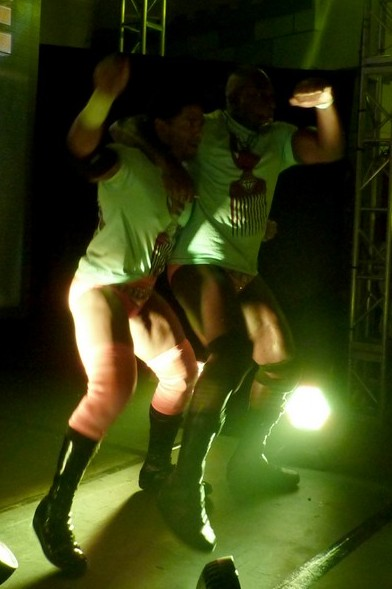
The Prime Time Players in November 2013

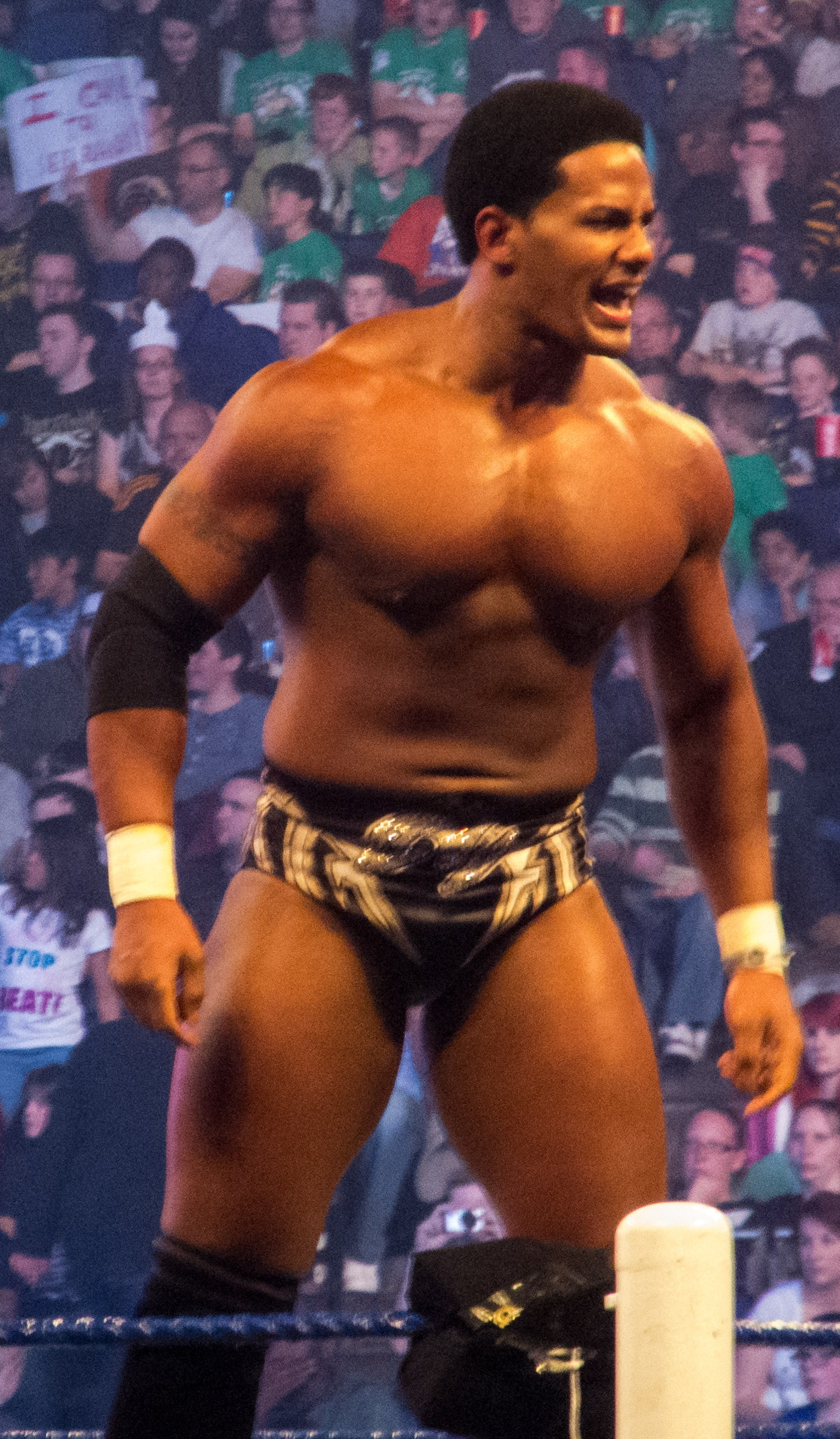
Young in April 2012

O'Neil then turned heel and formed an alliance with Young. Young and O'Neil feuded with Percy Watson and Alex Riley in February 2012, defeating them twice. In March, while he and O'Neil were feuding with the Usos, Young started chasing the affections of Tamina.

On the April 18 episode of NXT, Young and O'Neil were signed by John Laurinaitis to the SmackDown brand. The team made their debut for the brand on the April 20 episode of SmackDown with a victory over the Usos. The team suffered their first team loss against the WWE Tag Team Champions Kofi Kingston and R-Truth on the May 18 edition of Smackdown. At the No Way Out pay-per-view in June, minutes before Young and O'Neil teamed up to defeat Justin Gabriel and Tyson Kidd, Primo & Epico and the Usos in a four-way #1 tag team match to earn a future shot at the WWE Tag Team Championship, after A.W. turned on his clients, Epico and Primo. On the July 16 episode of Raw, Young and O'Neil unsuccessfully challenged Kofi Kingston and R-Truth for the WWE Tag Team Championship. On the August 10 episode of SmackDown, they defeated Primo and Epico in a #1 contenders match via disqualification when A.W. provoked Kingston and R-Truth, who were on commentary, into interfering in the match. That same day, A. W. was released from his contract.

Prime Time Players received their title shots at SummerSlam, but were again defeated by Kingston and R-Truth. On the September 7 edition of Smackdown, Prime Time Players defeated Primo and Epico and The Usos in a triple threat tag team match to earn another shot at the title. But on Raw three days later, Prime Time Players lost their title shot to the team of Daniel Bryan and Kane (soon to be known as Team Hell No). At the Survivor Series pay-per-view, Young took part in a 10 man elimination tag team match, but was eliminated by Rey Mysterio. Young also competed in the 2013 Royal Rumble entering at entrant 15, but was quickly eliminated by Kofi Kingston. On the August 19, 2013, edition of Raw, the Prime Time Players turned face in a winning effort against the Real Americans (Jack Swagger and Antonio Cesaro).

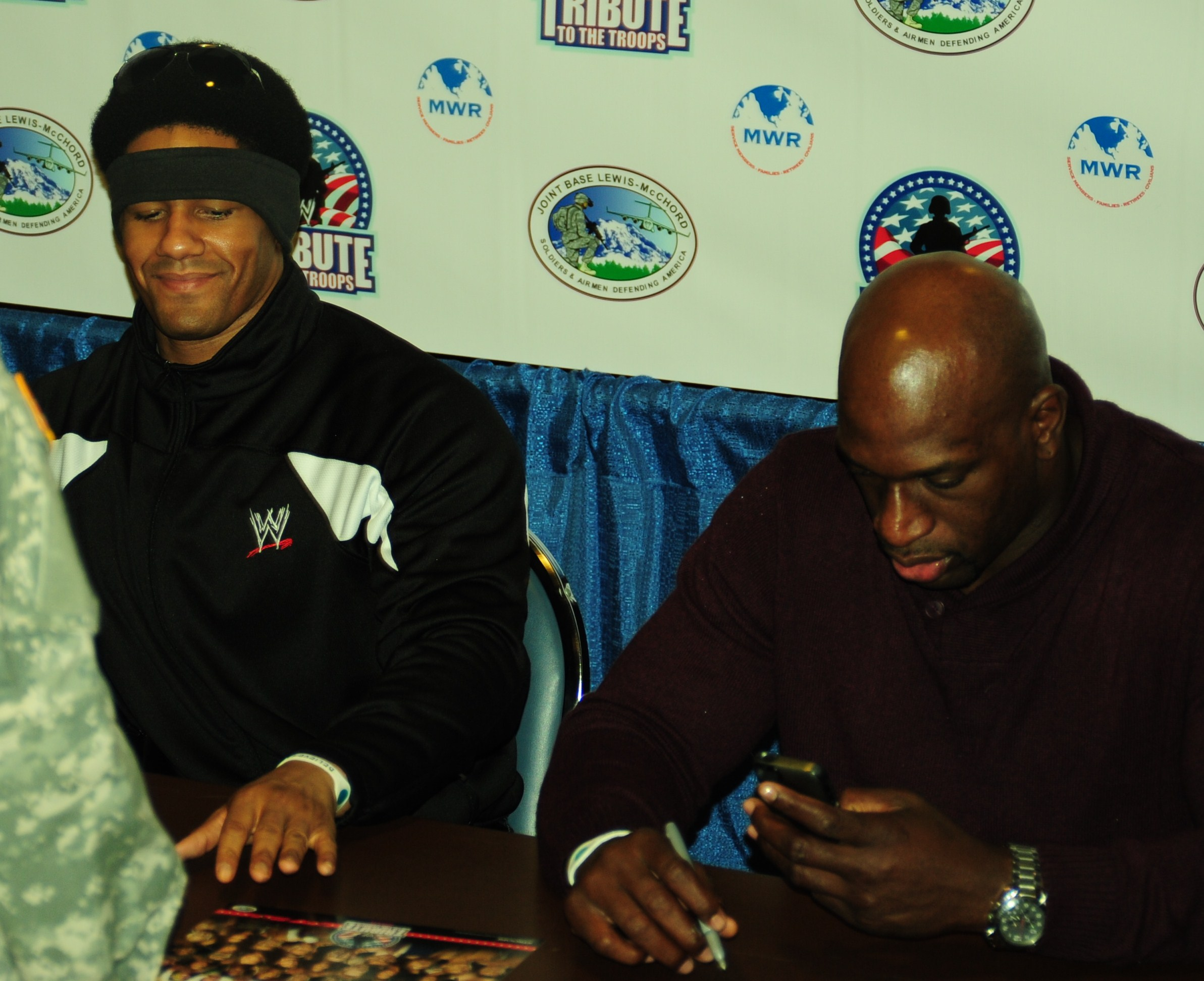
Young and Titus O'Neil signing autographs in December 2013

The face turn had been speculated about for some months, especially after Young's real-life coming out the previous week which received mainstream media coverage. The team gained a push, challenging for the WWE Tag Team Championship, but lost a match to the Shield. The duo also sided with other face wrestlers from the active roster, only to get punished by COO Triple H for preventing Daniel Bryan from being critically injured by Randy Orton. The Prime Time Players were amongst the select few ordered to battle The Shield in separately sanctioned 3 on 1 handicap matches on the September 20 edition of SmackDown, as punishment for their intervention.

==== Singles competition (2014–2015) ====
On the January 31, 2014, episode of SmackDown after Young was pinned in a tag team match against RybAxel (Ryback and Curtis Axel), O'Neil attacked him and disbanded the team. On SmackDown the following week, Young attacked O'Neil backstage after his interview. Young picked up a victory over Damien Sandow on the February 14 edition of SmackDown before being attacked by O'Neil, which turned into a brawl and left O'Neil in tattered clothes. They fought at the Elimination Chamber, with the victor being O'Neil. However, Young defeated O'Neil in a rematch on Main Event. At WrestleMania XXX, Young was in the André the Giant Memorial Battle Royal, where he was eliminated by 3MB. At a WWE live event on April 12, Young was injured in a match against Fandango, and on April 16, he underwent surgery to repair a torn ACL in his left knee that would take him out of action for four to six months.

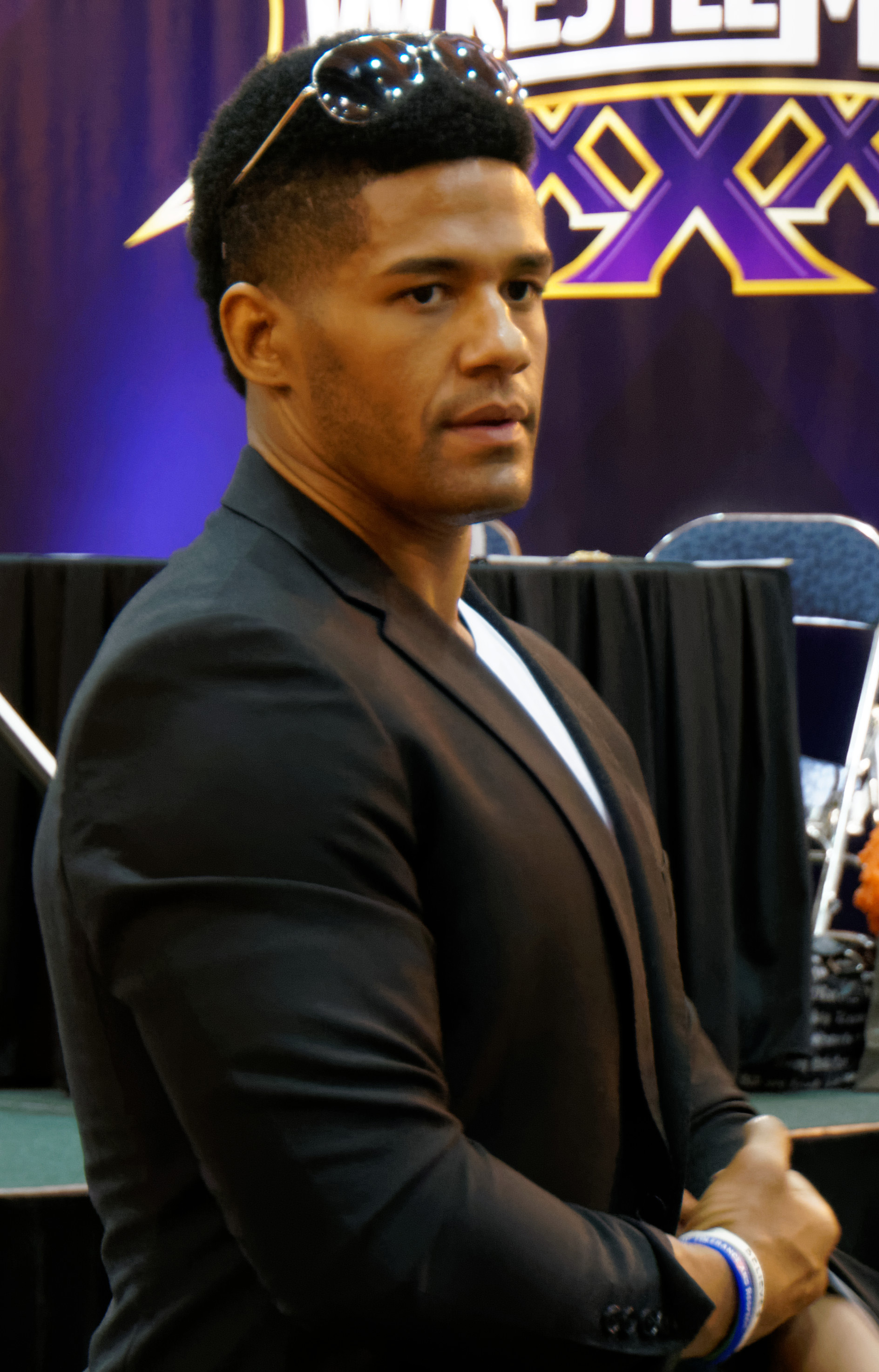
Darren Young at WWE's WrestleMania XXX Axxess on April 4, 2014.

==== The Prime Time Players reunion (2015–2016) ====
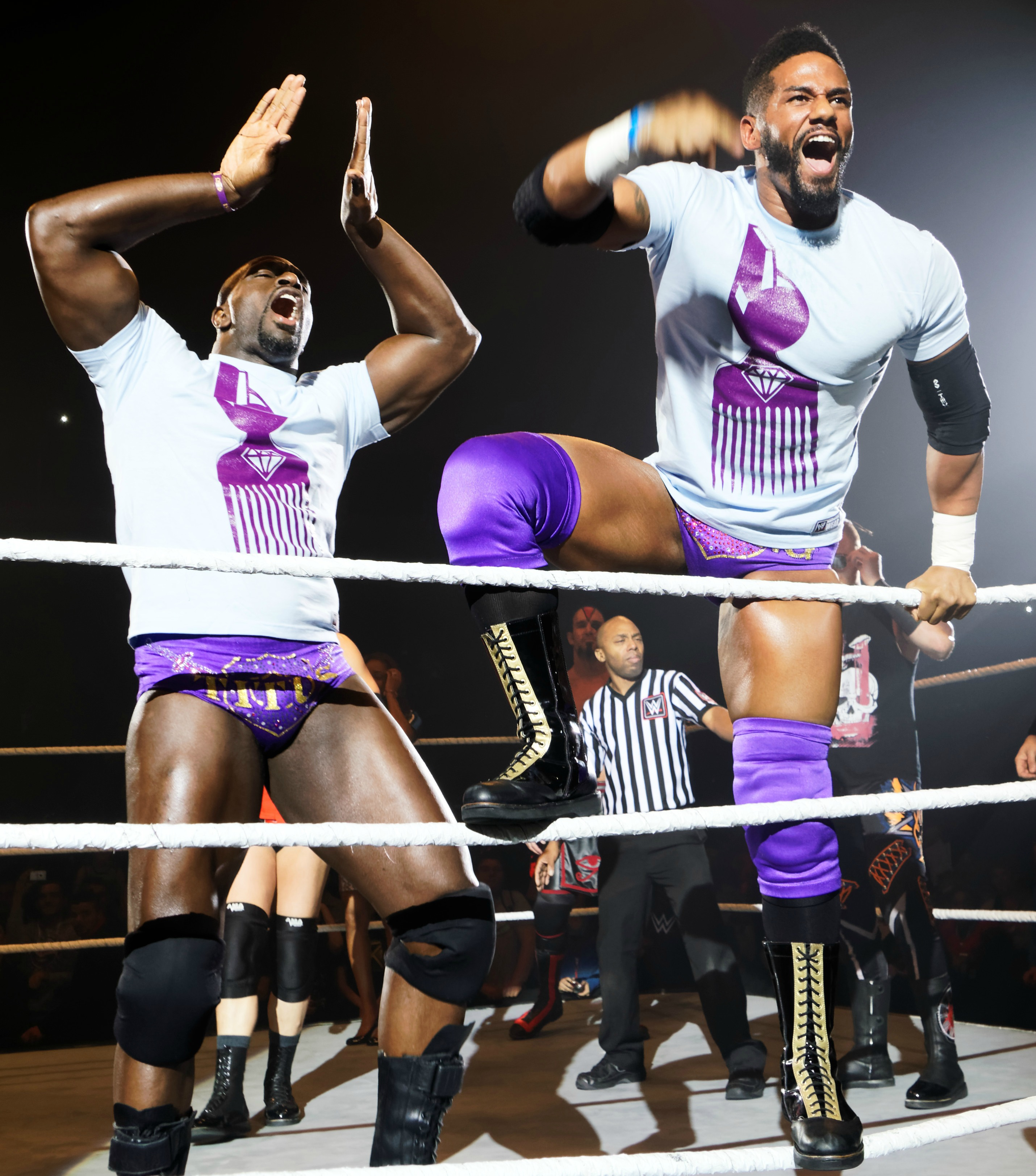
The Prime Time Players in April 2015

On the January 5, 2015, episode of Raw, Young appeared with the rest of the WWE roster in the opening segment. His official return came on the February 16 episode of Raw, where Young and an unnamed independent wrestler, Kevin Kross, were scheduled to face The Ascension, but were attacked by them before the match, leading to Young's former tag team partner Titus O'Neil making the save. This turned O'Neil face again and the Prime Time Players reunited. On the February 23 edition of Raw, The Prime Time Players defeated The Ascension to hand them their first loss as part of the main roster, only to then being attacked by the two. Young participated in the 2nd Annual André the Giant Memorial Battle Royal at WrestleMania 31, where he was eliminated by Ryback.

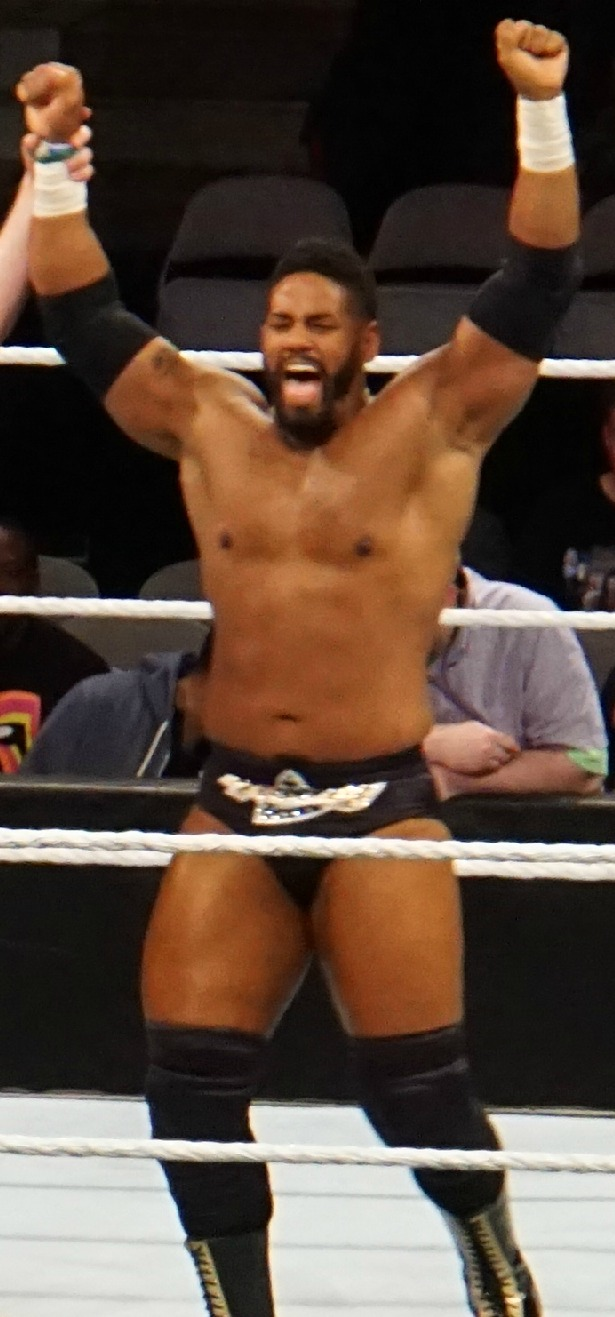
Young in March 2015

At Elimination Chamber, The Prime Time Players participated in the first ever tag team Elimination Chamber match for the WWE Tag Team Championship, where they were the last team to be eliminated by The New Day (Big E, Kofi Kingston and Xavier Woods). At Money in the Bank, the Prime Time Players defeated The New Day to win the title. At Battleground, The Prime Time Players retained the title against The New Day but dropped the title back to The New Day on August 23 at SummerSlam in a fatal–four-way match, also involving The Lucha Dragons and Los Matadores. Young and O'Neil would invoke their rematch clause for the September 14 episode of Raw, which they lost.

Towards the end of 2015, O'Neil and Young began focusing on singles careers. Young teamed with Damien Sandow on the Royal Rumble 2016 Kickoff Show in a Fatal 4-Way tag team match in a losing effort. On the February 2, 2016, taping of Main Event, the duo returned to team with The Usos to defeat the Ascension, Stardust and Tyler Breeze. They have since quietly disbanded when O'Neil received a 60-day suspension after the February 8 episode of Raw after an alleged physical altercation with Vince McMahon. At WrestleMania 32, Young entered the third André the Giant Memorial Battle Royal and came within the final three, being eliminated by Kane.

==== Bob Backlund's protégé and departure (2016–2017) ====
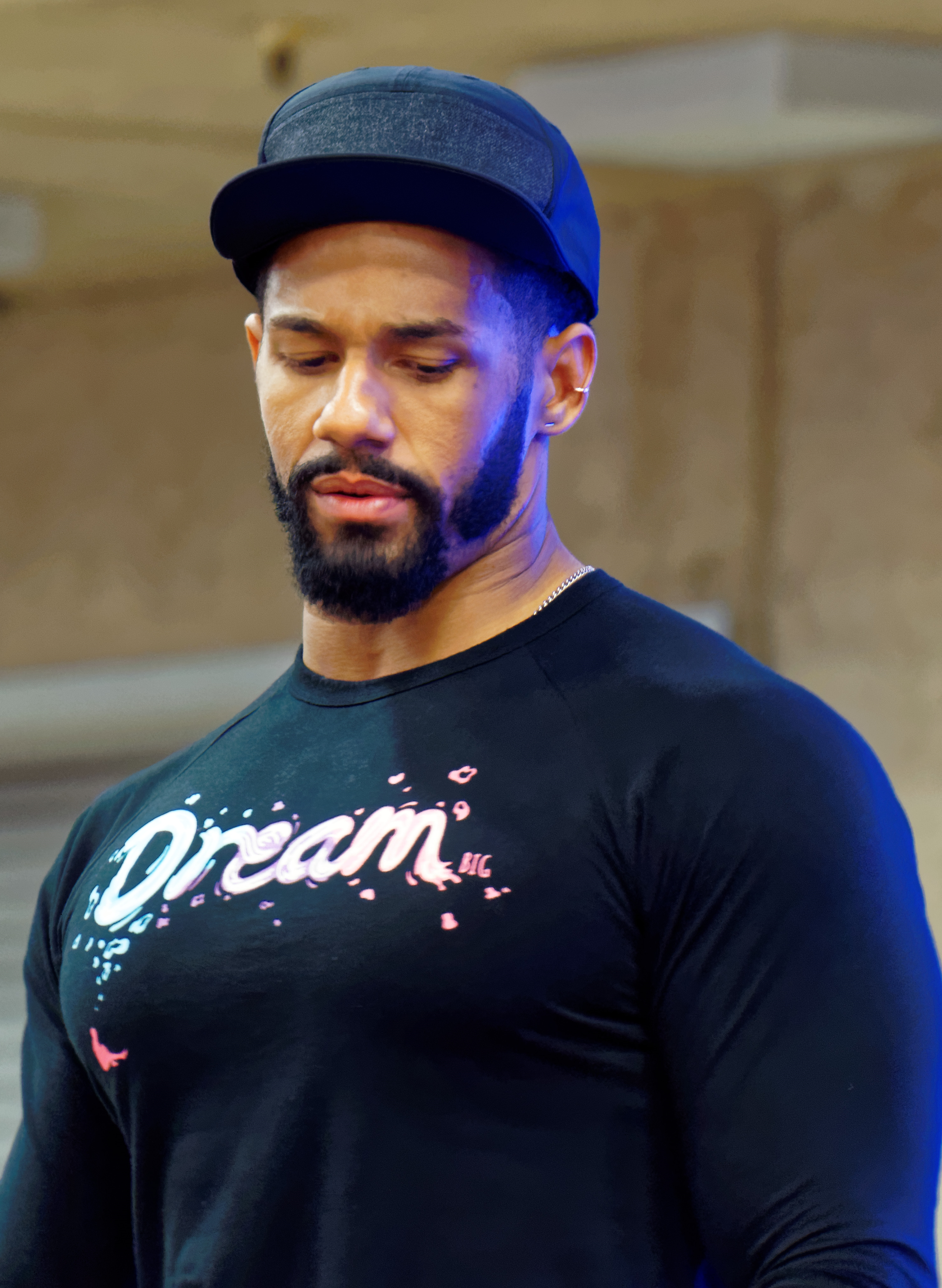
Young in April 2016

On the May 5 episode of SmackDown, Bob Backlund agreed to be Young's life coach, in a campaign to "Make Darren Young Great Again", a parody of Donald Trump's "Make America Great Again" campaign slogan. Throughout the next couple of months on Raw and SmackDown, various vignettes featuring Young and Backlund aired, with Backlund assuming the role of Young's life coach. In a "life lesson" segment on the July 4 episode of Raw, Backlund approved of Young adopting his famous Crossface chickenwing. The week after on Raw, Young won an 18-man battle royal (after Apollo Crews and Baron Corbin eliminated themselves) to become the #1 contender for The Miz's Intercontinental Championship at Battleground. The following week on Raw, Young defeated Alberto Del Rio, despite interference from The Miz. On July 19, Young with Backlund was drafted to the Raw brand as a result of the 2016 WWE draft. At Battleground, Young faced The Miz in a match that resulted in a Double Disqualification after he applied the Crossface Chickenwing to Miz outside the ring to protect Backlund from Miz and Maryse.

Young began a feud with his former tag team partner Titus O'Neil on the August 1 episode of Raw. O'Neil questioned Young's motives on being "great again". Later that night, he defeated Young when he pinned him while grabbing Young's tights. Afterwards, he got into a backstage altercation with Backlund before Young came to the defense of Backlund by attacking O'Neil. The week after on Raw, Young defeated O'Neil by pinning him while grabbing O'Neil's tights, mimicking the way O'Neil defeated him. On the August 15 episode of Raw, Young and O'Neil seemingly reconciled and were placed in a match against The Shining Stars. During the match, O'Neil attacked Young with a Clash of the Titus, allowing The Shining Stars to win the match. Young would once again defeat O'Neil on the August 29 episode of Raw. After the match, he was attacked by O'Neil. Young teamed with Neville to defeat O'Neil and Curtis Axel on the September 16 episode of Superstars to culminate the feud.

In January 2017, Young suffered an arm injury in a match against Epico on Main Event. On October 29, 2017, Young was released from his WWE contract without him reappearing on television.

==== Guest coach (2026) ====
On October 31, 2026, Rosser announced that he was working as a guest coach at the WWE Performance Center.

=== Chikara (2018) ===
On March 2, 2018, it was announced that Rosser, along with former Nexus co-members Michael Tarver and Justin Gabriel would be competing at that year's Chikara: King of Trios tournament.

=== New Japan Pro-Wrestling (2020–present) ===
On August 27, 2020, it was announced that Rosser had signed with New Japan Pro-Wrestling and would make his debut on the September 4 episode of Strong. In his first match, Rosser teamed up with Alex Zayne to face The DKC and Clark Connors, which Rosser and Zayne won. On October 24, Rosser faced Clark Connors in Connors' first match since winning the Lions Break Crown; Rosser won the match. In June, it was announced Rosser signed a contract with NJPW and would become a trainer at the NJPW Academy.

In 2022, Rosser began a feud with Tom Lawlor over the Strong Openweight Championship. At Collision in Philadelphia on May 15, Rosser defeated Lawlor by submission to win the title; the match carried a stipulation that Rosser would have to leave NJPW if he lost. During his reign, Rosser successfully defended the championship against Big Damo, Fred Yehi, TJP, Chris Dickinson, Jonathan Gresham, JR Kratos and Peter Avalon. Rosser lost the championship to Kenta at Battle in the Valley on February 18, 2023, ending his reign after seven successful defenses. Juice Robinson interfered in the match, allowing Kenta to win after Rosser had forced him to submit while the referee was incapacitated.

In 2024, Rosser formed the tag team Dirty Work with Tom Lawlor and continued competing on NJPW's United States shows. In 2025, Rosser continued making appearances for NJPW, including a victory over Matt Vandagriff at Resurgence on May 9. He also continued wrestling on NJPW Academy events until the school was shut down in November 2026.

=== National Wrestling Alliance (2021) ===
On March 23, 2021, Rosser made his National Wrestling Alliance debut, defeating Marshe Rockett and Matt Cross to become the Number One Contender for the NWA World Television Championship. He failed to defeat Da Pope who dropped the title to Tyrus in June 2021.

== Other media ==
Young appears in the video games WWE 2K14, WWE 2K15, WWE 2K16, WWE 2K17, and WWE 2K18

=== Filmography ===
Year	Title	Role	Notes
2013	Total Divas	Himself	
2013	The Ellen DeGeneres Show	Himself	

== Personal life ==
Rosser has cited Shawn Michaels and Ricky Steamboat as his favorite wrestlers.

In an interview released on August 15, 2013, he publicly came out as gay. While Pat Patterson, Chris Kanyon, and Orlando Jordan (bisexual) came out after either leaving the company or retiring, Rosser is the first professional wrestler ever to publicly come out while still signed to WWE. WWE released a statement in support of Rosser for being open about his sexuality, and various fellow wrestlers tweeted their support for him.

On April 26, 2017, Rosser disclosed that his mother is a lesbian during his interview with Afterbuzz TV.

== Championships and accomplishments ==
- Chaotic Wrestling
  - Chaotic Wrestling New England Championship (1 time)
  - Chaotic Wrestling Tag Team Championship (1 time) – with Rick Fuller
- East Coast Wrestling Association
  - ECWA Heavyweight Championship (2 times)
  - ECWA Mid Atlantic Championship (1 time)
- Independent Wrestling Federation
  - IWF Heavyweight Championship (2 times)
  - Commissioner's Cup Tag Team Tournament (2003) – with Hadrian
  - Commissioner's Cup Tag Team Tournament (2004) – with Kevin Knight
  - Commissioner's Cup Tag Team Tournament (2006) – with Franciz
  - Tournament of Champions (2004)
- National Wrestling Superstars
  - NWS Tag Team Championship (1 time) – with Bulldog Collare
- New Japan Pro-Wrestling
  - Strong Openweight Championship (1 time)
- Pro Wrestling Illustrated
  - Feud of the Year (2010) The Nexus vs. WWE
  - Inspirational Wrestler of the Year (2013)
  - Most Hated Wrestler of the Year (2010) As part of The Nexus
  - Ranked No. 89 of the top 500 wrestlers in the PWI 500 in 2013
- Rolling Stone
  - Most Deserved Push (2015) As a member of The Prime Time Players
- World Wrestling Entertainment / WWE
  - WWE Tag Team Championship (1 time) – with Titus O'Neil
  - Slammy Award for Shocker of the Year (2010) The debut of The Nexus
- Wrestling Observer Newsletter
  - Worst Feud of the Year (2016) vs. Titus O'Neil
