= Matt Vandagriff =

American professional wrestler

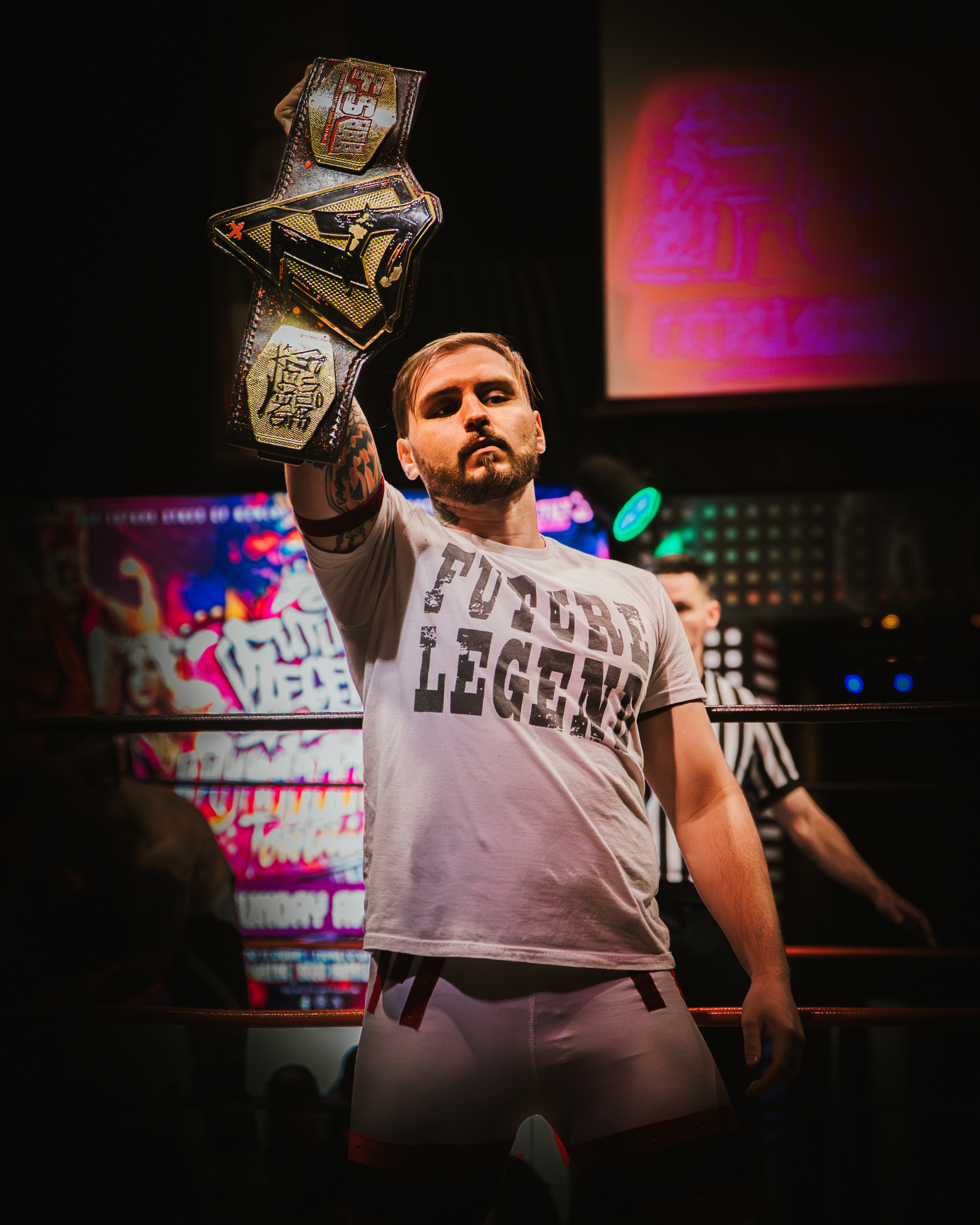
- Vandagriff in April 2025

Personal information
- Born: Oakdale, California

Professional wrestling career
- Ring name(s): Matt Vandagriff; Ace Of Knaves Aerial Chemist
- Billed height: 5 ft 11 in (180 cm)
- Billed weight: 205 lb (93 kg)
- Billed from: Oakdale, California
- Trained by: Santino Bros Wrestling Academy
- Debut: 2017

Matt Vandagriff is an American professional wrestler, He currently performs on the independent circuit. He is known for his work with Game Changer Wrestling (GCW) and New Japan Pro Wrestling (NJPW). He also has a brief appearance for All Elite Wrestling (AEW).

== Career ==
Vandagriff began his career in 2017, wrestling on the independent circuit in California. On June 11, 2022, he made his All Elite Wrestling debut on AEW Dark, teaming with Knull in a loss to Aaron Solo and Nick Comoroto. He began making appearances for Game Changer Wrestling in 2022.

In 2023, he made his New Japan Pro Wrestling debut, including the pre-show of the Fighting Spirit Unleashed. On January 13, 2024, he defeated Goldy at the pre-show of Battle in the Valley. On April 12, 2024, he defeated Zane Jay at Windy City Riot.

== Championships and accomplishments ==
- Future Stars of Wrestling
  - FSW No Limits Championship (2 times)
  - FSW Nevada State Championship (1 time)
  - FSW Future Legends Championship (1 time, inaugural)
  - FSW Tag Team Championship (1 time) – with Harlequin Of Hate
  - FSW Future Legends Title Tournament (2023)
- Venue Wrestling Entertainment
  - VWE International Championship (1 time)
