= NJPW Strong (brand) =

- Logo for the brand and the former television program as of August 7, 2020
- Product type: Professional wrestling
- Current owner: New Japan Pro-Wrestling
- Country: United States
- Introduced: August 7, 2020

NJPW Strong is a brand name utilized by the Japanese professional wrestling promotion New Japan Pro-Wrestling (NJPW) for its events in the United States.

== History ==
On October 21, 2019, NJPW announced the formation of an American subsidiary called "New Japan Pro-Wrestling of America" (NJoA) which aimed to expand NJPW's events into the North American market after promoting several co-promoted shows with Ring of Honor, Community Effort Orlando (CEO), and Jersey All Pro Wrestling (JAPW) and promoting stand-alone shows under the NJPW name including G1 Special in USA, Strong Style Evolved, G1 Special in San Francisco, Super J-Cup: 7th Stage, Fighting Spirit Unleashed, and the first night of G1 Climax 29. On July 31, 2020, NJPW announced a new weekly series titled N−JPW Strong, with its initial episodes taped during the inaugural New Japan Cup USA tournament. As part of NJPW's expansion into the United States, the series was also produced by NJoA. On April 1, 2022, in conjunction with WrestleCon during WrestleMania 38 weekend, NJPW held their first pay-per-view under the Strong branding with Lonestar Shootout at the Fairmont Dallas Hotel in Dallas, Texas.

On January 6, 2023, Hiroshi Tanahashi announced on his blog that the January Strong tapings would be the last, and that "overseas tournaments" would be held in a different format in the future. On January 30, NJPW announced that all of the promotion's future American events would be branded under the NJPW Strong name, and be available for purchase via pay-per-view (PPV) providers. Beginning with Battle in the Valley on February 18, the NJoA PPVs began airing as NJPW Strong Live. These PPV events later would air on NJPW World in hour-long installments known as NJPW Strong on Demand.

On March 30, 2023, NJPW promoted its first co-promoted events with Impact Wrestling titled Multiverse United at the Globe Theater in Los Angeles, California. On July 4, 2023 and July 5, 2023, NJPW held their first Strong-branded events outside the United States with their Independence Day pay-per-view at Korakuen Hall in Tokyo, Japan. Following the Resurgence pay-per-view, NJPW has quietly discontinued the Strong branding for events and has since used the branding for various championships.

On November 6, 2026, NJPW announced that New Japan Pro-Wrestling of America will cease operations and enter liquidation. TV Asahi will be taking over production of future North America shows.

== Championships and accomplishments ==
Championship	Current champion(s)	Reign	Date won	Days held	Location	Notes	Ref.
Strong Openweight Championship	Boltin Oleg	1	February 27, 2026	260+	Trenton, New Jersey, USA	Defeated Tomohiro Ishii at The New Beginning USA	
Strong Openweight Tag Team Championship	Los Hermanos Chávez (Ángel de Oro and Niebla Roja)	1	November 14, 2025	365+	Mexico City, Mexico	Defeated United Empire (TJP and Templario) at CMLL x Linkin Park Noche from Zero.	
Strong Women's Championship	Alex Windsor	1	March 8, 2026	251+	London, England	Defeated Syuri at Wrestle Queendom VIII. This was a Pro-Wrestling: EVE event.	
