= NJPW Strong =

New Japan Pro-Wrestling streaming television program

- Genre: Professional wrestling
- Created by: Takami Ohbari
- Written by: Gedo
- Directed by: Logan Chegwidden
- Presented by: Katsuyori Shibata, Hiroshi Tanahashi, and Shigeki Kiyono (Japanese language commentators); Kevin Kelly, Alex Koslov, Ian Riccaboni, and Matt Rehwoldt (English language commentators)
- Starring: New Japan Pro-Wrestling of America roster
- Countries of origin: Japan; United States
- Original languages: English; Japanese
- No. of seasons: 3
- No. of episodes: 126 (list of episodes)

Production
- Camera setup: Multi-camera setup
- Running time: 60 minutes
- Production companies: New Japan Pro-Wrestling; David Marquez Productions

Original release
- Network: NJPW World; FITE TV
- Release: August 7, 2020 – January 28, 2023

Related
- NJPW World Pro Wrestling

NJPW Strong is a professional wrestling streaming television program produced by Japanese professional wrestling promotion New Japan Pro-Wrestling (NJPW) and formerly its New Japan Pro-Wrestling of America (NJoA) subsidiary. The series premiered on August 7, 2020, airing on Saturdays at 8 pm ET on NJPW World and FITE TV until its final episode aired on January 28, 2023.

== History ==
=== Background and early format ===
On November 24, 2014, AXS TV, under the AXS TV Fights banner, announced that it had acquired a thirteen-episode series produced by TV Asahi featuring matches from New Japan Pro Wrestling. The series premiered on January 16, 2015, airing on Friday evenings. This was the first time NJPW had been aired on an American television network since its formation in 1972. NJPW content would continue to air on AXS until December 2019.

On October 21, 2019, NJPW announced the formation of an American subsidiary called "New Japan Pro-Wrestling of America" (NJoA). On July 31, 2020, NJPW announced a new weekly series titled NJPW Strong, with its initial episodes to feature matches from the inaugural New Japan Cup USA tournament. As part of NJPW's expansion into the United States, the series would be produced by NJoA.

The premiere episode of Strong aired on August 7, 2020, on tape delay from the Oceanview Pavilion in Port Hueneme, California, and streaming on NJPW's service NJPW World. The event was held with no spectators due to the COVID-19 pandemic. On August 19, NJPW announced that Strong would be streaming on FITE TV in conjunction with NJPW World.

=== Change in format ===
On January 6, 2023, Hiroshi Tanahashi announced on his blog that the January Strong tapings would be the last, and that "overseas tournaments" would be held in a different format in the future.

On January 30, NJPW announced that all of the promotion's future American events would be branded under the NJPW Strong name, and be available for purchase via pay-per-view (PPV) providers. Beginning with Battle in the Valley on February 18, the NJoA PPVs began airing as NJPW Strong Live. These PPV events later aired on NJPW World in hour-long installments known as NJPW Strong on Demand.

== See also ==
- List of major NJPW events
- List of professional wrestling television series
- 2020 in professional wrestling
