= Lonestar Shootout 2023 =

2023 New Japan Pro-Wrestling event

Lonestar Shootout
- Promotional poster of the event
- Promotion: New Japan Pro-Wrestling
- Brand: NJPW Strong
- Date: November 10, 2023
- City: Garland, Texas
- Venue: Curtis Culwell Center
- Attendance: 1,027

Event chronology
← Previous; Power Struggle	Next → World Tag League; Wrestle Kingdom 18

Lonestar Shootout chronology
← Previous; 2022	Next → —

Lonestar Shootout (2023) was a professional wrestling event promoted by New Japan Pro-Wrestling (NJPW). It took place at the Curtis Culwell Center in Garland, Texas, on November 10, 2023.

== Production ==
=== Background ===
On January 30, 2023, NJPW announced that all of the promotion's future American events would be branded under the NJPW Strong name and be available for purchase via pay-per-view (PPV) providers. Beginning with Battle in the Valley on February 18, the NJoA PPVs began airing as NJPW Strong Live, with Strong ceasing to be its own show with exclusive content. These PPV events will later air on NJPW World in hour-long installments known as NJPW Strong on Demand.

=== Storylines ===
Lonestar Shootout featured professional wrestling matches that involved different wrestlers from pre-existing scripted feuds and storylines. Wrestlers portray villains, heroes, or less distinguishable characters in the scripted events that build tension and culminate in a wrestling match or series of matches.

On October 28, 2023 at Fighting Spirit Unleashed, after Shingo Takagi defeated Tama Tonga to win the NEVER Openweight Championship, Takagi called out anyone to challenge him for the title. Trent Beretta then appeared in the titantron and accepted Takagi's challenge. The match was then made official for Lonestar Shootout.

At Fighting Spirit Unleashed, Satoshi Kojima won a fatal four-way match by pinning Jeff Cobb to determine the #1 contender to Eddie Kingston's Strong Openweight Championship. The match was then made official for Lonestar Shootout.

After Stephanie Vaquer and Zeuxis defeated Lluvia and Johnnie Robbie, Vaquer challenged Mayu Iwatani for the IWGP Women's Championship.

After successfully defending the Strong Openweight Tag Team Championship, Hikuleo and El Phantasmo were attacked by West Coast Wrecking Crew (Jorel Nelson and Royce Isaacs). Nelson and Isaacs then challenged Hikuleo and El Phantasmo for the titles, which they accepted.

On October 28 2023, a vignette aired featured a mysterious man playing darts and setting his target on Toru Yano. The mystery man was then revealed as Joey Janela, with him facing Yano at Lonestar Shootout.

On October 30 2023, on his Twitter page, Mike Bailey challenged Zack Sabre Jr. for the NJPW World Television Championship. Later that night, NJPW then officially announced he match.

== Results ==
No.	Results	Stipulations	Times
1^{P}	Matt Vandagriff defeated Barrett Brown by pinfall	Strong Survivor match	6:00
2^{P}	Fred Rosser defeated Tom Lawlor by pinfall	Singles match	13:00
3	Tiger Mask, Atlantis and Máscara Dorada defeated Hechicero, Rocky Romero and Último Guerrero by pinfall	Six-man tag team match	13:40
4	Toru Yano defeated Joey Janela by pinfall	Singles match	9:30
5	Bullet Club War Dogs (Alex Coughlin, Chase Owens, Gabe Kidd and Clark Connors) defeated Intergalactic Jet Setters (Kevin Knight and Kushida) and Guerrillas of Destiny (Tama Tonga and Tanga Loa) by pinfall	Eight-man tag team match	10:50
6	Guerrillas of Destiny (Hikuleo and El Phantasmo) (c) defeated West Coast Wrecking Crew (Royce Isaacs and Jorel Nelson) by pinfall	Tag team match for the Strong Openweight Tag Team Championship	12:00
7	Místico defeated TJP by submission	Singles match	11:45
8	Eddie Kingston (c) defeated Satoshi Kojima by pinfall	Singles match for the Strong Openweight Championship	10:40
9	The Blackpool Combat Club (Wheeler Yuta and Jon Moxley) defeated Bullet Club (Kenta and David Finlay) by pinfall	Tag team match	12:50
10	Zack Sabre Jr. (c) defeated Mike Bailey by submission	Singles match for the NJPW World Television Championship	14:55
11	Mayu Iwatani (c) defeated Stephanie Vaquer by pinfall	Singles match for the IWGP Women's Championship	11:30
12	Shingo Takagi (c) defeated Trent Beretta by pinfall	Singles match for the NEVER Openweight Championship	25:45
(c) / – the champion(s) heading into the match; P / – the match was broadcast on the pre-show
