= Windy City Riot (2025) =

2025 professional wrestling event

- Promotional poster of the event
- Promotion: New Japan Pro-Wrestling
- Date: April 11, 2025
- City: Chicago, Illinois
- Venue: Wintrust Arena
- Attendance: 4,674

Event chronology
← Previous; Sakura Genesis	Next → Wrestling Dontaku

Windy City Riot chronology
← Previous; 2024	Next → —

Windy City Riot was a professional wrestling event promoted by New Japan Pro-Wrestling (NJPW). The event took place on April 11, 2025, at Wintrust Arena in Chicago, Illinois. It was the third event under the Windy City Riot chronology.

== Production ==
=== Background ===
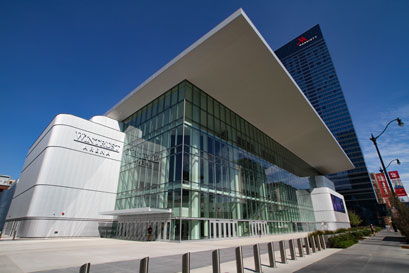
The event was held at the Wintrust Arena in Chicago, Illinois.

In October 2019, NJPW announced their expansion into the United States with their new American division, New Japan Pro-Wrestling of America (NJoA). On July 31, 2020, NJPW announced a new weekly series titled NJPW Strong; the series would be produced by NJoA. On January 30, 2023, NJPW announced that all of the promotion's future American events would be branded under the "Strong" name. NJoA PPVs have since aired under the NJPW Strong Live banner, and are later shown as part of the NJPW Strong on Demand series.

On January 5, 2025, during Wrestle Dynasty, NJPW announced that third Windy City Riot will take place on April 12, at the Wintrust Arena in Chicago, Illinois.

== Results ==
No.	Results	Stipulations	Times
1^{P}	Zane Jay defeated CJ Tino	STRONG Survivor match	8:57
2	TJP defeated Tom Lawlor	Singles match	12:13
3	Mina Shirakawa vs. AZM ended in a double countout	Singles match to determine the #1 contender for the Strong Women's Championship	11:43
4	World Class Wrecking Crew (Royce Isaacs and Jorel Nelson) (c) defeated Intergalactic Jet Setters (Kevin Knight and Kushida)	Tag team match for the Strong Openweight Tag Team Championship	11:05
5	Tomohiro Ishii defeated Gabe Kidd (c) 2–1 with sudden death overtime	30-minute Iron man match for the Strong Openweight Championship	34:05
6	Los Ingobernables de Japon (Tetsuya Naito and Titán) defeated El Phantasmo and Rocky Romero	Tag team match	11:04
7	Zack Sabre Jr. defeated David Finlay	Singles match	15:20
8	Hirooki Goto (c) defeated Shota Umino	Singles match for the IWGP World Heavyweight Championship	20:00
9	Konosuke Takeshita defeated Hiroshi Tanahashi	Singles match This was Tanahashi's final match in the United States.	20:37
(c) / – the champion(s) heading into the match; P / – the match was broadcast on the pre-show

=== Iron Man match ===
Score		Point winner	Decision	Notes	Time
Kidd	Ishii	Point winner	Decision	Notes	Time
1	0	Gabe Kidd	Pinfall	Kidd pinned Ishii after the Madman Bomb	22:50
1	1	Tomohiro Ishii	Submission	Ishii made Kidd submit to a cross armbreaker	27:56
1	2	Tomohiro Ishii	Pinfall	Ishii pinned Kidd after a brainbuster	34:05
