= Team Filthy =

Professional wrestling stable

- Logo of Team Filthy

Stable
- Members: See below
- Name: Team Filthy
- Debut: October 5, 2017
- Disbanded: April 12, 2024
- Years active: 2017–2024

Team Filthy was a professional wrestling stable that performed in New Japan Pro-Wrestling (NJPW), Major League Wrestling (MLW) and on the independent circuit. The group was formed on October 5, 2017, during MLW's One Shot event by Tom Lawlor.

== History ==
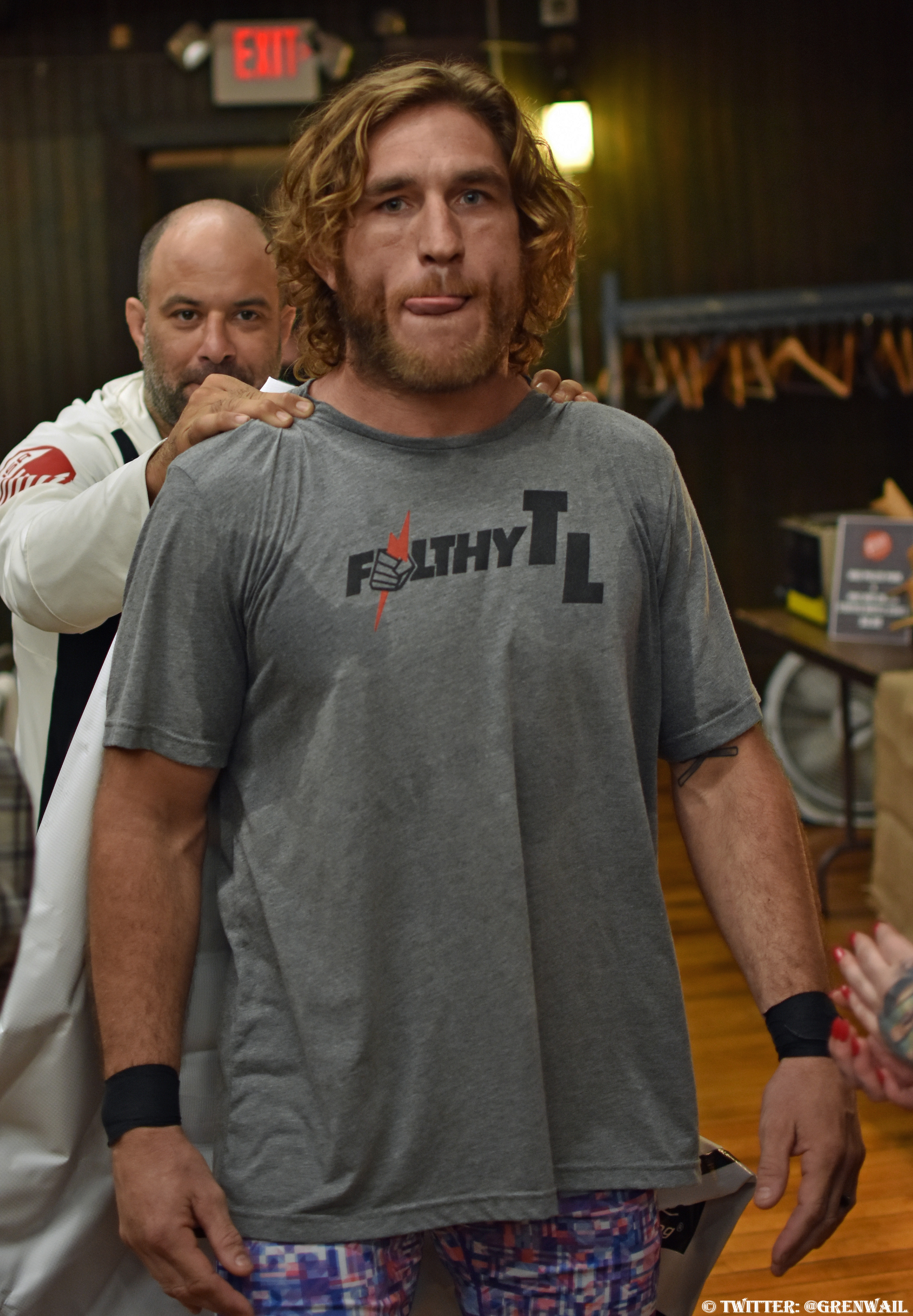
Tom Lawlor

=== Major League Wrestling (2017–2021) ===
Before his match with Jeff Cobb during MLW's One Shot event, Lawlor came to the ring with two unnamed figures dressed in the same tracksuit as him. These cornermen aided Lawlor in his victory and would interfere in Lawlor's other matches on his behalf. Lawlor would add Seth Petruzelli and Simon Gotch to his group, formally being named Team Filthy.

The group would come into conflict with rival heel stables, Promociones Dorado, and the Stud Stable for opportunities at the World Heavyweight Championship and dominant control of the company. Around this time, Fred Yehi was recruited into Team Filthy by Lawlor and Gotch after they saved him from a confrontation with the Stud Stable. Petruzelli would be attacked by the Stud Stable's Dirty Blondes and would eventually be quietly removed from Team Filthy and written off MLW television. After Lawlor defeated Shane Strickland for the honorary title of being "The Ace of MLW", he challenged the champion Low Ki, for a World Heavyweight Championship title match at the 2019 SuperFight, turning into a fan favorite. As Yehi had temporarily left MLW to do an excursion to several European promotions, specifically in Germany, Lawlor feuded with Sami Callihan who was hired by Promociones Dorado to attack Lawlor ahead of his match with Low Ki. Lawlor defeated Callihan in a Chicago Street Fight but was betrayed by Gotch who had led Lawlor into an ambush by Promociones Dorado after the match. It was revealed that Gotch too was paid off by Promociones Dorado's founder and promoter Salina de la Renta.

As the feud between Lawlor and Low Ki heated up, Promociones Dorado attacked a recently returned Fred Yehi and new Team Filthy member, Ariel Dominguez. Lawlor would avenge his betrayal at the hands of Gotch, defeating him in a No Holds Bard Match. After the match, Lawlor reiterated his challenge to Low Ki for the MLW Championship. Fred Yehi would leave MLW and be quietly removed from Team Filthy, Sometime after his match with Ricky Martinez. Lawlor would finally defeat Low Ki for the MLW World Heavyweight Championship. While Team Filthy would still exist at this point, Lawlor would spend the first half of 2019 defending the MLW Championship and feuding with Gotch's new stable, Contra Unit. Dominguez would be the only other active member of Team Filthy until he left MLW after his match with Dominic Garrini.

Lawlor would go on to lose the MLW Championship to Contra's Jacob Fatu at Kings of Colosseum. Aligning himself with Low Ki and Marshall and Ross Von Erich, Lawlor would defeat Contra at War Chamber. Lawlor became irate at the Von Erichs feeling that the attention they received superseded his feud with Contra and his opportunity to regain the MLW Championship. In November 2019, Lawlor reverted into a villain, attacking Marshall and Ross, costing the latter his World title match with Jacob Fatu. With Lawler's true colors exposed, his feud with the Von Erichs began. He also stated that he was thinking about reforming the dormant Team Filthy.

On the first MLW Fusion episode of 2020, Lawlor challenged the "Greatest Von Erich", Rip Von Erich, to a match. Allegedly the son of the "late" Lance Von Erich (himself only a Von Erich in kayfabe and was still alive during that episode's airing), Rip Von Erich was defeated by Lawlor in a squash match meant to provoke Ross and Marshall. As they entered the ring, Ross and Marshall were attacked from behind by Kenny Doane and Mike Mondo of the Spirit Squad with Lawlor and a Team Filthy cornerman joining in on the assault. Renaming Doane and Mondo the Filthy Squad, Lawlor formerly acknowledged that Team Filthy was not only back, but the pair were accepted into the group as the Filthy Squad. Doane and Mondo fell in a losing effort to the Von Erichs. Afterwards, the Filthy Squad were not seen again on MLW, with Rich Bocchini speculating that they were just Lawlor's patsies used to attack the Von Erichs.

One week later, Lawlor would recruit Dominic Garrini and Erick Stevens into Team Filthy, brutalizing the Von Erichs. On MLW's 100th episode, it was formally revealed that Rip Von Erich is Kit Osbourne and is Team Filthy's cornerman. Soon, Davey Boy Smith Jr. and Killer Kross were drawn into the feud between Team Filthy and Von Erichs. Smith challenged Lawlor, Garrini, Stevens, and Osbourne to an 8-Man Tag Match. Team Filthy would lose the match with Osbourne being put through a table by Smith. From there the battle between the remaining members of Team Filthy and their opponents would devolve into a chaotic brawl with King Mo attacking Kross with a baseball bat. Team Filthy revealed that King Mo and his manager, American Top Team Founder, Dan Lambert, became members of the group.

Due to the real-world effects of the COVID-19 pandemic, MLW stopped running shows for eight months. As revealed in the Pulp FUSION shorts in the interim, Team Filthy continued to cut promos on and plot against their enemies. Osbourne would disappear from MLW and Team Filthy during Pulp FUSION. Once MLW Fusion returned to air, Erick Stevens had retired from professional wrestling. In his place, Garrini recruited Kevin Ku, who had been signed by MLW, into Team Filthy. Lawlor and Stevens agreed with Stevens (in kayfabe) sponsoring Ku with his Kookies and Kream Sarasota business because it was a tax write off. Garrini and Ku re-formed their tag team from the independent circuit, Violence is Forever.

Lawlor maintained his position in the main event scene after winning the Opera Cup while Violence is Forever is putting its focus on winning the MLW World Tag Team Championships. Lawlor would continue his rivalry with the Von Erichs as he and Violence is Forever would attack them after their match with Fatu and Gotch. Placed as the special guest referee by Salina de la Renta during her produced MLW episode, Lawlor, along with L.A. Park Jr., willingly cheated Ross and Marshall out of the MLW Tag Team Championships in favor of Los Parks (L.A. Park and El Hijo de L.A. Park). Team Filthy would also attack ACH prior to his MLW World Heavyweight Championship with Jacob Fatu. Lawlor, who beat him clean in the Opera Cup, did not want Team Filthy playing second fiddle to him.

Team Filthy would receive some comeuppance on Lawlor's low quality Filthy Island special. A returning King Mo, after nearly a year questioning Low Ki's mental faculties and boasting about his tainted win against him, was beaten by Low Ki in the main event in under a minute. As Lambert cried fowl on commentary, Team Filthy attacked Low Ki only for the Von Erichs to arrive and help him to fight off Lawlor, Ku and Garrini. Afterwards, Mo and Lambert's association with Team Filthy would progressively dissolve until after the first MLW Open Draft where King Mo was officially represented under American Top Team. Osbourne would briefly return to Team Filthy after being announced during this draft. Team Filthy continued to feud with the Von Erichs and ACH until a losing effort against the Von Erichs on the first episode MLW Fusion: ALPHA.

Over the course of 2021, Lawlor acquired only one singles win and members of Team Filthy would slowly disappear from the show. Team Filthy ended when Kevin Ku quit the stable ahead of Lawlor's losing effort against King Muertes in a MLW Caribbean Heavyweight Championship Casket Match on episode 7 of Fusion: ALPHA.

As a member of 5150, Danny Limelight would wear a Team Filthy t-shirt, showing his allegiance to the stable in NJPW.

=== New Japan Pro-Wrestling (2020–2024) ===
Making his New Japan debut at Lion's Break Collision, Lawlor was spotted on NJPW Strong by Kevin Kelly watching the match between Jeff Cobb and Rocky Romero vs. J. R. Kratos and Rust Taylor. Before Lawlor's match with Fred Rosser, it was confirmed that he aligned himself with Kratos and Taylor to form the New Japan version of Team Filthy. Just one week after their formation, Danny Limelight would turn on Romero and join Team Filthy. Together, Team Filthy was victorious against Cobb, Romero, Rosser, and PJ Black in an eight-man tag team match. The next time Team Filthy appeared however, they were defeated by their four opponents in three separate matches. It was Taylor's "white belt performance" against Cobb, however, that caused Lawlor to fire him from the group. Wasting no time, Lawlor recruited Chris Dickinson in his place.

Eventually, cracks in Team Filthy started to form. On Night 2 of Strong Style Evolved 2021 Limelight would complain about not getting a qualifying match for the 2021 New Japan Cup USA tournament. Limelight also would insult Kratos and bring up his qualifying loss to Fred Rosser. Lawlor implied that Limelight missed his opportunity while he was wrestling for All Elite Wrestling and bring up Dickinson's New Beginning USA loss to Ren Narita. Dickinson was incensed by Lawlor's comments and Kratos was tired of Limelight talking too much. After the ROH 19th Anniversary Show, Dickinson aligned himself with Brody King, something Kratos and possibly Lawlor was not aware of.

During the Road to New Japan Cup USA 2021, Dickinson refused to break Sterling Riegel's arm on Lawlor's order, which a briefly hesitant Kratos did. On April 23, 2021, Lawlor defeated Brody King to become the winner of the 2021 New Japan Cup USA tournament and the inaugural Strong Openweight Champion. As Lawlor immediately demand his first challenger, Dickinson surprised Lawlor and Kratos and accepted Lawlor's challenge. Dickinson secured a Team Filthy victory against King, Karl Fredericks, TJP, and Clark Connors but was betrayed by Team Filthy after the match. Limelight, speaking on behalf of the group, said that Dickinson bit the hand that fed him with his recent actions. For his part, Dickinson didn't want to a part of Team Filthy anymore because of their ruthless actions.

In the first week of Strong's version of the Summer Struggle event, Limelight and Kratos defeated the West Coast Wrecking Crew, Royce Isaacs and Jorel Nelson. After the match, Lawlor approached the tag team, impressed with what he saw. Lawlor looking to strengthen Team Filthy, invited them to join, which Isaacs and Nelson accepted. The rest of 2021 saw Team Filthy continue their feuds with Rosser, Romero, and the ousted Dickinson alongside his VLNCE UNLTD stablemate in ROH, Brody King. The stable would also take aim at Alex Coughlin due to opposing the stable as a member of New Japan's LA Dojo. Coughlin and Kratos also had a rival stemming back to a match between them at Josh Barnett's Bloodsport 4.

As Lawlor continued his reign as Strong Openweight Champion, he grew tired of dealing with Rocky Romero's medaling. On the final week of Showdown 2021, Lawlor bring in Black Tiger as a hired gun to take care of Romero. This version of Black Tiger was Romero's former Havana Pitbulls tag team partner, Ricky Reyes, though while Romero heavily implied that he knew the truth, Tiger's identity was never stated.

As these feuds continued into 2022, Nelson, and Isaacs made it their purpose to be the foundation of the tag team division in NJPW Strong. In June, the West Coast Wrecking Crew would take place in the tournament for the inaugural Strong Openweight Tag Team Champions and, after being knocked out in the first round by TMDK, would have several other matches for the titles during the rest of the year. Despite still actively feuding with Romero, Black Tiger would make his last appearance with New Japan Pro Wrestling after being pinned by Rosser at Windy City Riot. At Collision in Philadelphia, Lawlor would lose the Strong Openweight Championship in a title match where Rosser's position in NJPW Strong was also on the line.

In July, Tom Lawlor and Royce Isaacs participated in G1 Climax 32, making Lawlor tournament debut. In addition feuding with TMDK in tag team matches with Isaacs, Lawlor went 3–3 in the G1 Climax gaining 6 points. These victories were against Toru Yano, Bad Luck Fale, and Jeff Cobb. After the G1, Team Filthy would add Homicide to their list of enemies. After Homicide defeated Limelight at Detonation 2022, he was attacked by Bobby Fish. Established as Lawlor's friend and wrestling trainer, Fish would be official brought into the rank of Team Filthy.

At Battle in the Valley 2023, Lawlor would be victorious in his Filthy Rules Fight against Homicide. However, on the same night, Kratos was defeated by Coughlin, Neson and Isaacs were defeated by The Motor City Machine Guns for the Strong Openweight Tag Titles and Fish was defeated by David Finlay. With his defeat, Fish disappears from Team Filthy and NJPW. The group became constant fixtures on the rebooted, monthly NJPW Strong Live in the United States, as well as appearing for NJPW and Impact Wrestling's Multiverse United pay-per-view, and episodes of All Elite Wrestling and Ring of Honor. Lawlor, Kratos, Isaacs, and Nelson would also take part in NJPW Independence Day events at Korakuen Hall.

Team Filthy started to feel frustrated with lack of opportunities and touring in New Japan. After Lonestar Shootout, a frustrated West Coast Wrecking Crew, fresh off their Strong Openweight Tag Title loss to El Phantasmo and Hikuleo, confronted Lawlor. They took issue with Lawlor's loss to rival, Fred Rosser, and that he shook his hand afterwards. When Team Filthy lost at the 2024 Battle in the Valley against Rosser, Shota Umino, and Jacob Fatu, Nelson and Isaacs were incensed that Lawlor once again shook Rosser's hand after the match. They left Lawlor to "Figure it out" and decide to be with them or Fred Rosser.

At Windy City Riot on April 12, 2024, Nelson and Isaacs and Rosser and Lawlor participated in a four corners tag team for the Strong Openweight Tag Team Championship, which they lost. After the match, Nelson and Isaacs attacked Rosser and Lawlor, cut part of Lawlor's hair and fed it to Rosser, thus disbanding Team Filthy.

=== Independent circuit (2020–2024) ===
In mid-2020, Team Filthy members, Tom Lawlor, Erick Stevens and Kevin Ku made sporadic appearances in Paradigm Pro Wrestling while Dominic Garrini made steady appearances. Stevens would have his last wrestling match at the PPW Trapsoul event. At the 2021 PPW UWFi Rules Contenders Series, Lawlor and Garrini would once again re-form Team Filthy within the promotion. In the first episode of UFWi Series, Lawlor inducted Matt Makowski into Team Filthy. This version of the group would remain together until late 2021.

Starting in 2022, Lawlor and the West Coast Wrecking Crew have made several appearances in Future Stars Of Wrestling (with Danny Limelight), Prestige Wrestling, and West Coast Pro Wrestling as members of Team Filthy. In 2023, they started wrestling for Deadlock Pro-Wrestling. During the DPW 2nd Anniversary show, Lawlor and the West Coast Wrecking Crew were on the losing end of a match against LaBron Kozone and former Team Filthy members, Violence Is Forever. As they attacked their opponent's post-match, MXM (Mason D. Madden and Mansoor) made their DPW debut to stop the attack.

Lawlor challenged stablemate, Danny Limelight, for the UWN World Championship, which Limelight accepted. On the May 14 episode of Championship Wrestling, Limelight retained his championship.

== Members ==
Member	Tenure	Promotion(s)
Tom Lawlor (L)	October 5, 2017 – October 7, 2019; December 21, 2019 – April 12, 2024	Major League Wrestling; New Japan Pro-Wrestling; Independent circuit
Seth Petruzelli	December 15, 2017 – August 18, 2018	Major League Wrestling
Simon Gotch	January 31, 2018 – November 16, 2018	Major League Wrestling
Fred Yehi	July 21, 2018 – February 1, 2019	Major League Wrestling
Ariel Dominguez	December 15, 2018 – October 7, 2019	Major League Wrestling
Kenny Doane	January 4, 2020 – January 11, 2020	Major League Wrestling
Mike Mondo	January 4, 2020 – January 11, 2020	Major League Wrestling
Erick Stevens	February 22, 2020 – October 12, 2020	Major League Wrestling; Independent circuit
Rust Taylor	November 14, 2020 – December 18, 2020	New Japan Pro-Wrestling
Dominic Garrini	January 25, 2020 – April 28, 2021	Major League Wrestling; Independent circuit
Chris Dickinson	January 8, 2021– May 14, 2021	New Japan Pro-Wrestling; Ring of Honor
Dan Lambert	March 28, 2020 – May 27, 2021	Major League Wrestling
King Mo	March 28, 2020 – May 27, 2021	Major League Wrestling
Kit Osbourne	January 11, 2020 – August 13, 2020 July 1, 2021 – July 24, 2021	Major League Wrestling
Matt Makowski	March 24, 2021 – October 15, 2021	Independent circuit
Kevin Ku	September 3, 2020 – November 3, 2021	Major League Wrestling; Independent circuit
Black Tiger	November 27, 2021 – April 10, 2022	New Japan Pro-Wrestling
Bobby Fish	November 20, 2022 – February 18, 2023	New Japan Pro-Wrestling
J. R. Kratos	November 14, 2020 – July 4, 2023	New Japan Pro-Wrestling; National Wrestling Alliance
Danny Limelight	November 21, 2020 – October 28, 2023	New Japan Pro-Wrestling; Major League Wrestling; Independent circuit
Royce Isaacs	August 6, 2021 – April 12, 2024	New Japan Pro-Wrestling; Independent circuit
Jorel Nelson	August 6, 2021 – April 12, 2024	New Japan Pro-Wrestling; Independent circuit

== Sub-groups ==
=== Former ===
Affiliate	Members	Tenure	Type	Promotion(s)
Filthy Squad	Kenny Doane; Mike Mondo	2020	Tag team	MLW
West Coast Wrecking Crew	Jorel Nelson; Royce Isaacs	2021–2024	Tag team	NJPW; Independent circuit

== Championships and accomplishments ==
=== Professional wrestling ===
- Future Stars of Wrestling
  - FSW Tag Team Championship (3 times, current) - West Coast Wrecking Crew
  - FSW No Limits Championship (1 time) - Limelight
- Major League Wrestling
  - MLW World Heavyweight Championship (1 time) - Lawlor
  - Battle Riot (2018) - Lawlor
  - Opera Cup (2020) - Lawlor
- New Japan Pro-Wrestling
  - Strong Openweight Championship (1 time) - Lawlor
  - New Japan Cup USA (2021) - Lawlor
- Paradigm Pro Wrestling
  - PPW Heavy Hitters Championship (3 times) - Garrini (1), Makowski (1), and Lawlor (1)
- Prestige Wrestling
  - Prestige Championship (1 time) - Lawlor
- Pro Wrestling Illustrated
  - Ranked Lawlor No. 59 of the top 500 singles wrestlers in the PWI 500 in 2021
  - Ranked Dickinson No. 92 of the top 500 singles wrestlers in the PWI 500 in 2021
  - Ranked Kratos No. 124 of the top 500 singles wrestlers in the PWI 500 in 2021
  - Ranked Fish No. 200 of the top 500 singles wrestlers in the PWI 500 in 2022
  - Ranked Yehi No. 237 of the top 500 singles wrestlers in the PWI 500 in 2019
  - Ranked Makowski No. 279 of the top 500 singles wrestlers in the PWI 500 in 2021
  - Ranked Stevens No. 279 of the top 500 singles wrestlers in the PWI 500 in 2020
  - Ranked Garrini No. 310 of the top 500 singles wrestlers in the PWI 500 in 2021
  - Ranked Isaacs No. 315 of the top 500 singles wrestlers in the PWI 500 in 2022
  - Ranked Ku No. 333 of the top 500 singles wrestlers in the PWI 500 in 2021
  - Ranked Limelight No. 350 of the top 500 singles wrestlers in the PWI 500 in 2023
  - Ranked Gotch No. 372 of the top 500 singles wrestlers in the PWI 500 in 2018
- United Wrestling Network
  - UWN World Championship (1 time) - Limelight
