= Windy City Riot (2024) =

2024 New Japan Pro-Wrestling professional wrestling event

- Promotion: New Japan Pro-Wrestling
- Brand: NJPW Strong
- Date: April 12, 2024
- City: Chicago, Illinois
- Venue: Wintrust Arena
- Attendance: 6,028

Event chronology
← Previous; Sakura Genesis	Next → Wrestling World in Taiwan; Satsuma no Kuni; Wrestling Dontaku 2024

Windy City Riot chronology
← Previous; 2022	Next → 2025

Windy City Riot (2024) was a professional wrestling event produced by New Japan Pro-Wrestling (NJPW). The event took place on April 12, 2024, at the Wintrust Arena in Chicago, Illinois. It was the second event under the Windy City Riot chronology.

Eleven matches were contested at the event, including two on the pre-show. In the main event, Jon Moxley defeated Tetsuya Naito to win the IWGP World Heavyweight Championship. In other prominent matches, Nic Nemeth defeated Tomohiro Ishii, Zack Sabre Jr. defeated Matt Riddle to win the NJPW World Television Championship, Bullet Club (David Finlay, Kenta, Clark Connors and Gabe Kidd) defeated Eddie Kingston, Homicide and United Empire (Jeff Cobb and TJP) in a Riot Rules match and Stephanie Vaquer defeated AZM to retain the Strong Women's Championship.

== Production ==
=== Background ===
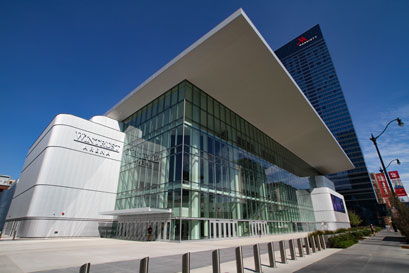
The event was held at the Wintrust Arena in Chicago, Illinois.

In October 2019, NJPW announced their expansion into the United States with their new American division, New Japan Pro-Wrestling of America (NJoA). On July 31, 2020, NJPW announced a new weekly series titled NJPW Strong; the series would be produced by NJoA. On January 30, 2023, NJPW announced that all of the promotion's future American events would be branded under the "Strong" name. NJoA PPVs have since aired under the NJPW Strong Live banner, and are later shown as part of the NJPW Strong on Demand series.

On January 5, 2024, during New Year Dash!!, NJPW announced that Windy City Riot will take place on April 12, at the Wintrust Arena in Chicago, Illinois. This is the second Windy City Riot event, with the first taking part in April 2022. It was later confirmed that NJPW would provide English commentary for the event.

=== Storylines ===
The event featured several professional wrestling matches, which involved different wrestlers from pre-existing scripted feuds, plots, and storylines. Wrestlers portrayed heroes, villains, or less distinguishable characters in scripted events that build tension and culminate in a wrestling match or series of matches. Storylines are produced on NJPW's events.

On January 13, during Battle in the Valley, Mustafa Ali issued a challenge to Hiromu Takahashi at Windy City Riot, which would mark Ali's NJPW debut.

At Battle in the Valley, after Jon Moxley defeated Shingo Takagi in a No Disqualification match, Moxley challenged the IWGP World Heavyweight Champion Tetsuya Naito for a match at Windy City Riot. On February 22, Naito stated that he would put the IWGP World Heavyweight Championship on the line at Windy City Riot; if he successfully defends the title at Sakura Genesis against Yota Tsuji, which he did.

Also at Battle in the Valley, Eddie Kingston and Gabe Kidd competed in a match that ended in a double countout, where Kingston defended his Strong Openweight, ROH World, and the AEW Continental Championships. As a result, NJPW later announced that Kidd and Kingston would serve as captains in an eight-man Riot Rules tag team match.

== Results ==
No.	Results	Stipulations	Times
1^{P}	Matt Vandagriff defeated Zane Jay by pinfall	Singles match	3:33
2^{P}	Trish Adora and Alex Windsor defeated Mina Shirakawa and Viva Van by pinfall	Tag team match	7:03
3	Ren Narita defeated Minoru Suzuki by pinfall	Singles match	7:43
4	Stephanie Vaquer (c) defeated AZM by pinfall	Singles match for the Strong Women's Championship	10:50
5	TMDK (Shane Haste and Mikey Nicholls) defeated Fred Rosser and Tom Lawlor, West Coast Wrecking Crew (Royce Isaacs and Jorel Nelson) and Guerrillas of Destiny (El Phantasmo and Hikuleo) (c) by pinfall	Four corners tag team match for the Strong Openweight Tag Team Championship	9:56
6	Shota Umino defeated Jack Perry by pinfall	Singles match	15:04
7	Mustafa Ali defeated Hiromu Takahashi by pinfall	Singles match	15:08
8	Bullet Club (David Finlay, Kenta, Clark Connors and Gabe Kidd) defeated Eddie Kingston, Homicide, and United Empire (Jeff Cobb and TJP) by pinfall	Riot Rules match	17:58
9	Zack Sabre Jr. defeated Matt Riddle (c) by pinfall	Singles match for the NJPW World Television Championship	13:15
10	Nic Nemeth defeated Tomohiro Ishii by pinfall	Singles match	14:07
11	Jon Moxley defeated Tetsuya Naito (c) by pinfall	Singles match for the IWGP World Heavyweight Championship	20:21
(c) / – the champion(s) heading into the match; P / – the match was broadcast on the pre-show
