= List of NJPW Strong special episodes =

This is a list of NJPW Strong special episodes, detailing all professional wrestling television special cards promoted by New Japan Pro-Wrestling of America (NJPWoA). The episodes are branded, usually 3–4 weeks at a time, to mimic the normal touring schedule of the main promotion. Prior to September 2021, other episodes before these events were mainly branded as "Road to" shows.

== Special episodes ==
Episode	Dates	Location	Cards
New Japan Cup USA	August 7–21, 2020	Port Hueneme, California	Round 1 (August 7): No. / Results / Stipulations / Times; 1 / Kenta defeated Karl Fredericks / Singles match, 2020 New Japan Cup USA round 1 / 9:59; 2 / Jeff Cobb defeated Tanga Loa / Singles match, 2020 New Japan Cup USA round 1 / 8:45; 3 / David Finlay defeated Chase Owens / Singles match, 2020 New Japan Cup USA round 1 / 9:46; 4 / Tama Tonga defeated Brody King / Singles match, 2020 New Japan Cup USA round 1 / 7:14; Semi-finals (August 14): No. / Results / Stipulations / Times; 1 / Barrett Brown and Logan Riegel defeated Clark Connors and Jordan Clearwater / Tag team match / 7:03; 2 / Blake Christian, Misterioso and P. J. Black defeated A. C. H., Alex Zayne and TJP / Six-man tag team match / 7:55; 3 / David Finlay defeated Tama Tonga / Singles match, 2020 New Japan Cup USA semi-final / 7:10; 4 / Kenta defeated Jeff Cobb / Singles match, 2020 New Japan Cup USA semi-final / 14:38; Final (August 21): No. / Results / Stipulations / Times; 1 / Rocky Romero and Adrian Quest defeated Danny Limelight and The DKC / Tag team match / 9:57; 2 / Villain Enterprises (Flip Gordon and Brody King) defeated Bullet Club (Chase Owens and Jay White) / Tag team match / 8:44; 3 / Kenta defeated David Finlay / Singles match, 2020 New Japan Cup USA final / 13:35
Fighting Spirit Unleashed	September 4–11, 2020	Port Hueneme, California	(see results section)
Lion's Break Crown	September 25–October 9, 2020	Port Hueneme, California	Round 1 (September 25): No. / Results / Stipulations / Times; 1 / Logan Riegel defeated The DKC / Singles match, Lion's Break Crown Round 1 / 6:31; 2 / Clark Connors defeated Jordan Clearwater by submission / Singles match, Lion's Break Crown Round 1 / 6:11; 3 / Danny Limelight defeated Barrett Brown / Singles match, Lion's Break Crown Round 1 / 9:31; 4 / Blake Christian defeated Adrian Quest / Singles match, Lion's Break Crown Round 1 / 6:49; Semi-finals (October 2): No. / Results / Stipulations / Times; 1 / Clark Connors defeated Logan Riegel by submission / Singles match, Lion's Break Crown Semi-Final / 7:51; 2 / Danny Limelight defeated Blake Christian / Singles match, Lion's Break Crown Semi-Final / 7:54; 3 / Villain Enterprises (Flip Gordon and Brody King) defeated Karl Fredericks and TJP / Tag team match / 11:06; 4 / Bullet Club (Jay White, Kenta, Chase Owens, and Hikuleo) defeated David Finlay, Misterioso, Rocky Romero, and Jeff Cobb / Eight-man tag team match / 11:28; Finals (October 9): No. / Results / Stipulations / Times; 1 / Blake Christian, Logan Riegel, and Misterioso defeated Barrett Brown, Adrian Quest, and Fred Rosser / Six-man tag team match / 10:30; 2 / Clark Connors defeated Danny Limelight by submission / Singles match, Lion's Break Crown Final / 12:36; 3 / Karl Fredericks, A. C. H., TJP, Rocky Romero, Jeff Cobb, and David Finlay defeated Bullet Club (Hikuleo, Chase Owens, Tanga Loa, Tama Tonga, Kenta, and Jay White) / Twelve-man elimination tag team match / 16:00
NEVER	October 16–23, 2020	Port Hueneme, California	Week 1 (October 16): No. / Results / Stipulations / Times; 1 / Misterioso defeated Danny Limelight / Singles match / 6:10; 2 / Hikuleo defeated TJP / Singles match / 8:24; 3 / P. J. Black defeated Alex Zayne / Singles match / 7:39; 4 / Jeff Cobb and David Finlay defeated Bullet Club (Chase Owens and Kenta) / Tag team match / 9:44; Week 2 (October 23): No. / Results / Stipulations / Times; 1 / Fred Rosser defeated Clark Connors / Singles match / 6:00; 2 / Karl Fredericks defeated A. C. H. / Singles match / 6:22; 3 / Villain Enterprises (Brody King and Flip Gordon) defeated G.O.D. (Tama Tonga and Tanga Loa) / Tag team match / 7:39; 4 / Jay White defeated Rocky Romero / Singles match / 7:39
New Japan Showdown	November 13–20, 2020	Port Hueneme, California	Week 1 (November 13): No. / Results / Stipulations / Times; 1 / Adrian Quest and Alex Zayne defeated Blake Christian and A. C. H. / Tag team match / 7:12; 2 / Tom Lawlor defeated Fred Rosser by referee stoppage / Singles match / 11:13; 3 / Karl Fredericks, Brody King, and Juice Robinson defeated Bullet Club (Chase Owens, Tanga Loa, and Jay White) / Six man tag team match / 9:51; 4 / Tama Tonga defeated P. J. Black / Singles match / 10:38; Week 2 (November 20): No. / Results / Stipulations / Times; 1 / The DKC and Clark Connors defeated The Riegel Twins (Logan Riegel and Sterling Riegel) by submission / Tag team match / 9:06; 2 / Rust Taylor defeated Rocky Romero by submission / Singles match / 10:00; 3 / Jeff Cobb defeated J. R. Kratos / Singles match / 7:38; 4 / Kenta defeated David Finlay / Singles match for the IWGP United States Heavyweight Championship challenge rights certificate / 14:11
Detonation	December 11–18, 2020	Port Hueneme, California	Week 1 (December 11): No. / Results / Stipulations / Times; 1 / The DKC and Clark Connors defeated The Riegel Twins (Logan Riegel and Sterling Riegel) / Tag team match / 5:11; 2 / Bullet Club (Hikuleo, Chase Owens, and Tanga Loa) defeated Misterioso, David Finlay, and Juice Robinson / Six man tag team match / 6:25; 3 / Tama Tonga defeated A. C. H. / Singles match / 11:12; 4 / Jay White defeated Karl Fredericks / Singles match / 11:06; Week 2 (December 18): No. / Results / Stipulations / Times; 1 / Rocky Romero defeated Danny Limelight by submission / Singles match / 9:18; 2 / Jeff Cobb defeated Rust Taylor / Singles match / 8:07; 3 / P. J. Black and Fred Rosser defeated Team Filthy (J. R. Kratos and Tom Lawlor) / Tag team match / 8:09; 4 / Kenta defeated Brody King / Singles match for the IWGP United States Heavyweight Championship challenge rights certificate / 14:16
Lion's Break Contender	January 22–29, 2021	Port Hueneme, California	Week 1 (January 22): No. / Results / Stipulations / Times; 1 / The Riegel Twins (Logan Riegel and Sterling Riegel) defeated Kevin Knight and Jordan Clearwater / Tag team match / 6:12; 2 / Brody King defeated J. R. Kratos / Singles match / 10:09; 3 / Ren Narita defeated Bateman by submission / Singles match / 14:53; Week 2 (January 29): No. / Results / Stipulations / Times; 1 / Clark Connors defeated The DKC by submission / Singles match / 7:22; 2 / Chris Dickinson defeated Rocky Romero by submission / Singles match / 9:53; 3 / Lio Rush, TJP, and Fred Rosser defeated Bullet Club (El Phantasmo, Hikuleo, and Kenta) / Six man tag team match / 11:54
The New Beginning USA	February 19–26, 2021	Port Hueneme, California	Week 1 (February 19): No. / Results / Stipulations / Times; 1 / Rocky Romero, Misterioso and Adrian Quest defeated Rey Horus, Barrett Brown and The DKC by submission / Six man tag team match / 10:13; 2 / Fred Rosser defeated Hikuleo / Singles match / 10:40; 3 / El Phantasmo defeated Lio Rush / Singles match / 14:05; Week 2 (February 26): No. / Results / Stipulations / Times; 1 / Brody King, A. C. H., and The Riegel Twins (Logan Riegel and Sterling Riegel) defeated TJP, Clark Connors, The DKC, and Kevin Knight / Eight man tag team match / 8:26; 2 / Ren Narita defeated Chris Dickinson by submission / Singles match / 7:51; 3 / Jon Moxley (c) defeated Kenta / Singles match for the IWGP United States Heavyweight Championship / 14:25; (c) / – the champion(s) heading into the match
Strong Style Evolved	March 19–26, 2021	Port Hueneme, California	Week 1 (March 19): No. / Results / Stipulations / Times; 1 / Jeff Cobb defeated Alex Coughlin / Singles match / 5:58; 2 / Ren Narita defeated Misterioso by submission / Singles match, 2021 New Japan Cup USA qualifier / 11:12; 3 / Brody King defeated Bateman / Singles match, 2021 New Japan Cup USA qualifier / 13:25; Week 2 (March 26): No. / Results / Stipulations / Times; 1 / Clark Connors defeated TJP / Singles match, 2021 New Japan Cup USA qualifier / 9:27; 2 / Chris Dickinson defeated Blake Christian / Singles match, 2021 New Japan Cup USA qualifier / 8:53; 3 / David Finlay and Karl Fredericks defeated Team Filthy (Tom Lawlor and Danny Limelight) / Tag team match / 17:27
New Japan Cup USA (2021)	April 9–23, 2021	Port Hueneme, California	Round 1 (April 9): No. / Results / Stipulations / Times; 1 / Lio Rush defeated Clark Connors / Singles match, 2021 New Japan Cup USA round 1 / 9:57; 2 / Tom Lawlor defeated Ren Narita by submission / Singles match, 2021 New Japan Cup USA round 1 / 13:19; 3 / Hikuleo defeated Fred Rosser / Singles match, 2021 New Japan Cup USA round 1 / 6:22; 4 / Brody King defeated Chris Dickinson / Singles match, 2021 New Japan Cup USA round 1 / 10:42; Semi-finals (April 16): No. / Results / Stipulations / Times; 1 / Misterioso, Barrett Brown, Adrian Quest and Jordan Clearwater defeated Karl Fredericks, Kevin Knight, the DKC, and Alex Coughlin / Eight man tag team match / 10:37; 2 / Tom Lawlor defeated Hikuleo / Singles match, 2021 New Japan Cup USA semi-final / 8:58; 3 / Brody King defeated Lio Rush / Singles match, 2021 New Japan Cup USA semi-final / 7:38; Final (April 23): No. / Results / Stipulations / Times; 1 / Team Filthy (J. R. Kratos and Chris Dickinson) defeated Clark Connors and TJP / Tag team match / 11:06; 2 / Rocky Romero defeated Wheeler Yuta by submission / Singles match / 12:41; 3 / Tom Lawlor defeated Brody King by submission / Singles match, 2021 New Japan Cup USA final, for the Strong Openweight Championship / 20:05
LA Dojo Showcase	April 30, 2021	Port Hueneme, California	No. / Results / Stipulations / Times; 1 / TJP defeated The DKC by submission / Singles match / 7:39; 2 / Fred Rosser and Ren Narita defeated Alex Coughlin and Kevin Knight / Tag team match / 12:36; 3 / Karl Fredericks defeated Clark Connors / Singles match / 18:19
Collision	May 7, 2021; May 21–28, 2021	Port Hueneme, California	Week 1 (May 7): No. / Results / Stipulations / Times; 1 / Barrett Brown and Adrian Quest defeated Kevin Knight and The DKC / Tag team match / 8:32; 2 / West Coast Wrecking Crew (Jorel Nelson and Royce Isaacs) defeated Misterioso and Jordan Clearwater / Tag team match / 10:21; 3 / Jon Moxley and Chris Dickinson defeated Yuji Nagata and Ren Narita / Tag team match / 9:18; Week 2 (May 21): No. / Results / Stipulations / Times; 1 / Bateman defeated Alex Coughlin / Singles match / 9:43; 2 / Brody King and Karl Fredericks defeated Team Filthy (J. R. Kratos and Danny Limelight) / Tag team match / 8:02; 3 / Fred Rosser defeated Hikuleo / No Disqualification match / 15:32; Week 3 (May 28): No. / Results / Stipulations / Times; 1 / Clark Connors defeated AJZ / Singles match / 9:38; 2 / El Phantasmo defeated Wheeler Yuta / Singles match / 14:06; 3 / Tom Lawlor (c) defeated Chris Dickinson / Singles match for the Strong Openweight Championship / 21:16; (c) / – the champion(s) heading into the match
Ignition	June 18–25, 2021	Port Hueneme, California	Week 1 (June 18): No. / Results / Stipulations / Times; 1 / Josh Alexander defeated Alex Coughlin / Singles match / 11:25; 2 / Barrett Brown and Bateman defeated Fred Rosser and Adrian Quest / Tag team match / 9:41; 3 / Satoshi Kojima defeated J. R. Kratos / Singles match / 11:26; Week 2 (June 25): No. / Results / Stipulations / Times; 1 / Fred Yehi and Wheeler Yuta defeated The DKC and Kevin Knight / Tag team match / 7:47; 2 / Clark Connors defeated Rocky Romero / Singles match / 12:04; 3 / Tom Lawlor (c) defeated Karl Fredericks / Singles match for the Strong Openweight Championship / 18:04; (c) / – the champion(s) heading into the match
Fireworks Frenzy	July 2, 2021	Port Hueneme, California	No. / Results / Stipulations / Times; 1 / Lio Rush defeated Adrian Quest / Singles match / 8:19; 2 / Hikuleo defeated Jordan Clearwater / Singles match / 7:44; 3 / Fred Rosser defeated Bateman / Singles match / 15:34
Tag Team Turbulence	July 16–30, 2021	Port Hueneme, California	Round 1 (July 16): No. / Results / Stipulations / Times; 1 / The Good Brothers (Karl Anderson and Doc Gallows) defeated Clark Connors and TJP / Tag team match, Tag Team Turbulence tournament round 1 / 10:01; 2 / Yuji Nagata and Ren Narita defeated Fred Yehi and Wheeler Yuta / Tag team match, Tag Team Turbulence tournament round 1 / 7:22; 3 / West Coast Wrecking Crew (Jorel Nelson and Royce Isaacs) defeated The DKC and Kevin Knight / Tag team match, Tag Team Turbulence tournament round 1 / 10:59; 4 / Violence Unlimited (Brody King and Chris Dickinson) defeated Team Filthy (J. R. Kratos and Danny Limelight) / Tag team match, Tag Team Turbulence tournament round 1 / 8:22; Semi-finals (July 23): No. / Results / Stipulations / Times; 1 / Violence Unlimited (Brody King and Chris Dickinson) defeated West Coast Wrecking Crew (Jorel Nelson and Royce Isaacs) / Tag team match, Tag Team Turbulence tournament semi-final / 10:13; 2 / The Good Brothers (Karl Anderson and Doc Gallows) defeated Yuji Nagata and Ren Narita / Tag team match, Tag Team Turbulence tournament semi-final / 10:40; 3 / Tom Lawlor (c) defeated Satoshi Kojima by referee stoppage / Singles match for the Strong Openweight Championship / 16:40; (c) / – the champion(s) heading into the match Final (July 30): No. / Results / Stipulations / Times; 1 / Bateman defeated Kevin Knight / Singles match / 7:47; 2 / Adrian Quest, Fred Rosser, and Karl Fredericks defeated Misterioso and West Coast Wrecking Crew (Jorel Nelson and Royce Isaacs) / Six-man tag team match / 9:20; 3 / The Good Brothers (Karl Anderson and Doc Gallows) defeated Violence Unlimited (Brody King and Chris Dickinson) / Tag team match, Tag Team Turbulence tournament final / 10:59
Summer Struggle USA	August 20–27, 2021	Port Hueneme, California	Week 1 (August 20): No. / Results / Stipulations / Times; 1 / Matt Morris defeated Alex Coughlin / Singles match / 8:32; 2 / Ren Narita, Clark Connors, and TJP defeated Fred Rosser, Fred Yehi, and Daniel Garcia / Six-man tag team match / 12:59; 3 / West Coast Wrecking Crew (Royce Isaacs and Jorel Nelson) defeated Violence Unlimited (Brody King and Chris Dickinson) / Tag team match / 9:51; Week 2 (August 27): No. / Results / Stipulations / Times; 1 / Barrett Brown, Misterioso, and Bateman defeated The DKC, Adrian Quest, and Wheeler Yuta / Six-man tag team match / 9:26; 2 / Karl Fredericks defeated Alexander James / Singles match / 9:37; 3 / Violence Unlimited (Brody King and Chris Dickinson), Lio Rush, and Juice Robinson defeated Team Filthy (West Coast Wrecking Crew (Royce Isaacs and Jorel Nelson), J. R. Kratos, and Tom Lawlor) by submission / Eight-man tag team match / 14:24
BBQ Brawl	September 3, 2021	Port Hueneme, California	No. / Results / Stipulations / Times; 1 / Josh Alexander defeated Daniel Garcia / Singles match / 10:38; 2 / TJP defeated Rey Horus / Singles match / 11:06; 3 / Hikuleo defeated Matt Morris / Singles match / 9:44
LA Dojo Showcase 2	September 10, 2021	Port Hueneme, California	No. / Results / Stipulations / Times; 1 / Kevin Knight defeated The DKC by submission / Singles match / 9:51; 2 / Clark Connors defeated Alex Coughlin / Singles match / 10:44; 3 / Ren Narita defeated Karl Fredericks / Singles match / 12:38
Fighting Spirit Unleashed (2021)	September 18–October 2, 2021	Long Beach, California	Week 1 (September 18): No. / Results / Stipulations / Times; 1 / Tomohiro Ishii defeated Alex Coughlin / Singles match / 9:13; 2 / Karl Fredericks, Clark Connors, and Hiroshi Tanahashi defeated Stray Dog Army (Barrett Brown, Bateman, and Misterioso) / Six-man tag team match / 13:33; 3 / Hikuleo defeated Juice Robinson / Tables match / 9:57; Week 2 (September 25): No. / Results / Stipulations / Times; 1 / Yuji Nagata and Yuya Uemura defeated Kevin Knight and The DKC by submission / Tag team match / 9:27; 2 / Jay White defeated Wheeler Yuta / Singles match / 11:29; 3 / Ren Narita defeated Fred Rosser / Singles match / 15:11; Week 3 (October 2): No. / Results / Stipulations / Times; 1 / J. R. Kratos defeated Fred Yehi / Singles match / 9:13; 2 / Chris Dickinson defeated Royce Isaacs by submission / Singles match / 11:08; 3 / Tom Lawlor (c) defeated Lio Rush by submission / Singles match for the Strong Openweight Championship / 16:19; (c) / – the champion(s) heading into the match
Autumn Attack	October 9–30, 2021	Garland, Texas	Week 1 (October 9): No. / Results / Stipulations / Times; 1 / Minoru Suzuki defeated Fred Rosser / Singles match / 11:34; 2 / Tom Lawlor (c) defeated Ren Narita by submission / Singles match for the Strong Openweight Championship / 20:14; 3 / Jay White defeated Robbie Eagles / Singles match / 18:07; (c) / – the champion(s) heading into the match Week 2 (October 16): No. / Results / Stipulations / Times; 1 / Chris Dickinson defeated Alex Coughlin by submission / Singles match / 13:03; 2 / Mega Coaches (Ryusuke Taguchi and Rocky Romero) defeated West Coast Wrecking Crew (Royce Isaacs and Jorel Nelson) / Tag team match / 13:41; 3 / TJP, Clark Connors, Lio Rush and Juice Robinson defeated Bullet Club (Taiji Ishimori, El Phantasmo, Chris Bey and Hikuleo) by disqualification / Eight-man tag team match / 11:07; 4 / Will Ospreay defeated Karl Fredericks / Singles match / 18:08; Week 3 (October 23): No. / Results / Stipulations / Times; 1 / Ryusuke Taguchi, Ren Narita, Alex Coughlin, The DKC, and Kevin Knight defeated David Finlay, Brogan Finlay, Will AllDay, Wheeler Yuta, and Fred Yehi by submission / Ten-man tag team match / 14:49; 2 / Chris Dickinson and Robbie Eagles defeated Bullet Club (El Phantasmo and Chris Bey) / Tag team match / 12:34; 3 / United Empire (Will Ospreay and TJP) defeated Clark Connors and Karl Fredericks / Tag team match / 10:42; 4 / Juice Robinson defeated Hikuleo by referee stoppage / Texas Bullrope match / 13:40; Week 4 (October 30): No. / Results / Stipulations / Times; 1 / Rocky Romero and Fred Rosser defeated Team Filthy (Danny Limelight and J. R. Kratos) / Tag team match / 14:40; 2 / Lio Rush defeated Taiji Ishimori / Singles match / 15:13; 3 / Suzuki-gun (Lance Archer and Minoru Suzuki) defeated Team Filthy (Royce Isaacs and Tom Lawlor) / Tag team match / 11:07
New Japan Showdown (2021)	November 6–27, 2021	Philadelphia, Pennsylvania	Week 1 (November 6): No. / Results / Stipulations / Times; 1 / Team Filthy (J. R. Kratos, and West Coast Wrecking Crew (Royce Isaacs and Jorel Nelson)) defeated David Finlay, Yuya Uemura, and Clark Connors / Six-man tag team match / 10:29; 2 / Juice Robinson defeated El Phantasmo / Singles match / 13:50; 3 / Clark Connors and Ren Narita defeated United Empire (Will Ospreay and TJP) / Tag team match / 13:27; Week 2 (November 13): No. / Results / Stipulations / Times; 1 / Alex Zayne defeated Ariya Daivari / Singles match / 10:49; 2 / Rocky Romero and Fred Rosser defeated Team Filthy (Danny Limelight and Tom Lawlor) / Tag team match / 11:32; 3 / Jay White defeated Fred Yehi / Singles match / 12:47; 4 / Minoru Suzuki defeated Chris Dickinson / Singles match / 18:57; Week 3 (November 20): No. / Results / Stipulations / Times; 1 / FinJuice (Juice Robinson and David Finlay) defeated Kevin Knight and The DKC / Tag team match / 12:54; 2 / Bullet Club (Chris Bey and El Phantasmo) defeated Lio Rush and Ariya Daivari / Tag team match / 13:12; 3 / TJP defeated Clark Connors / Singles match / 16:44; Week 4 (November 27) Matches recorded on October 17, 2021 at 2300 Arena. On November 2, 2021, it was announced on Twitter that Jon Moxley had entered an inpatient alcohol treatment program and withdrawing from all professional wrestling events.: No. / Results / Stipulations / Times; 1 / Jonathan Gresham defeated Alex Coughlin / Singles match / 9:51; 2 / The DKC, Ren Narita, Karl Fredericks, Rocky Romero, and Fred Rosser defeated Team Filthy (Tom Lawlor, J. R. Kratos, West Coast Wrecking Crew (Jorel Nelson and Royce Isaacs) and Danny Limelight) by disqualification / Ten-man tag team match / 11:10; 3 / Daniel Garcia, Chris Dickinson, and Brody King defeated Stray Dog Army (Barrett Brown, Bateman, and Misterioso) / Six-man tag team match / 8:07; 4 / Suzuki-gun (Minoru Suzuki and Lance Archer) defeated Jon Moxley and Eddie Kingston / Philadelphia Street fight / 14:28
Detonation (2021)	December 4–18, 2021	Riverside, California	Week 1 (December 4): No. / Results / Stipulations / Times; 1 / Lio Rush and Adrian Quest defeated Stray Dog Army (Bateman and Misterioso) / Tag team match / 10:57; 2 / Josh Barnett defeated Alex Coughlin by submission / Singles match / 11:47; 3 / Jonah defeated Lucas Riley / Singles match / 6:01; 4 / Hikuleo and Jay White defeated Yuya Uemura and Alex Zayne / Tag team match / 10:32; Week 2 (December 11): No. / Results / Stipulations / Times; 1 / Jonathan Gresham defeated Gabriel Kidd / Singles match / 13:47; 2 / United Empire (Will Ospreay, TJP, and Jeff Cobb) defeated Karl Fredericks, Clark Connors, and Ren Narita / Six-man tag team match / 13:24; 3 / Tomohiro Ishii defeated Brody King / Singles match / 13:37; Week 3 (December 18): No. / Results / Stipulations / Times; 1 / Kevin Knight and The DKC defeated Jordan Clearwater and Brogan Finlay / Tag team match / 8:08; 2 / Team Filthy (J. R. Kratos, Royce Isaacs, and Black Tiger) defeated Rocky Romero and FinJuice (Juice Robinson and David Finlay) / Six-man tag team match / 14:05; 3 / Tom Lawlor (c) defeated Fred Rosser by submission / Singles match for the Strong Openweight Championship / 24:28; (c) / – the champion(s) heading into the match
Nemesis	January 8–29, 2022	Hollywood, California	Week 1 (January 8): No. / Results / Stipulations / Times; 1 / TJP defeated The DKC / Singles match / 8:31; 2 / Bullet Club (Hikuleo and Chris Bey) defeated Jordan Clearwater and Keita Murray / Tag team match / 9:12; 3 / Eddie Kingston defeated Gabriel Kidd / Singles match / 12:37; Week 2 (January 15): No. / Results / Stipulations / Times; 1 / Karl Fredericks and Kevin Knight defeated Stray Dog Army (Bateman and Misterioso) / Tag team match / 10:04; 2 / Brody King defeated Dave Dutra / Singles match / 6:31; 3 / Jonah defeated David Finlay / Singles match / 8:20; Week 3 (January 22): No. / Results / Stipulations / Times; 1 / Royce Isaacs defeated Lucas Riley / Singles match / 7:24; 2 / Juice Robinson defeated Bad Dude Tito / Singles match / 9:37; 3 / Rocky Romero, Fred Rosser, and Taylor Rust defeated Team Filthy (Tom Lawlor, Black Tiger, and Jorel Nelson) / Six-man tag team match / 11:35; Week 4 (January 29): No. / Results / Stipulations / Times; 1 / Alex Zayne defeated Ariya Daivari / Singles match / 10:07; 2 / Alex Coughlin defeated J. R. Kratos / Singles match / 9:22; 3 / Jay White defeated Christopher Daniels / Singles match / 19:07
The New Beginning USA (2022)	February 5–26, 2022	Seattle, Washington	Week 1 (February 5): No. / Results / Stipulations / Times; 1 / Brody King defeated Yuya Uemura / Singles match / 12:56; 2 / West Coast Wrecking Crew (Royce Isaacs and Jorel Nelson) defeated Roppongi Rush (Rocky Romero and Lio Rush) by submission / Tag team match / 10:52; 3 / Clark Connors defeated TJP / Singles match / 18:19; Week 2 (February 12): No. / Results / Stipulations / Times; 1 / Hikuleo defeated Cody Chhun / Singles match / 8:32; 2 / Josh Barnett defeated Ren Narita by submission / Singles match / 10:37; 3 / FinJuice (David Finlay and Juice Robinson) defeated Jonah and Bad Dude Tito / Tag team match / 12:26; Week 3 (February 19): No. / Results / Stipulations / Times; 1 / Midnight Heat (Ricky Gibson and Eddie Pearl) defeated The DKC and Kevin Knight / Tag team match / 9:18; 2 / Fred Rosser defeated Gabriel Kidd / Singles match / 14:52; 3 / Jay White defeated Jay Lethal / Singles match / 20:07; Week 4 (February 26): No. / Results / Stipulations / Times; 1 / Karl Fredericks defeated Ethan HD / Singles match / 11:51; 2 / El Phantasmo defeated Matt Rehwoldt / Singles match / 9:45; 3 / Tom Lawlor (c) defeated Taylor Rust / Singles match for the Strong Openweight Championship / 19:11; (c) / – the champion(s) heading into the match
Rivals	March 5–26, 2022	Hollywood, California	Week 1 (March 5): No. / Results / Stipulations / Times; 1 / TJP defeated Brogan Finlay by submission / Singles match / 9:06; 2 / Christopher Daniels defeated Karl Fredericks / Singles match / 11:40; 3 / Jonah and Bad Dude Tito defeated FinJuice (David Finlay and Juice Robinson) / Tag team match / 8:16; Week 2 (March 12): No. / Results / Stipulations / Times; 1 / Hikuleo defeated Kevin Knight / Singles match / 8:13; 2 / Kevin Blackwood defeated Ariya Daivari / Singles match / 8:51; 3 / Jay White defeated Sw3rve / Singles match / 17:15; Week 3 (March 19): No. / Results / Stipulations / Times; 1 / Keita Murray, The DKC and Fred Yehi defeated Stray Dog Army (Misterioso, Bateman and Barrett Brown) / Six-man tag team match / 10:05; 2 / Chris Bey defeated Blake Christian / Singles match / 10:23; 3 / Buddy Matthews defeated Ren Narita / Singles match / 15:32; Week 4 (March 26): No. / Results / Stipulations / Times; 1 / Daniel Garcia defeated Yuya Uemura / Singles match / 10:39; 2 / Black Tiger defeated Rocky Romero / Singles match / 11:02; 3 / Team Filthy (Tom Lawlor, Danny Limelight, West Coast Wrecking Crew (Jorel Nelson and Royce Isaacs) and J. R. Kratos) defeated Clark Connors, Fred Rosser, Taylor Rust, Adrian Quest and The DKC / Ten-man elimination tag team match / 16:29
Strong Style Evolved (2022)	April 2–9, 2022; April 23–30, 2022	Tampa, Florida	Week 1 (April 2): No. / Results / Stipulations / Times; 1 / Team Filthy (J. R. Kratos and Black Tiger) defeated Chaos (Rocky Romero and Wheeler Yuta) / Tag team match / 9:50; 2 / TMDK (Jonah and Shane Haste) defeated FinJuice (David Finlay and Juice Robinson) by disqualification / Tag team match / 6:34; 3 / Tom Lawlor (c) defeated Clark Connors / Singles match for the Strong Openweight Championship / 13:58; (c) / – the champion(s) heading into the match Week 2 (April 9): No. / Results / Stipulations / Times; 1 / Hikuleo defeated Andy Brown / Singles match / 4:34; 2 / Josh Alexander defeated Karl Fredericks / Singles match / 14:14; 3 / Fred Rosser and Eddie Kingston defeated Fred Yehi and Daniel Garcia / Tag team match / 9:27; 4 / Jay White defeated Chris Sabin / Singles match / 18:09; Week 3 (April 23): No. / Results / Stipulations / Times; 1 / Big Damo defeated Jon Skyler / Singles match / 7:04; 2 / Sw3rve defeated Blake Christian / Singles match / 11:27; 3 / Buddy Matthews defeated Yuya Uemura / Singles match / 9:50; Week 4 (April 30): No. / Results / Stipulations / Times; 1 / The DKC defeated Kevin Knight by submission / Singles match / 7:45; 2 / Máscara Dorada defeated TJP / Singles match / 10:50; 3 / Jay Lethal defeated Ren Narita / Singles match / 12:17
Lonestar Shootout 2022	May 7, 2022	Dallas, Texas	April 1: No. / Results / Stipulations / Times; 1 / Ren Narita defeated Rocky Romero / Singles match / 7:42; 2 / Clark Connors, Karl Fredericks, Mascara Dorada and Yuya Uemura defeated FinJuice (David Finlay and Juice Robinson), Daniel Garcia and Kevin Knight / Eight-man tag team match / 10:45; 3 / Minoru Suzuki defeated Killer Kross / Singles match / 9:48; 4 / Jay White defeated Mike Bailey / "U-S-of-Jay" open challenge series / 14:10; 5 / Tomohiro Ishii defeated Chris Dickinson / Singles match / 16:11; Matches recorded on April 1, 2022 at Fairmont Hotel. Aired May 7, 2022.: No. / Results / Stipulations / Times; 1 / Bullet Club (Chris Bey & Hikuleo) defeated Stray Dog Army (Barrett Brown and Bateman) / Tag team match / 12:16; 2 / Jonah defeated Blake Christian / Singles match / 6:56; 3 / Team Filthy (J. R. Kratos, Royce Isaacs and Tom Lawlor) defeated Fred Rosser, Alex Coughlin and The DKC / Six-man tag team match / 11:12
Mutiny	May 13–June 4, 2022	Hollywood, California	Week 1 (May 13): No. / Results / Stipulations / Times; 1 / Rocky Romero, Adrian Quest and Alex Coughlin defeated Team Filthy (Danny Limelight, J. R. Kratos and Black Tiger) / Six-man tag team match / 8:33; 2 / West Coast Wrecking Crew (Jorel Nelson and Royce Isaacs) defeated Fred Rosser / Handicap match / 7:28; 3 / Jay White defeated Hikuleo / Singles match / 18:33; Week 2 (May 21): No. / Results / Stipulations / Times; 1 / Ren Narita vs. Chris Dickinson ended in a time limit draw / Singles match / 15:00; 2 / Clark Connors and Karl Fredericks (w/ Yuya Uemura) defeated The Factory (Aaron Solow and Nick Comoroto) (w/ Q. T. Marshall) / Tag team match / 8:21; 3 / United Empire (Aaron Henare, Great-O-Khan, and TJP) defeated Taylor Rust, Brody King, and Máscara Dorada / Six-man tag team match / 14:04; Week 3 (May 28): No. / Results / Stipulations / Times; 1 / Stray Dog Army (Bateman, Misterioso, and Barrett Brown) defeated Fred Yehi, The DKC, and Kevin Knight / Six-man tag team match / 10:06; 2 / David Finlay defeated Blake Christian / Singles match / 10:07; 3 / United Empire (Jeff Cobb, Mark Davis, and Kyle Fletcher) defeated TMDK (Bad Dude Tito, Jonah, and Shane Haste) / Six-man tag team match / 14:39; Week 4 (June 4): No. / Results / Stipulations / Times; 1 / Keita and Yuya Uemura defeated Kevin Blackwood and Lucas Riley / Tag team match / 8:33; 2 / Bullet Club (Chris Bey and El Phantasmo) defeated Alex Zayne and Christopher Daniels / Tag team match / 9:58; 3 / Tomohiro Ishii defeated Big Damo / Singles match / 13:02
Collision (2022)	June 11–July 2, 2022	Philadelphia, Pennsylvania	Week 1 (June 11): No. / Results / Stipulations / Times; 1 / Killer Kross defeated Yuya Uemura by referee stoppage / Singles match / 7:48; 2 / Karl Fredericks defeated Q. T. Marshall / Singles match / 10:21; 3 / Bullet Club (Jay White, Juice Robinson, Hikuleo, Doc Gallows, and Karl Anderson) defeated Máscara Dorada, Ren Narita, and Chaos (Rocky Romero, Chuck Taylor, and Tomohiro Ishii) / Ten-man tag team match / 12:43; Week 2 (June 18): No. / Results / Stipulations / Times; 1 / Team Filthy (J. R. Kratos, Jorel Nelson, and Royce Isaacs) defeated Alex Coughlin, The DKC, and Kevin Knight / Six-man tag team match / 9:21; 2 / Ariya Daivari defeated Delirious / Singles match / 10:15; 3 / Brody King defeated Jake Something / Singles match / 8:27; 4 / Hiroshi Tanahashi defeated Chris Dickinson / Singles match / 13:15; Week 3 (June 25): No. / Results / Stipulations / Times; 1 / David Finlay defeated Danny Limelight / Singles match / 6:30; 2 / Minoru Suzuki defeated Tony Deppen / Singles match / 10:30; 3 / Fred Rosser defeated Tom Lawlor (c) by submission / Title vs. Loser Leaves Town match for the Strong Openweight Championship; Had Rosser lost, he would have had to leave NJPW Strong. / 24:17; (c) / – the champion(s) heading into the match Week 4 (July 2) Promoted as United Empire: Rising.: No. / Results / Stipulations / Times; 1 / United Empire (Aaron Henare, Great-O-Khan, Mark Davis, and Kyle Fletcher) defeated TMDK (Jonah, Shane Haste, Mikey Nicholls, and Bad Dude Tito) / Eight-man tag team match / 11:35; 2 / Jeff Cobb defeated Willie Mack / Singles match / 13:13; 3 / Will Ospreay defeated Homicide / Singles match / 20:47
Ignition (2022)	July 9–30, 2022	Hollywood, California	Week 1 (July 9): No. / Results / Stipulations / Times; 1 / Christopher Daniels and Yuya Uemura defeated The Factory (Aaron Solow and Nick Comoroto) / First round tag team match in the Strong Openweight Tag Team Championship tournament / 9:17; 2 / Jonah defeated Taylor Rust / Singles match / 12:50; 3 / TMDK (Shane Haste and Mikey Nicholls) defeated West Coast Wrecking Crew (Royce Isaacs and Jorel Nelson) / First round tag team match in the Strong Openweight Tag Team Championship tournament / 10:21; Week 2 (July 16): No. / Results / Stipulations / Times; 1 / Stray Dog Army (Misterioso and Barret Brown) defeated Midnight Heat (Ricky Gibson and Eddie Pearl) / First round tag team match in the Strong Openweight Tag Team Championship tournament / 8:28; 2 / Tom Lawlor defeated Bad Dude Tito / Singles match / 12:07; 3 / Aussie Open (Kyle Fletcher and Mark Davis) defeated The Dark Order (Evil Uno and Alan Angels) / First round tag team match in the Strong Openweight Tag Team Championship tournament / 12:44; Week 3 (July 23): No. / Results / Stipulations / Times; 1 / J. R. Kratos defeated Jordan Cruz / Singles match / 4:11; 2 / Máscara Dorada, Rocky Romero, and David Finlay defeated Lucas Riley, Adrian Quest, and Negro Casas / Six-man tag team match / 11:03; 3 / Christopher Daniels and Yuya Uemura defeated TMDK (Shane Haste and Mikey Nicholls) / Semi-final tag team match in the Strong Openweight Tag Team Championship tournament / 10:02; Week 4 (July 30): No. / Results / Stipulations / Times; 1 / Jeff Cobb defeated Jordan Clearwater / Singles match / 4:27; 2 / Fred Yehi defeated Bateman by submission / Singles match / 7:30; 3 / Aussie Open (Kyle Fletcher and Mark Davis) defeated Stray Dog Army (Misterioso and Barret Brown) / Semi-final tag team match in the Strong Openweight Tag Team Championship tournament / 7:27; 4 / Bullet Club (Jay White, Hikuleo, and Chase Owens) defeated Hiroshi Tanahashi, Fred Rosser, and Kevin Knight / Six-man tag team match / 15:41
High Alert	August 13–September 3, 2022	Charlotte, North Carolina	Week 1 (August 13): No. / Results / Stipulations / Times; 1 / Shane Haste defeated Jorel Nelson / Singles match / 8:16; 2 / Big Damo defeated Hikuleo / Singles match / 6:18; 3 / Aussie Open (Kyle Fletcher and Mark Davis) defeated Christopher Daniels and Yuya Uemura / Final match in the Strong Openweight Tag Team Championship tournament / 11:57; Week 2 (August 20): No. / Results / Stipulations / Times; 1 / J. R. Kratos defeated Drew Adler / Singles match / 4:43; 2 / Dax Harwood defeated Rocky Romero by submission / Singles match / 10:26; 3 / El Desperado defeated Blake Christian and Hiromu Takahashi / Three-Way match / 19:19; Week 3 (August 27): No. / Results / Stipulations / Times; 1 / The DKC and Kevin Knight defeated The Heat Seekers (Matt Sigmon and Elliot Russell) / Tag team match / 9:55; 2 / QT Marshall defeated Parker Lee / Singles match / 2:56; 3 / TJP defeated Máscara Dorada / Singles match / 11:55; 4 / Kushida and Ren Narita defeated The Workhorsemen (Anthony Henry and JD Drake) / Tag team match / 11:18; Week 4 (September 3): No. / Results / Stipulations / Times; 1 / John Skyler defeated Lucky Ali / Singles match / 10:56; 2 / Eddie Kingston defeated Jake Something / Singles match / 8:35; 3 / Fred Rosser (c) defeated Fred Yehi / Singles match for the Strong Openweight Championship / 8:20; (c) / – the champion(s) heading into the match
Fighting Spirit Unleashed	September 10–October 1, 2022	Hollywood, California	Week 1 (September 10): No. / Results / Stipulations / Times; 1 / Máscara Dorada defeated Misterioso / Singles match / 9:41; 2 / Robbie Eagles defeated Kevin Blackwood / Singles match / 11:32; 3 / Aussie Open (Kyle Fletcher and Mark Davis) (c) defeated West Coast Wrecking Crew (Jorel Nelson and Royce Isaacs) / Tag team match for the Strong Openweight Tag Team Championship / 11:38; (c) / – the champion(s) heading into the match Week 2 (September 17): No. / Results / Stipulations / Times; 1 / Peter Avalon defeated Adrian Quest / Singles match / 8:52; 2 / Team Filthy (J. R. Kratos and Tom Lawlor) defeated Jordan Cruz and Cody Chhun / Tag team match / 9:54; 3 / Bullet Club (Hikuleo, Chase Owens, Juice Robinson, and Jay White) defeated Taylor Rust, Roppongi Vice (Trent Beretta and Rocky Romero), and Kushida / Eight-man tag team match / 14:46; Week 3 (September 24): No. / Results / Stipulations / Times; 1 / QT Marshall defeated Keita / Singles match / 5:12; 2 / TMDK (Bad Dude Tito and Shane Haste) defeated Christopher Daniels and Yuya Uemura / Tag team match / 9:10; 3 / Ren Narita defeated Jakob Austin Young / Singles match / 4:48; 4 / Taiji Ishimori defeated Alan Angels / Singles match / 9:14; Week 4 (October 1): No. / Results / Stipulations / Times; 1 / The DKC and Kevin Knight defeated Stray Dog Army (Barrett Brown and Bateman) / Tag team match / 8:16; 2 / Aaron Solo defeated Che Cabrera / Singles match / 8:31; 3 / Fred Rosser (c) defeated TJP / Singles match for the Strong Openweight Championship / 17:20; (c) / – the champion(s) heading into the match
Autumn Action	October 8–29, 2022	Las Vegas, Nevada	Week 1 (October 8): No. / Results / Stipulations / Times; 1 / Shota Umino defeated QT Marshall / Singles match / 10:11; 2 / Ren Narita defeated Juice Robinson by submission / No disqualification match (Note: The original match went 1:20 and was called in favor of Narita by disqualification. The match was later restarted under no disqualification rules.) / 14:45; 3 / Bullet Club (Karl Anderson and Jay White) defeated Homicide and Wheeler Yuta / Tag team match / 14:37; Week 2 (October 15): No. / Results / Stipulations / Times; 1 / Doc Gallows defeated Che Cabrera / Singles match / 7:53; 2 / Aussie Open (Kyle Fletcher and Mark Davis) (c) defeated Team Filthy (Danny Limelight and J. R. Kratos) / Tag team match for the Strong Openweight Tag Team Championship / 10:08; 3 / Fred Rosser (c) vs. Chris Dickinson ended in a double countout / Singles match for the Strong Openweight Championship / 6:48; (c) / – the champion(s) heading into the match Week 3 (October 22): No. / Results / Stipulations / Times; 1 / West Coast Wrecking Crew (Jorel Nelson and Royce Isaacs) defeated Greg Sharpe and Jakob Austin Young / Tag team match / 6:01; 2 / Yuya Uemura defeated Christopher Daniels / Singles match / 9:48; 3 / Shingo Takagi defeated Rocky Romero / Singles match / 15:49; Week 4 (October 29): No. / Results / Stipulations / Times; 1 / Ari Davari defeated Kevin Knight / Singles match / 8:19; 2 / Blake Christian and Máscara Dorada defeated Alex Zayne and Místico / Tag team match / 10:09; 3 / Tomohiro Ishii defeated Tom Lawlor / Singles match / 15:31
New Japan Showdown (2022)	November 5–26, 2022	Hollywood, California	Week 1 (November 5): No. / Results / Stipulations / Times; 1 / Christopher Daniels defeated Rocky Romero / Singles match / 9:24; 2 / Stray Dog Army (Barrett Brown and Misterioso) defeated West Coast Wrecking Crew (Jorel Nelson and Royce Isaacs), The DKC and Kevin Knight, and TMDK (Bad Dude Tito and Shane Haste) / Four-way tag team match / 12:36; 3 / Hiroshi Tanahashi defeated Gabriel Kidd / Singles match / 11:30; Week 2 (November 12): No. / Results / Stipulations / Times; 1 / Kenny King defeated Che Cabrera / Singles match / 8:06; 2 / Team Filthy (Danny Limelight and J. R. Kratos) defeated Jordan Cruz and Adrian Quest / Tag team match / 8:20; 3 / Minoru Suzuki defeated Fred Yehi / Singles match / 16:27; Week 3 (November 19): No. / Results / Stipulations / Times; 1 / Peter Avalon defeated Keita by submission / Singles match / 8:58; 2 / Bullet Club (Chris Bey and El Phantasmo) defeated Blake Christian and Mascara Dorada / Tag team match / 10:44; 3 / Homicide defeated Tom Lawlor / Singles match / 13:44; Week 4 (November 26): No. / Results / Stipulations / Times; 1 / Aussie Open (Kyle Fletcher and Mark Davis) defeated Greg Sharpe and Jakob Austin Young / Tag team match / 5:51; 2 / Juice Robinson defeated Jake Something / Singles match / 10:44; 3 / Jay White defeated Fred Rosser / Singles match / 19:22
Detonation (2022)	December 3–24, 2022	Hollywood, California	Week 1 (December 3): No. / Results / Stipulations / Times; 1 / Adrian Quest and Rocky Romero defeated Atlantis Jr. and Virus / Lucha Libre rules tag match / 10:33; 2 / Homicide defeated Danny Limelight / Singles match / 11:14; 3 / Juice Robinson defeated Blake Christian / Singles match / 9:33; Week 2 (December 10): No. / Results / Stipulations / Times; 1 / Kenny King defeated Gregory Sharpe / Singles match / 9:43; 2 / Christopher Daniels defeated The DKC / Singles match / 9:15; 3 / Alan Angels, David Finlay, Hikuleo, and Tama Tonga defeated West Coast Wrecking Crew (Jorel Nelson and Royce Isaacs) and Bullet Club (El Phantasmo and Jay White) / Eight-man tag team match / 13:20; Week 3 (December 17): No. / Results / Stipulations / Times; 1 / Bateman defeated Jakob Austin Young / Singles match / 7:49; 2 / Kenta defeated Bad Dude Tito / Singles match / 7:53; 3 / Motor City Machine Guns (Alex Shelley and Chris Sabin) (c) defeated Barrett Brown and Misterioso / Tag team match for the Strong Openweight Tag Team Championship / 12:11; (c) / – the champion(s) heading into the match Week 4 (December 24): No. / Results / Stipulations / Times; 1 / Lince Dorado and Mascara Dorada defeated C4 (Guillermo Rosas and Cody Chhun) / Tag team match / 10:35; 2 / Bobby Fish defeated Kevin Blackwood / Singles match / 12:00; 3 / Fred Rosser (c) defeated J. R. Kratos by submission / Singles match for the Strong Openweight Championship / 18:44; (c) / – the champion(s) heading into the match
Nemesis (2023)	January 7–28, 2023	Hollywood, California	Week 1 (January 7): No. / Results / Stipulations / Times; 1 / Bullet Club (Jay White and El Phantasmo) defeated Alan Angels and Hikuleo / Tag team match / 8:47; 2 / Kenta won by last eliminating Wheeler Yuta / 16-man battle royal to determine the #1 contender to the NEVER Openweight Championship (Note: Other participants were: Adrian Quest, Bateman, Blake Christian, Che Cabrera, Christopher Daniels, Cody Chhun, Guillermo Rosas, Jakob Austin Young, J. R. Kratos, Keita, Mascara Dorada, Misterioso, Rocky Romero and The DKC) / 15:45; Week 2 (January 14): No. / Results / Stipulations / Times; 1 / Mascara Dorada defeated Che Cabrera / Singles match / 7:21; 2 / Team Filthy (Tom Lawlor and Danny Limelight) and Bobby Fish defeated Homicide, Eddie Kingston, and David Finlay / Six-man tag team match / 9:40; 3 / Jeff Cobb defeated Bad Dude Tito / Singles match / 7:33; Week 3 (January 21): No. / Results / Stipulations / Times; 1 / West Coast Wrecking Crew (Jorel Nelson and Royce Isaacs) defeated C4 (Guillermo Rosas and Cody Chhun) / Tag team match / 10:37; 2 / Kenta defeated QT Marshall / Singles match / 12:35; 3 / Motor City Machine Guns (Alex Shelley and Chris Sabin) (c) defeated Roppongi Vice (Rocky Romero and Trent Beretta) / Tag team match for the Strong Openweight Tag Team Championship / 18:12; (c) / – the champion(s) heading into the match

== See also ==
- List of major NJPW events
