= Windy City Riot (2022) =

2022 New Japan Pro-Wrestling professional wrestling event

- Promotional poster featuring several NJPW wrestlers
- Promotion: New Japan Pro-Wrestling
- Date: April 16, 2022
- City: Villa Park, Illinois
- Venue: Odeum Expo Center
- Attendance: 2,277

Event chronology
← Previous; Hyper Battle '22	Next → Golden Fight Series; Wrestling Dontaku 2022

Windy City Riot chronology
← Previous —	Next → 2024

Windy City Riot was a professional wrestling event produced by New Japan Pro-Wrestling (NJPW). It took place on April 16, 2022, at the Odeum Expo Center in Villa Park, Illinois. It was the inaugural event under the Windy City Riot chronology.

Nine matches were contested at the event. In the main event, Jon Moxley defeated Will Ospreay. In other prominent matches, Tomohiro Ishii defeated Minoru Suzuki, Juice Robinson, David Finlay and Brody King defeated Jonah, Shane Haste and Bad Dude Tito in a Chicago Street Fight, and Tom Lawlor defeated Yuji Nagata to retain the Strong Openweight Championship. The event also saw Shota Umino's return to the company from excursion in a losing effort to Jay White.

This was the final event held at the Odeum Expo Center, as the venue permanently closed in May 2022.

== Storylines ==
Windy City Riot featured nine professional wrestling matches that involve different wrestlers from pre-existing scripted feuds and storylines. Wrestlers portrayed villains, heroes, or less distinguishable characters in the scripted events that built tension and culminated in a wrestling match or series of matches.

== Results ==
No.	Results	Stipulations	Times
1^{D}	Wheeler Yuta and Rocky Romero defeated The DKC and Kevin Knight by pinfall	Tag team match	9:30
2	The Factory (Q. T. Marshall, Aaron Solo and Nick Comoroto) defeated LA Dojo (Karl Fredericks, Clark Connors and Yuya Uemura) by pinfall	Six-man tag team match	11:56
3	Fred Rosser, Josh Alexander, Alex Coughlin, Ren Narita and Chris Dickinson defeated Team Filthy (Royce Isaacs, Jorel Nelson, JR Kratos, Black Tiger and Danny Limelight) by submission	Ten-man tag team match	13:50
4	Tom Lawlor (c) defeated Yuji Nagata by pinfall	Singles match for the Strong Openweight Championship	13:57
5	United Empire (Aaron Henare, Great-O-Khan, Jeff Cobb, TJP, Mark Davis and Kyle Fletcher) defeated Bullet Club (Hikuleo, Chris Bey, El Phantasmo, Karl Anderson, Doc Gallows and Scott Norton) by pinfall	Twelve-man tag team match	11:58
6	FinJuice (David Finlay and Juice Robinson) and Brody King defeated TMDK (Jonah and Shane Haste) and Bad Dude Tito by pinfall	Chicago Street Fight	24:11
7	Jay White defeated Shota Umino by pinfall	Singles match	15:45
8	Tomohiro Ishii defeated Minoru Suzuki by pinfall	Singles match	18:46
9	Jon Moxley defeated Will Ospreay by pinfall	Singles match	21:24
(c) / – the champion(s) heading into the match; D / – this was a dark match
