= Windy City Riot =

- Promotions: New Japan Pro-Wrestling
- First event: Windy City Riot (2022)

Windy City Riot is an annual professional wrestling event promoted by New Japan Pro-Wrestling (NJPW). The event takes its name from the term Windy City, the nickname of the city of Chicago.

== Events ==
#	Event	Date	City	Venue	Attendance	Main event	Ref(s)
1	Windy City Riot (2022)	April 16, 2022	Villa Park, Illinois	Odeum Expo Center	2,277	Jon Moxley vs. Will Ospreay	
2	Windy City Riot (2024)	April 12, 2024	Chicago, Illinois	Wintrust Arena	6,028	Jon Moxley vs. Tetsuya Naito (c) for the IWGP World Heavyweight Championship	
3	Windy City Riot (2025)	April 11, 2025	Chicago, Illinois	Wintrust Arena	4,674	Konosuke Takeshita vs. Hiroshi Tanahashi	
(c) – refers to the champion(s) heading into the match

== See also ==
- List of New Japan Pro-Wrestling pay-per-view events
