= Shane Haste =

Australian professional wrestler (born 1985)

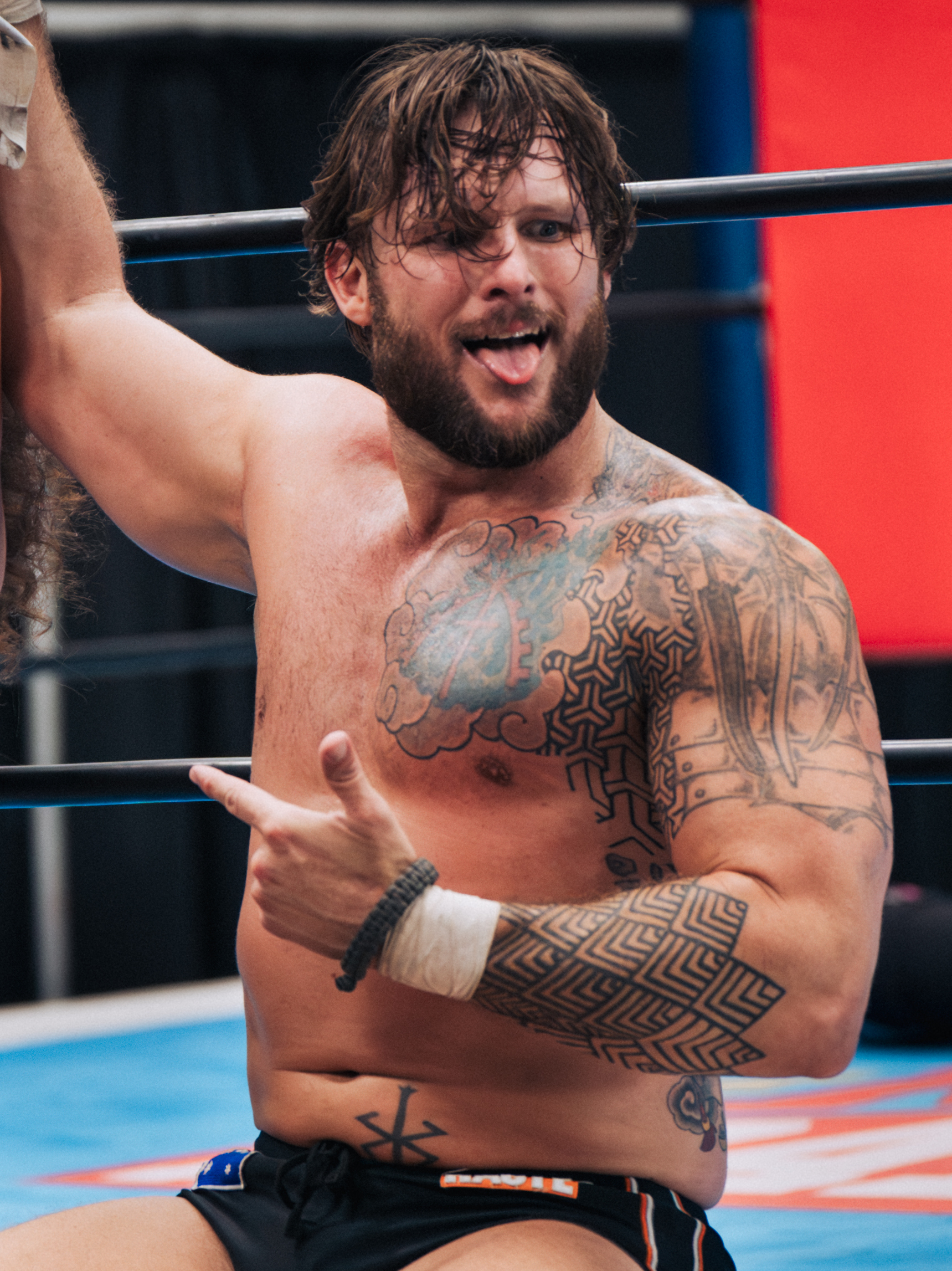
- Haste in 2024

Personal information
- Born: Shane Veryzer; 24 September 1985 (age 41) Perth, Western Australia
- Spouse: Kimmy Jimenez (m. 2023)

Professional wrestling career
- Ring name(s): Shane Haste; Shane Thorne; Slapjack
- Billed height: 6 ft 2 in (188 cm)
- Billed weight: 220 lb (100 kg)
- Billed from: Perth, Western Australia
- Trained by: Davis Storm; Naomichi Marufuji
- Debut: 22 February 2003

Shane Veryzer (born 24 September 1985), known by his ring name Shane Haste, is an Australian professional wrestler. He is currently working as a freelancer, predominantly for Pro Wrestling Noah, where he is a member of The Mighty Don't Kneel (TMDK) and White Raven Squad. He is best known for his time in New Japan Pro-Wrestling (NJPW) and WWE.

Veryzer is known for his work in Pro Wrestling Noah, where, as part of The Mighty Don't Kneel as Shane Haste with partner Mikey Nicholls, he is a former two-time GHC Tag Team Champion, and one-time GHC Heavyweight Champion. He also competed for Ring of Honor (ROH) and Pro Wrestling Guerrilla (PWG) in the United States. He signed with WWE in 2016 and was assigned to the NXT brand, where he was given the Shane Thorne ring name. In early 2020, Thorne debuted on Raw, and in August of that year was repackaged as "Slapjack", a mask wearing member of Retribution. Following the stable's split, he reverted to his previous ring name and was moved to SmackDown. Despite this, he was only limited to dark matches and was released from the promotion in November 2021. He then began working for New Japan Pro-Wrestling (NJPW)'s American subsidiary, where TMDK were reformed as a stable, with Jonah as the leader. In NJPW, he is a one-time IWGP Tag Team Champion and two-time Strong Openweight Tag Team Champion with Nicholls. He and Nicholls both departed NJPW in 2026.

== Early life ==
Shane Veryzer was born on 24 September 1985 in Perth, Western Australia.

== Professional wrestling career ==
=== Early career (2003–2011) ===
Veryzer started training at the Dynamite Factory, the wrestling school of Explosive Pro Wrestling (EPW). His debut match took place at the Uprising event on 22 February 2003 in a four-way match under the Shane Haste ring name. He won the EPW Heavyweight Championship once and the EPW Tag Team Championship twice. After working all over the Australian continent, he moved to California, United States, and started working for independent wrestling promotions in the US, such as Pro Wrestling Guerrilla (PWG) and World League Wrestling (WLW).

=== Pro Wrestling Noah (2011–2016) ===
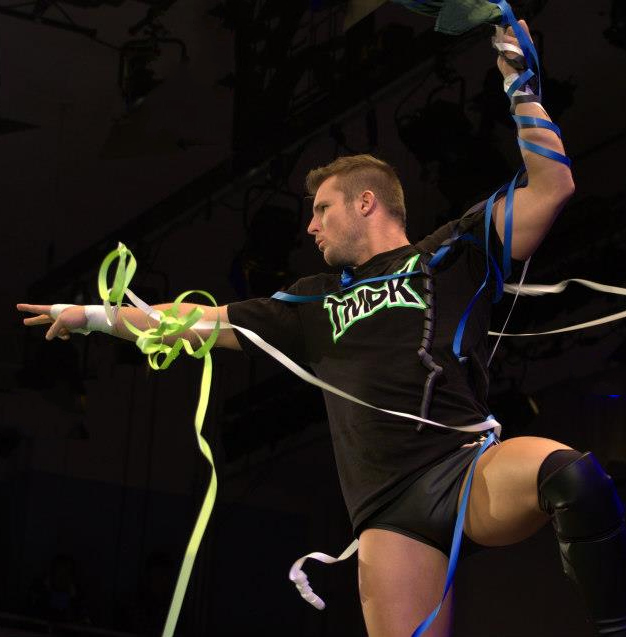
Haste in July 2013

On 23 February 2011, Haste made his debut in Pro Wrestling Noah as he had a tryout match against his teammate Mikey Nicholls. A month after the try-out match, both men started to work full-time with the Japanese promotion. On 7 July, Haste and Nicholls, known together as The Mighty Don't Kneel (TMDK), won the GHC Tag Team Championship after they defeated Toru Yano and Takashi Iizuka. At the end of 2013, the Tokyo Sports magazine named Haste and Nicholls the tag team of the year, making them the first foreign team to win the award since Stan Hansen and Vader in 1998. They lost the title to Maybach Taniguchi and Takeshi Morishima on 25 January 2014.

They regained the title from Dangan Yankies (Masato Tanaka and Takashi Sugiura) on 10 January 2015. They lost the title to K.E.S. (Davey Boy Smith Jr. and Lance Archer) on 11 February. On 28 December, Noah announced that Haste and Nicholls would leave the promotion following their contracts expiring at the end of the year. On 11 February 2016, Noah announced that Haste and Nicholls would return to the promotion the following month to take part in a five-show-long farewell tour, entitled "Departure to the World". Their final Noah match took place on 10 March and saw them defeat Naomichi Marufuji and Mitsuhiro Kitamiya.

=== Other promotions (2012–2016) ===
After starting out in Noah, Haste returned to the United States and compete on Ring of Honor (ROH) in February 2012. He and Nicholls won the Rise and Prove Tournament, defeating two other teams to qualify for a match against The Briscoe Brothers (Jay Briscoe and Mark Briscoe). At the Showdown in the Sun iPPV on 30 March, Haste and Nicholls lost to The Briscoe Brothers in a Proving Ground match.

Also in February 2012, Haste and Nicholls wrestled television matches for Championship Wrestling from Hollywood (CWFH). Also in March 2012, Haste and Nicholls started wrestling for Ohio Valley Wrestling (OVW), during their stint there, they were defeated in a title match for the OVW Southern Tag Team Championship by Jessie Godderz and Rudy Switchblade.

On 20 December 2014, Haste and Nicholls made their debut for New Japan Pro-Wrestling (NJPW), when they, along with Naomichi Marufuji, were revealed as Toru Yano's tag team partners at Wrestle Kingdom 9 on 4 January 2015. At the event, the four defeated Suzuki-gun (Davey Boy Smith Jr., Lance Archer, Shelton X Benjamin, and Takashi Iizuka) in an eight-man tag team match.

=== WWE (2016–2021) ===
==== NXT (2016–2020) ====
In June 2015, Haste and Nicholls took part in a WWE tryout camp. In February 2016, it was reported that Haste and Nicholls were scheduled to join WWE's NXT brand following their Noah farewell tour. On 25 March 2016, WWE confirmed the signings of both Haste and Nicholls, and they began training at the WWE Performance Center, while working for the promotion's developmental branch NXT. On 19 May, Haste and Nicholls were renamed Shane Thorne and Nick Miller, respectively, while TMDK was renamed TM-61. They debuted on 25 May episode of NXT, losing to Johnny Gargano and Tommaso Ciampa. In October, TM-61 entered the Dusty Rhodes Tag Team Classic tournament, in which they defeated Riddick Moss and Tino Sabbatelli in the first round, Austin Aries and Roderick Strong (Thorne defeated Strong in a singles match, due to Aries being unable to wrestle through injury) in the quarterfinals, and SAnitY in the semifinals. At NXT TakeOver: Toronto, TM-61 lost in the finals to The Authors of Pain. Thorne then had knee surgery in January 2017, which was expected to sideline him for seven to nine months. Thorne returned from injury on 14 September. TM-61 returned to television on 31 January 2018 episode of NXT, defeating The Ealy Brothers. TM-61 then entered the Dusty Rhodes Tag Team Classic tournament, being eliminated by The Authors of Pain in the first round. On 2 May episode of NXT, TM-61 defeated The Street Profits with a dirty pin, thus turning heel in the process. On 6 June episode of NXT, the team was renamed The Mighty. On 28 November episode of NXT, The Mighty lost to Oney Lorcan and Danny Burch in what would be their final match as a tag team. On 14 December, Miller was released from his WWE contract, disbanding the team.

On 22 January 2019, WWE announced that Thorne would be replacing Otis Dozovic in the Worlds Collide tournament. Thorne was eliminated in the first round by Adam Cole. Following this, Thorne would mainly wrestle at NXT live events for the next several months. Thorne would then return to television on 7 August episode of NXT, defeating Joaquin Wilde. On 11 September episode of NXT, Thorne would interrupt Johnny Gargano as he was cutting a promo to the crowd which resulted in Thorne getting super kicked by Gargano. The two faced off on the 2 October episode of NXT, with Gargano defeating Thorne.

==== Main roster (2020–2021) ====
In March 2020, Thorne began appearing on Raw alongside his former TMDK stablemate Brendan Vink. On 27 April episode of Raw, Thorne and Vink became MVP's newest associates, as he challenged Cedric Alexander and Ricochet to a match the next week on their behalf. On 4 May episode of Raw, Thorne and Vink defeated Alexander and Ricochet, earning their first victory. However, their alliance with MVP ended after they were both traded back to NXT and Thorne and Vink would quietly disband as a team soon after.

On 21 September 2020 episode of Raw, Thorne was revealed as one of the main members of the Retribution faction, under the new ring name Slapjack. At the Hell in a Cell event, Slapjack challenged Bobby Lashley for the United States Championship, but lost. Retribution disbanded at the Fastlane Kickoff Show, where Reckoning and Slapjack walked out on leader Mustafa Ali, then T-Bar and Mace performed a double chokeslam on Ali after he lost a match for the WWE United States Championship to Riddle. On 9 April episode of SmackDown, Slapjack took part in the André the Giant Memorial Battle Royal but failed to win the match. Following this, Slapjack would be taken off television for several months. Following the split of Retribution, Veryzer would be quietly moved to SmackDown in April. He wrestled in a dark match after the 16 July episode of SmackDown under his original Shane Thorne name. He would wrestle two more dark matches in September with a loss to Keith Lee and a win over Austin Theory respectively. On 18 November 2021, Thorne was released from his WWE contract without ever reappearing on television.

=== New Japan Pro-Wrestling (2022–2026) ===
On the 6 March 2022 episode of NJPW Strong, Haste interfered in the tag team match between FinJuice (David Finlay and Juice Robinson) and the pairing of Jonah and Bad Dude Tito. He attacked Robinson while the referee was distracted, allowing Tito to hit a frog splash on Robinson for the win. This saw the reformation of TMDK, with Haste and Jonah tagging together (as Jonah was a member of the stable on the Australian independent scene). On the 3 April episode of NJPW Strong, Haste caused a disqualification loss to FinJuice after he struck Robinson with a steel chair. Robinson challenged TMDK and Tito to a Chicago Street Fight at Windy City Riot, alongside a mystery partner. At the event, TMDK and Tito were defeated by FinJuice and their partner, revealed to be Brody King. On 14 May, at Capital Collision, Haste reunited with Mikey Nicholls, as TMDK defeated the United Empire. Haste and Nicholls then entered a tournament to become the inaugural Strong Openweight Tag Team Champions, but were defeated in the semi-final to the pairing of Christopher Daniels and Yuya Uemura.

In September, Haste made his debut in Japan for NJPW, working tag matches alongside Jonah and Bad Dude Tito. The following month, Haste and Tito teamed at NJPW Strong: New Japan Showdown, competing in a four-way tag-team match to become the number one contenders for the Strong Openweight Tag Team titles, but the match was won by Stray Dog Army (Barrett Brown and Misterioso). In November, Haste and Nicholls teamed together in the World Tag League. The duo finished with a total of 12 points, narrowly failing to advance to the finals. On 4 January 2023 at Wrestle Kingdom 17, Haste competed in the New Japan Ranbo, but failed to last until the final 4. Later in the show, Haste and Nicholls approached Zack Sabre Jr., who had just won the NJPW World Television Championship, and offered him a TMDK shirt, which he accepted, officially joining the stable. The following day at New Year Dash!!, Sabre teamed with HNicholls and Haste to defeat Chaos (Hirooki Goto, Tomohiro Ishii and Yoshi-Hashi). At the event, the trio also added young lion, Kosei Fujita as a new member. The victory at New Years Dash!! caused Haste and Nicholls to be in contention for the IWGP Tag Team Championship, held by Bishamon (Hirooki Goto and Yoshi-Hashi). Haste and Nicholls received their title shot on 5 February at The New Beginning in Sapporo, but were unsuccessful in defeating Bishamon. In April, the duo faced new champions Aussie Open (Mark Davis and Kyle Fletcher) for the titles, but again failed to capture the titles. In July, Haste was announced to be a part of the 2023 G1 Climax tournament, his first NJPW singles tournament. Haste competed in the D Block, finishing with 5 points, thus failing to advance to the quarterfinals.

On February 3, 2026, Haste announced that he is no longer under contract with NJPW.

=== Pro Wrestling Guerrilla (2022) ===
On 1 May 2022, at Delivering the Goods, Haste was defeated by Jack Cartwheel; it was his first match in Pro Wrestling Guerrilla since 2009. On 3 July, at Nineteen, Haste defeated Titus Alexander.

=== All Elite Wrestling / Ring of Honor (2023–2026) ===
Due to NJPW's working relationship, Haste has made appearances for All Elite Wrestling (AEW) and Ring of Honor (ROH) since 2023, teaming with TMDK stablemates to challenge for the AEW World Trios Championship and ROH World Six-Man Tag Team Championship in 2023 and 2026, and making an appearance at the one year anniversary episode of Collision in 2024. After leaving NJPW in 2026, Haste and tag team partner Mikey Nicholls began working for ROH on the tapings of HonorClub.

=== Return to Pro Wrestling Noah (2026–present) ===
On April 12, 2026 at Apex Conquest, Haste made his return to Pro Wrestling Noah after ten years, where he was revealed as the newest member of White Raven Squad and challenged the reigning GHC Heavyweight Champion Yoshiki Inamura to a title match, which Inamura accepted. Haste defeated Inamura at Spring Mayhem Ryogoku 2026 on May 2 to become the new GHC Heavyweight Champion. On August 9, Haste lost the title to Tetsuya Naito, ending his reign at 99 days and three successful defenses.

== Other media ==
As Shane Thorne, he made his video game debut as a playable character in WWE 2K18 and has since appeared in WWE 2K19 and WWE 2K20. He also appears in WWE 2K22 under his Slapjack persona.

== Personal life ==
Veryzer began dating actress Kimmy Jimenez, of the popular YouTube channel Smosh, in May 2020. The couple announced their engagement in February 2022, and they were married on 20 May 2023. He is agnostic.

== Championships and accomplishments ==
- Explosive Pro Wrestling
  - EPW Heavyweight Championship (1 time)
  - EPW Tag Team Championship (2 times) – with Alex Kingston (1) and Mikey Nicholls (1)
  - ANZAC Day Cup (2009)
  - Invitational Trophy (2007)
  - Match of the Year (2009) with Alex Kingston vs. Chase Griffin and Dan Moore at Evolution
  - Most Improved Wrestler (2006)
  - Rookie of the Year (2003)
  - Wrestler of the Year (2007, 2008)
- New Japan Pro-Wrestling
  - IWGP Tag Team Championship (1 time) — with Mikey Nicholls
  - Strong Openweight Tag Team Championship (2 times) – with Mikey Nicholls
- Pro Wrestling Illustrated
  - Ranked No. 59 of the top 500 singles wrestlers in the PWI 500 in 2026
  - Ranked No. 83 of the top 100 tag teams in the PWI Tag Team 100 in 2023 – with Bad Dude Tito and Mikey Nicholls
- Pro Wrestling Noah
  - GHC Heavyweight Championship (1 time)
  - GHC Tag Team Championship (2 times) – with Mikey Nicholls
  - Global Tag League Fighting Spirit Award (2015) – with Mikey Nicholls
- Ring of Honor
  - Rise and Prove Tournament (2012) – with Mikey Nicholls
- Tokyo Sports
  - Best Tag Team Award (2013) – with Mikey Nicholls
- Westside Pro Wrestling
  - International Impact Award (2011 co-winner, 2012)
  - Tag Team of the Year (2009) with Alex Kingston
  - Tag Team of the Year (2010) with Mikey Nicholls
  - The Grand Slam Club (2011)
- WrestleCrap
  - Gooker Award (2020) – as part of Retribution
- United Wrestling Network
  - UWN Tag Team Championship (1 time) – with Bad Dude Tito
