= Strong Openweight Tag Team Championship =

Men's professional wrestling championship

- Current design of the titles (2022–present)

Details
- Promotion: New Japan Pro-Wrestling (NJPW)
- Brand: Strong
- Date established: June 8, 2022
- Current champions: Unbound Co. (Titán and Taiji Ishimori)
- Date won: November 16, 2026

Other names
- Strong Openweight Tag Team Championship (2022–present); NJPW Strong Openweight Tag Team Championship
Statistics
- First champions: Aussie Open (Kyle Fletcher and Mark Davis)
- Most reigns: As a team (2 reigns): Aussie Open (Kyle Fletcher and Mark Davis); Guerrillas of Destiny (Hikuleo and El Phantasmo); TMDK (Mikey Nicholls and Shane Haste); As individual (2 reigns): El Phantasmo; Hikuleo; Kyle Fletcher; Mark Davis; Mikey Nicholls; Shane Haste
- Longest reign: Los Hermanos Chávez (Ángel de Oro and Niebla Roja) (367 days)
- Shortest reign: TMDK (Mikey Nicholls and Shane Haste) (29 days)
- Oldest champion: Taiji Ishimori (43 years, 279 days)
- Youngest champion: Kyle Fletcher (23 years, 212 days)
- Heaviest champion: Bishamon (Hirooki Goto and Yoshi-Hashi) (452 lbs combined)
- Lightest champion: The Motor City Machine Guns (Alex Shelley and Chris Sabin) (420 lbs combined)

The Strong Openweight Tag Team Championship (STRONG無差別級タッグ王座, STRONG musabetsu-kyū taggu ōza) is a professional wrestling tag team championship owned and promoted by the New Japan Pro-Wrestling (NJPW) promotion. The title was previously exclusively featured on NJPW's Strong brand, but is usually defended at NJPW branded shows in America. The current champions are Unbound Co. (Titán and Taiji Ishimori), who are in their first reign both as a team and individually. They won the title by defeating previous champions Los Hermanos Chávez (Ángel de Oro and Niebla Roja) and United Empire (Templario and Francesco Akira) in a three-way tag team match at Lucha Kingdom on November 16, 2026.

== History ==
On June 8, 2022, NJPW announced the creation of the championship, with it being contested in an eight-team tournament that was then scheduled to determine the inaugural champions, culminating in a final match at Strong: High Alert on July 24, 2022. Aussie Open (Kyle Fletcher and Mark Davis) defeated Christopher Daniels and Yuya Uemura in the tournament final to become the inaugural champions.

== Inaugural championship tournament (2022) ==
=== Tournament bracket ===
Quarterfinals; Strong: Ignition (6/19)
Stray Dog Army (Barrett Brown and Misterioso)	Pin
Midnight Heat (Eddie Pearl and Ricky Gibson)	8:28
Aussie Open (Kyle Fletcher and Mark Davis)	Pin
The Dark Order (Alan Angels and Evil Uno)	12:44
Christopher Daniels and Yuya Uemura	Pin
The Factory (Aaron Solo and Nick Comoroto)	9:17
West Coast Wrecking Crew (Jorel Nelson and Royce Isaacs)	10:21
TMDK (Mikey Nicholls and Shane Haste)	Pin

Semifinals; Strong: Ignition (6/19)
Stray Dog Army	7:27
Aussie Open	Pin
Christopher Daniels and Yuya Uemura	Pin
TMDK	10:02

Final; Strong: High Alert (7/24)
Aussie Open	Pin
Christopher Daniels and Yuya Uemura	11:57

== Reigns ==
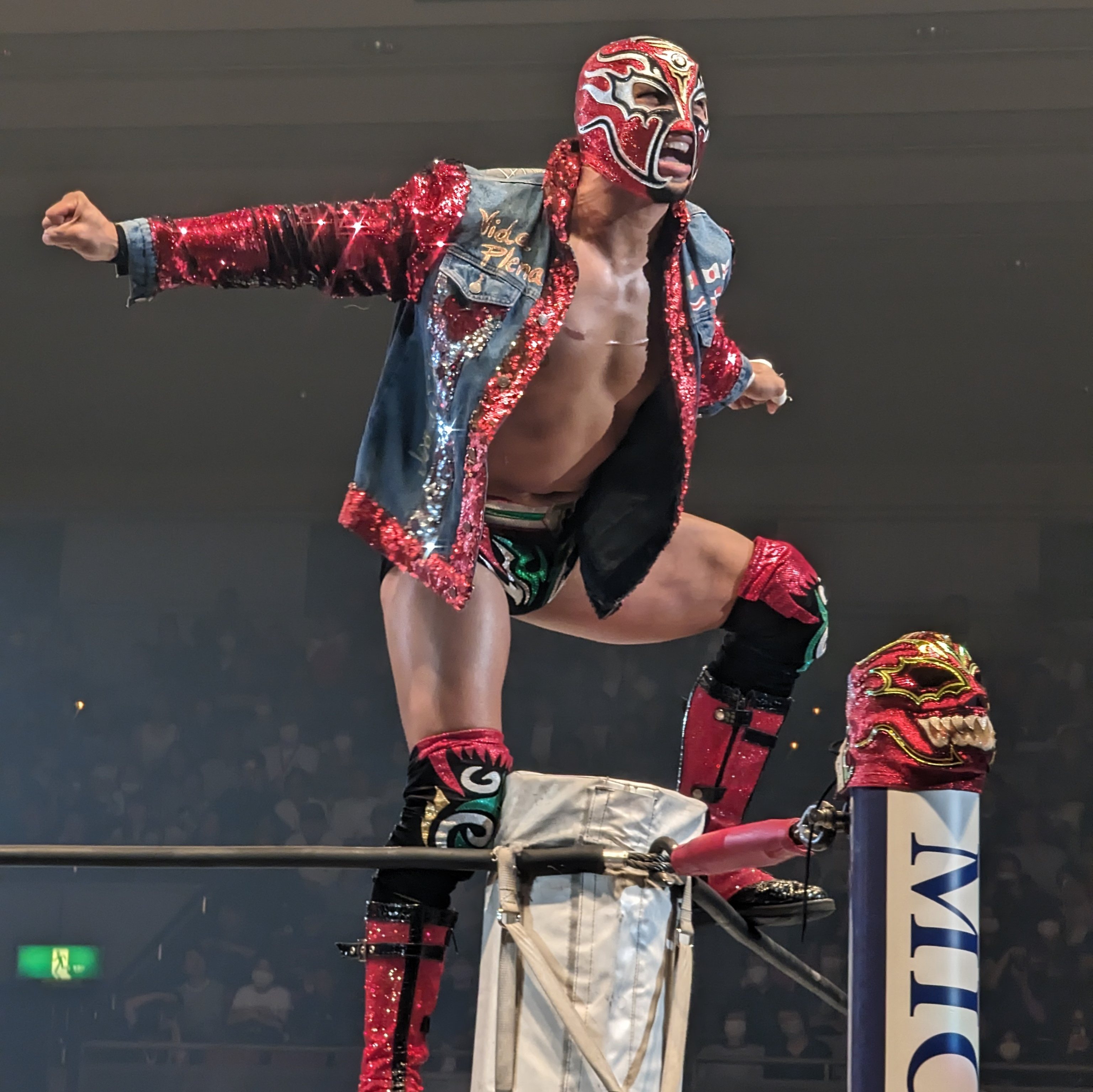
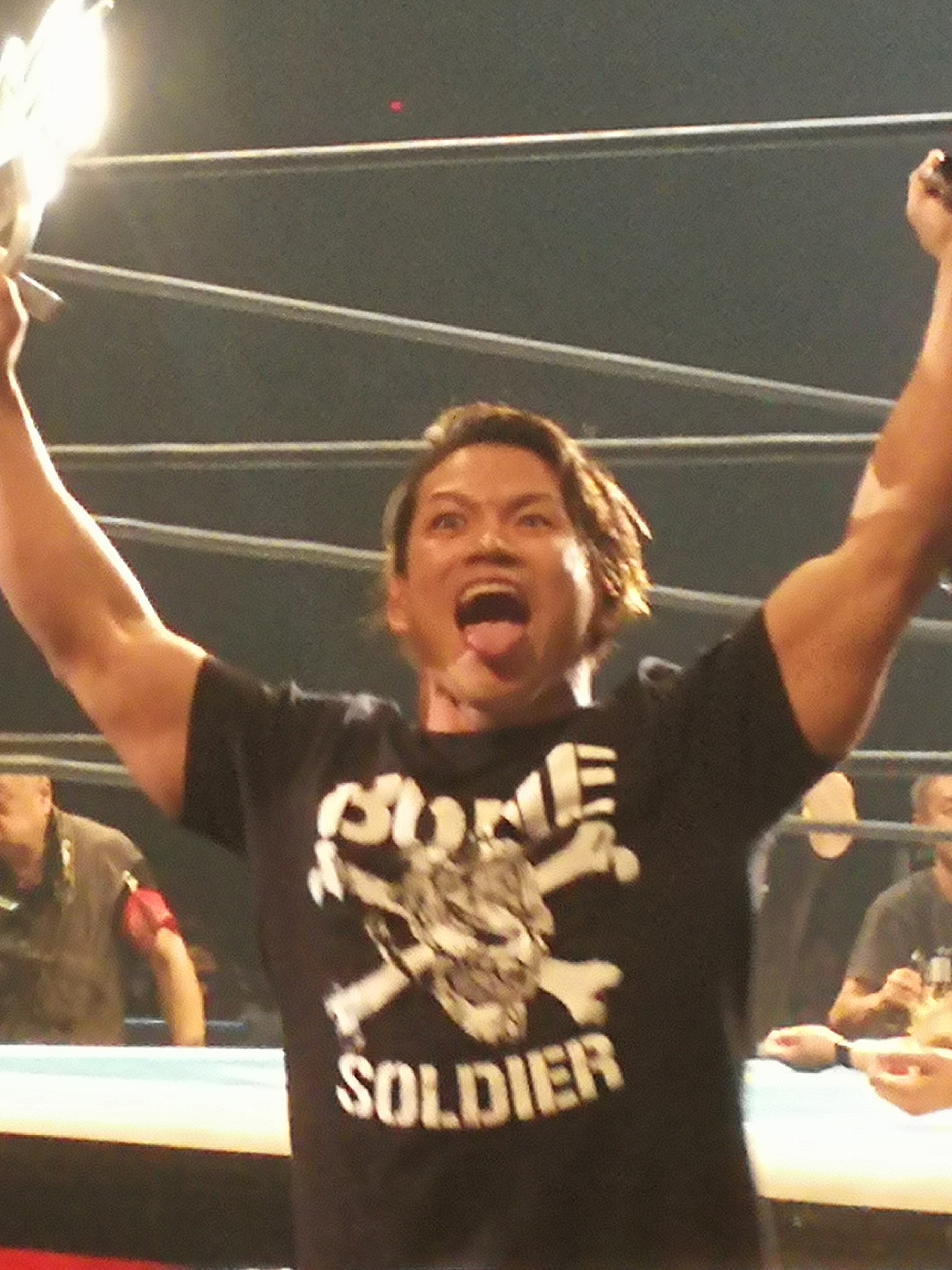
Current champions Titán and Taiji Ishimori.

As of November 20, 2026, there have been a total of thirteen reigns shared between ten different teams composed of twenty individual champions. The inaugural champions were Aussie Open (Kyle Fletcher and Mark Davis). Los Hermanos Chávez (Ángel de Oro and Niebla Roja) have the longest reign in the title's history at 367 days while TMDK (Mikey Nicholls and Shane Haste)'s first reign was the shortest at 29 days. Chris Sabin is the oldest champion at 40, while Kyle Fletcher is the youngest at 23.

Unbound Co. (Titán and Taiji Ishimori) are the current champions in their first reign both as a team and individually. They won the title by defeating previous champions Los Hermanos Chávez (Ángel de Oro and Niebla Roja), and United Empire (Templario and Francesco Akira) in a three-way tag team match at Lucha Kingdom in Cuauhtémoc, Mexico City, on November 16, 2026.

Key
No.	Overall reign number
Reign	Reign number for the specific team—reign numbers for the individuals are in parentheses, if different
Days	Number of days held
Days recog.	Number of days held recognized by the promotion
Defenses	Number of successful defenses
+	Current reign is changing daily

No.	Champion	Championship change			Reign statistics				Notes	Ref.
No.	Champion	Date	Event	Location	Reign	Days	Days recog.	Defenses	Notes	Ref.
New Japan Pro Wrestling (NJPW)
1	Aussie Open (Kyle Fletcher and Mark Davis)	July 24, 2022	Strong: High Alert	Charlotte, NC	1	96	76	3	Defeated Christopher Daniels and Yuya Uemura in the finals of an eight-team tournament to become the inaugural champions. New Japan Pro-Wrestling recognizes this reign as beginning on August 13, 2022, when the match aired on tape delay.	
2	The Motor City Machine Guns (Alex Shelley and Chris Sabin)	October 28, 2022	Rumble on 44th Street	New York, NY	1	169	169	3	This was a three-way tag team match, which also involved The DKC and Kevin Knight.	
3	Aussie Open (Kyle Fletcher and Mark Davis)	April 15, 2023	Capital Collision	Washington, D.C.	2	36	36	1	This was a three-way tag team match, which also involved Dream Team (Hiroshi Tanahashi and Kazuchika Okada).	
—	Vacated	May 21, 2023	Resurgence	Long Beach, CA	—	—	—	—	Kyle Fletcher vacated the Strong and the IWGP Tag Team Championship after Mark Davis suffered an injury.	
4	Bishamon (Hirooki Goto and Yoshi-Hashi)	June 4, 2023	Dominion 6.4 in Osaka-jo Hall	Chūō-ku, Osaka	1	30	30	0	Defeated House of Torture (Evil and Yujiro Takahashi) and United Empire (Great-O-Khan and Aaron Henare) in a three-way tag team match to win the vacant titles. The match was also disputed for the vacant IWGP Tag Team Championship.	
5	Bullet Club War Dogs (Alex Coughlin and Gabe Kidd)	July 4, 2023	Independence Day; Night 1	Bunkyo, Tokyo	1	97	97	0		
6	Guerrillas of Destiny (Hikuleo and El Phantasmo)	October 9, 2023	Destruction in Ryōgoku	Sumida, Tokyo	1	186	186	5		
7	TMDK (Mikey Nicholls and Shane Haste)	April 12, 2024	Windy City Riot	Chicago, IL	1	29	29	1	This was a four-corners tag team match also involving Fred Rosser and Tom Lawlor and West Coast Wrecking Crew (Royce Isaacs and Jorel Nelson).	
8	Guerrillas of Destiny (Hikuleo and El Phantasmo)	May 11, 2024	Resurgence	Ontario, CA	2	29	29	0		
9	TMDK (Mikey Nicholls and Shane Haste)	June 9, 2024	Dominion 6.9 in Osaka-jo Hall	Chūō-ku, Osaka	2	152	152	2	This was a four-way tornado tag team elimination Winners Take All match also disputed for the IWGP Tag Team Championship which also involved the teams of Bullet Club (Kenta and Chase Owens) and Bishamon (Hirooki Goto and Yoshi-Hashi).	
10	Grizzled Young Veterans (James Drake and Zack Gibson)	November 8, 2024	Fighting Spirit Unleashed	Lowell, MA	1	37	37	1		
11	World Class Wrecking Crew (Royce Isaacs and Jorel Nelson)	December 15, 2024	Strong Style Evolved	Long Beach, CA	1	145	145	2		
12	United Empire (TJP and Templario)	May 9, 2025	Resurgence	Ontario, CA	1	189	189	2		
13	Los Hermanos Chávez (Ángel de Oro and Niebla Roja)	November 14, 2025	Viernes Espectacular	Cuauhtémoc, Mexico City	1	367	367	2	This was a CMLL event.	
14	Unbound Co. (Titán and Taiji Ishimori)	November 16, 2026	Lucha Kingdom	Cuauhtémoc, Mexico City	1	4+	4+	0		

== Combined reigns ==
As of November 20, 2026.

†	Indicates the current champions

=== By team ===
Rank	Team	No. of reigns	Combined defenses	Combined days	Combined days rec. by NJPW
1	Los Hermanos Chávez (Ángel de Oro and Niebla Roja)	1	2	367	
2	Guerrillas of Destiny (Hikuleo and El Phantasmo)	2	5	215	
3	United Empire (TJP and Templario)	1	2	189	
4	TMDK (Mikey Nicholls and Shane Haste)	2	3	181	
5	The Motor City Machine Guns (Alex Shelley and Chris Sabin)	1	3	169	
6	World Class Wrecking Crew (Royce Isaacs and Jorel Nelson)	1	2	145	
7	Aussie Open (Kyle Fletcher and Mark Davis)	2	4	132	112
8	Bullet Club War Dogs (Alex Coughlin and Gabe Kidd)	1	0	97	
9	Grizzled Young Veterans (James Drake and Zack Gibson)	1	1	37	
10	Bishamon (Hirooki Goto and Yoshi-Hashi)	1	0	30	
11	Unbound Co. † (Titán and Taiji Ishimori)	1	0	4+	

=== By wrestler ===
Rank	Wrestler	No. of reigns	Combined defenses	Combined days	Combined days rec. by NJPW
1	Ángel de Oro	1	2	367	
1	Niebla Roja	1	2	367	
3	Hikuleo	2	5	215	
3	El Phantasmo	2	5	215	
5	TJP	1	2	189	
5	Templario	1	2	189	
7	Mikey Nicholls	2	3	181	
7	Shane Haste	2	3	181	
9	Alex Shelley	1	3	169	
9	Chris Sabin	1	3	169	
11	Royce Isaacs	1	2	145	
11	Jorel Nelson	1	2	145	
13	Kyle Fletcher	2	4	132	112
13	Mark Davis	2	4	132	112
15	Alex Coughlin	1	0	97	
15	Gabe Kidd	1	0	97	
17	James Drake	1	1	37	
17	Zack Gibson	1	1	37	
19	Hirooki Goto	1	0	30	
19	Yoshi-Hashi	1	0	30	
21	Titán †	1	0	4+	
21	Taiji Ishimori †	1	0	4+	
