= Jorel Nelson =

American professional wrestler

Personal information
- Born: Jorel Nelson; May 17, 1992 (age 34) Seattle, Washington, United States

Professional wrestling career
- Ring name(s): Jorel Nelson; The Greatest Show
- Billed height: 183 cm (6 ft 0 in)
- Billed weight: 95 kg (209 lb)
- Billed from: Panama City, Florida; Anaheim, California
- Trained by: Tulalip Championship Wrestling; Buddy Wayne
- Debut: November 26, 2011

Jorel Nelson (born May 17, 1992) is an American professional wrestler, signed to New Japan Pro-Wrestling (NJPW), where he was a former member of Team Filthy. He also makes appearances on the independent circuit. He was named after the character Jor-El from DC Comics' Superman franchise.

== Professional wrestling career ==
=== Early career ===
Nelson was scouted by wrestler Aaron Bolo to pursue professional wrestling after seeing Nelson at several local independent shows. He started his training at Tulalip Championship Wrestling in Marysville, Washington under the tutelage of Bolo, Ethan H. D., Mike Santiago, Kellen Raeth, Damon James, and Caden Mathews. He furthered his training by attending the Buddy Wayne Academy in Everett, Washington. In addition to TCW, Nelson would regally wrestle for Don't Own Anyone Pro Wrestling in Portland, Oregon and West Coast Wrestling Connection in Salem, Oregon.

Nelson would start to wrestle for promotions in Southern California in 2016. He would also receive several interactions with WWE. In October 2012, Nelson attended a WWE Tryout Camp in Tampa, Florida. On August 8, 2016, Nelson made his first WWE appearance in a loss against Braun Strowman on WWE Raw. The next night, Nelson faced Kane in a dark match for WWE Main Event in Bakersfield.

=== Empire Wrestling Federation (2016-2018) ===
The "Greatest Show in the Ring" Jorel Nelson had his first match with Empire Wrestling Federation on March 12, 2016, against the "Mega King" Tommy Wilson. During his first year, Nelson became a two-time EWF American Heavyweight Champion. His first reign begun after he defeated Anthony Idol at a private EWF event. He would lose the title lose the title to Wilson in September before regaining it at another private event. His second title reign would come to an end when he was defeated by Idol at The Big Event on October 16, 2016.

Nelson became EWF Tag Team Champions with Davion Foreman on December 1, 2017, after defeating H.A.T.E. (Che Cabrera and Rico Dynamite). Nelson and Foreman would hold the titles until April 6, 2018, in a loss to Calder McColl and Dr. Kruger. The team parted ways with Nelson putting his focus now on singles competition. Turning heel, Nelson targeted the EWF Heavyweight Champion, Andy Brown. Nelson and Brown fight on July 6, 2018, to a No Contest.

Frustrated by being cheated by "Friar" Juan Roman in their matches and teaming with Foreman in the tag team division, Nelson stole Brown title belt and renamed himself just The Greatest Show. In their rematch on August 31, 2018, the Greatest Show would lose definitively to Brown for the Heavyweight Title. Nelson would leave the promotion after his final match with Richie Slade at Jingle Slam 9 on December 12, 2018.

=== New Japan Pro Wrestling (2021–present) ===
On May 7, 2021, Nelson made his New Japan Pro-Wrestling debut during NJPW Strong's. Known as the West Coast Wrecking Crew, he defeated Jordan Clearwater and Misterioso with his tag team partner, Royce Isaacs. During the first week of Strong's version of the Summer Struggle event, Isaacs and Nelson were defeated by Danny Limelight and J. R. Kratos of Team Filthy. Despite the West Coast Wrecking Crew's loss, Team Filthy's leader "Filthy" Tom Lawlor liked what he saw out of them. He asked if they wanted to join Team Filthy and Isaacs and Nelson accepted. The West Coast Wrecking Crew would prove themselves to be consistent challengers for the Strong Openweight Tag Team Championships facing challengers like the Motor City Machine Guns, TMDK, Aussie Open, and the Guerrillas of Destiny (Hikuleo, and El Phantasmo).

=== All Elite Wrestling/Ring of Honor (2021, 2023) ===
Isaacs has participated on several All Elite Wrestling programs. He debuted as one half of the West Coast Wrecking Crew with Isaacs against the Varsity Blondes (Griff Garrison and Brian Pillman Jr.) on the March 10, 2021 edition of AEW Dark. Nelson debuted for Ring of Honor on November 11, 2023, with Isaacs in a four-way tag team match against the WorkHorsemen (Anthony Henry & JD Drake) defeat the Infantry (Carlie Bravo & Shawn Dean) and Iron Savages (Boulder & Bronson) on Honor Club.

== Filmography ==
=== Television ===
Year	Title	Role	Notes
2021	B Positive	Trainer	"Canine Extraction"

== Championships and accomplishments ==
- DEFY Wrestling
  - DEFY Tag Team Championship (1 time) – with Royce Isaacs
- Empire Wrestling Federation
  - EWF American Heavyweight Championship (2 times)
  - EWF Tag Team Championship (1 time) – with Davion Foreman
- Don't Own Anyone Pro Wrestling
  - DOA Pure Heavyweight Championship (1 time)
- Future Stars of Wrestling
  - FSW Tag Team Championship (2 times) – with Royce Isaacs
- New Japan Pro-Wrestling
  - Strong Openweight Tag Team Championship (1 time) – with Royce Isaacs
- Winner's Circle Pro-Wrestling
  - WCPW Tag Team Championship (1 time) – with Royce Isaacs
