= Royce Isaacs =

American professional wrestler (born 1989)

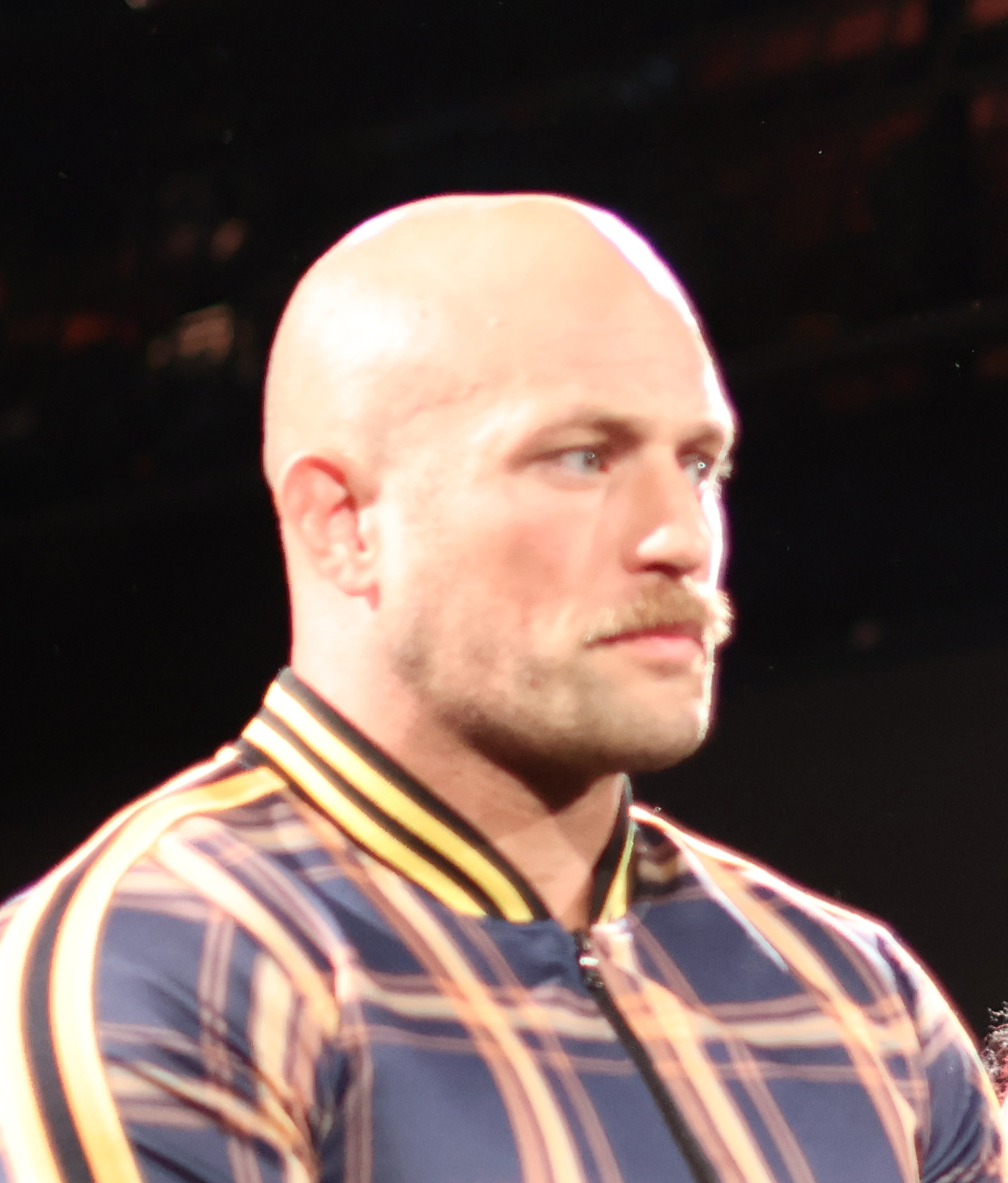
- Isaacs in November 2024

Personal information
- Born: Isaac Hull; February 8, 1989 (age 37) Denver, Colorado, U.S.
- Website: royceisaacs.wixsite.com/isaacs

Professional wrestling career
- Ring name(s): Royce Isaacs; Royce Isaac$ Mr. Burbank
- Billed height: 185 cm (6 ft 1 in)
- Billed weight: 110 kg (243 lb)
- Billed from: The Mile High City; Los Angeles, California
- Trained by: Lonnie Valdez
- Debut: June 2014

Isaac Hull (born February 8, 1989) is an American professional wrestler, better known by his ring name Royce Isaacs. He is signed to New Japan Pro-Wrestling and a former member of Team Filthy. He also is known for his work in DDT Pro-Wrestling (DDT), Championship Wrestling from Hollywood and the National Wrestling Alliance (NWA) where he was staying from 2019 until 2020 and former one-time NWA World Tag Team Champion.

== Professional wrestling career ==
=== Early career ===
Hull received his training at the Butcher Shop in Westminster, Colorado from his trainer, Lonnie Valdez. He wrestled primarily for independent wrestling promotions in Colorado before expanding his opportunities by wrestling in promotions throughout the US.

=== DDT Pro-Wrestling (2016–2017) ===
Royce Isaacs debuted with DDT taking part in their DNA Grand Prix 2016 round-robin tournament. In 2017, he did three additional tours with the promotion, usually where he was a tag team partner of Danshoku Dino. At Who's Gonna Top? DDT Dramatic General Election 2017 ~ Last Request Special! Isaacs became the Ironman Heavymetalweight Champion after taking the title off a pair of chopsticks before losing the title in a Gauntlet Battle Royal before the end of the show.

=== Championship Wrestling From Hollywood (2017–2020) ===
Royce Isaacs debuted for Championship Wrestling from Hollywood as a participant for their PP3 Memorial Cup tournament in 2017. In 2018 Isaacs aligned with manager, Jamie Iovine to become UWN Television Champion and the Hollywood Heritage Heavyweight Champion simultaneously. During this time, Isaac entered feuds with Bateman and Andy Brown for these titles causing him to lose the Heritage title to Brown in 2018 and the TV title to Bateman at the 2019 Coastline Clash. At the 2019 Red Carpet Rumble, Isaacs would become a 2-time UWN TV Champion after defeating the then champion, Scorpio Sky and Bateman. Isaac's last match for Championship Wrestling was a loss to Dan Joseph for the UWN TV title.

=== National Wrestling Alliance (2019–2020) ===
Royce Isaacs took part in the 2019 Crockett Cup with his tag team partner, Thom Latimer. The pair won a qualifying tag team battle royal for an open spot in the tournament for the vacant NWA World Tag Team Championships. They progressed through the first round against the War Kings (Crimson and Jax Dane) and defeated Bandido and Flip Gordon in the semi-finals. Isaac and Latimer fell to Villain Enterprises (Brody King and PCO) in the final. During Global Wars Espectacular on 7 September 2019, Latimer and Isaacs defeated Villain Enterprises in a re-match from the Crocket Cup finals. On the December 17 episode of Powerrr, Isaacs and Latimer were revealed to being aligned with the NWA Worlds Heavyweight Champion, Nick Aldis and his "insurance policy", Kamille. Isaac's and Latimer's tag team would be named the Wild Cards and the alliance between them, Aldis, Kamille and, eventually, Isaacs' on-screen girlfriend May Valentine would be named Strickly Business. During the ninth episode of Powerrr, the Wild Cards would lose their tag team titles to the Rock 'n' Roll Express. With the COVID-19 pandemic halting tapings of NWA programing, Isaacs asked for his release in September 2020.

=== Ring of Honor (2019, 2023) ===
Isaacs appeared for Ring of Honor in 2019 with Latimer as part of the Crockett Cup tournament. He returned to the promotion with Jorel Nelson on November 11, 2023, in a four-way tag team match against the WorkHorsemen (Anthony Henry & JD Drake) defeat the Infantry (Carlie Bravo & Shawn Dean) and Iron Savages (Boulder & Bronson) on Honor Club.

=== New Japan Pro Wrestling (2021–present) ===
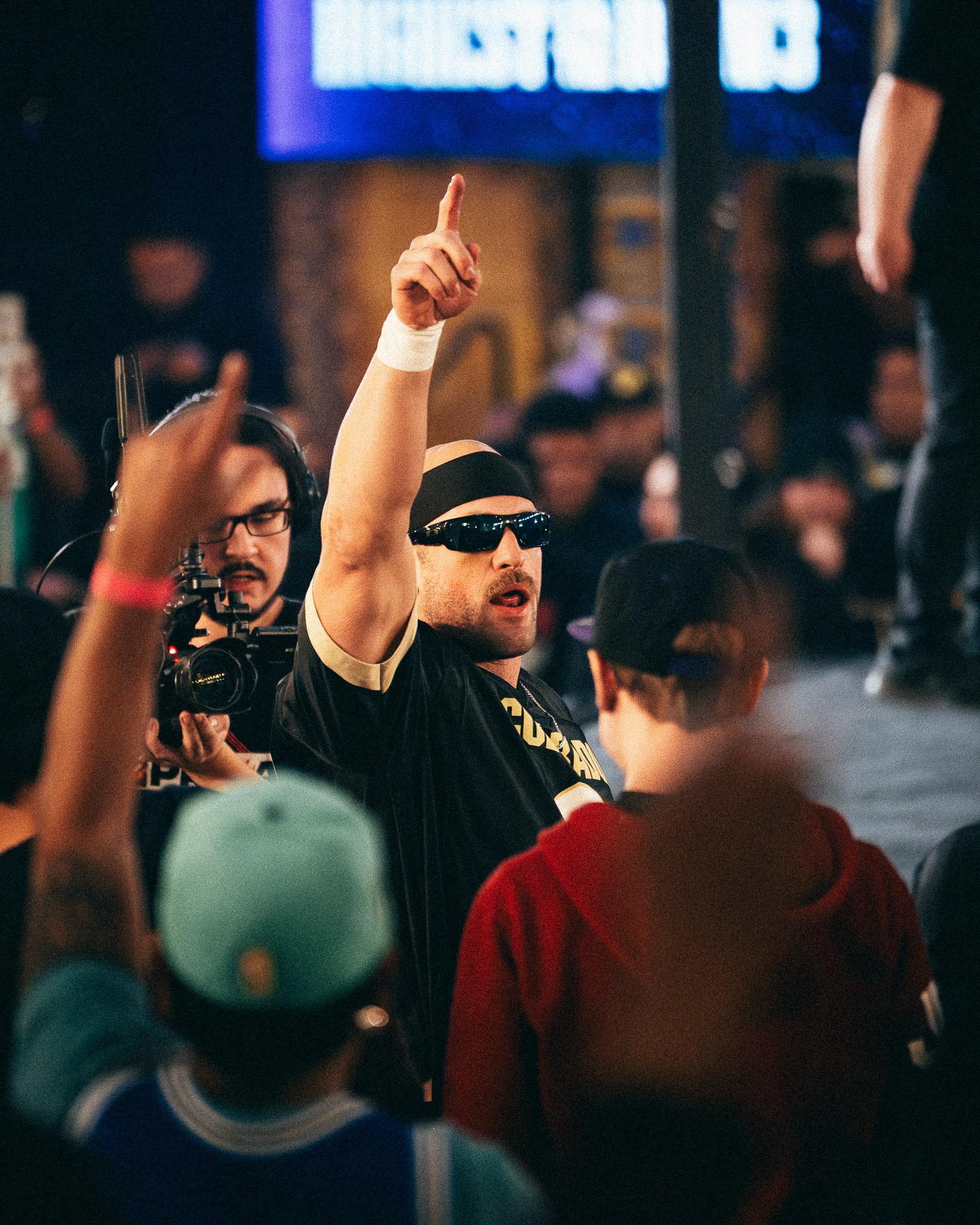
Isaacs at a Game Changer Wrestling event in 2024.

Isaacs made his New Japan Pro-Wrestling debut on the Collision event for NJPW Strong on May 7, 2021. Known as the West Coast Wrecking Crew, he, and his tag team partner Jorel Nelson, were victorious over Jordan Clearwater and Misterioso. During the first week of Strong's version of the Summer Struggle event, Isaacs and Nelson were defeated by Danny Limelight and J. R. Kratos of Team Filthy. Despite the West Coast Wrecking Crew's loss, Team Filthy's leader "Filthy" Tom Lawlor liked what he saw out of them. He asked if they wanted to join Team Filthy and Isaacs and Nelson accepted. The West Coast Wrecking crew would prove themselves to be consistent challengers for the Strong Openweight Tag Team Championships facing challengers like the Motor City Machine Guns, TMDK, Aussie Open, and the Guerrillas of Destiny (Hikuleo, and El Phantasmo). In addition, Isaacs would second Lawlor during the G1 Climax 32 tournament in preliminary tag team matches. With Nelson, Lawlor, and Kratos would appear at the NJPW Independence Day events at Korakuen Hall.

=== All Elite Wrestling (2021, 2023) ===
Isaacs has wrestled for several programs under the All Elite Wrestling umbrella. He debuted as one half of the West Coast Wrecking Crew with Nelson against the Varsity Blondes (Griff Garrison and Brian Pillman Jr.) on the March 10, 2021 edition of AEW Dark. Isaacs would have a singles match with Ren Narita on the May 13, 2021 of AEW Dark: Elevation.

Isaacs' televised AEW debut happened when Maxwell Jacob Friedman had him and Lawlor attack Adam Cole on the June 23, 2023 edition of AEW Rampage prior to Cole and Lawlor's planned match at that year's Forbidden Door (which couldn't take place due to Cole becoming ill before the event).

== Personal life ==
Isaacs is Jewish.

== Championships and accomplishments ==
- DDT Pro-Wrestling
  - Ironman Heavymetalweight Championship (1 time)
- DEFY Wrestling
  - DEFY Tag Team Championship (1 time) – with Jorel Nelson
- Epic Pro Wrestling
  - Epic Pro Championship (1 time, current)
- Future Stars of Wrestling
  - FSW Tag Team Championship (2 times) – with Jorel Nelson
- Lucha Libre & Laughs
  - LLL Heavyweight Championship (3 times)
- National Wrestling Alliance
  - NWA World Tag Team Championship (1 time) – with Thom Latimer
- New Japan Pro-Wrestling
  - Strong Openweight Tag Team Championship (1 time) – with Jorel Nelson
- Primo Pro Wrestling
  - Primo Championship (1 time)
- Pro Wrestling Illustrated
  - Ranked No. 183 of the top 500 singles wrestlers in the PWI 500 in 2024
- Relentless Wrestling
  - Relentless Heavyweight Championship (1 time)
- United Wrestling Network
  - CWFH Heritage Heavyweight Championship (1 time)
  - UWN Television Championship (2 times)
- Winner's Circle Pro-Wrestling
  - WCPW Tag Team Championship (1 time) – with Jorel Nelson
- Wrestling's Best of the West
  - BOTW Tag Team Championship (1 time) – with Jorel Nelson
