= West Coast Wrecking Crew =

Professional wrestling tag team

Tag team
- Members: Royce Isaacs; Jorel Nelson
- Name(s): West Coast Wrecking Crew; World Class Wrecking Crew; The One Percent; The 1 Precenters
- Billed heights: Isaacs: 185cm Nelson: 183cm
- Combined billed weight: 205 kg (452 lb)
- Former members: MK; Martin Casaus
- Debut: 15 December 2017
- Years active: 2017–present

West Coast Wrecking Crew are an American professional wrestling tag team consisting of Royce Isaacs and Jorel Nelson, currently signed to New Japan Pro-Wrestling, where they are the former Strong Openweight Tag Team Champions They also currently work for DEFY Wrestling, Deadlock Pro-Wrestling, Future Stars of Wrestling, and several independent wrestling organizations in Southern California. The pair has also made appearances on All Elite Wrestling and its sister promotion, Ring of Honor, Pro Wrestling Guerrilla, and Hoodslam.

The two first teamed up in 2017 under their original name, The One Percent (which was sometimes stylized as One %ercent, 1 Percent, and 1%).

== History ==
=== Early career (2011–2017) ===
Nelson was scouted by a wrestler to train and start his career in the Washington's independent wrestling scene. Isaacs sought out training and work in Colorado's independent scene. Both sought out more opportunities in the wrestling business and opted to wrestle for promotions in Southern California.

=== The One Percent (2017–2019) ===
During the 30 Man Rumble at Future Stars of Wrestling's 2017 Against All Odds in Las Vegas, Isaacs and Nelson aided each other throughout the match until Nelson was eliminated. After this, the two would form a tag team called the One Percent. They would be joined by Martin Casaus as a member for one match. Isaacs and Nelson would capture their first FSW Tag Team Championship win against the Bonus Boyz at High Octane on April 14, 2018. With FSW, the One Percent would gain a manager in MK and hold the FSW Tag Team titles once more after losing and regaining them from the Bag Boyz (Chris Bey and Suede Thompson).

Around this time, One Percent would be featured in WGN America's wrestling show, Ring Warriors in 2018. They were also one time BOTW Tag Team Champions for Wrestling's Best of the West from 2018 to 2019.

Nelson and Isaacs made their successful debut at DEFY Wrestling at City of Thorns on November 24, 2018, in Portland, Oregon against Carl Randers and Cody Chhun. At DEFY Never Dies the company's 2nd Anniversary Show in Seattle, Washington, the One Percent defeated the Amerikan Gunz (Ethan H. D. and Mike Santiago) for the DEFY Tag Team Championship titles. They would hold on to the titles until March 29, 2019 where they would be defeated by PCW Ultra's Ultra Tag Team Champions, Warbeast (Fatu and Josef) in a Winner Takes All Three WayTag Team match at PCW Ultra Wrestle Summit also featuring Sent2Slaughter (Dan Maff and Shawn Donavan).

== Championships and accomplishments ==
- DEFY Wrestling
  - DEFY Tag Team Championship (1 time)
- Future Stars Of Wrestling
  - FSW Tag Team Championship (2 times)
- New Japan Pro-Wrestling
  - Strong Openweight Tag Team Championship (1 time)
- Winner's Circle Pro-Wrestling
  - WCPW Tag Team Championship (1 time)
- Wrestling's Best of the West
  - BOTW Tag Team Championship (1 time)
