= Commonwealth Cup (professional wrestling) =

The Commonwealth Cup is an annual independent wrestling tournament in North America, run and promoted by Virginia-based promotion NOVA Pro Wrestling. The first tournament took place in 2017, and serves as the highest honor in the promotion, as there are no official championships in NOVA Pro at the present time.

== Format ==
The first year of the Commonwealth Cup, in 2017, consisted of 12 participants, with six opening round singles matches, two three-way elimination semifinal matches, and a one-on-one tournament final. In 2018, the men's tournament was expanded to 16 participants, with eight opening round singles matches, four second round singles matches, and one four-way elimination final.

In 2018, the Commonwealth Cup featured its first women's tournament. The tournament was an 8-woman single-elimination format.

== List of winners ==
- 2017: Logan Easton Laroux
- 2018 Men's: Wheeler YUTA
- 2018 Women's: Jordynne Grace

== Results ==
=== 2017 ===
The first annual Commonwealth Cup was held on April 14, 2017, in Fairfax, Virginia.

Quarterfinals
Logan Easton LaRoux	Pin
David Starr	7:16
John Kermon	Sub
Tracy Williams	13:40
Alex Daniels	7:06
Chet Sterling	Pin
Logan Easton LaRoux	Pin
David Starr	7:16
John Kermon	Sub
Tracy Williams	13:40
Alex Daniels	7:06
Chet Sterling	Pin

Semifinals
Logan Easton LaRoux	Win
John Kermon	8:01
Chet Sterling	8:37
Logan Easton LaRoux	Win
John Kermon	8:01
Chet Sterling	8:37

Final
Logan Easton Laroux	Pin
Arik Royal	6:25

Both semifinal matches were elimination matches. Sterling pinned Kermon, then LaRoux pinned Sterling, in Semifinal 1. In Semifinal 2, Shields pinned Donst, then Royal pinned Shields.

=== 2018 men's ===
The 2018 men's Commonwealth Cup was held on June 8 & 9, 2018 in Fairfax, Virginia.

Opening Round, June 8
Logan Easton LaRoux	11:39
Arik Royal	Pin
Nick Gage	10:12
P.C.O.	Pin
Curt Stallion	12:04
Tracy Williams	Pin
Fred Yehi	TKO
Tim Donst	15:04
Dominic Garrini	Pin
Jonathan Gresham	12:20
Sage Phillips	Pin
Jimmy Jacobs	12:28
Beau Crockett	11:34
Homicide	Sub
Alexander James	12:50
Wheeler YUTA	Sub

Second Round, June 9
Arik Royal	Pin
P.C.O.	10:04
Tracy Williams	Pin
Fred Yehi	10:22
Dominic Garrini	5:48
Sage Phillips	Pin
Homicide	8:24
Wheeler YUTA	Pin

Four-Way Final, June 9
Arik Royal	Final
Tracy Williams	5:17
Sage Phillips	9:13
Wheeler YUTA	Final

Final Decision, June 9
Arik Royal	15:44
Wheeler YUTA	Sub

Note on the Semis/Finals: The final four squared off in a four corners elimination match for the Commonwealth Cup. Times listed are the times of elimination. Royal pinned Williams; Royal pinned Phillips; YUTA made Royal submit.

=== 2018 women's ===
The 2018 women's Commonwealth Cup will be held on June 9, 2018, in Fairfax, Virginia.

Announced participants

Wrestler	Qualified over	Show announced at
Jordynne Grace	Isla Dawn & Laynie Luck	Cupid's Chokehold
Faye Jackson	Terra Calaway	Rip Her To Shreds
Mia Yim	Invited	Rip Her To Shreds
Veda Scott	FaceBrooke & Jordan Blade	Old Dominion Rumble
Rachael Ellering	Invited	Old Dominion Rumble
Angelus Layne	Result of a Deal With the Devil	On Twitter before Threat of Joy
Allie Kat	Solo Darling	Threat of Joy
Barbi Hayden	injury replacement	On Twitter before the Cup

Note: If two names are listed in the "Qualified over" column, the person won a triple threat to qualify.

The Deal With the Devil: Angelus Layne was allowed to skip qualification and enter the Women's Commonwealth Cup after injury kept her from competing; however, in doing so, she agreed to put her NOVA Pro career on the line in her first-round match.

Tournament Results

Quarterfinals
Faye Jackson	9:21
Mia Yim	Sub
Rachael Ellering	8:47
Jordynne Grace	Pin
Allie Kat	Pin
Veda Scott	9:08
Angelus Layne	Pin
Barbi Hayden	7:29

Semifinals
Mia Yim	8:21
Jordynne Grace	Pin
Allie Kat	DQ
Angelus Layne	11:53

Finals
Jordynne Grace	Sub
Allie Kat	11:32

=== 2019 men's ===
The following wrestlers will take part in the 2019 Men's Commonwealth Cup. If the wrestler entered the tournament via qualifier, the opponent(s) he beat are noted.

- Daniel Makabe
- Slim J
- Shotzi Blackheart or Tripp Cassidy (qualified over Eddy Only, Innocent Isaiah, John Kermon, Mikey Banker, and Steve Manders)
- Anthony Greene (qualified over Tim Donst)
- Winner Of: Cabana Man Dan vs. Josh Briggs

NOTE: Tripp Cassidy could not make his qualifier, but nominated Blackheart to represent him in the match. When Blackheart won, there was controversy over who officially qualified.

=== 2019 women's ===
The following wrestlers will take part in the 2019 Women's Commonwealth Cup. If the wrestler entered the tournament via qualifier, the opponent(s) she beat are noted.

- Rain
- Shazza McKenzie
- Winner Of: Kasey Catal vs. Quinn McKay vs. Gemma Cross vs. ??? vs. ??? vs. ???

== See also ==
- List of independent wrestling promotions in the United States
- Independent wrestling
