= NOVA Pro Wrestling =

American independent professional wrestling promotion

- Acronym: NOVA Pro
- Founded: 2015
- Defunct: 2019
- Style: Professional wrestling Sports entertainment
- Headquarters: Northern Virginia
- Founder(s): Mike King Jr. Mike E. King
- Website: Twitter; Tickets

NOVA Pro Wrestling (often referred to as simply NOVA Pro) was an American professional wrestling promotion that was established in 2015 based in Northern Virginia. The company's name came from the abbreviation of its location, Northern Virginia ("NoVa"). The promotion was founded by Mike King Jr., and his son, Mike E. King, with the intention to showcase the top independent wrestlers of Virginia, Maryland, and the general Mid-Atlantic region, as well as bring some of independent wrestling's popular names to the Northern Virginia area. The debut show, titled "The NOVA Project", took place on September 25, 2015 in Fairfax, Virginia. The promotion closed its doors in early 2019

== History ==
NOVA Pro Wrestling began on Friday, September 25, 2015, with its first show, "The NOVA Project", taking place at the Jewish Community Center of Northern Virginia, in Fairfax. The event was presented by the Virginia promotion Ground Xero Wrestling (GXW), and was run using their promoter's license and much of their equipment. The first show, casually referred to as a pilot episode, was considered a borderline success, despite several last minute changes to the card. This was primarily due to issues related to Virginia's licensing committee, as the show took place with only one of the originally advertised matches taking place as planned.

NOVA Pro waited until the new year to run again, this time with their own promoter's license. The first show of 2016, titled "Stay Vicious", ran on Sunday, January 31, 2016, from the Annandale Sports Center in Springfield, Virginia. The promotion would continue to run, both in Springfield and Fairfax, every other month until July, when the frequency increased to monthly shows, as the crowds continued to grow. The company celebrated their one-year anniversary with "The NOVA Project 2" on September 16, 2016, which featured the first steel cage match in the promotion's history, capping off a year-long feud between Sonjay Dutt and Logan Easton Laroux. The last show of the calendar year took place on Black Friday, November 25, 2016, and featured one of the last independent wrestling appearances of Chris Hero before his second stint with the WWE.

2017 began for NOVA Pro Wrestling, with "RELoad" on Friday, February 17, 2017 drawing one of its biggest crowds at a brand new venue, the Annandale Volunteer Fire Department in Annandale, Virginia. This location would split time with the original Fairfax location for the year, with NOVA's return to Fairfax hosting the first ever Commonwealth Cup on Friday, April 14, 2017. The one-night, 12-man tournament was won by Logan Easton Laroux, and was made even more significant by his win in the finals over Arik Royal, who had previously been undefeated in NOVA Pro since its inception in 2015.

2017 continued to be a year of firsts for NOVA Pro, as the company slowly discovered its identity. June 10, 2017 featured the first ever tryout show, "Life Is Like A Box of Chocolates", with a full NOVA Pro show, "Hi Fidelity", later that evening as well. The show "American Slang '17", on July 14, was main evented by NOVA's first ever ladder match, between PWI Ultra J Champion Chet Sterling and Logan Easton Laroux. "Cool for the Summer", on August 18, 2017, marked the company's first ever sold-out crowd, and was headlined by a No Disqualification intergender match between Angelus Layne and Keith Lee. This match came about as the focal point of a feud between Layne and promoter Mike E. King, after Layne threw a fireball at the promoter's face one month earlier. Lee was brought in to face Layne in the first intergender main event, though not the first or only instance of intergender wrestling in the promotion's history.

Friday, September 22, 2017 marked a second consecutive sell-out crowd, this time in the larger Fairfax venue, for "The NOVA Project 3". As the promotion entered its third year of operation, it enjoyed significant growth in exposure thanks to features in The Washington Post and Washington City Paper, as well as many national outlets, in part thanks to appearances from viral sensation "The Progressive Liberal" Daniel Richards. Around this time, the promotion signed with streaming service Powerbomb.TV to make past shows available on the site, and announce their first live-streamed show on Thursday, December 28, 2017, main evented by Powerbomb TV Independent Champion Jonathan Gresham defending against Sonjay Dutt.

In June 2018, NOVA Pro produced both a men's and women's Commonwealth Cup, although the early rounds of the Women's Cup were not available live as the show was a matinee. In addition, in September, it was announced that NOVA Pro would do a show outside Virginia for the first time as the company would perform as part of WrestleMania 35 weekend.

== Events ==
=== 2015 ===
Event	Date	Venue	Location	Main event	Ref.
The NOVA Project	September 25, 2015	JCC of Northern Virginia	Fairfax, Virginia	Sonjay Dutt vs Logan Easton Laroux vs Tim Donst	

=== 2016 ===
Event	Date	Venue	Location	Main event	Ref.
Stay Vicious	January 31, 2016	Annandale Sports Club	Springfield, Virginia	Ethan Case vs. Sonjay Dutt, PWI Ultra J Championship	
Last Exit To Springfield	March 20, 2016	Annandale Sports Club	Springfield, Virginia	Sonjay Dutt vs. Logan Easton Laroux, No Holds Barred	
You Only Move Twice	May 6, 2016	JCC of Northern Virginia	Fairfax, Virginia	Sonjay Dutt & John Kermon vs. Logan Easton Laroux & The Reason	
American Slang	July 1, 2016	JCC of Northern Virginia	Fairfax, Virginia	Cedric Alexander vs. Chet Sterling, PWI Ultra J Championship	
One Crazy Summer	August 12, 2016	JCC of Northern Virginia	Fairfax, Virginia	Alexander James, Bobby Shields, & Logan Easton Laroux vs. Sonjay Dutt, John Kermon, & Sean Studd	
The NOVA Project 2	September 16, 2016	JCC of Northern Virginia	Fairfax, Virginia	Logan Easton Laroux vs. Sonjay Dutt, Steel Cage Match	
Saturdays of Thunder	October 22, 2016	Annandale Sports Club	Springfield, Virginia	Tim Donst vs. Brandon Day, I Quit Match	
Paradise By The Dashboard Light	November 25, 2016	JCC of Northern Virginia	Fairfax, Virginia	Arik Royal vs. Chris Hero	

=== 2017 ===
Event	Date	Venue	Location	Main event	Ref.
RELoad	February 17, 2017	Annandale Volunteer Fire Department	Annandale, Virginia	Chet Sterling vs. Logan Easton Laroux, PWI Ultra J Championship	
Great Expectations	March 10, 2017	Annandale Volunteer Fire Department	Annandale, Virginia	Sonjay Dutt vs. Trevor Lee	
Commonwealth Cup 2017	April 14, 2017	JCC of Northern Virginia	Fairfax, Virginia	Arik Royal vs. Logan Easton Laroux	
The Great Grapsy	May 19, 2017	JCC of Northern Virginia	Fairfax, Virginia	Cutie & The Beast vs. The Carnies, Street Fight	
Life Is Like A Box Of Chocolates	June 10, 2017	Annandale Volunteer Fire Department	Annandale, Virginia	Sugar Dunkerton vs. AC Hawkes	
Hi Fidelity	June 10, 2017	Annandale Volunteer Fire Department	Annandale, Virginia	Chet Sterling vs. Sonjay Dutt vs. Bobby Shields vs. Jean Jean LeBon, PWI Ultra J Championship	
American Slang '17	July 14, 2017	JCC of Northern Virginia	Fairfax, Virginia	Chet Sterling vs. Logan Easton Laroux, PWI Ultra J Championship, Ladder Match	
Cool For The Summer	August 18, 2017	Annandale Volunteer Fire Department	Annandale, Virginia	Angelus Layne vs. Keith Lee, No Disqualification	
NOVA Project 3	September 22, 2017	JCC of Northern Virginia	Fairfax, Virginia	Arik Royal vs. Logan Easton Laroux	
Pumpkin Spice Lariats	October 27, 2017	Annandale Volunteer Fire Department	Annandale, Virginia	DJ Z vs. Sonjay Dutt	
11th Dimension	November 24, 2017	JCC of Northern Virginia	Fairfax, Virginia	Faye Jackson, Mia Yim, Brittany Blake, LuFisto, & Jordynne Grace vs. Veda Scott, Deonna Purrazzo, Allie Kat, Laynie Luck, & Sahara Se7en, Elimination Tag Match	
Such Great Heights	December 28, 2017	Annandale Volunteer Fire Department	Annandale, Virginia	Jonathan Gresham vs. Sonjay Dutt, Powerbomb TV Independent Championship	

=== 2018 ===
Event	Date	Venue	Location	Main event	Ref.
Cupid's Chokehold	February 16, 2018	Annandale Volunteer Fire Department	Annandale, Virginia	Arik Royal vs Gunner Miller	
Sink Or Swim	March 10, 2018	Annandale Volunteer Fire Department	Annandale, Virginia	Tim Donst vs. Logan Easton LaRoux	
Rip Her To Shreds	March 10, 2018	Annandale Volunteer Fire Department	Annandale, Virginia	Angelus Layne vs. Rain	
Old Dominion Rumble	April 20, 2018	JCC of Northern Virginia	Fairfax, Virginia	The 30-entrant Rumble	
Threat of Joy	May 11, 2018	Annandale Volunteer Fire Department	Annandale, Virginia	Tracy Williams vs. Jonathan Gresham vs. Logan Easton LaRoux for the Powerbomb.TV Independent Wrestling Championship	
Commonwealth Cup 2018	June 8, 2018 - June 9, 2018	Annandale Volunteer Fire Department	Annandale, Virginia	Show #1: P.C.O. vs. Nick Gage in a men's first round match Show #2: Allie Kat vs. Angelus Layne in a women's semifinal Show #3: Sage Phillips vs. Wheeler Yuta vs. Arik Royal vs. Tracy Williams in the men's final four-way elimination match	
American Slang '18	July 6, 2018	JCC of Northern Virginia	Fairfax, Virginia	Wheeler Yuta vs. Homicide	
Harlem Nights	July 28, 2018	Elk's Lodge	Fairfax, Virginia	Tim Donst vs. Nick Gage in a Harlem Street Fight	
Summer of George	August 24, 2018	Annandale Volunteer Fire Department	Annandale, Virginia	TELEVISED: Wheeler YUTA and Tim Donst vs. Homicide and Nick Gage LIVE: Jonathan Gresham vs. Sage Philips	
NOVA Project 4	September 21, 2018	JCC of Northern Virginia	Fairfax, Virginia	Tracy Williams vs. Jordynne Grace for the Powerbomb TV Independent Championship	
Sadie Hawkins Invitational	October 19, 2018	Ananndale Volunteer Fire Department	Annandale, Virginia	Breaux Keller and Willow Nightingale vs. Veda Scott and Jason Cade vs. Arik Royal and Faye Jackson vs. Maxwell Jacob Friedman and Allie Kat, Sadie Hawkins Invitational finals elimination tag match	
Stay Gold, Ponyboy	November 23, 2018	JCC of Northern Virginia	Fairfax, Virginia	Logan Easton LaRoux, Travis Huckabee, Kevin Ku, Victor Benjamin, Jaxon Stone, Paul Jordane, Teddy King, and Beau Crockett vs. Lance Lude, Rob Killjoy, Arik Royal, John Kermon, Nick Iggy, Tripp Cassidy, Kerry Awful, and Innocent Isaiah in a Torneo Cibernetico	
Hoppy Place	December 15, 2018	Old Ox Brewery	Ashburn, Virginia	Logan Easton LaRoux vs. Allie Kat	
37 (In A Row?)	December 27, 2018	Ananndale Volunteer Fire Department	Annandale, Virginia	Terra Calaway vs. Brittany Blake, "Fans Bring the Weapons" match	

== Working relationships ==
In 2016, NOVA Pro Wrestling became a member of the governing body known as Pro Wrestling International, which included other promotions in the southeast and mid-Atlantic regions, such as CWF Mid-Atlantic and Premiere Wrestling Xperience. The relationship with PWI lasted for two years, and included title defenses of the Ultra J Championship. On January 7, 2018, in a tweet from the official account, NOVA Pro announced that they were no longer a member of Pro Wrestling International.

In August 2017, NOVA Pro announced that they had linked up with the streaming service Powerbomb TV, with a staggered rollout of the entire library of shows. On September 6, 2017, “The NOVA Project” marked NOVA Pro Wrestling's debut to the streaming service. Later that month, it was announced that the show “Such Great Heights” on December 28, 2017 would be the first ever live streamed event in the promotion's history. NOVA Pro has announced that they will continue to stream live on Powerbomb TV going forward.

== Championships ==
Unlike typical professional wrestling promotions, NOVA did not feature any Championships. It did however conduct a number of tournaments.

=== Other accomplishments ===
Accomplishment	Latest winner(s)	Date won	Location
Men's Commonwealth Cup	Wheeler YUTA	June 9, 2018	Annandale, Virginia
Women's Commonwealth Cup	Jordynne Grace	June 9, 2018	Annandale, Virginia
Old Dominion Rumble	Arik Royal	April 20, 2018	Fairfax, Virginia

== See also ==
- List of independent wrestling promotions in the United States
- Independent wrestling
