= Commonwealth Cup (disambiguation) =

The Commonwealth Cup is a trophy given to the winner of the annual American football game between the University of Virginia and Virginia Tech.

Commonwealth Cup may also refer to:

- Commonwealth Cup (horse race), a horse race run in Great Britain
- Commonwealth Cup (professional wrestling), a professional wrestling tournament run by Virginia independent promotion NOVA Pro Wrestling
- Commonwealth Cup (soccer rivalry), a soccer rivalry between Kentucky soccer clubs Lexington SC and Louisville City
- Commonwealth Classic, an annual basketball game between Boston College and the University of Massachusetts
- Commonwealth of Independent States Cup, an association football tournament for clubs mainly from the Commonwealth of Independent States
