= Wheeler Yuta =

American professional wrestler (born 1996)

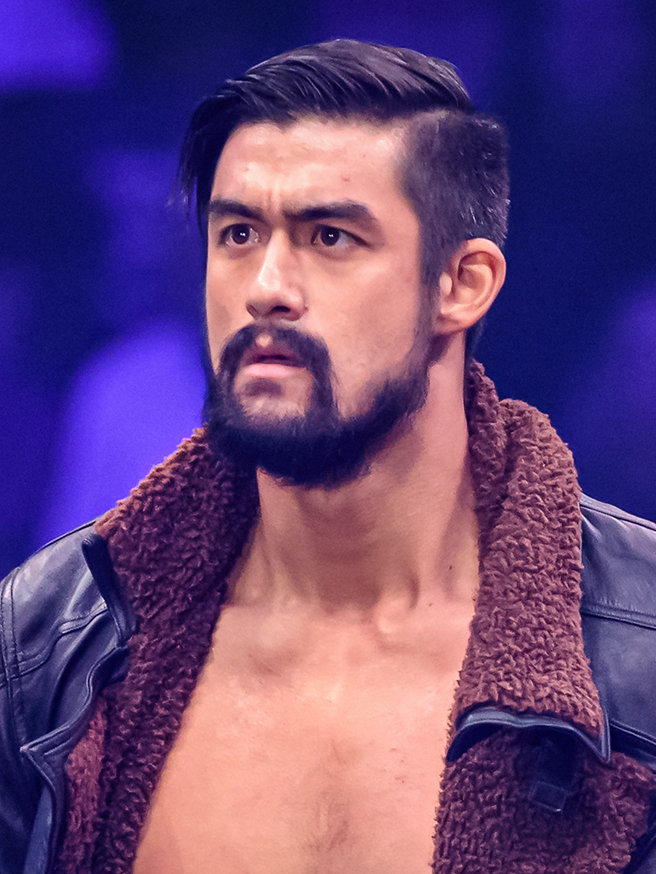
- Yuta in 2021

Personal information
- Born: Paul Soren Gruber; October 26, 1996 (age 30) Philadelphia, Pennsylvania, U.S.
- Education: Villanova University.

Professional wrestling career
- Ring name(s): Alex Kai; Hackman; Kabuki Ni; Jimmy Yuta; Sylverhawk; Wheeler Yuta; Wyldkat; Yuta
- Billed height: 6 ft 0 in (183 cm)
- Billed weight: 189 lb (86 kg)
- Trained by: AC Collins; Chuck Taylor; Drew Gulak; Mike Quackenbush; Orange Cassidy; Tracy Williams; World Famous CB
- Debut: 2014

Paul Soren Gruber (born October 26, 1996) is an American professional wrestler. He is signed to All Elite Wrestling (AEW), where he performs under the ring name Wheeler Yuta and is a member of the Death Riders stable. He is a former one-time AEW World Trios Champion. He also makes appearances for AEW's sister promotion Ring of Honor (ROH), where he is a former three-time ROH Pure Champion.

== Early life ==
Paul Soren Gruber was born in Philadelphia, Pennsylvania, on October 26, 1996, the son of a Japanese mother and an American father of German descent. His parents met while his father was on tour as a master chief petty officer in the U.S. Navy. He moved with his parents to South Carolina, where he graduated from Carolina Forest High School. The family then settled in Philadelphia, where he earned a degree from Villanova University.

== Professional wrestling career ==
=== Early career (2014–2020) ===
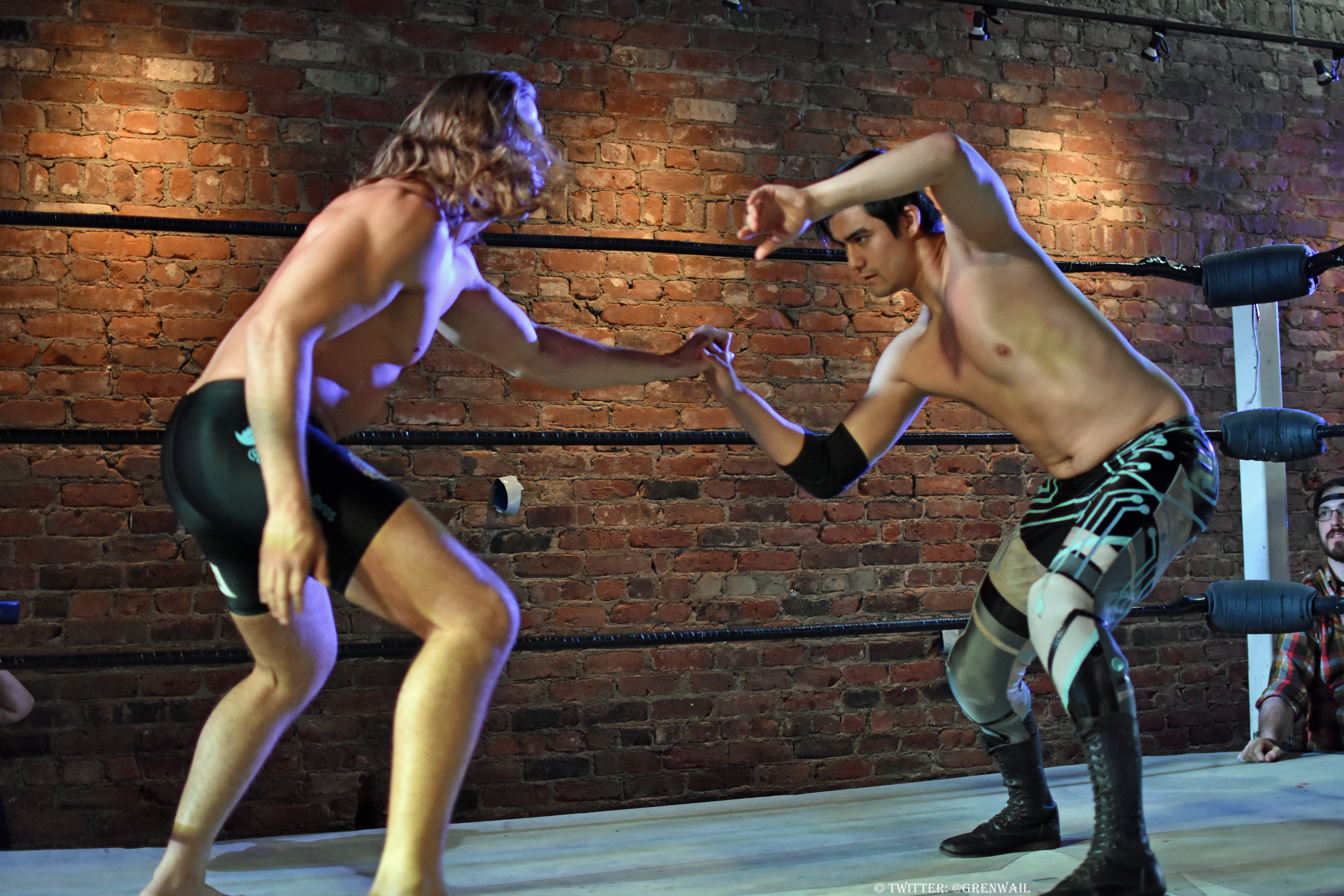
Yuta locks up with Matt Riddle during a match in 2018.

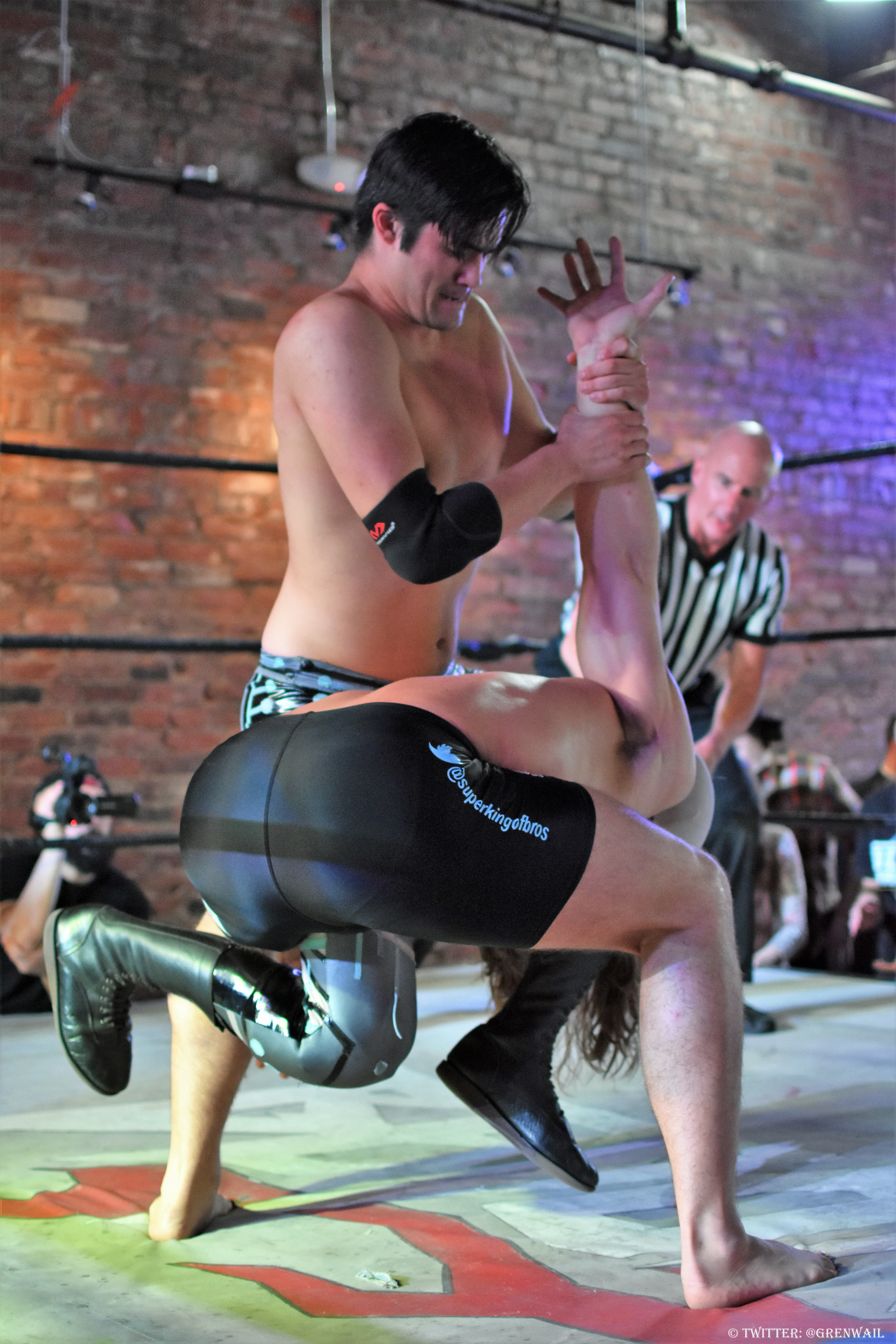
Yuta placing Riddle in an Octopus hold

Yuta debuted in 2014. He made his Combat Zone Wrestling (CZW) debut in late 2015 and consistently appeared for CZW until late 2016. On October 5, 2017, at One Shot, he made his debut for Major League Wrestling (MLW) in a losing effort to MJF. His last match for the promotion would be in 2019 against Low Ki. On September 11, 2020 episode of Ring of Honor Wrestling, Yuta made his debut for Ring of Honor (ROH) in the first round of the ROH Pure Tournament, where he was defeated by Jonathan Gresham. At Final Battle, Yuta teamed with Fred Yehi against The Foundation (Rhett Titus and Tracy Williams) in the first-ever Pure Rules tag team match. Yuta and Yehi lost the match.

=== All Elite Wrestling / Ring of Honor (2021–present) ===
==== Best Friends (2021–2022) ====
On the June 29, 2021 episode of Dark: Elevation, Yuta made his debut for All Elite Wrestling (AEW) against Karl Anderson, and would consistently appear on AEW's YouTube shows throughout the coming months. He also joined the Best Friends stable, filling in for the injured Trent Beretta in trios matches. On the November 10 episode of Dynamite, Rocky Romero announced that Best Friends would become a sub-group within the NJPW stable Chaos and would represent Chaos in AEW.

==== Blackpool Combat Club (2022–2024) ====
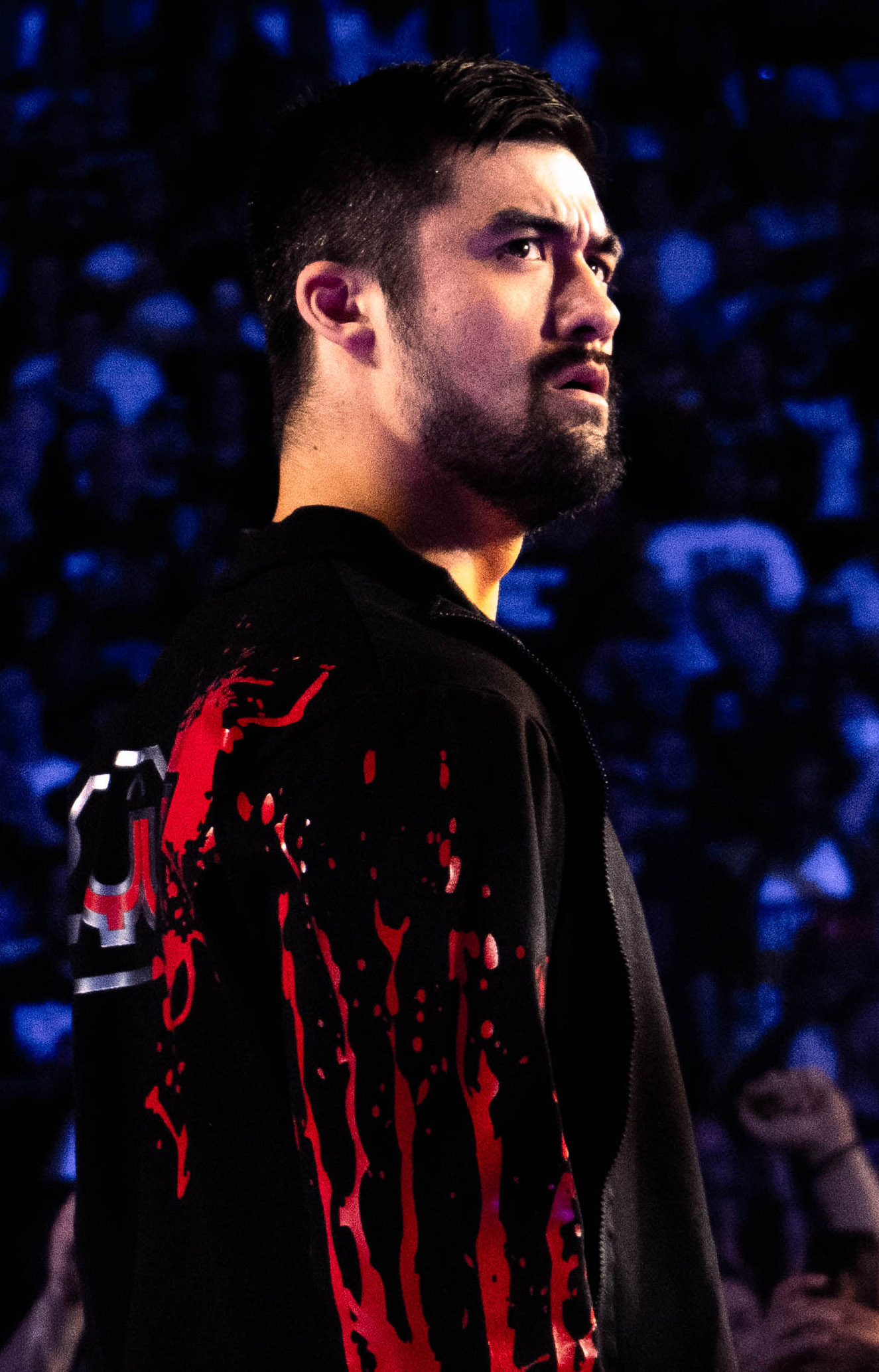
Yuta at AEW x NJPW: Forbidden Door in June 2022

After losing to Bryan Danielson on the March 30, 2022 episode of Dynamite, Yuta walked away from his Best Friends teammates and teased a potential alliance with Danielson's Blackpool Combat Club faction. After AEW owner Tony Khan's purchase of Ring of Honor (ROH), it was announced that Yuta would return to the promotion at the revived Supercard of Honor XV to challenge Josh Woods for the ROH Pure Championship. At the event, Yuta defeated Woods to win the title. On the April 8 episode of Rampage, Yuta was defeated by Blackpool Combat Club member Jon Moxley in a hard-fought match that saw him earn the group's respect. After the match, he was accepted into the group by its creator and then-manager William Regal. On the May 24, 2022 episode of Dark, which aired almost two months after their bout at Supercard of Honor XV, Yuta would successfully defend the ROH Pure Championship against Woods in a rematch. Yuta once again defended the title on the June 29 episode of Dark, defeating Tony Nese. After the match, Yuta was attacked by 2point0 and Daniel Garcia. This led to a match between Garcia and Yuta for the title at Death Before Dishonor, in which Yuta successfully retained the championship. Yuta lost the title on the September 7 episode of AEW Dynamite to Garcia, ending his reign at 159 days. On December 10, Yuta regained the ROH Pure Championship from Garcia at Final Battle, in turn becoming the first person to hold the title on multiple occasions.

On January 18, 2023 Yuta made his first title defense against Hagane Shinno at The Jay Briscoe Celebration of Life. Following the start of ROH programming on Honor Club, Yuta successfully defended the title against Timothy Thatcher. After the match, Yuta called out the NJPW LA Dojo, causing dojo graduate Clark Connors to confront Yuta seeking a title shot, which Yuta granted. The following week, Yuta defeated Connors to retain the Pure title. Post-match Yuta called out LA Dojo trainer, Katsuyori Shibata. On the March 8, episode of Dynamite, after his Blackpool Combat Club teammates Moxley and Claudio Castagnoli defeated The Dark Order members John Silver and Alex Reynolds, Yuta joined them in beating down "Hangman" Adam Page, turning heel. On March 30, after successfully retaining the title against Leon Ruffin, Yuta was confronted by Shibata, setting up their title match the following day at Supercard of Honor. At the event, Yuta lost the Pure Championship to Shibata, ending his second reign at 111 days. At Double or Nothing, the Blackpool Combat Club defeated The Elite (Kenny Omega, Page, Matt Jackson, and Nick Jackson) in an Anarchy in the Arena match after Yuta pinned its leader Omega. At the Forbidden Door event on June 25, Yuta, Moxley and Castagnoli teamed with Konosuke Takeshita and Shota Umino to take on Page, The Young Bucks, Eddie Kingston and Tomohiro Ishii in a ten-man tag team match, but were defeated. On July 19 at Blood and Guts, the Blackpool Combat Club, Takeshita, and Pac were defeated by The Elite in a Blood and Guts match. On August 27 at All In, the Blackpool Combat Club along with Santana and Ortiz were defeated by Best Friends, Eddie Kingston, and Penta El Zero Miedo in a Stadium Stampede match. On October 1 at WrestleDream Yuta turned face after losing to Ricky Starks. On the November 25 episode of AEW Rampage, Yuta defeated Katsuyori Shibata to win the ROH Pure Championship for a record-setting third time reverting back to a heel in the process. Yuta retained the title against Tom Lawlor at Final Battle.

Between February 2024 and June 2024, Yuta was sidelined by an injury. Yuta returned to action in AEW as a face on the June 5 edition of Dynamite, teaming with his BCC teammates to defeat Esfinge, Magnus, Rugido, and Volador Jr.. Yuta lost the Pure Championship to Lee Moriarty at Death Before Dishonor, ending his third reign at 244 days.

==== Death Riders (2024–present) ====
On August 25 at All In, Yuta and Castagnoli teamed with Pac in the Four-way London Ladder match for the AEW World Trios Championship, which they won. The trio later appeared in show after the main event to celebrate Bryan Danielson winning the AEW World Championship. On September 7 at All Out, Yuta and Castagnoli unsuccessfully challenged The Young Bucks for the AEW World Tag Team Championships. Later in show, Castagnoli and Moxley turned on Danielson after his successful title defense. Yuta did not participate in the turn as he was held back by Pac. Over the following weeks, Yuta was left conflicted over which side to choose before making his choice on October 12 at WrestleDream, where he joined the BCC in attacking Danielson after Moxley defeated Danielson for his title and turned heel once again. In November 2024, the BCC was renamed to Death Riders with Pac and Marina Shafir joining the group.

During Moxley's world title reign from October 2024 to July 2025, Yuta and the other members of the Death Riders would constantly interfere in Moxley's title defenses to help him retain. On April 6 at Dynasty, Yuta, Castagnoli, and Pac successfully defended their titles against Rated FTR. On April 16 at Dynamite: Spring BreakThru, Yuta and Castagnoli with Moxley filling in for an injured Pac lost the trios titles to Powerhouse Hobbs and The Opps (Samoa Joe and Katsuyori Shibata), ending their reign at 234 days. On May 25 at Double or Nothing, the Death Riders teamed with The Young Bucks, losing to Kenny Omega, Swerve Strickland, Willow Nightingale, and The Opps (Samoa Joe, Powerhouse Hobbs, and Katsuyori Shibata) in an Anarchy in the Arena match. On July 12 at All In, Yuta and Castagnoli with Gabe Kidd failed to regain the trios titles from The Opps. The Death Riders were defeated by Darby Allin, Roderick Strong, and The Conglomeration (Mark Briscoe, Orange Cassidy, and Kyle O'Reilly) in Blood and Guts match on November 12 at the namesake event. On December 27 at Worlds End, the Death Riders (barring Moxley and Pac) were defeated by "Timeless" Toni Storm, Roderick Strong, and The Conglomeration (Mark Briscoe and Orange Cassidy) in a Mixed Nuts Mayhem match. Later in the night, the Death Riders appeared in the ring to celebrate Moxley winning the Continental Classic and the AEW Continental Championship.

On February 14, 2026 at Grand Slam Australia, Yuta and Marina Shafir were defeated by Orange Cassidy and Toni Storm. Per the stipulation, Yuta was forced to have his hair shaved bald due to taking the fall. On the October 21 episode of Dynamite, the Death Riders all officially turned face after they and The Conglomeration were all attacked by The Dogs and the Bang Bang Gang, who turned heel.

=== New Japan Pro-Wrestling (2021–present) ===
In April 2021, Yuta made his debut for New Japan Pro-Wrestling (NJPW) with the promotion's American subsidiary, appearing on NJPW Strong. On May 1, 2022, Yuta was announced to be competing in the 29th Best of the Super Juniors tournament as part of the B Block. Yuta finished with a record of five wins and four losses, resulting in 10 points, failing to advance to the finals. On the tournament finals day, Yuta, Ace Austin, Alex Zayne and El Lindaman defeated Robbie Eagles, Yoh, Clark Connors and Titán in a tag-team match. Yuta would continue to appear sporadically for NJPW, mainly on the Strong brand and at the co-promoted Forbidden Door events. In 2026, Yuta would returned to Japan during the G1 Climax tour and at Power Struggle, teaming with Gabe Kidd and Jon Moxley against members of Unbound Co..

=== Pro Wrestling Guerrilla (2022) ===
In January 2022, Yuta made his debut for Pro Wrestling Guerrilla (PWG) at the Battle of Los Angeles. He defeated Blake Christian in the first round, but would lose the second round match to Mike Bailey.

=== Consejo Mundial de Lucha Libre (2025–present) ===
Yuta and his Death Riders stablemate Daniel Garcia made their Consejo Mundial de Lucha Libre (CMLL) debut on the November 11, 2025 episode of Viernes Espectacular, unsuccessfully challenging Los Hermanos Chavez (Angel de Oro and Niebla Roja) for the CMLL World Tag Team Championship. At Homenaje a Dos Leyendas on March 20, 2026, Yuta, Garcia, and Jon Moxley unsuccessfully challenged El Sky Team (Místico, Máscara Dorada, and Neón) for the CMLL World Trios Championship.

== Personal life ==
In his spare time, Gruber enjoys playing steel drums.

== Luchas de Apuestas record ==
Winner (wager)	Loser (wager)	Location	Event	Date	Notes
Orange Cassidy and Toni Storm (hair)	Wheeler Yuta and Marina Shafir (hair) (Note: Only Yuta was required to shave his hair.)	Sydney, Australia	Grand Slam Australia	February 14, 2026	

== Championships and accomplishments ==
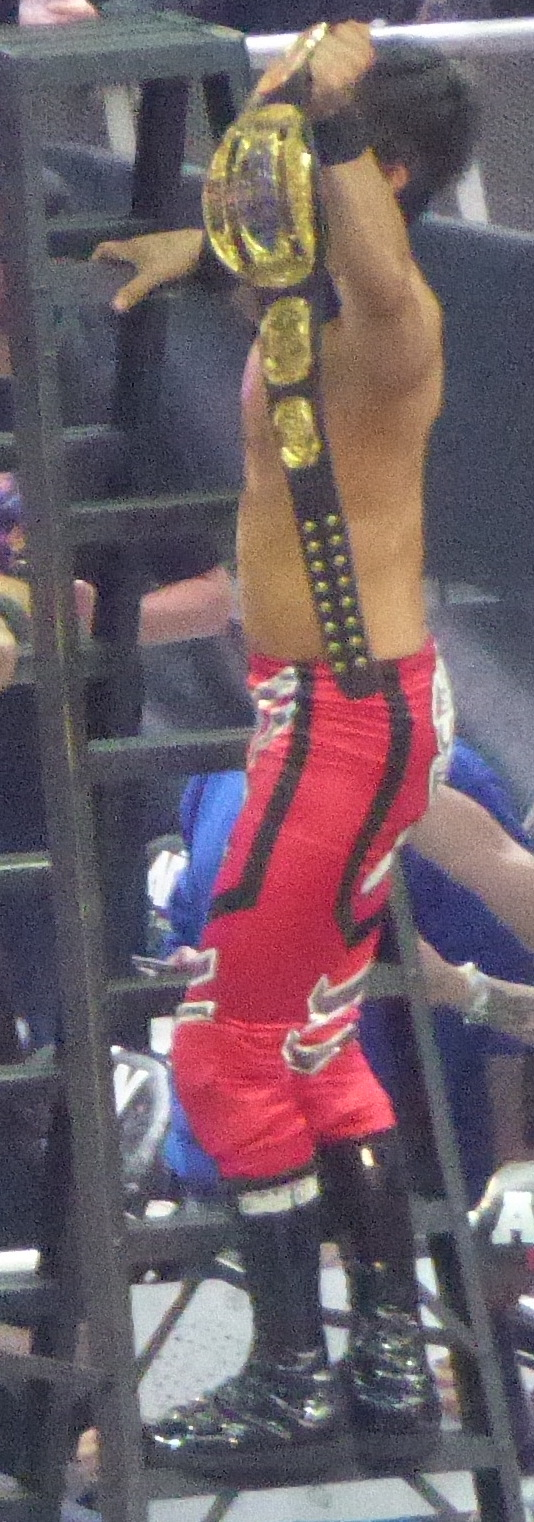
Yuta as AEW World Trios Champion

- All Elite Wrestling
  - AEW World Trios Championship (1 time) – with Pac and Claudio Castagnoli
- Chikara
  - Chikara Young Lions Cup (1 time)
- Combat Zone Wrestling
  - Dramatic Destination Series (2016)
  - Trifecta (2018)
- Dojo Pro Wrestling
  - Dojo Pro White Belt Championship (1 time)
- ESPN
  - Ranked No. 20 of the 30 best Pro Wrestlers Under 30 in 2023
- NOVA Pro Wrestling
  - Men's Commonwealth Cup (2018)
- Pro Wrestling Illustrated
  - Ranked No. 43 of the top 500 singles wrestlers in the PWI 500 in 2022
- Powerbomb.tv
  - IWTV Independent Wrestling World Championship (1 time)
- Ring of Honor
  - ROH Pure Championship (3 times)
