= MLW The World Championship Finals =

2018 Major League Wrestling event

The World Championship Finals
- Promotion: Major League Wrestling
- Date: April 12, 2018
- City: Orlando, Florida
- Venue: Gilt Nightclub
- Attendance: 300

Event chronology
← Previous; Spring Break	Next → Intimidation Games

The World Championship Finals was a professional wrestling event produced by Major League Wrestling (MLW), which took place on April 12, 2018 at the Gilt Nightclub in Orlando, Florida. The event served as a television taping for the promotion's newly-launched television series, MLW Fusion, which would premiere on beIN Sports USA later that month on April 20.

The event was named after its main event, the final round match of a tournament for the reinstated MLW World Heavyweight Championship between Shane Strickland and Matt Riddle, which Strickland won. In other prominent matches on the card, Jimmy Havoc defeated Joey Janela in a Bogus Adventure match, Sami Callihan defeated MVP, Tom Lawlor defeated A. C. H. and Pentagón Jr. defeated Fénix to become the #1 contender for the World Heavyweight Championship.

== Event ==
=== Preliminary matches ===
The event kicked off with a match between Mike Parrow and Vandal Ortagun. Parrow executed a powerbomb on Ortagun for the win. The match was followed by a brawl between Jimmy Havoc and Joey Janela which led to the two brawling to the backstage. Low Ki then cut a promo and MVP was about to interrupt him until Sami Callihan attacked MVP from behind.

Next, A. C. H. was scheduled to take on Tom Lawlor but Lawlor claimed that his broken arm had not healed and if ACH wanted a match against him then he must face Lawlor's Team Filthy teammate Simon Gotch. ACH reversed a gutwrench suplex by Gotch and rolled him up for the win. Team Filthy attacked ACH after the match.

Next, Trey Miguel took on Kotto Brazil. Miguel nailed a meteora on Brazil for the win.

The Dirty Blondes took on Team TBD (Jason Cade and Jimmy Yuta) in an elimination tag team match. Yuta delivered a diving crossbody on Michael Patrick but Patrick rolled through and grabbed Yuta's tights to eliminate him, leaving Cade alone. Dirty Blondes' manager Col. Robert Parker then distracted Cade, allowing Dirty Blondes to eliminate him with a double spinebuster for the win.

Next, Fred Yehi took on Maxwell Jacob Friedman. MJF pinned Yehi by grabbing his tights for leverage after using the referee as a shield.

Next, Pentagón Jr. took on Fénix in a match to determine the #1 contender for the MLW World Heavyweight Championship. Pentagón executed a Fear Factor on Fénix for the win.

This was followed by the women's match between Santana Garrett and Aerial Monroe. Garrett won the match by performing a Shining Star Press on Monroe.

Next, MVP took on Sami Callihan. MVP nailed a drive-by kick and a Playmaker to Callihan after the referee was knocked out in the corner after a collision with Callihan, which allowed Leon Scott to make his MLW debut as he chokeslammed MVP. The referee was distracted in ejecting Scott from the ringside, allowing Callihan to hit a low blow to MVP and a Cradle Killer to MVP for the win.

Later, a Bogus Adventure match took place between Jimmy Havoc and Joey Janela. Havoc dropkicked Janela through a door in the corner following it with a Death Valley driver to Janela through some chairs and then delivered an Acid Rainmaker to Janela for the win. Tom Lawlor and Team Filthy attacked Havoc after the match.

It was followed by the penultimate match of the event in which ACH took on Tom Lawlor. Team Filthy distracted ACH, allowing Lawlor to hit him in the head with his repaired forearm to knock him out and then Lawlor applied a rear naked choke on ACH to win the match via technical submission.

=== Main event match ===
The main event was the final of a tournament for the vacant World Heavyweight Championship between Shane Strickland and Matt Riddle. After a back and forth match, Strickland nailed a JML Driver to Riddle to win the match and become the first World Heavyweight Champion of the reinstated MLW era.

== Results ==
No.	Results	Stipulations	Times
1	Mike Parrow defeated Vandal Ortagun	Singles match	—
2	A. C. H. defeated Simon Gotch (with Tom Lawlor)	Singles match	—
3	Trey Miguel defeated Kotto Brazil	Singles match	—
4	The Dirty Blondes (Leo Brien and Michael Patrick) (with Col. Robert Parker) defeated Team TBD (Jason Cade and Jimmy Yuta)	Elimination tag team match	—
5	Maxwell Jacob Friedman defeated Fred Yehi	Singles match	—
6	Pentagón Jr. defeated Fénix	Singles match to determine the #1 contender for the MLW World Heavyweight Championship	—
7	Santana Garrett defeated Aerial Monroe	Singles match	—
8	Sami Callihan defeated MVP	Singles match	—
9	Jimmy Havoc defeated Joey Janela (with Aria Blake)	Bogus Adventure match	—
10	Tom Lawlor defeated ACH via technical submission	Singles match	—
11	Shane Strickland defeated Matt Riddle	MLW World Heavyweight Championship tournament final	21:45

=== Tournament brackets ===
First round Road To The World Championship (February 8)
MVP	Pin
Tom Lawlor	10:44
Matt Riddle	Pin
Jeff Cobb	13:40
Shane Strickland	Pin
Brody King	10:53
Jimmy Havoc	Pin
Maxwell Jacob Friedman	9:36

Semifinals; Spring Break (March 8)
A. C. H.
Matt Riddle
Shane Strickland
Jimmy Havoc

Final; The World Championship Finals (April 12)
Matt Riddle	Pin
Shane Strickland	21:45
