= MLW Road To The World Championship =

2018 Major League Wrestling event

Road To The World Championship
- Promotion: Major League Wrestling
- Date: February 8, 2018
- City: Orlando, Florida
- Venue: Gilt Nightclub
- Attendance: 250-300

Event chronology
← Previous; Zero Hour	Next → Spring Break

Road To The World Championship was a professional wrestling event produced by Major League Wrestling (MLW), which took place on February 8, 2018 at the Gilt Nightclub in Orlando, Florida. The event featured the opening round of a tournament for the reinstated MLW World Heavyweight Championship.

Twelve professional wrestling matches were contested at the card. The main event was a hardcore match between Darby Allin and Sami Callihan, which Allin won. The first round matches of the World Heavyweight Championship tournament took place on the undercard while a match between Austin Aries and A. C. H. aired on the inaugural episode of Fusion.

== Event ==
=== Preliminary matches ===
The event kicked off with a women's match between Santana Garrett and Lacey Lane. Garrett executed a Shining Star Press for the win.

Next, The Crash Junior Champion Destino Negro took on Mega Danger. Negro executed an avalanche driver for the win.

Next, Jason Cade and Jimmy Yuta took on Team Filthy members Seth Petruzelli and Simon Grimm. Colonel Robert Parker interfered in the match to distract Cade and Yuta and The Dirty Blondes attacked Cade while he had climbed the top rope and Team Filthy hit a jumping piledriver to Cade for the win.

Next, Kotto Brazil took on Low Ki. After ripping off Brazil's mask, Ki applied a Dragon Clutch on Brazil to make him pass out to the hold to win the match.

Next, Chelsea Green took on Priscilla Kelly. Kelly was disqualified after raking Green in the eyes. Santana Garrett showed up to aid Kelly after the match.

Next, Austin Aries took on A. C. H. Aries executed a brainbuster on ACH for the win.

It was followed by a tag team match pitting Barrington Hughes and Mike Parrow against Saieve Al Sabah and Vandal Ortagun. Parrow was initially double teamed by his opponents until Hughes joined the match and quickly dominated the match and nailed a big splash on Ortagun for the win.

=== Tournament matches ===
The World Heavyweight Championship tournament kicked off with a match between Jimmy Havoc and Maxwell Jacob Friedman. Havoc reversed a kneeling reverse piledriver by Friedman but Havoc countered with a spike piledriver and hit an Acid Rainmaker to Friedman.

The next tournament match took place between Shane Strickland and Brody King. Strickland hit King with elbows while King had climbed to the top rope and then drove with a superplex and a diving double foot stomp for the win.

Later, MVP took on Tom Lawlor. Stokely Hathaway distracted the referee while MVP had applied a crossface on Lawlor and the distraction allowed Low Ki to kick MVP in the back of the head and Lawlor pinned MVP for the win.

It was followed by the penultimate match of the event and the last match in the opening round of the tournament between Matt Riddle and Jeff Cobb. Riddle hit a knee strike to Cobb and powerbombed him and collapsed on him to pin him for the win.

=== Main event match ===
The main event was a hardcore match between Sami Callihan and Darby Allin. Callihan hog tied Allin's hands behind his back with a duct tape but Priscilla Kelly distracted Callihan which allowed Jimmy Havoc to hit a lariat and an Acid Rainmaker to Callihan and then Allin delivered a springboard Coffin Drop to Callihan for the win. After the match, Allin was about to attack Callihan until Joey Janela made his MLW debut and smashed a beer bottle over Allin's head.

== Aftermath ==
The match between Austin Aries and ACH aired on the first-ever episode of MLW's new television program Fusion, marking the first match ever to air in the history of Fusion on April 20, 2018.

The World Heavyweight Championship tournament continued at Spring Break. Matches were set up for the semifinals as Jimmy Havoc was set to take on Shane Strickland and Tom Lawlor was set to take on Matt Riddle. However, Lawlor broke his forearm before the match and was replaced by ACH as Riddle's opponent in the semifinal.

Barrington Hughes' victory led to him entering a short feud with Vandal Ortagun and a match was set up between the two at Spring Break.

An unsanctioned fight was set between MVP and Low Ki at Spring Break.

An elimination tag team match was set up between the team of Jason Cade and Jimmy Yuta and The Dirty Blondes to take place at The World Championship Finals.

== Results ==
No.	Results	Stipulations	Times
1	Santana Garrett defeated Lacey Lane	Singles match	3:45
2	Destino Negro defeated Mega Danger	Singles match	7:34
3	Seth Petruzelli and Simon Grimm defeated Jason Cade and Jimmy Yuta	Tag team match	7:52
4	Low Ki defeated Kotto Brazil	Singles match	4:40
5	Chelsea Green defeated Priscilla Kelly (with Darby Allin and Jimmy Havoc) by disqualification	Singles match	2:10
6^{FT}	Austin Aries defeated A. C. H.	Singles match	17:17
7	Barrington Hughes and Mike Parrow defeated Saieve Al Sabah and Vandal Ortagun	Tag team match	0:23
8	Jimmy Havoc defeated Maxwell Jacob Friedman	MLW World Heavyweight Championship tournament first round	9:36
9	Shane Strickland defeated Brody King	MLW World Heavyweight Championship tournament first round	10:53
10	Tom Lawlor defeated MVP	MLW World Heavyweight Championship tournament first round	10:44
11	Matt Riddle defeated Jeff Cobb	MLW World Heavyweight Championship tournament first round	13:40
12	Darby Allin defeated Sami Callihan	Hardcore match	18:54
FT / – the match was taped for a future broadcast of Fusion

=== Tournament brackets ===
First round Road To The World Championship (February 8)
MVP	Pin
Tom Lawlor	10:44
Matt Riddle	Pin
Jeff Cobb	13:40
Shane Strickland	Pin
Brody King	10:53
Jimmy Havoc	Pin
Maxwell Jacob Friedman	9:36

Semifinals; Spring Break (March 8)
A. C. H.
Matt Riddle
Shane Strickland
Jimmy Havoc

Final; The World Championship Finals (April 12)
Matt Riddle	Pin
Shane Strickland	21:45
