= ROH Pure Tournament =

- Promotion: ROH
- Date: September 12 to October 31, 2020
- City: Baltimore, Maryland
- Venue: UMBC Event Center
- Attendance: 0 (behind closed doors) (Note: Held without fans due to the COVID-19 pandemic.)

ROH Pure Tournament
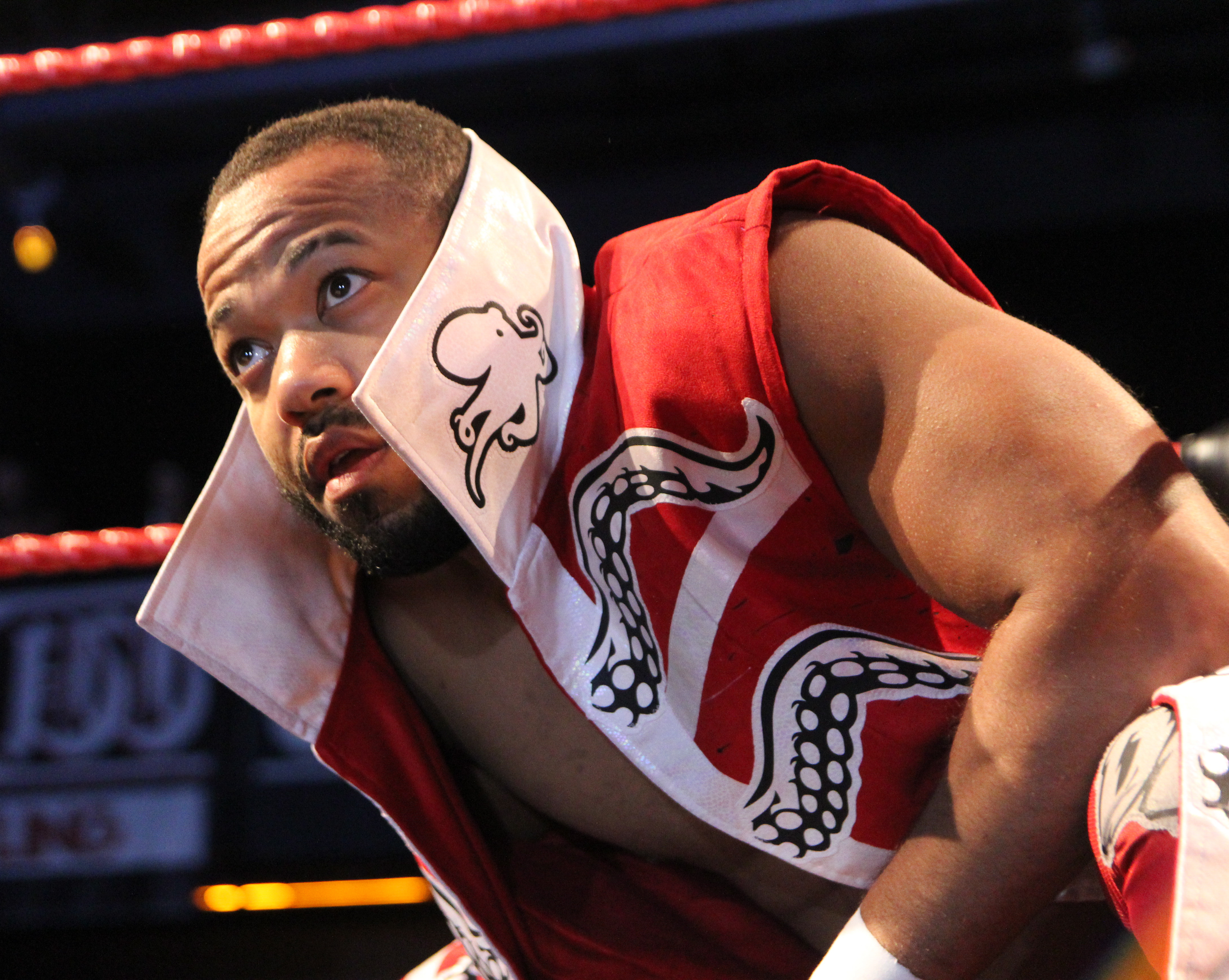
- Jonathan Gresham, winner of the tournament and new ROH Pure Champion

Tournament information
- Sport: Professional wrestling
- Location: United States
- Dates: September 12, 2020–October 31, 2020
- Tournament format: Single-elimination tournament
- Participants: 16

Final positions
- Champion: Jonathan Gresham
- Runner-up: Tracy Williams

Tournament statistics
- Matches played: 15

The ROH Pure Tournament was a single-elimination professional wrestling tournament produced by Ring of Honor Wrestling. The tournament, originally scheduled to start on April 12, commenced on September 12, 2020 and ended on October 31, 2020. It featured 16 wrestlers competing for the newly-reactivated ROH Pure Championship: 9 from Ring of Honor, 2 from New Japan Pro-Wrestling, and 5 free agent or independent wrestlers.

== Background ==
Other on-screen personnel
Role:	Name:
Host	Quinn McKay
Commentators	Ian Riccaboni
Commentators	Caprice Coleman
Ring announcer	Nick Lendl
Referees	Todd Sinclair
Referees	Joe Mandak
Judges	Gary Juster
Judges	Will Ferrara
Judges	Sumie Sakai

=== History ===
The ROH Pure Championship was announced to be reactivated on April 12, 2020, being used for the first time since 2006, with events to take place in Columbus, Ohio and Pittsburgh, Pennsylvania. However, plans had to be put on hold due to the COVID-19 pandemic, with ROH suspending all television production immediately thereafter. In August, it was announced that ROH would return to producing TV starting in September with the ROH Pure Tournament that was originally scheduled 5 months ago. The field of announced wrestlers includes Jay Lethal, Dalton Castle, Jonathan Gresham, Tracy Williams, Kenny King, P. J. Black, Josh Woods, Delirious, and Silas Young from Ring of Honor, David Finlay and Rocky Romero from New Japan Pro-Wrestling, and Matt Sydal, Fred Yehi, Tony Deppen, Wheeler Yuta, and Rust Taylor from the independent circuit. In the event that any wrestler is unable to compete for any reason, there are 2 alternate wrestlers for each block: Dak Draper for block A and Brian Johnson for block B.

=== Rules ===
16 wrestlers compete in a single-elimination tournament, split off into two blocks of "A" (represented by the color red) and "B" (represented by the color silver). The rounds have increasing time limits, starting at a 15-minute time limit for round 1, 20 for round 2, 30 for the block finals, and a 1 hour time limit for the tournament final. Every match begins and ends with the traditional Code of Honor handshake. Each wrestler is allowed only 3 rope breaks for breaking up submissions and pinfalls. After all rope breaks are exhausted, pins and submissions outside of the boundary of the ropes are considered legal. Closed fist punches to the face are illegal, with the first use garnering a warning from the referee and the second use resulting in a disqualification. Open-hand slaps and chops to the face, as well as all punches to the body, excluding low blows, are permitted. Should a match go to a time limit draw, the decision will go to 3 judges positioned at ringside. Any wrestler that interferes in any match will be fired from the company. Once a new champion is crowned, the title can change hands by count-out or disqualification.

=== Storylines ===
The tournament included matches that result from scripted storylines, where wrestlers portray heroes, villains, or less distinguishable characters in scripted events that build tension and culminate in a wrestling match or series of matches.

== Results ==
Round 1 (September 12)
No.	Results	Stipulations	Times
1	Jay Lethal defeated Dalton Castle by pinfall	Singles match, ROH Pure Tournament round 1, Block A match	13:10
2	Jonathan Gresham defeated Wheeler Yuta by submission	Singles match, ROH Pure Tournament round 1, Block B match	10:24

Round 1 (September 19)
No.	Results	Stipulations	Times
1	David Finlay defeated Rocky Romero by pinfall	Singles match, ROH Pure Tournament round 1, Block A match	13:01
2	Matt Sydal defeated Delirious by submission	Singles match, ROH Pure Tournament round 1, Block B match	9:56

Round 1 (September 26)
No.	Results	Stipulations	Times
1	Fred Yehi defeated Silas Young by pinfall	Singles match, ROH Pure Tournament round 1, Block A match	13:00
2	Josh Woods defeated Kenny King by split decision	Singles match, ROH Pure Tournament round 1, Block B match	15:00

Round 1 (October 3)
No.	Results	Stipulations	Times
1	Tracy Williams defeated Rust Taylor by submission	Singles match, ROH Pure Tournament round 1, Block A match	14:25
2	P. J. Black defeated Tony Deppen by pinfall	Singles match, ROH Pure Tournament round 1, Block B match	12:06

Round 2 (October 10)
No.	Results	Stipulations	Times
1	Jay Lethal defeated David Finlay by pinfall	Singles match, ROH Pure Tournament round 2, Block A match	14:57
2	Jonathan Gresham defeated Matt Sydal by submission	Singles match, ROH Pure Tournament round 2, Block B match	13:27

Round 2 (October 17)
No.	Results	Stipulations	Times
1	Tracy Williams defeated Fred Yehi by submission	Singles match, ROH Pure Tournament round 2, Block A match	14:03
2	Josh Woods defeated P. J. Black by submission	Singles match, ROH Pure Tournament round 2, Block B match	13:27

Block Finals (October 24)
No.	Results	Stipulations	Times
1	Jonathan Gresham defeated Josh Woods by pinfall	Singles match, ROH Pure Tournament, Block B final	12:00
2	Tracy Williams defeated Jay Lethal by submission	Singles match, ROH Pure Tournament, Block A final	19:29

Championship (October 31)
No.	Results	Stipulations	Times
1	Jonathan Gresham defeated Tracy Williams by submission	Singles match, ROH Pure Tournament final, for the ROH Pure Championship	14:37

== Bracket ==
Round 1^{1}	Round 2
Jay Lethal	Pin
Dalton Castle	13:10
Jay Lethal	Pin
David Finlay	14:57
David Finlay	Pin
Rocky Romero	13:01
Block A ^{2}
Silas Young	13:00
Fred Yehi	Pin
Fred Yehi	14:03
Tracy Williams	Sub
Tracy Williams	Sub
Rust Taylor	14:25
Jonathan Gresham	Sub
Wheeler Yuta	10:24
Jonathan Gresham	Sub
Matt Sydal	13:27
Delirious	9:59
Matt Sydal	Sub
Block B ^{2}
Josh Woods	Decision
Kenny King	15:00
Josh Woods	Sub
P. J. Black	13:27
P. J. Black	Pin
Tony Deppen	12:06

Block Finals
Jay Lethal	19:29
Tracy Williams	Sub
Jonathan Gresham	Pin
Josh Woods	12:00

Championship
Tracy Williams	14:37
Jonathan Gresham	Sub

1 Participants in the original tournament included: Adam Brooks, Mark Haskins, Joe Hendry, Yuji Nagata, Ren Narita, Marty Scurll, Alex Shelley, Slex, and Doug Williams
2 Dak Draper and Brian Johnson were named as alternates for Block A and Block B, respectively

=== Scorecards ===
Josh Woods vs. Kenny King

Judge	Wrestler
Gary Juster	Woods
Gary Juster	King
Will Ferrara	Woods
Will Ferrara	King
Sumie Sakai	Woods
Sumie Sakai	King
