= Fred Yehi =

American professional wrestler

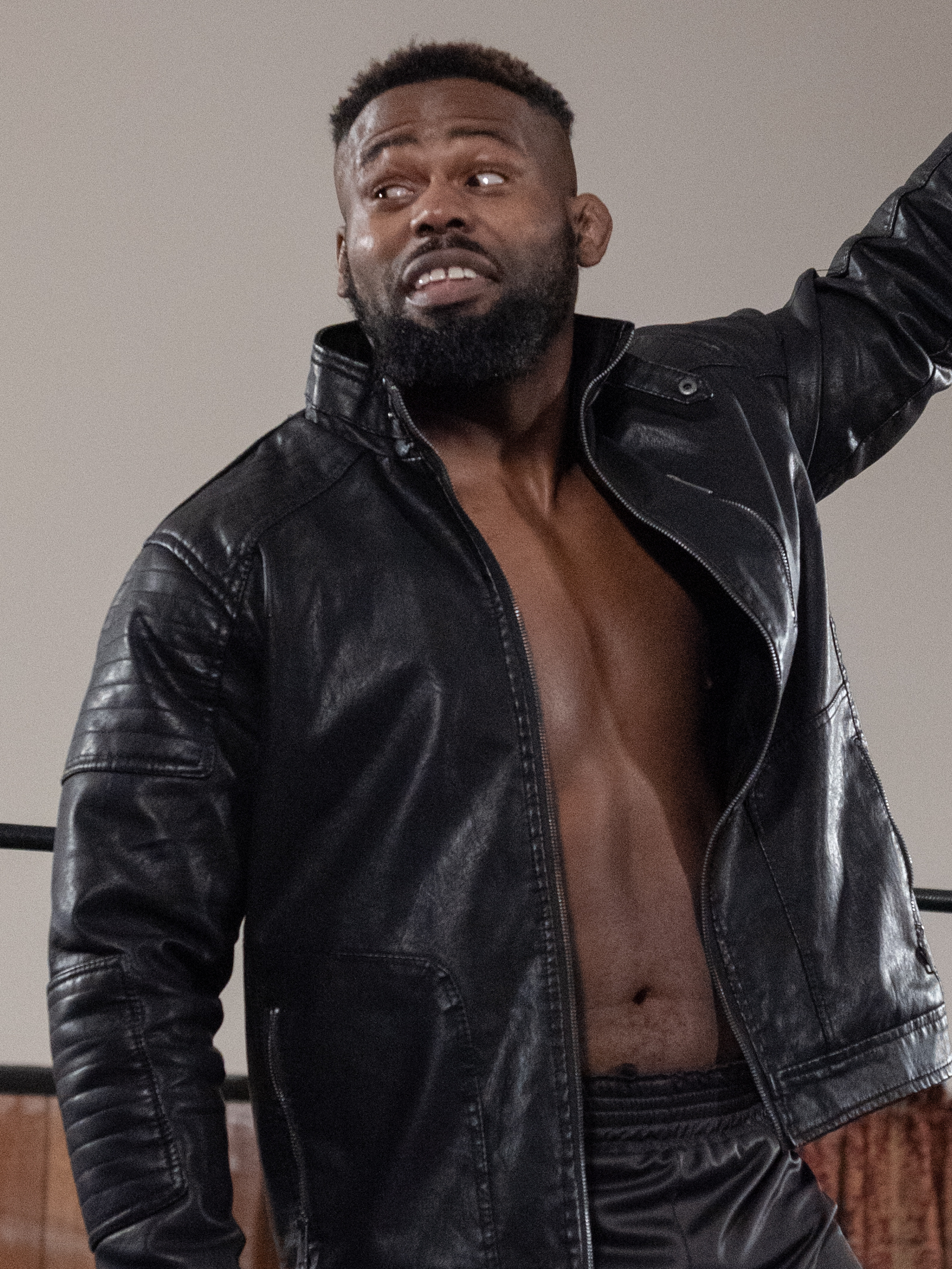
- Yehi in December 2019

Professional wrestling career
- Ring name: Fred Yehi
- Billed height: 5 ft 9 in (175 cm)
- Billed weight: 207 lb (94 kg)
- Billed from: Waterloo, Iowa
- Trained by: Jay Fury; Steve Platinum
- Debut: 2012

Fred Yehi is an American professional wrestler. He is best known for his appearances in Full Impact Pro, Major League Wrestling, Evolve, Combat Zone Wrestling, Revolution Pro Wrestling and Ring Of Honor.

== Professional wrestling career ==
=== Evolve and Full Impact Pro (2015–2020) ===
Yehi made his Evolve debut at Evolve 51 losing to Lio Rush. Yehi returned to Evolve in early 2016 in the Style Battle 2016 Tournament Round Robin Challenge losing to Tracy Williams and Matt Riddle. At Evolve 55 he lost to Anthony Nese in a four-way match. At Evolve 56, Yehi joined Catch Point after a loss to Drew Gulak. At Evolve 61, Yehi lost a WWE Cruiserweight Classic qualifying match to T. J. Perkins. Yehi defeated Anthony Nese at Evolve 62 after applying a Koji Clutch after Nese attempted a 450 Splash, this was Yehi's first win in Evolve. At Evolve 65, Catch Point defeat Jonathan Gresham, Darby Allin and Chris Dickinson. At Evolve 73, Yehi and Tracy Williams became the Evolve tag team champions for the first time after defeating Chris Hero (replacement for Drew Galloway) and DUSTIN, Tony Nese and Drew Gulak, and The Gatekeepers. Catch Point successfully defended the Evolve Tag Team titles at Evolve 74, defeating Peter Kaasa and Ricochet.

Yehi debuted for Full Impact Pro at Everything Burns in 2016 teaming with Gary Jay and defeating Aaron Solo and Jason Cade. Yehi defeated Caleb Konley at Accelerate 2016 to win the FIP World Heavyweight Championship. Yehi successfully retained his championship by defeating Aaron Solow at Declaration Of Independence in July, 2016. On December 10, 2017, Yehi lost the FIP World Title against Austin Theory at EVOLVE 97.

=== Independent circuit (2018–2023) ===
In 2018 Yehi debuted with Major League Wrestling (MLW), a promotion owned by former WWE creative team member Court Bauer, which has a weekly televised program MLW Fusion on the BeIN Sports network. During his time, he was a member of Team Filthy.

In 2018, Yehi defeated Simon Grimm in his debut for Black Label Pro.

In 2018, Yehi debuted for United Kingdom promotion, Revolution Pro Wrestling (RevPro) defeating Josh Bodom. In his second match, he defeated Chris Brookes.

In 2020, Yehi wrestled a one hour Iron Man Match defeating Jeremy Wyatt in a charity event put on by Journey Pro and Saint Louis Anarchy.

=== Ring of Honor (2020–2021) ===
On September 26, 2020 on Ring of Honor Television, Yehi made an appearance wrestling Silas Young in the ROH Pure Tournament and defeated Young. On October 17, 2020, Yehi lost to Tracy Williams in the quarter final round of the tournament. Yehi continued making regular appearances throughout 2021 until the promotion shuttered in October of that same year.

== Championships and accomplishments ==
- AAW Wrestling
  - AAW Heavyweight Championship (1 time)
- Allied Independent Wrestling Federations/Deep South Championship Wrestling
  - AIWF America's Heavyweight Championship (1 time)
  - Indie Wrestling Championship (1 time, inaugural)
  - Indie Wrestling Title Tournament (2015)
- Anarchy Wrestling
  - Anarchy Tag Team Championship (1 time) – with Slim J
- Evolve
  - Evolve Tag Team Championship (1 time) – with Tracy Williams
- World Wrestling Network
  - Style Battle#6 Tournament (2017)
- Full Impact Pro
  - FIP World Heavyweight Championship (1 time)
- Peachstate Wrestling Alliance
  - PWA No Limits Championship (1 time)
- Pro Wrestling Bushido/Livewire Wrestling
  - King of Bushido 4 Tournament (2018)
- Premiere Wrestling Xperience
  - PWX Innovative Television Championship (1 time)
- Pro Wrestling Illustrated
  - PWI ranked him #107 of the top 500 singles wrestlers in the PWI 500 in 2021
