= Tracy Williams =

American professional wrestler (born 1988)

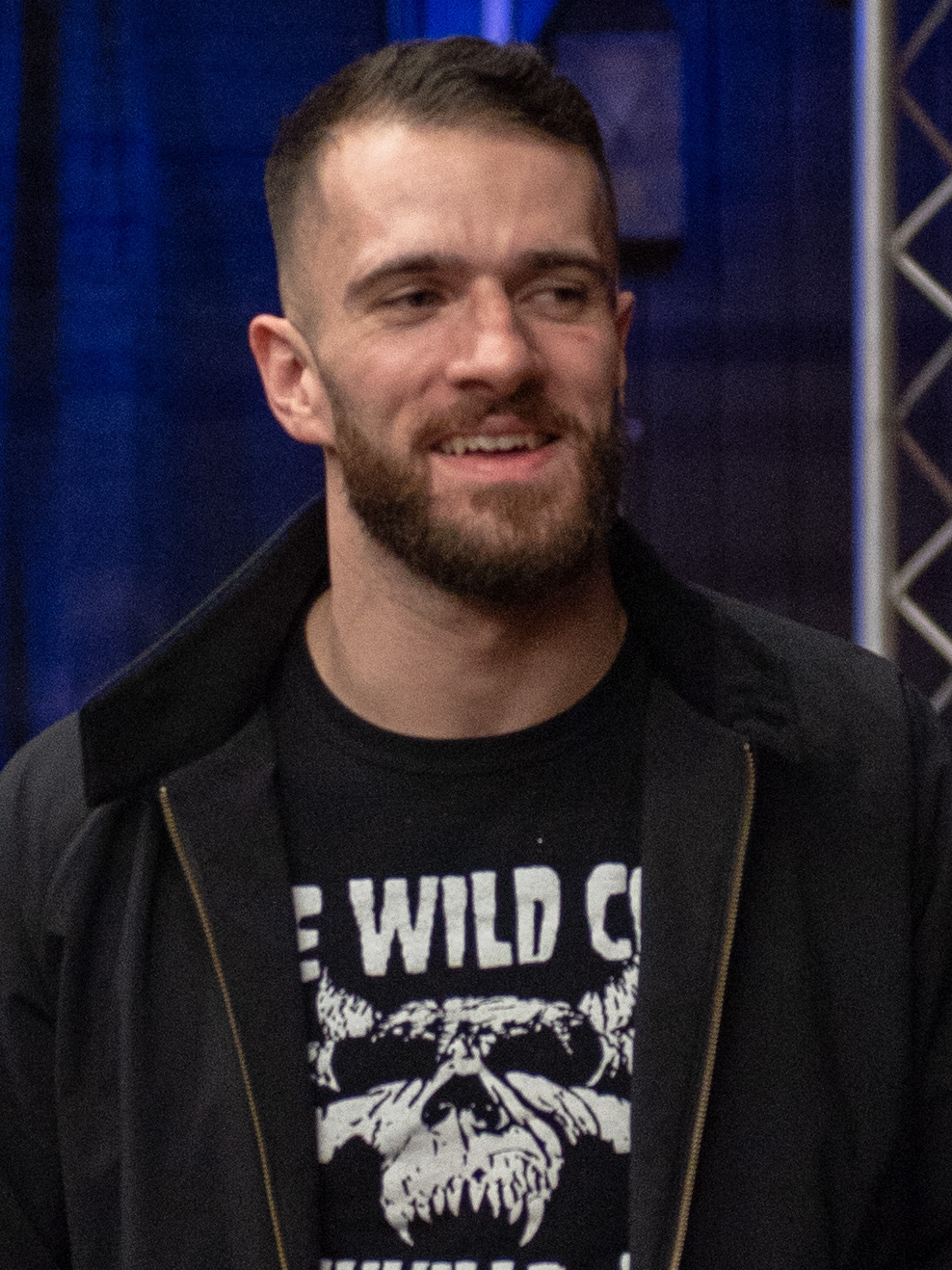
- Williams in February 2019

Personal information
- Born: December 18, 1988 (age 37) Brooklyn, New York, New York, U.S.

Professional wrestling career
- Ring name(s): Dieter VonSteigerwalt; Green Ant; Silver Ant; The Tender Weapon; Tracy Williams
- Billed height: 6 ft 2 in (188 cm)
- Billed weight: 185 lb (84 kg)
- Billed from: Brooklyn, New York, New York, United States
- Trained by: Claudio Castagnoli; Mike Quackenbush; Sara Amato
- Debut: July 31, 2009

Tracy Williams (born December 18, 1988) is an American professional wrestler who currently performs on the independent circuit. Best known under his nickname "Hot Sauce", he is known for his work with Ring of Honor (ROH), where he is a former one-time ROH World Tag Team Champion and former one-time ROH World Television Champion. He is also known for his appearances with Chikara, Evolve Wrestling, and New Japan Pro-Wrestling (NJPW).

== Professional wrestling career ==
=== Chikara (2009–2017) ===
On February 20, 2009, Williams made his professional wrestling debut in the Chikara wrestling promotion, as Green Ant, tending to Worker Ant after he had been injured (kayfabe) by Chuck Taylor’s Awful Waffle finisher. It was then revealed that Worker Ant was forced to retire due to his injuries, and that Green Ant would stand in his absence. Green Ant made his professional wrestling debut on July 31, when The Colony defeated The Order of the Neo-Solar Temple (Crossbones, Delirious and UltraMantis Black) in a six-man tag team match. On October 18, Green Ant was chosen to go on fellow Colony stablemate Fire Ant’s team in the annual torneo cibernetico, going up against Soldier Ant’s team, which had Carpenter Ant on it, but Green Ant was unsuccessful. From April 23–25, Green Ant and his fellow Colony stablemates Fire Ant and Soldier Ant entered the 2010 King of Trios, defeating the team of Flip Kendrick, Louis Lyndon and Johnny Gargano in their first round match on the 23, before going on to defeat the BDK trio of Pinkie Sanchez (the former Carpenter Ant), Lince Dorado and Tim Donst, handing BDK their first non-disqualification loss on the 24. On the last day of King of Trios, April 25, The Colony defeated Team Osaka Pro (Atsushi Kotoge, Daisuke Harada and Tadasuke) in the semi-final, before being defeated by the main BDK trio of Ares, Claudio Castagnoli and Tursas, when referee Derek Sabato turned rudo, ending the match with a fast count and aligning himself with BDK. On August 29, Green Ant broke his arm in a match with Keita Yano, and when he returned in February 2011, Chikara then started a storyline, similar to what the World Wrestling Federation (WWF, now WWE) did with Lex Luger in 1993, where it was claimed that Green Ant had a metal plate inserted into his arm, which resulted in strikes from the elbow being more powerful due to the plate. From April 15–17, The Colony entered the 2011 King of Trios, defeating Sinn Bodhi, Kodama and Obariyon in their first round match. The next day, during a fan conclave, Chikara held a contest to see who could bodyslam the 375 lb (170 kg) BDK member Tursas. Green Ant entered the contest, again copying the storyline that the WWF did with Luger and Yokozuna in 1993, but before he could complete the slam, he was tripped by BDK member Jakob Hammermeier. The next day, The Colony defeated the BDK trio of Tim Donst, Delirious and Hammermeier, after Green Ant bodyslammed Tursas, and then submitted Hammermeier with Luger’s trademark finisher, the Torture Rack, to reach the semifinals. The following day, The Colony defeated The Osirian Portal (Amasis, Hieracon and Ophidian) to advance to the finals for the second time in a row. Later that same day, The Colony defeated F.I.S.T (Chuck Taylor, Icarus and Johnny Gargano) to win the 2011 King of Trios. In July, Green Ant started a ‘Flex Express’ bus tour that was featured on Chikara’s video podcasts, in preparation for his match with Tursas, once again imitating a similar tour Luger did in 1993. One of the episodes even featured a cameo from Luger himself. The match took place on July 30, and it saw Tursas defeat Green Ant, following interference from Jakob Hammermeier. On August 27, Green Ant took part and advanced to the ninth annual Young Lions Cup tournament, before losing to Osaka Pro Wrestling representative Tadasuke. The following month, Green Ant and Fire Ant, as The Colony, made their first tour of Japan with Osaka Pro, culminating in a match for the Osaka Pro Tag Team Championship, where they unsuccessfully challenged Atsushi Kotoge and Daisuke Harada. On November 13, at Chikara’s first internet-pay-per-view, High Noon, Green Ant ended his feud with Tursas by defeating him with his new finisher, the Chikara Special: Green.

2012 saw Green Ant, along with The Colony, and other top Chikara stars, start a feud with the Gekido group, with The Colony mainly focusing on the trio of assailANT, combatANT and deviANT, also known as the Swarm. For the 2012 King of Trios, Chikara’s Director of Fun Wink Vavasseur mixed members of the Colony with members of the Swarm, with Green Ant and Fire Ant being forced to team with assailANT as The Colony. Following those changes, The Colony lost in the first round of King of Trios, to Team Sendai Girls (Dash Chisako, Meiko Satomura and Sendai Sachiko). Green Ant and Fire Ant were also forced to remain with assailANT after King of Trios had ended. At Under the Hood, The Colony teamed with Mike Quackenbush, in a losing effort to The Swarm team of deviANT and Soldier Ant and The Pieces of Hate (Jigsaw and The Shard). When Chikara went inactive following Aniversario: Never Compromise in June 2013, Green Ant and Fire Ant took the time to try and search for Soldier Ant, after Soldier had (kayfabe) quit Chikara in April that year. It was also revealed through The Ashes of Chikara, that Green Ant and Fire Ant still had issues trusting assailANT, due to his prior association with Gekido, but eventually trusted him after assailANT revealed the real reason why he had a change of heart; he had become a father, and he didn’t want his son to see him as a bitter and resentful man. Green Ant and assailANT reconciled, and Green Ant passed on the mantle of Worker Ant to assailANT.

=== Evolve Wrestling (2014–2018) ===
Williams made his debut in Evolve Wrestling on September 14, 2014, at Evolve 35, losing to Timothy Thatcher. On May 30, 2015, at Evolve 43, Williams and Drew Gulak failed to capture the Open the United Gate Championship, when they were defeated by Johnny Gargano and Rich Swann. Williams has held the Evolve Tag Team Championship with Drew Gulak and Fred Yehi, respectively, representing the stable Catch Point. At Evolve 113, Williams had his final match with the promotion, losing to Evolve Champion Shane Strickland. After that, he left the promotion.

=== Ring of Honor (2018–2021) ===
Williams made his Ring of Honor debut at Survival of the Fittest in November 2018. He participated in the Survival of the Fittest tournament, where he was eliminated at the first round by Jonathan Gresham. At a ROH taping in Atlanta, Georgia, Williams would join Juice Robinson, David Finlay, Mark Haskins, Bandido and Tenille Dashwood in forming a new faction named "Lifeblood". However, after the departures of Dashwood and Robinson from the promotion, Lifeblood quietly disbanded and Williams would find himself once again in singles competition. In September 2020, Williams competed in the ROH Pure Tournament for the ROH Pure Championship where he defeated Rust Taylor in the first round, Fred Yehi in the second round and Jay Lethal in the semi-finals but lost to Jonathan Gresham in the finals. Following this, Williams would join Lethal, Gresham, and Rhett Titus in forming a new faction known as The Foundation.

On March 26, 2021, Williams became a double champion, winning the ROH World Television Championship by defeating Kenny King - who was filling in for the injured recognized champion Dragon Lee - and also the ROH World Tag Team Championship, teaming with Titus to defeat King and La Bestia del Ring - who himself was subbing for recognized champion Dragon Lee. Williams would then lose the TV Title to Tony Deppen on Ring of Honor Wrestling (aired May 1, 2021, but the exact match date is unknown due to it being at a closed door taping). At Final Battle, Team Foundation (Williams, Ethan Carter III, Eli Isom, and Taylor Rust) lost to Rocky Romero and VLNCE UNLTD (Brody King, Homicide, and Tony Deppen), following which ROH went on hiatus.

=== New Japan Pro-Wrestling (2019, 2022, 2023) ===
Williams debuted with New Japan Pro-Wrestling in January 2019 as part of its "The New Beginning USA" event, first teaming with Juice Robinson in Los Angeles, California to defeat Roppongi Vice, then teaming with David Finlay in Charlotte, North Carolina to defeat Chaos, then teaming with Finlay and Robinson to defeat Chaos in Nashville, Tennessee. In April 2019, Williams wrestled on the G1 Supercard pay-per-view jointly promoted by NJPW and ROH in New York City, competing in an Honor Rumble on the pre-show that was won by Kenny King. In May 2019, Williams took part in the War of the Worlds event jointly promoted by NJPW and ROH, primarily teaming with Mark Haskins.

Williams returned to NJPW in October 2022, losing to Minoru Suzuki at "The Night Before Rumble on 44th Street: a Halloween Special" pay-per-view in New York City. He returned once more in April 2023 at NJPW's "Collision in Philadelphia" pay-per-view in Philadelphia, Pennsylvania, losing to Alex Coughlin.

=== All Elite Wrestling / Ring of Honor (2022–2023) ===
In September 2022, Williams debuted in All Elite Wrestling (AEW), losing to Brian Cage on AEW Dark: Elevation. In February 2023, he returned to Ring of Honor (now owned by AEW) on Ring of Honor Wrestling. In March 2023 at Supercard of Honor, Williams lost to Jeff Cobb. At Death Before Dishonor in July 2023, Williams lost to Josh Woods. In October 2023, Williams made his debut on AEW Collision, losing to Claudio Castagnoli.

== Professional wrestling style and persona ==
Williams wrestles in a "technical" style. His signature moves include the "CHIKARA Special: Green" (a submission hold), the flying splash, the frog splash, the Michinoku Driver, the missile dropkick, the Texas Cloverleaf, and the torture rack.

== Championships and accomplishments ==
- Absolute Intense Wrestling
  - AIW Absolute Championship (1 time)
  - AIW Tag Team Championship (2 times) – with Tyson Dux
  - JT Lightning Invitational Tournament (2017)
- Wild Zero Wrestling
  - Wild Zero King Of Zero Grand Prix Championship (1 time, inaugural)
- Chikara
  - King of Trios (2011) - with Fire Ant and Soldier Ant
- Freelance Underground
  - FU Independent Championship (1 time)
- Evolve Wrestling
  - Evolve Tag Team Championship (2 times) – with Drew Gulak (1 time) and Fred Yehi (1 time)
- Forza Lucha!
  - Forza Lucha Cup (2016)
- IndependentWrestling.TV
  - Independent Wrestling Championship (1 times)
- Pro Wrestling Illustrated
  - Ranked No. 90 of the top 500 singles wrestlers in the PWI 500 in 2021
- Ring of Honor
  - ROH World Tag Team Championship (1 time) - with Rhett Titus
  - ROH World Television Championship (1 time)
  - ROH Year-End Award (2 times)
    - Faction of the Year (2020) – with The Foundation (Jay Lethal, Jonathan Gresham, Rhett Titus)
    - Match of the Year (2020) – vs. Jonathan Gresham (ROH Pure Tournament Finals)
