= Jonathan Gresham =

American professional wrestler (born 1988)

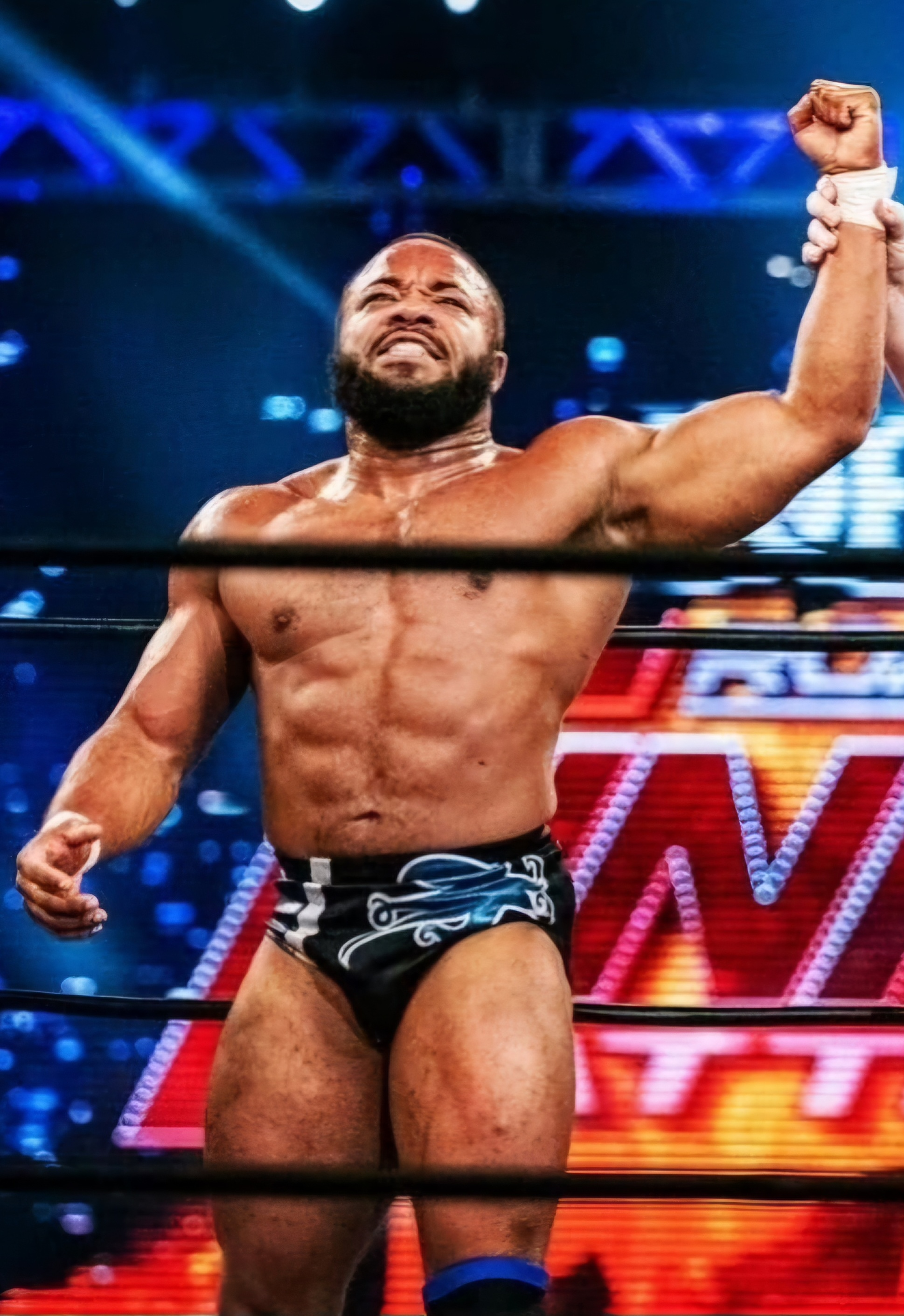
- Gresham in 2020

Personal information
- Born: March 20, 1988 (age 38) Atlanta, Georgia, U.S.
- Spouse: Jordynne Grace (m. 2020)

Professional wrestling career
- Ring name(s): Hero Tiger; Hieracon; Jonathan Davis; Jonathan Gresham; Suicide
- Billed height: 5 ft 4 in (163 cm)
- Billed weight: 190 lb (86 kg)
- Billed from: Atlanta, Georgia
- Trained by: Curtis Hughes; Jay Fury; WWA4 Wrestling School
- Debut: March 5, 2005

Jonathan Gresham (born March 20, 1988) is an American professional wrestler. He currently performing as a freelancer on the independent circuit. He is best known for his tenures with Ring of Honor (ROH) and Total Nonstop Action Wrestling (TNA).

He also has international experience, having wrestled in over 15 countries, including in Germany with Westside Xtreme Wrestling (wXw), and in England for Progress Wrestling, where he is a former Progress World Champion.

== Early life ==
Joanathan Gresham was born on March 20, 1988, in Atlanta, Georgia. Gresham competed in amateur wrestling until he was 17. Some of Gresham's influences were Rey Mysterio, Hayabusa, Bam Bam Bigelow, Dean Malenko, Jushin Thunder Liger, Low Ki, The Hardy Boyz, Ikuto Hidaka and Alex Shelley among others.

== Professional wrestling career ==
=== Independent circuit (2005–2019) ===
Gresham trained under Mr. Hughes, Jay Fury and the WWA4 wrestling school in Atlanta. His first match was in Douglasville, Georgia, against Heath Miller. At the time he was only 16 years old. Gresham made his National Wrestling Alliance debut in 2006 as Jonathan Davis in a four-way tag team match losing to Darin Childs and Seth Shai. In 2007, he defeated Amien Rios in his debut match for Great Championship Wrestling in Alabama. In 2010, Gresham defeated A. R. Fox for GCW.

Gresham debuted for Booker T's Pro Wrestling Alliance in 2008 as Hero Tiger defeating Chaotix. He returned to the company in 2010 defeating Ryan Davidson to become the PWA Iron Man Championship. He once again returned to the company (now known as Reality of Wrestling) in 2014 as Jonathan Gresham. In the first round of Full Impact Pro's Jeff Peterson Memorial Cup in 2011, Gresham debuted losing to Bobby Fish. At Declaration Of Independence, Gresham successfully defended his Zero1 International Junior Heavyweight Championship against Lince Dorado.

In 2015, Gresham made his Evolve debut losing to Matt Riddle. At Evolve 65 he lost to Catch Point. Gresham defeated Drastik Boy to win Desastre Total Ultraviolento's Alto Rendimiento title at Coyotes Hambrientos in 2015. He lost the championship to Kim Ray on a Westside Xtreme Wrestling tour.

Gresham debuted for International Wrestling Cartel in 2016 in the Super Indy 15 tournament making it to the finals only to be eliminated by Josh Alexander. At Reloaded 3.0, Gresham won a four-way Super Indy 16 qualifying match. Gresham later won the IWC Super Indy title in June 2017 by defeating Chris LeRusso in the Super Indy 16 tournament in the semi-final only to lose it to Adam Cole in the finals.

Gresham defeated Tracy Williams at Beyond Wrestling's Battle Of Who Could Care Less. Gresham beat Zack Sabre Jr. at Beyond Ripped Off In The Prime Of Life. The following month he defeated Sabre once again at Flesh. This led to a two out of three falls match between the two later that month at Americanrana 2016. Gresham defeated Sabre by pinning him twice. At Americanrana 2017, Gresham defeated Brian Cage. Gresham defeated Joey Lynch to become the inaugural Independent champion in October 2017. He successfully defended the title at Wazzup against Nick Gage. Gresham lost the Independent championship to Tracy Williams in a three-way elimination match at Beyond Abbondanza.

=== Chikara (2010–2012) ===
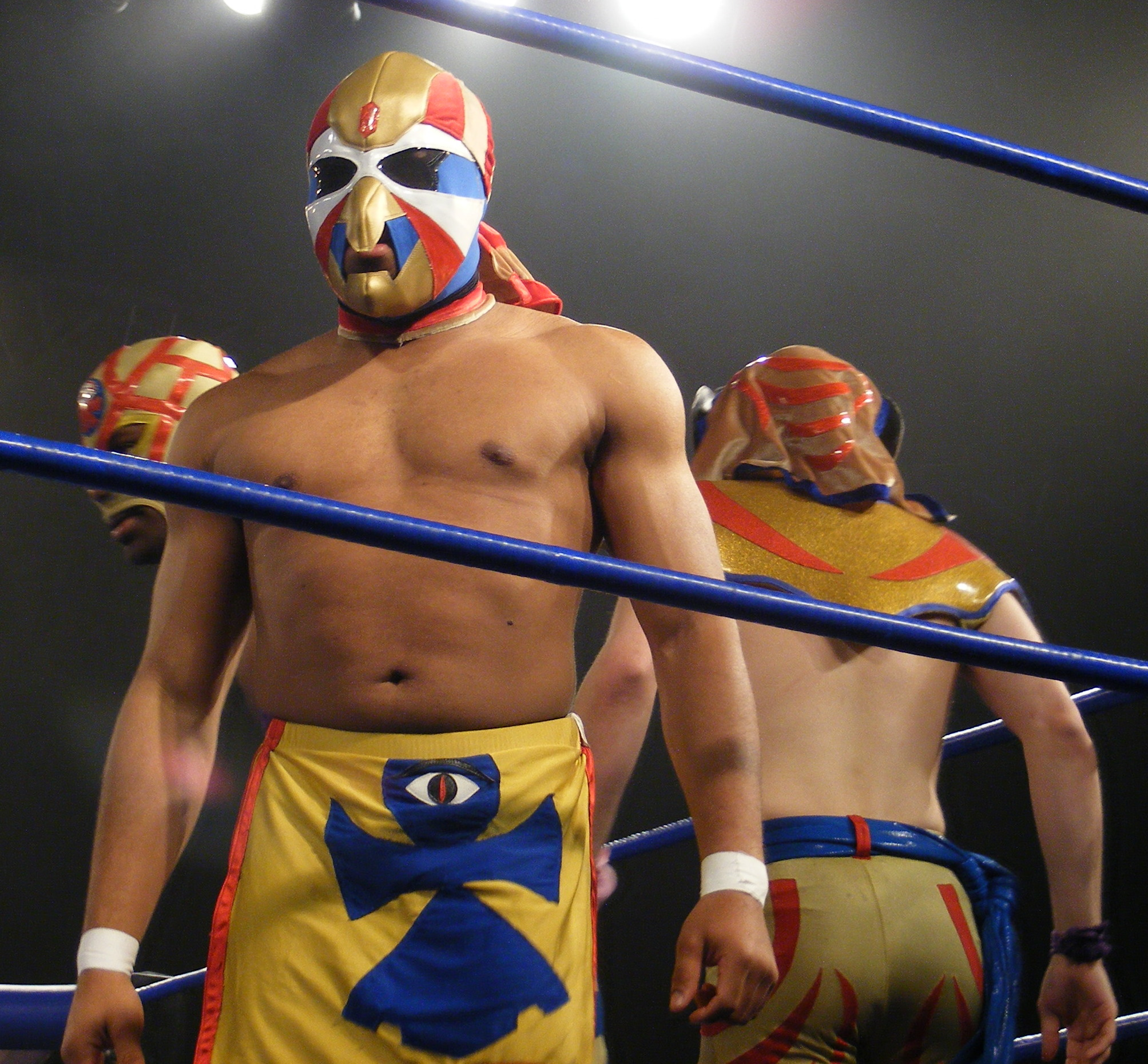
Gresham (center) as "Hieracon" with The Osirian Portal

Gresham made his Chikara debut in 2010 teaming with The Osirian Portal and defeating Bruderschaft des Kreuzes (Lince Dorado, Delirious and Pinkie Sanchez). In January 2011, Gresham now as Hieracon and now part of the Osirian Portal stable defeated Team F.I.S.T (Johnny Gargano, Icarus and Chuck Taylor). The group disbanded after Amasis retired. Ophidian attacked Amasis and unmasked him, turning rudo (heel). Gresham's last match in Chikara was a loss to Ophidian. After the match Ophidian took Hieracon's mask.

=== Combat Zone Wrestling (2010–2017) ===
Gresham debut for Combat Zone Wrestling in 2010 at CZW Fist Fight. Gresham picked up his first win against Greg Excellent in November 2010. Gresham won Best of the Best 15 after defeating David Starr. At Down With The Sickness 2016, Gresham won the CZW World Heavyweight Championship for the first time. At Cage of Death 18, Gresham lost the CZW World Heavyweight Championship to Joe Gacy thus ending his reign.

=== Westside Xtreme Wrestling (2011–2015, 2018–2019, 2022) ===
Gresham debuted for Westside Xtreme Wrestling in 2011 winning against Bernd Föhr in the first round of the Chase The Mahamla Tournament. He would make it to the semi-final only to lose to Shinya Ishikawa. At wXw Payback 5, Gresham alongside Jay Skillet challenged the Sumerian Death Squad (Michael Dante and Tommy End) for the wXw World Tag Team Championship in a losing effort. Gresham and Skillet formed RockSkillet in 2012. In August 2012, RockSkillet defeated Dante and End in a two out of three falls match to become wXw World Tag Team Champions for the first time as well as ending Dante and End's record breaking reign. At Fight Club 2012, RockSkillet defeated OI4K. RockSkillet defeated The Young Bucks at wXw Back To The Roots XII. In March 2013, RockSkillet lost the wXw World Tag Team Championship to AUTsiders (Big van Walter and Robert Dreissker).

Gresham won the 2022 edition of 16 Carat Gold Tournament by defeating Dreissker in the finals.

=== Pro Wrestling Zero1 and affiliates (2012–2017) ===
Gresham debuted for Pro Wrestling Zero1 at Beach Pro Wrestling ~ Chapter 5. Gresham defeated Oliver Cain for the Zero1 USA Midwest X-Division Championship in a cage match at Zero1 USA Supreme in 2013.

Gresham made his return to Zero1 USA Supreme in 2017 to take part in the Zero1 USA Tenkaichi Junior Tournament. Gresham made it to the finals only to lose to Joey O'Riley.

=== Ring of Honor / All Elite Wrestling (2011–2022) ===
==== Early appearances (2011–2015) ====
Gresham made his Ring of Honor debut against Kyle O'Reilly in 2011 in the Top Prospect Tournament.

He returned in 2014 losing to Will Ferrara in a dark match.

In 2015, Gresham returned to Ring Of Honor at the Winter Warriors tour. In December 2015, he defeated Cedric Alexander.

==== Search and Destroy (2017–2020) ====
In 2017, it was announced that Ring of Honor had signed Gresham to a contract. In April 2017, Gresham teamed with Chris Sabin where they defeated Cheeseburger and Will Ferrara. Gresham, along with Jay White, Chris Sabin and Alex Shelley formed Search and Destroy. On June 24, Gresham defeated Flip Gordon. At Best in the World, Search and Destroy defeated the Rebellion (Rhett Titus, Kenny King, Shane Taylor and Caprice Coleman) were the losing team must disband. Gresham took part of the Honor Rumble in 2017. On the September 9th, 2017 episode of Ring Of Honor, Search and Destroy defeated The Bullet Club. At Final Battle, Gresham defeated Josh Woods in a pre-show dark match. Gresham then went on to lose to Jay Lethal at Honor Reigns Supreme and to Chuckie T at Supercard of Honor XII. At Final Battle in 2019, Gresham teamed with Jay Lethal to defeat The Briscoe Brothers to win the ROH World Tag Team Championship.

==== Pure Champion; World Champion (2020–2022) ====
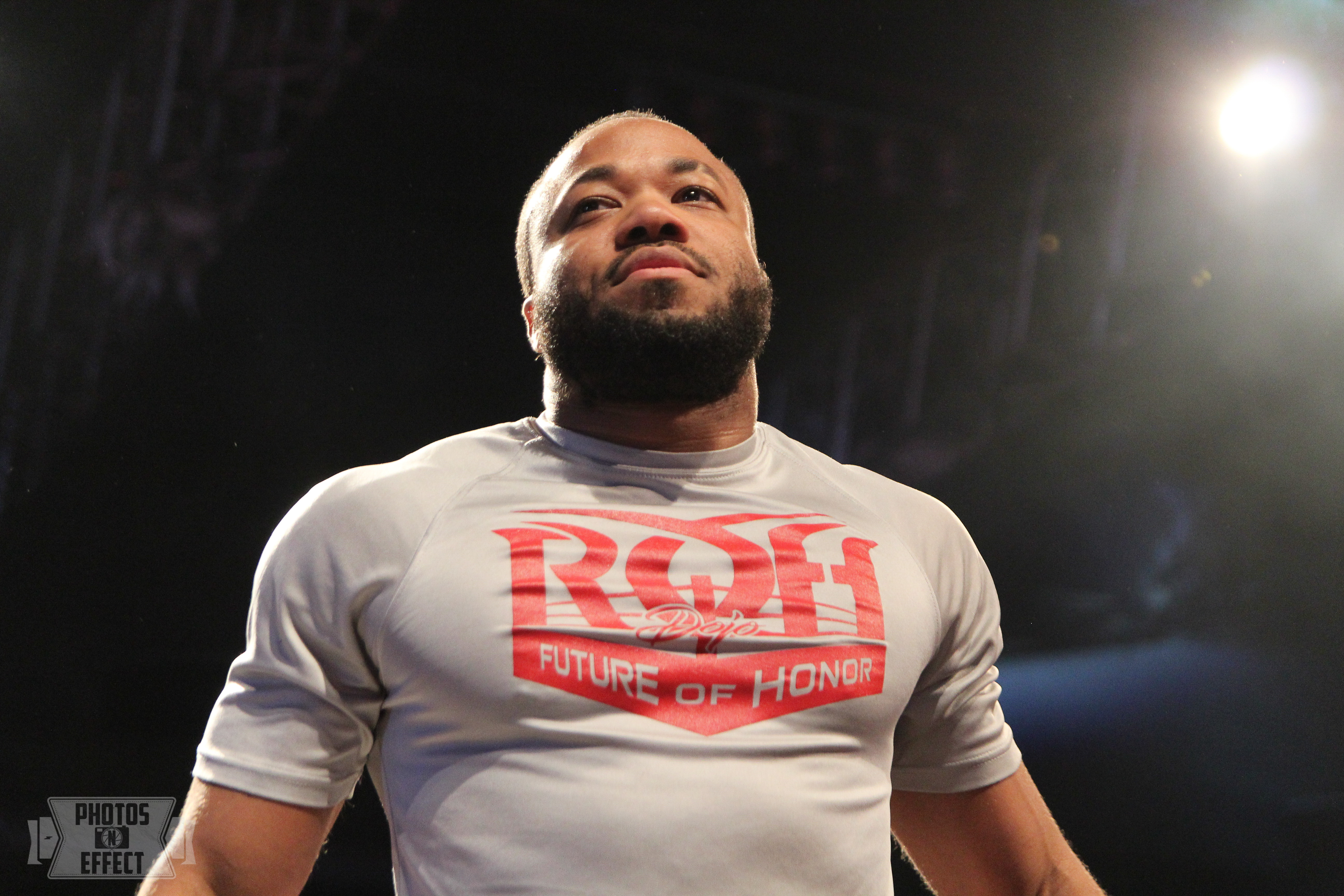
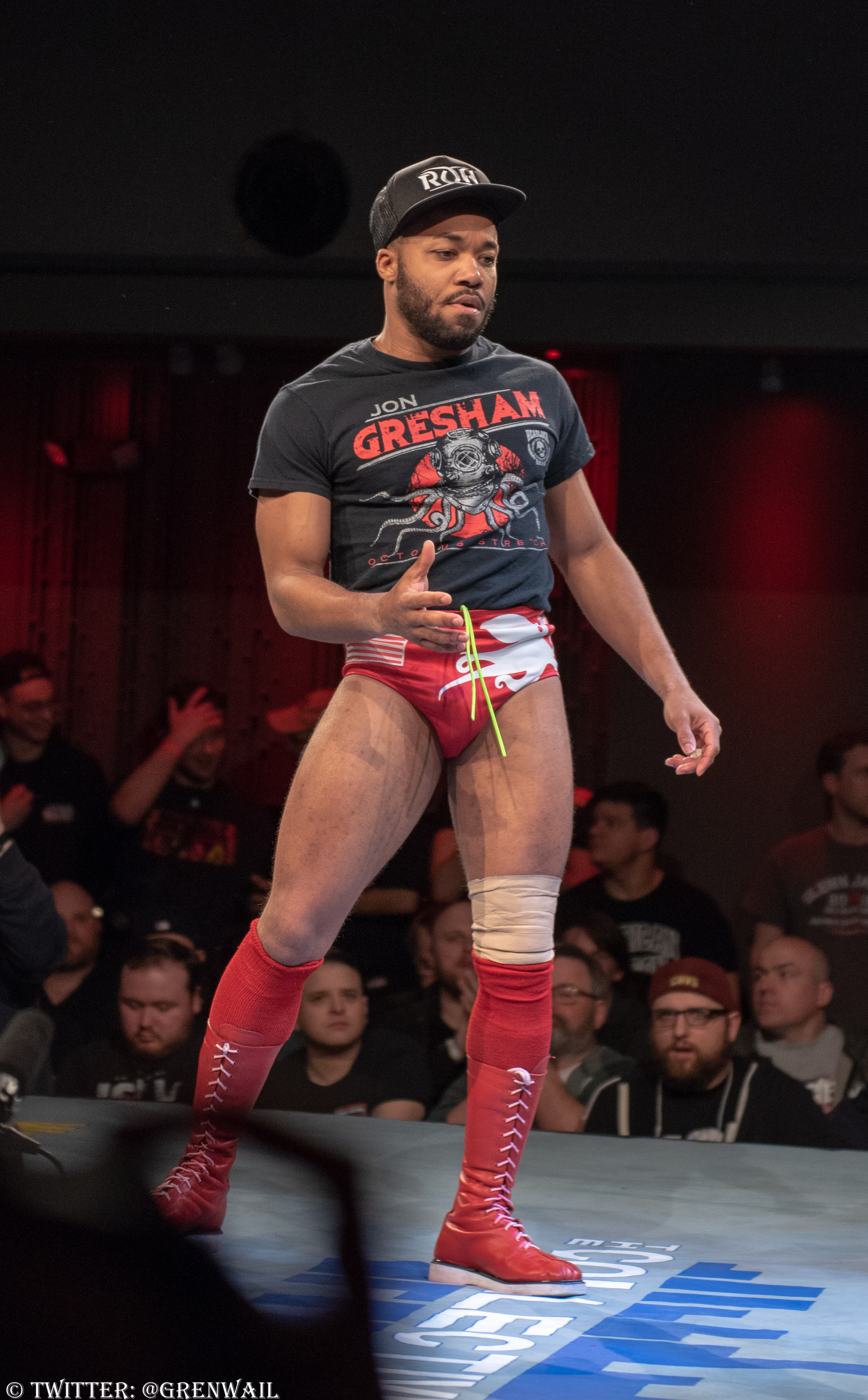
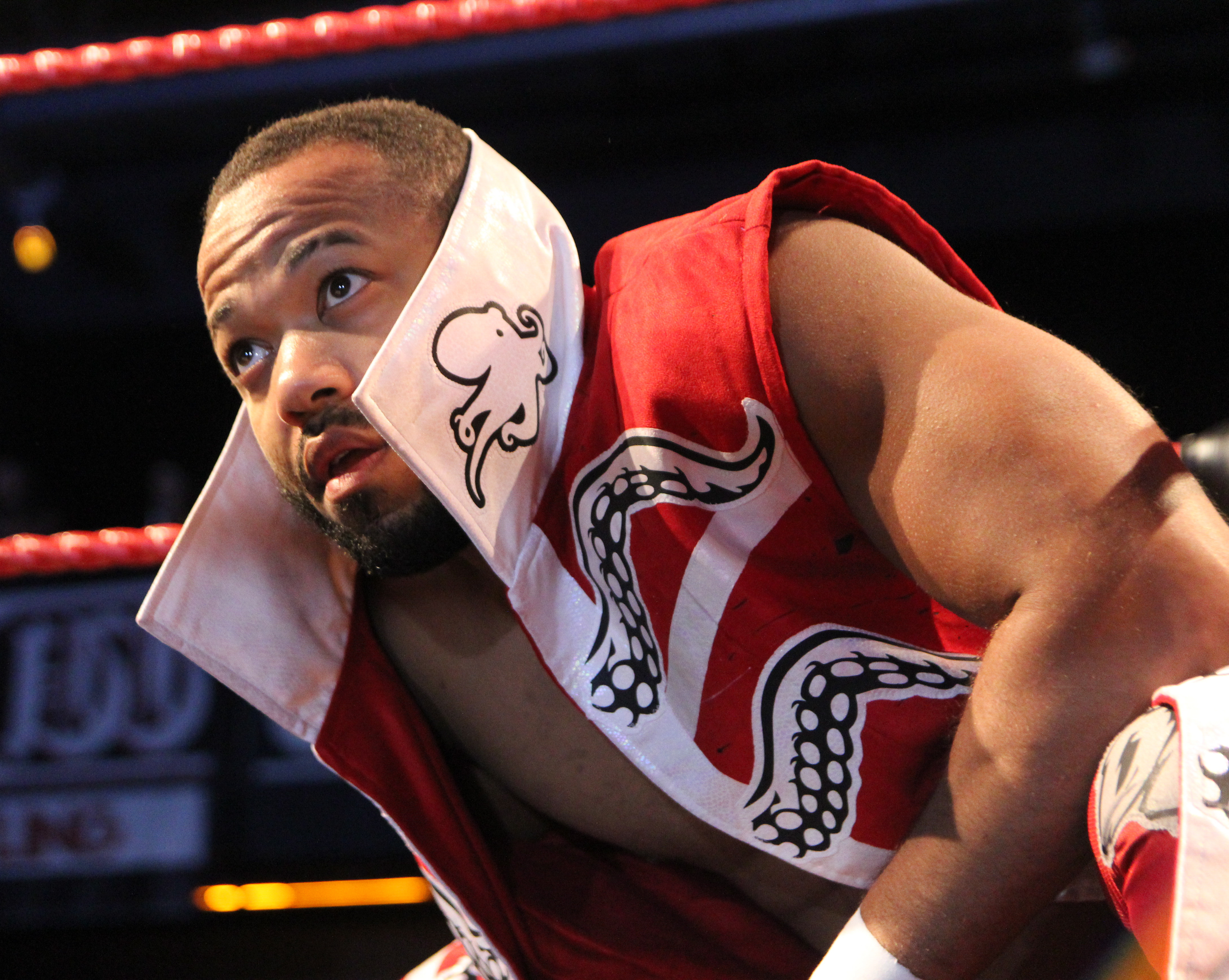
A collage of Jonathan Gresham while working in Ring of Honor Wrestling.

For most of 2020, Gresham was inactive, as ROH had taken an extended hiatus due to the COVID-19 pandemic, but when ROH resumed in August 2020, Gresham became part of a 16-man tournament to crown a new ROH Pure Champion, a title that was being revived after being retired 14 years earlier. Gresham would go on to win the tournament, defeating Tracy Williams in the finals on August 23 (airing on October 31) to win the title and become a double champion in ROH. On the November 28th, 2020 episode of Ring of Honor Wrestling, Gresham appeared with "Hot Sauce" Tracy Williams, Jay Lethal and Rhett Titus as the newly formed faction The Foundation.

In September 2021, Gresham lost the Pure Championship to Josh Woods at Death Before Dishonor XVIII. Gresham would then go on to win the vacant ROH World Championship by defeating Jay Lethal at Final Battle.

On April 1, 2022, at Supercard of Honor XV, Gresham defeated Bandido to become the undisputed ROH World Champion. During his reign, All Elite Wrestling (AEW) President and CEO Tony Khan purchased ROH. On the July 8 episode of AEW Rampage, Gresham turned heel on Lee Moriarty aligning himself with the Tully Blanchard Enterprises. This partnership proved to be short-lived as on the Zero Hour before Death Before Dishonor, Prince Nana announced he purchased all of Tully Blanchard Enterprises from Tully, which caused all members of the group, including Gresham to join Nana's group The Embassy. In the opening match, Gresham lost his ROH championship to Claudio Castagnoli. A few hours prior to the event, Gresham requested, and was granted, a release from his AEW/ROH contract.

Gresham stated in October 2026 that he has not spoken to Tony Khan since leaving AEW, despite multiple attempts from Gresham to make contact.

=== Impact Wrestling / Total Nonstop Action Wrestling (2022–2025) ===
On the December 15, 2022, episode of Impact!, Gresham made his return to Impact Wrestling, saving Delirious from an attack by Eddie Edwards. It was later confirmed that Gresham signed with Impact.

On January 13, 2023, at Hard To Kill, Gresham was defeated by Edwards. At No Surrender, Gresham defeated Mike Bailey. At Sacrifice, Gresham lost to Mike Bailey in the rematch. At Rebellion, Gresham competed in a Three-way elimination match for the Impact X Division Championship which was won by Trey Miguel. At Under Siege, Gresham competed in the Six-way match to determine the #1 contender for the Impact World Championship which was won by Alex Shelley. At Against All Odds, Gresham competed in the 8-4-1 match to determine the #1 contender to the Impact World Championship which was won by Nick Aldis. At Impact Slammiversary, Gresham competed in a 6-way Ultimate X match to determine the #1 contender to the Impact X Division Championship which was won by Kushida. At Bound for Glory, Gresham competed in the 20-person Intergender Call Your Shot Gauntlet which was won by Jordynne Grace. on the November 9 episode of Impact, Gresham lost to Alex Shelley in a TNA world championship match but failed to win the title.

At Under Siege, Gresham defeated Kushida. on the May 30 episode of Impact, Gresham defeated Sami Callihan. on the June 14 episode of Xplosion (taped), Gresham defeated Leon Slater. At Against All Odds, Gresham lost to Sami Callihan. on the July 11 episode of Impact, Gresham competed in a 3-way match for #1 contender for the X-Division title which was won by Mike Bailey. on the August 8 episode of Impact, Gresham lost to Kushida. on the August 22 episode of Impact, Gresham defeated Charlie Dempsey. on the September 26 episode of Impact, Gresham defeated Laredo Kid. on the October 18 episode of Xplosion, Gresham defeated John Skyler. on the October 24 episode of Impact, Gresham lost to Josh Alexander. At Bound for Glory, Gresham competed in the 20-person Intergender Call Your Shot Gauntlet which was won by Frankie Kazarian. on the October 31 episode of Impact, Gresham, Eric Young and Steve Maclin defeated Josh Alexander and The Good Hands (Jason Hotch and John Skyler). on the November 14 episode of Impact, Gresham, Eric Young and Steve Maclin lost to The Northern Armory (Josh Alexander, Judas Icarus and Travis Williams). on the December 5 episode of Impact, Gresham, Mike Santana, Eric Young, and Steve Maclin lost to Frankie Kazarian and The Northern Armory (Josh Alexander, Judas Icarus and Travis Williams). At Final Resolution, Gresham lost to Frankie Kazarian. on the January 9, 2025 episode of Impact, Gresham, Eric Young, and Steve Maclin defeated The System (Brian Myers, Eddie Edwards and JDC) in his last match for the company.

On January 28, 2025, Jordynne Grace confirmed that Gresham's contract with TNA had expired, and that he is now a free agent.

=== Progress Wrestling (2022) ===
In March 2022, Gresham challenged Cara Noir for the Progress Wrestling World Championship at Chapter 130. Gresham won the match and the championship after interference from Spike Trivet. After Chapter 134, Gresham was stripped of the Progress World Championship following a defence against Gene Munny in a match with the stipulation that Gresham would lose the championship if Lykos Gym (Kid Lykos and Kid Lykos II) interfered, which they did.

=== Return to Independent Circuit (2026-) ===
Gresham made his first appearance after his August 2025 strokes at a January 2026 Beyond Wrestling show. On February 2nd, 2026, Gresham wrestled Lee Moriarty to a thirty minute time limit draw at Orange Crush Presents Super Power Slam. Gresham competed in the 2026 Jersey J-Cup, defeating Adam Priest in the first round, and Darian Bengston in the Quarter Final, before losing to Charles Mason in the Semi-Final that same night.

Gresham made his return to Maple Leaf Pro Wrestling on March 28 2026 at MLP Uprising, competing in an Elimination Gauntlet Match for the Interim MLP Canadian Title, which was ultimately won by Stu Grayson.

Gresham made a number of appearances for different promotions during GCW Collective 2026, held in Las Vegas during Wrestlemania 42 weekend. On April 15 2026, He was defeated by YAMATO at DGUSA The Gate of Sin City. He was defeated by LJ Cleary at Super Havoc Pro Wrestling High Stakes that same night. Gresham competed against Hechicero for the CMLL World Heavyweight Title at MLP Multiverse on April 17, in a match won by Hechicero. Later that day, Gresham defeated TJP at Future Stars of Wrestling Killer Kross Presents Mecca XI: Killer Instinct. Gresham also wrestled in a six man tag match at ACTION We Gambled Away The Graphix Budget, alongside Erick Stevens and Zack Sabre Jr, losing to the team of Adam Priest, Fuminori Abe, and Minoru Suzuki by referee's decision.

In June 2026, Gresham appeared in the main event of PRODUCE by Orange Crush Presents: Volume 1: The Octopus, defeating Fuminori Abe. Gresham had also curated the event. He challenged Lee Moriarty for the ROH Pure Title at PRODUCE Volume 2: TAIGASTYLE, in a match won by Moriarty. At PRODUCE Volume 3: Azucar, Gresham won the 25,000 Dollar King of New York Royal Ranbo, earning the title King of New York. At PRODUCE Volume 4: Night Life, Gresham defeated Rudy Lockhart.

In September 2026, Gresham competed in and won the inaugural Pez Whatley Invitational, defeating Jordan Blade, Darius Lockhart, and Darian Bengston during the tournament.

In October 2026, Gresham was named as chairman of PRODUCE's Talent Advisory Council, a role in which he would help scout wrestlers for the promotion. That same month, at PRODUCE Volume 5: Skoden, Gresham lost to Lio Rush by disqualification. At PRODUCE Volume 6: Hell Comes to Dogtown, Gresham tagged with Adam Priest, Darien Bengtston, and Tracy Williams against Bryan Keith, El Phantasmo, Oni King, and The Blade. In November 2026, PRODUCE announced the promotion would be going on hiatus due to financial difficulties.

== Personal life ==
In December 2018, Gresham got engaged to fellow professional wrestler, Jordynne Grace. The couple married in September 2020.

On August 7, 2025, Gresham revealed that he had suffered two strokes which doctors attributed to a possible complication from the severe COVID-19 Gresham had a few weeks prior. On August 24, 2025, Grace revealed that Gresham has made a full recovery and is resuming non-wrestling training. Gresham returned to the ring in early 2026 and has continued wrestling for various promotions.

== Championships and accomplishments ==
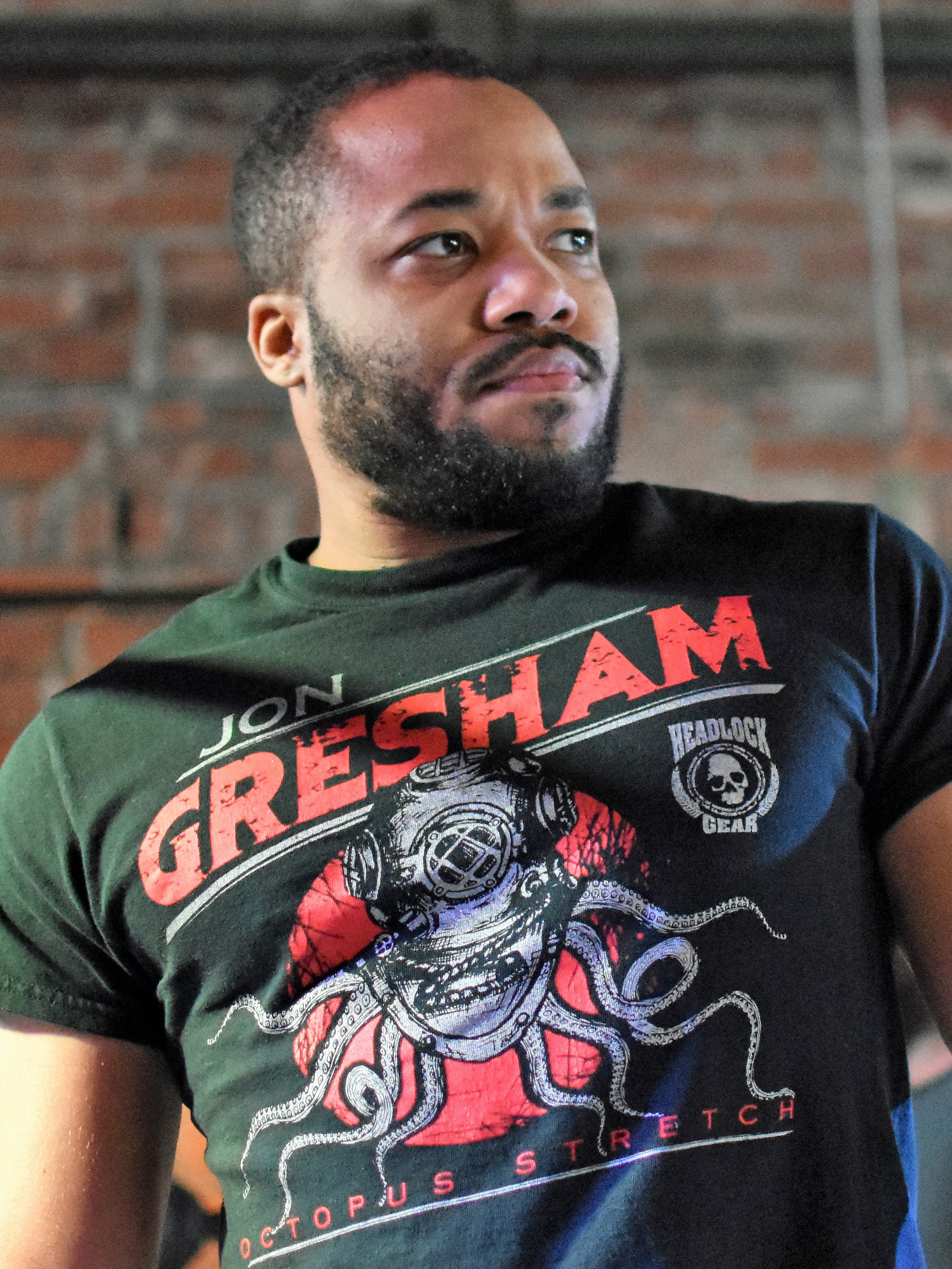
Gresham in 2018.

- Combat Zone Wrestling
  - CZW World Heavyweight Championship (1 time)
  - Best of the Best XV (2016)
- The Crash Lucha Libre
  - The Crash Cruiserweight Championship (1 time)
- Desastre Total Ultraviolento
  - DTU Alto Impacto Championship (1 time)
- Victory Ring
  - Victory Ring Championship (1 time)
- IndependentWrestling.TV/Powerbomb.tv
  - Independent Championship (1 time, inaugural)
  - Independent Championship Tournament (2017)
- International Wrestling Cartel
  - IWC Super Indy Championship (1 time)
  - Super Indy 17 (2018)
- N'Catch
  - Super N'Cup (2011)
- National Wrestling Alliance
  - NWA Mid-America X Division Championship (1 time)
- New South Pro Wrestling
  - NSPW Heavyweight Championship (1 time)
- Progress Wrestling
  - Progress Unified World Championship (1 time)
- Pro Wrestling Zero1
  - International Junior Heavyweight Championship (1 time)
  - New Wrestling Alliance World Junior Heavyweight Championship (1 time)
  - Zero1 USA Midwest X Division Championship/World Junior Heavyweight Championship (1 time)
  - Tenkaichi Junior (2012)
- Pro Wrestling Alliance
  - PWA Heavyweight Championship (1 time)
  - PWA Iron Man Championship (1 time)
- Pure Xtremely Brutal Wrestling Entertainment
  - PXBWE Tag Team Championship (1 time) – with Tim Donst
- Pro Wrestling Illustrated
  - Ranked No. 10 of the top 500 singles wrestlers in the PWI 500 in 2022
- Ring of Honor
  - ROH Pure Championship (1 time)
  - ROH World Championship (1 time)
  - ROH World Tag Team Championship (1 time) – with Jay Lethal
  - ROH Pure Championship Tournament (2020)
  - ROH Year-End Award (5 times)
    - Tag Team of the Year (2020) – with Jay Lethal
    - Faction of the Year (2020) – with The Foundation (Jay Lethal, Rhett Titus, & Tracy Williams)
    - Match of the Year (2020) – vs. Tracy Williams (ROH Pure Tournament Finals)
    - Wrestler of the Year (2020)
    - Wrestler of the Year (2021)
  - Sixth Triple Crown Champion
- Sports Illustrated
  - Ranked No. 10 of the top 10 wrestlers in 2021
- Westside Xtreme Wrestling
  - wXw World Tag Team Championship (1 time) – with Jay Skillet
  - DTU Alto Impacto Title #1 Contendership Tournament (2015)
  - 16 Carat Gold Tournament (2022)
- WWA4 Wrestling School
  - WWA4 Heavyweight Championship (1 time)
  - WWA4 Internet Championship (1 time)
  - WWA4 Tag Team Championship (1 time) – with Ric King
