= Kushida (wrestler) =

Japanese professional wrestler (born 1983)

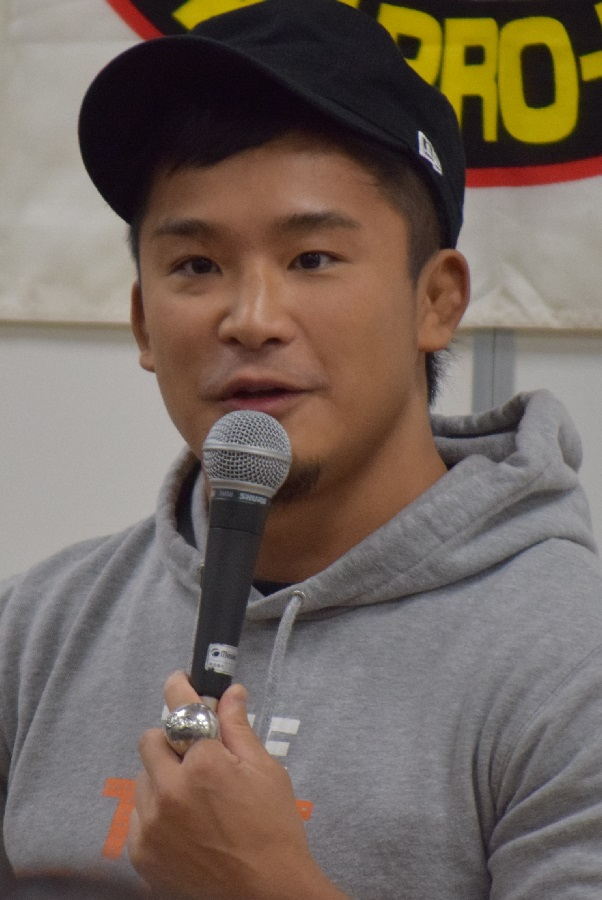
- Kushida in 2017

Personal information
- Born: Yujiro Kushida; May 12, 1983 (age 43) Ōta, Tokyo, Japan

Professional wrestling career
- Ring name(s): Kushida; Yujiro; Yujiro Kushida
- Billed height: 1.75 m (5 ft 9 in)
- Billed weight: 85 kg (187 lb)
- Billed from: Tokyo, Japan
- Trained by: Can-Am Wrestling School; El Oriental; Hiroshi Tanahashi; Kazushi Sakuraba; Nobuhiko Takada; Scott D'Amore; Takada Dojo; Takumi Adachi; Yoshihiro Tajiri
- Debut: September 16, 2005
- Martial arts career
- Height: 5 ft 9 in (175 cm)
- Weight: 154 lb (70 kg; 11 st 0 lb)
- Division: Lightweight
- Style: Shoot style
- Stance: Orthodox
- Fighting out of: Tokyo, Japan
- Team: Takada Dojo
- Trainer: Takumi Adachi

Mixed martial arts record
- Total: 8
- Wins: 6
- By submission: 2
- By decision: 3
- By disqualification: 1
- Draws: 2

Yujiro Kushida (櫛田 雄二郎, Kushida Yūjirō; born May 12, 1983), better known mononymouslyous as Kushida (stylized in all caps), is a Japanese professional wrestler, trainer, and former mixed martial artist, He is signed to New Japan Pro-Wrestling (NJPW). He also makes appearances for Major League Wrestling (MLW), where he is a member of Contra Unit.

He is best known for his tenures with NJPW, where he is a former six-time IWGP Junior Heavyweight Champion and a four-time IWGP Junior Heavyweight Tag Team Champion (twice with Time Splitters teammate Alex Shelley and twice with Kevin Knight). He was the winner of the 2015 and 2017 Best of the Super Juniors tournaments, the 2016 Super J-Cup, and the 2017 Pro Wrestling World Cup, a tournament co-promoted by NJPW with What Culture Pro Wrestling (WCPW) and Revolution Pro Wrestling (RevPro). Kushida previously made appearances for NJPW's American partner Ring of Honor (ROH), where he is a former ROH World Television Champion. In 2019, Kushida signed with WWE, who assigned him to perform on the 205 Live and NXT brands. In WWE, he is a former one-time NXT Cruiserweight Champion. In 2022, he departed from WWE and returned to NJPW; he signed with TNA (then known as Impact Wrestling) in December of that same year.

Kushida began training for a mixed martial arts (MMA) career at Nobuhiko Takada's Takada Dojo while in junior high school. He made his professional MMA debut in 2003 for the ZST promotion, winning the following year's ZST Genesis Lightweight Tournament. In 2005, he retired from MMA, ending his career with an undefeated record.

== Mixed martial artis career ==
Kushida joined Nobuhiko Takada's Takada Dojo during his junior high school years, where he started learning both professional wrestling and mixed martial arts (MMA) under Takumi Adachi. He had his MMA debut five years later for ZST, defeating Kenji Mizuno by disqualification after the latter grabbed the ropes to defend a takedown. Kushida followed his debut with a draw, a win, and a three-match tournament victory at the 2004 ZST Genesis Lightweight Tournament. Around the same time, he held a part-time job with the Tokyo Sports magazine and began attending Senshu University.

His performance in the tournament earned him offers from multiple MMA promotions, but he would turn them down instead choosing to embark on a professional wrestling career.

== Professional wrestling career ==
=== Early career (2005) ===
Soon after his final MMA fight, Kushida was granted a one-year temporary absence from the Senshu University, during which he would travel to Mexico with money borrowed from his mother. In Mexico, he learned the style of lucha libre under Oriental in his Aztec Budokan wrestling school, where he had his professional debut on September 16, 2005, as the masked wrestler Yujiro. This Mexican endeavour is not acknowledged by many wrestling sites, which label his first match in Hustle as his professional wrestling debut.

=== Hustle (2006–2009) ===
Kushida returned to Japan on February 10, 2006, and signed up with his trainer Takada's promotion Hustle after being scouted by Tajiri and Hiroshi Nagao. Tajiri eventually took Kushida under his wing. Kushida debuted as a pro wrestler on September 7, 2006, with Tajiri to take on Red Onigumo and Blue Onigumo. Kushida quickly earned the title "Hustle Supernova" and became one of the top up-and-comers of the babyface faction Hustle Army, forming a team with Tajiri and fellow apprentice Banzai Chie. Kushida and Chie, assisted by guest tarento Hitomi Kaikawa, entered a feud with villainous Monster Army member Giant Vabo (Nagao), but they were mostly unsuccessful. Moreover, their alliance with Tajiri broke up when he was brainwashed in a storyline by Yinling into joining Monster Army, so they enlisted Ryoji Sai to help them to turn Tajiri back into his former self. They eventually brought Tajiri back to his senses in 2007, returning to their usual trios matches.

In 2009, Kushida got into a heated rivalry with his Monster Army counterpart, NWA International Junior Heavyweight Champion Ray Ohara. Kushida faced Ohara several times for his title, but was defeated each time despite Tajiri's best efforts to help him. Ohara allied himself with Minoru Fujita as his mentor to counter Tajiri, and stipulated a last title match in which Kushida would put his Hustle career in line. Kushida accepted, but was defeated due to a miscommunication with Tajiri, forcing him to abandon the Hustle Army and the promotion itself.

=== All Japan Pro Wrestling and Osaka Pro Wrestling (2007–2008) ===
Kushida started competing in All Japan Pro Wrestling in July 2007, wrestling against Ryuji Hijikata and T28. In February 2008, Kushida teamed up with T28 to participate in the U-30 Tag Team Tournament, a one night tournament that featured AJPW's top young wrestlers. The team defeated CJ Otis and Mototsugu Shimizu in the first round, Kaji Yamato and Taishi Takizawa in the second round and the team of Daichi Kakimoto and Manabu Soya in the finals to win the U30 Tag Team tournament. The team would go on to compete in AJPW's 2008 Junior Tag League, the team ended up tied for last place with only four points for two victories and three losses.

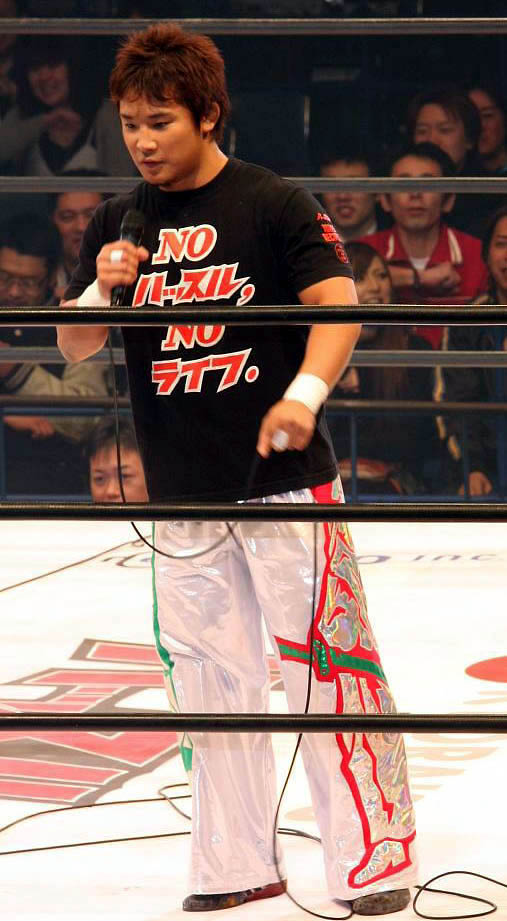
Kushida in 2008

Kushida and Tajiri competed in Osaka Festival 2008 and reached the semi-final of the tournament but were knocked out by Daisuke Harada and Zeus. Kushida also competed in the Mondo 21 Cup 13-man battle royal. On 12 June, Kushida won his first three-way dance against Kuishinbo Kamen and Kanjyuro Matsuyama. After teaming up with Billyken Kid and defeating Takoyakida and Tigers Mask, Kushida went on a winning streak at Osaka Pro Wrestling in both singles and tag team matches which is still intact today.

=== North America promotions (2009–2010, 2016) ===
In March 2009, Kushida faced Rey Ohara in a loss that marked a turning point in his career, as the stipulations forced him to leave Japan. Kushida went on to compete in wrestling promotions in Canada, Mexico, and the United States, most notably Chikara and Border City Wrestling. Kushida participated in a steel cage match for the BSE Suicide Six Pack title in which he was defeated by Tyson Dux. On November 3, 2010, while competing for Canadian Wrestling's Elite, he challenged for the CWE Championship against AJ Sanchez, but failed to win the title. Kushida won his last match in Canada, defeating Michael Von Payton at Capital City Championship Combat on March 13, 2010. In October 2010, Kushida made two appearances for American promotion Ohio Valley Wrestling (OVW).

On June 1, 2016, the Mexican Consejo Mundial de Lucha Libre (CMLL) promotion announced Kushida as a participant in the 2016 International Gran Prix. On June 25, Kushida made it to the semifinals of Lucha Libre Elite's World Championship tournament, before losing to Volador Jr. On July 1, Kushida took part in the 2016 International Gran Prix, from which he was eliminated by La Máscara. On July 8, Kushida unsuccessfully challenged Volador Jr. for the NWA World Historic Welterweight Championship. On July 12, Kushida and Marco Corleone won a one-night tag team tournament, defeating Rey Escorpión and Shocker in the finals. The tournament concluded his Mexican tour.

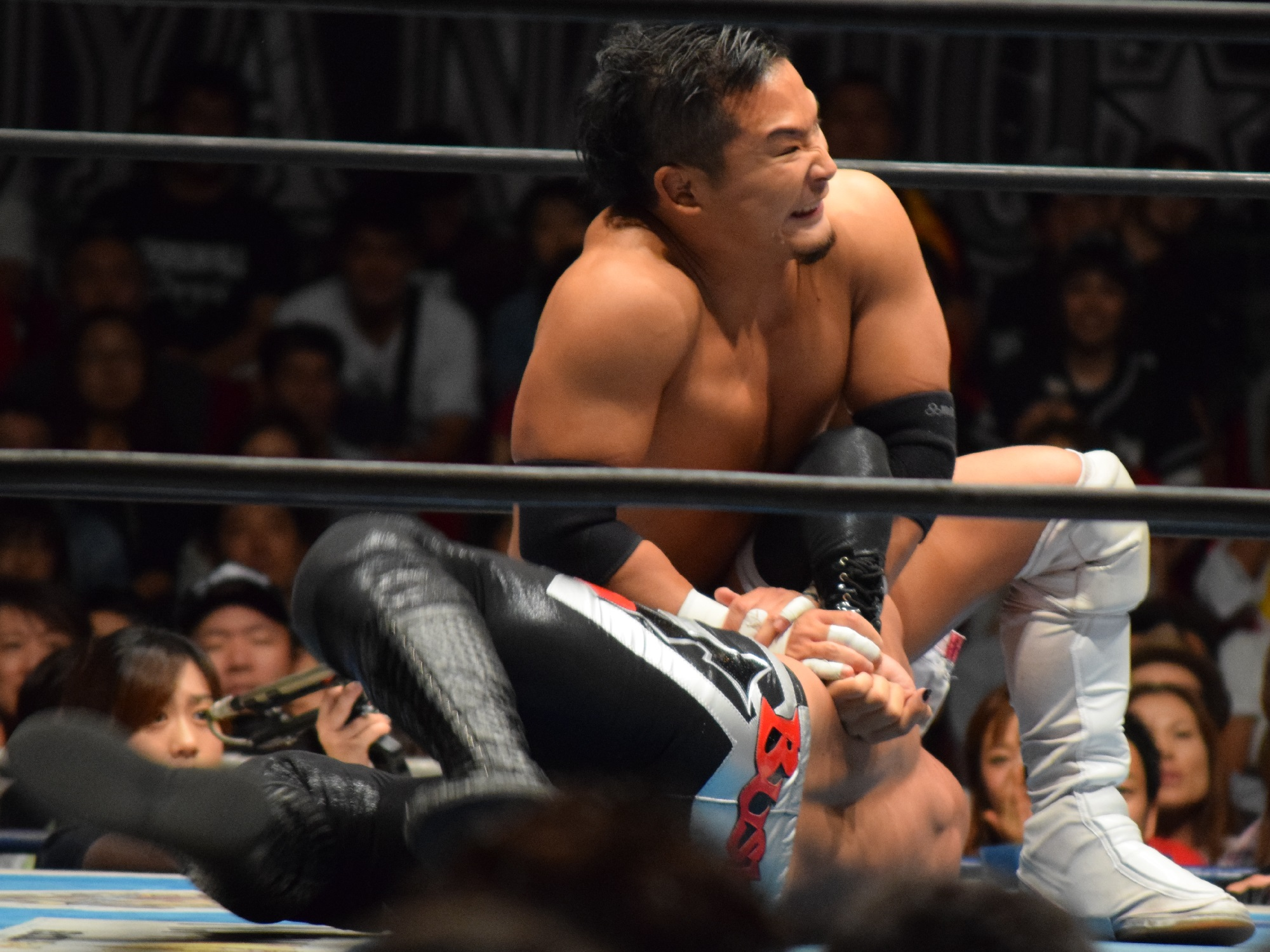
Kushida applying the Hoverboard Lock on Bushi

=== Smash (2010–2012) ===
Kushida was in the main event at Smash.1 where he defeated Hajime Ohara, and went on to team with Lin Byron to defeat Ohara and Syuri in the main event of Smash.2. Kushida lost to Prince Devitt in Smash.3's main event. Kushida defeated Isami Kodaka in a world tryout match on Smash.4, only to lose his next three matches for the promotion. He ended his losing streak alongside Tajiri and Akira Shoji with a victory against Ohara, Jessica Love, and Kageman Guro at Smash.8. At Smash.9, Kushida challenged Mike Mondo for the OVW Heavyweight Championship, but lost. At Smash.10 Kushida participated in his first hardcore match, teaming with Super Crazy and Isami Kodaka to defeat Hajime Ohara, Heimo Ukonselkä, and Jessica Love. Kushida's initial run with Smash ended on March 31, 2011, at Smash.15, where he was defeated by Ohara. On March 14, 2012, Kushida returned to Smash to compete in the promotion's final event, in a victory over Yusuke Kodama.

=== New Japan Pro-Wrestling (2010–2019) ===
==== First storylines (2010–2012) ====
Kushida participated in the annual Best of the Super Juniors tournament, which began on May 30, 2010. He participated in seven matches winning four out of them, giving him a total of eight points, just coming shy of the semi-finals. Kushida also participated in the new tag team tournament called Super J Tag Tournament, Kushida partnered with Gedo. The pair first went up against Kota Ibushi and Austin Creed, Kushida pinned Austin to advance to the semi-final. However the pair lost to Ryusuke Taguchi and Prince Devitt in the semi-final so were out of the tournament. Kushida then went on to team up with Hiroshi Tanahashi and Tajiri to compete in J Sports Crown Openweight 6 Man Tag Tournament 2010, the team beat Chaos to progress to the finals where they were eventually beaten by Hirooki Goto, Prince Devitt, and Ryusuke Taguchi. Kushida participated in Super J Tag League teaming up with Akira in block B, the pair won two matches and lost two matches amassing a total of four points, missing out on the final by two points.

On February 25, 2011, it was announced that Kushida, with Tajiri's blessing, would be leaving Smash and becoming a full-time member of the New Japan roster, beginning on April 1. On March 19 Kushida unsuccessfully challenged Prince Devitt for the IWGP Junior Heavyweight Championship. On May 26, Kushida entered the 2011 Best of the Super Juniors tournament. After winning five out of his eight-round robin stage matches, he finished fourth out of the nine wrestlers in his block, narrowly missing the semifinals of the tournament. Kushida then went on to compete in J Sports Crown Openweight 6 Man Tag Tournament 2011 with Hiroshi Tanahashi and Máscara Dorada, however the trio were beaten in the second round by Jyushin Thunder Liger, Karl Anderson and Giant Bernard. On August 27, 2011, he participated in the Destroyer Cup, a special battle royal at All Together. On September 19, Kushida was set to challenge Kota Ibushi for the IWGP Junior Heavyweight Championship, but a week earlier, Ibushi was forced to pull out of the match and vacate the title, after dislocating his left shoulder. Kushida was then booked in a decision match against former champion Prince Devitt to determine a new champion. On September 19, Kushida was defeated by Prince Devitt in a match for the vacant IWGP Junior Heavyweight Championship. On November 12 at Power Struggle, Kushida and Tiger Mask unsuccessfully challenged Davey Richards and Rocky Romero for the IWGP Junior Heavyweight Tag Team Championship.

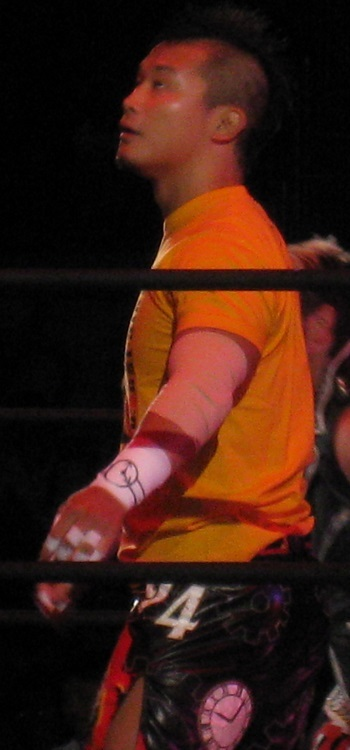
Kushida in September 2013

At Wrestle Kingdom VI, Kushida participated in his first match on January 4 Dome Show by teaming up with Jyushin Thunder Liger, Tiger Mask IV and Mascara Dorada to defeat Atlantis, Valiente and Suzuki-gun (Taichi and Taka Michinoku). Liger won the match by pinning Valiente. On January 21, Kushida returned after the NJPW break period to take part in the Fantastica Mania 2012 events, teaming with Hirooki Goto, beating Máscara Dorada and Rush. The second night Kushida lost to Máscara Dorada in a match for the CMLL World Welterweight Championship. At The New Beginning, Kushida along with Seigigun (Wataru Inoue and Yuji Nagata), Tiger Mask & Togi Makabe were defeated in a ten-man tag team elimination match by Suzuki-gun (Lance Archer, Minoru Suzuki, Taichi, Taka Michinoku and Yoshihiro Takayama). On 27 May, Kushida entered the 2012 Best of the Super Juniors tournament, after a strong start beating three of his first four opponents, which included Prince Devitt, Kushida would go on to lose most of his remaining matches which, in the end, gave him eight points, once again narrowly missing out on the semi-final. On July 22, Kushida picked up a big win, when he defeated IWGP Junior Heavyweight Champion Low Ki in a non-title match. However, Low Ki was first scheduled to defend his title against Kota Ibushi and when, on July 29, Ibushi became the new champion, Kushida stepped up and challenged him to the title match originally scheduled for September 2011. On August 26, Kushida returned to the United States, when he wrestled at a Sacramento Wrestling Federation (SWF) event in Gridley, California, battling SWF Champion Dave Dutra to a time limit draw.

==== Time Splitters (2012–2015) ====
During the American trip, Kushida also formed a new partnership with Alex Shelley, saving him from IWGP Junior Heavyweight Tag Team Champions, Forever Hooligans (Alex Koslov and Rocky Romero). On September 7, Kushida took on Ibushi in a match for the IWGP Junior Heavyweight Championship and lost. On October 8 at King of Pro-Wrestling, Kushida and Alex Shelley unsuccessfully challenged Forever Hooligans for the IWGP Junior Heavyweight Tag Team Championship. On October 21, the Time Splitters entered the 2012 Super Jr. Tag Tournament, defeating Jado & Gedo in their first round match. On November 2, Kushida and Shelley defeated Suzuki-gun (Taichi and Taka Michinoku) to advance to the finals, where, later that same day, they defeated Apollo 55 (Prince Devitt and Ryusuke Taguchi) to win the tournament and become the number one contenders to the IWGP Junior Heavyweight Tag Team Championship. On November 11 at Power Struggle, the Time Splitters defeated Forever Hooligans in a rematch to win the IWGP Junior Heavyweight Tag Team Championship, Kushida's first title in New Japan. On November 15, Kushida participated in the NEVER Openweight Championship tournament and was eliminated by Masato Tanaka. Time Splitters made their first successful title defense on February 10, 2013, at The New Beginning, defeating Forever Hooligans in the third title match between the two teams. Their second successful defense took place on March 3 at New Japan's 41st anniversary event, where they defeated Jyushin Thunder Liger and Tiger Mask IV. On April 7 at Invasion Attack, Time Splitters defeated Apollo 55 for their third successful title defense. On May 3 at Wrestling Dontaku 2013, Time Splitters lost the IWGP Junior Heavyweight Tag Team Championship back to the Forever Hooligans in their fourth defense.

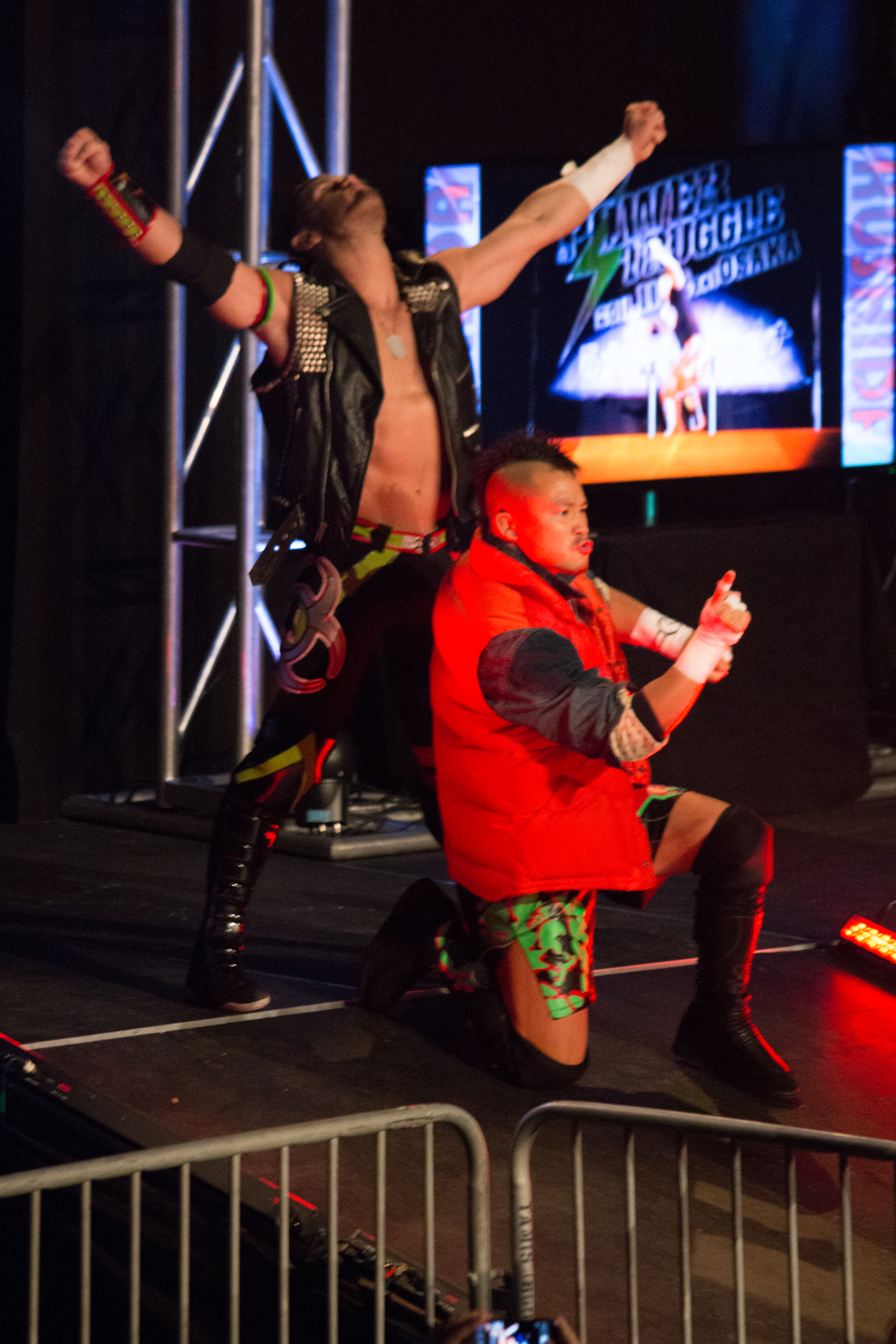
Kushida and Alex Shelley as the Time Splitters in May 2014

From late May to early June, Kushida took part in the 2013 Best of the Super Juniors, where he managed to win four out of his eight matches with a loss to Kenny Omega in his final match on June 6 costing him a spot in the semifinals of the tournament. On June 22 at Dominion 6.22, Time Splitters failed in their attempt to regain the IWGP Junior Heavyweight Tag Team Championship from the Forever Hooligans. On July 18, American promotion Ring of Honor (ROH) announced that Kushida would be making his debut for the promotion on August 3 in Toronto, Canada. Kushida defeated Adam Page in his debut match for the promotion. Back in New Japan, Kushida and Shelley defeated Suzuki-gun (Taichi and Taka Michinoku) on September 29 at Destruction to earn another shot at the Forever Hooligans and the IWGP Junior Heavyweight Tag Team Championship. However, Time Splitters were forced to back out of the title match, after Shelley was sidelined with a back injury. Shelley returned from his injury on January 4, 2014, at Wrestle Kingdom 8 in Tokyo Dome, where the Time Splitters unsuccessfully challenged The Young Bucks for the IWGP Junior Heavyweight Tag Team Championship in a four-way match, which also included Forever Hooligans and Suzuki-gun. Time Splitters were victorious in a non-title rematch the following day, after which they asserted themselves as The Young Bucks' next challengers. They received their title shot on February 11 at The New Beginning in Osaka, but were again defeated by The Young Bucks. In March, Kushida took part in German promotion Westside Xtreme Wrestling's (wXw) 16 Carat Gold weekend. On April 12, during New Japan's trip to Taiwan, Kushida unsuccessfully challenged Tomohiro Ishii for the NEVER Openweight Championship. Time Splitters received another shot at the IWGP Junior Heavyweight Tag Team Championship on May 10 at Global Wars, a special event co-produced by NJPW and ROH in Toronto, but were defeated by The Young Bucks in a three-way match, also involving Forever Hooligans. At the second NJPW/ROH event, War of the Worlds on May 17, Kushida unsuccessfully challenged Jay Lethal for the ROH World Television Championship. On May 30, Kushida entered the 2014 Best of the Super Juniors tournament, where he won his block with a record of five wins and two losses, advancing to the semifinals. On June 8, Kushida defeated Taichi to advance to the finals of the tournament, where he was defeated by Ricochet. On June 21 at Dominion 6.21, Time Splitters defeated The Young Bucks to win the IWGP Junior Heavyweight Tag Team Championship for the second time. On July 4 at Kizuna Road 2014, Kushida became a double champion, when he defeated Kota Ibushi for the IWGP Junior Heavyweight Championship. On August 10, Time Splitters made their first successful defense of the IWGP Junior Heavyweight Tag Team Championship against the ROH tag team reDRagon (Bobby Fish and Kyle O'Reilly). On September 21 at Destruction in Kobe, Kushida lost the IWGP Junior Heavyweight Championship to Ryusuke Taguchi in his first defense. Two days later at Destruction in Okayama, Time Splitters made their second successful defense of the IWGP Junior Heavyweight Tag Team Championship against Suzuki-gun (El Desperado and Taichi). On October 13 at King of Pro-Wrestling, Time Splitters made their third successful title defense in a three-way match against Forever Hooligans and The Young Bucks. On November 8 at Power Struggle, Time Splitters lost the title to 2014 Super Jr. Tag Tournament winners reDRagon. On December 7, Kushida returned to ROH at Final Battle 2014, where he and Shelley unsuccessfully challenged reDRagon for the ROH World Tag Team Championship. Time Splitters received a rematch for the IWGP Junior Heavyweight Tag Team Championship on January 4, 2015, at Wrestle Kingdom 9 in Tokyo Dome, in a four-way match also involving Forever Hooligans and The Young Bucks, but were again defeated by reDRagon. On February 11 at The New Beginning in Osaka, Time Splitters received another title shot in a three-way match, but were this time defeated by The Young Bucks, who became the new champions.

In May, Kushida entered the 2015 Best of the Super Juniors tournament. He finished his block on June 3 with a record of six wins and one loss. Despite others in the block having as many as two matches left to wrestle, Kushida secured the top spot in the block and a place in the finals. Kushida's early qualifying to the finals happened due to his Time Splitters partner Alex Shelley being forced to pull out of their last scheduled match against each other due to a foot injury.

==== IWGP Junior Heavyweight Champion (2015–2019) ====
On June 7, 2015, Kushida defeated Kyle O'Reilly in the finals to win the 2015 Best of the Super Juniors and earn a shot at the IWGP Junior Heavyweight Championship. On July 5 at Dominion 7.5 in Osaka-jo Hall, Kushida defeated Kenny Omega to win the IWGP Junior Heavyweight Championship for the second time. He made his first successful title defense on August 16 against the winner of the 2014 Best of the Super Juniors, Ricochet. On August 21, Kushida returned to ROH, losing to Matt Sydal in a non-title match, after which he agreed to defend his title against Sydal. On September 23 at Destruction in Okayama, Kushida lost the title back to Kenny Omega. Four days later at Destruction in Kobe, Kushida and the returning Alex Shelley unsuccessfully challenged reDRagon for the IWGP Junior Heavyweight Tag Team Championship. On January 4, 2016, at Wrestle Kingdom 10 in Tokyo Dome, Kushida defeated Kenny Omega to regain the IWGP Junior Heavyweight Championship. He made his first successful title defense on February 14 at The New Beginning in Niigata against Bushi. Kushida's second title defense took place on March 12 at an ROH event in Philadelphia, where he defeated A. C. H. On April 10 at Invasion Attack 2016, Kushida defeated the debuting Will Ospreay for his third successful defense. His fourth defense took place on May 3 at Wrestling Dontaku 2016, where he defeated veteran wrestler Jyushin Thunder Liger. Later in the month, Kushida entered the 2016 Best of the Super Juniors. Finishing with a record of four wins and three losses, he was eliminated from the tournament after losing to Bushi in his final round-robin match. On June 19 at Dominion 6.19 in Osaka-jo Hall, Kushida defeated Best of the Super Juniors winner Will Ospreay for his fifth successful title defense. On July 20, Kushida entered the 2016 Super J-Cup tournament, defeating Pro Wrestling Noah representative Taiji Ishimori in his first round match. On August 21, Kushida first defeated another Noah representative, Kenoh, in the second round and then two Suzuki-gun representatives, Taichi and Yoshinobu Kanemaru, in the semifinals and finals, respectively, to win the 2016 Super J-Cup.

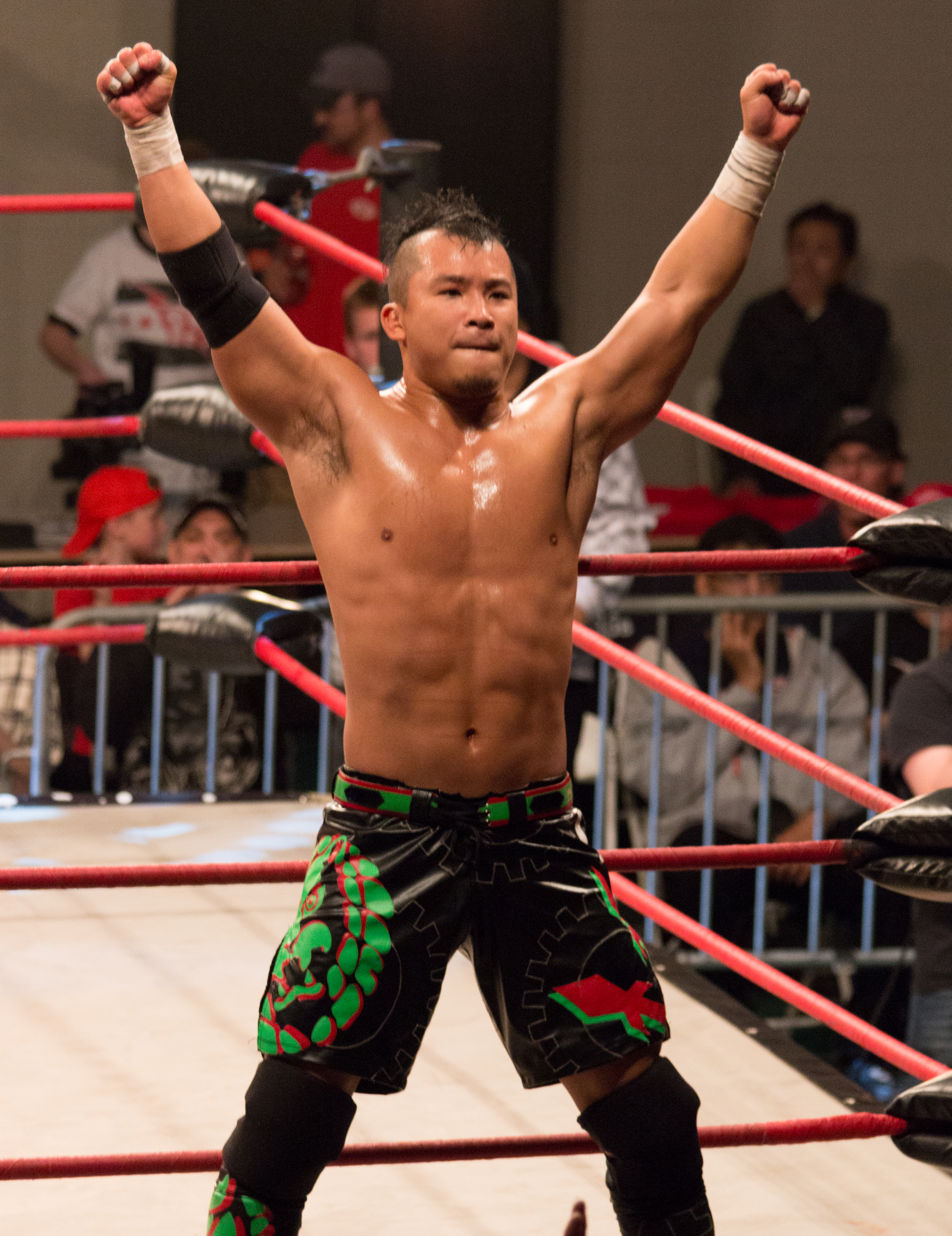
Kushida in May 2014

On September 17 at Destruction in Tokyo, Kushida lost the IWGP Junior Heavyweight Championship to Bushi. Kushida regained the title from Bushi on November 5 at Power Struggle. He lost the title to Hiromu Takahashi on January 4, 2017, at Wrestle Kingdom 11 in Tokyo Dome. Kushida received his title rematch against Takahashi on April 9 at Sakura Genesis 2017, but was defeated in less than two minutes. The following month, Kushida took part in the NJPW and ROH co-produced War of the Worlds tour. On the final night of the tour, May 14, Kushida defeated Marty Scurll to become the new ROH World Television Champion. Upon his return to Japan, Kushida entered the 2017 Best of the Super Juniors, where he won his block with a record of four wins and three losses, advancing to the finals. On June 3, Kushida defeated Will Ospreay in the finals to win his second Best of the Super Juniors. On June 11 at Dominion 6.11 in Osaka-jo Hall, Kushida defeated Hiromu Takahashi to win the IWGP Junior Heavyweight Championship for the fifth time. On September 22, Kushida returned to ROH at Death Before Dishonor XV, where he lost the ROH World Television Championship to Kenny King. On October 9 at King of Pro-Wrestling, Kushida lost the IWGP Junior Heavyweight Championship to Will Ospreay. At Wrestle Kingdom on January 4, 2018, he failed to regain the title from Marty Scurll in a four-way match that also included Hiromu Takahashi and Will Ospreay, who won the championship by pinning Scurll. Kushida got another rematch for the title on May 4 at Wrestling Dontaku, but was again defeated by Ospreay. Around this time, he began helping Jushin Liger & Togi Makabe train the Young Lions in New Japan’s Dojo, and attended the LA Dojo’s opening tryout class. Later that month, he entered the 2018 Best of the Super Juniors tournament. He finished the tournament with 4 wins and 3 losses, failing to advance to the finals. After the IWGP Junior Heavyweight Championship was vacated when Hiromu Takahashi suffered a neck injury during a successful title defense against Dragon Lee at the G1 Special In San Francisco, Kushida was entered into a four-man tournament to crown a new champion. He defeated BUSHI in the semifinals on September 23 at Destruction In Kobe and would go on to face the other semifinalist Marty Scurll at King Of Pro-Wrestling on October 8, whom he defeated at the event to win the IWGP Junior Heavyweight Championship for the sixth time. However, he lost the title against Taiji Ishimori at Wrestle Kingdom 13. On January 7, 2019, it was announced that Kushida would be leaving New Japan Pro-Wrestling. On January 29 at Road To The New Beginning, Kushida wrestled his final NJPW match, being defeated by Hiroshi Tanahashi.

=== Consejo Mundial de Lucha Libre (2016, 2025) ===
On June 1, 2016, the Mexican Consejo Mundial de Lucha Libre (CMLL) promotion announced Kushida as a participant in the 2016 International Gran Prix. On June 25, Kushida made it to the semifinals of Lucha Libre Elite's World Championship tournament, before losing to Volador Jr. On July 1, Kushida took part in the 2016 International Gran Prix, from which he was eliminated by La Máscara. On July 8, Kushida unsuccessfully challenged Volador Jr. for the NWA World Historic Welterweight Championship. On July 12, Kushida and Marco Corleone won a one-night tag team tournament, defeating Rey Escorpión and Shocker in the finals. The tournament concluded his Mexican tour.

=== WWE (2019–2022) ===
==== Signing and debut (2019–2020) ====
After months of rumored interest in Kushida by American promotion WWE, the wrestler's signing was officially announced at a press conference in New York City a few days before WrestleMania 35 in April 2019. On April 5, Kushida appeared in the crowd at NXT TakeOver: New York, making his debut for NXT in the process. On the May 1 episode of NXT, Kushida made his in-ring debut in a winning effort against Kassius Ohno. Kushida appeared on the September 10 episode of 205 Live, teaming with Gentleman Jack Gallagher to defeat Akira Tozawa and The Brian Kendrick. On the January 1, 2020, episode of NXT, the participants for the Dusty Rhodes Tag Team Classic were revealed, with Kushida being announced along with a mystery partner. On January 8, Alex Shelley was announced as Kushida's partner, reforming the Time Splitters tag team for the first time since 2015. On January 15, Time Splitters were eliminated in the first round after being defeated by NXT UK's Grizzled Young Veterans (James Drake and Zack Gibson) That reunion was one-off.

==== NXT Cruiserweight Champion (2020–2021) ====
On April 12, Kushida was named a participant in the Interim NXT Cruiserweight Championship round-robin tournament. Kushida defeated Tony Nese in his first match and Jake Atlas in his second match, but lost to Drake Maverick in third match. A triple threat match was set up between Kushida, Maverick and Atlas, as all three men were tied at 2-1, and Maverick won the match after pinning Atlas albeit in a controversial fashion. On the August 12 episode of NXT, Kushida lost to Cameron Grimes in a triple threat match also involving Velveteen Dream. After the match, he was attacked by Dream, starting a feud between the two. Kushida returned on the September 8 episode of NXT and attacked Dream. This led to a match at NXT TakeOver 31, where Kushida won. In January 2021, Kushida began to pursue the North American Champion Johnny Gargano, beginning a feud with him. On February 4, it was announced that he would face Gargano for the title at NXT TakeOver: Vengeance Day. At the event, Kushida failed to capture the title from Gargano. Following this, Kushida would begin a feud with Pete Dunne and at NXT Takeover: Stand & Deliver, Kushida would be defeated by Dunne.

On the April 13 episode of NXT, Kushida would defeat Santos Escobar in an open challenge match to win the NXT Cruiserweight Championship, thus marking his first title in WWE career. Kushida would issue an open challenge for his NXT Cruiserweight Title on the April 20 episode of NXT, facing Oney Lorcan in a winning effort. On the May 11 episode, Kushida would successfully defend the title in a rematch against Escobar in a two-out-of-three falls match. Kushida would also defend the title against newcomer, Carmelo Hayes on the June 1 episode in a winning effort. Kushida would once more defend the title against Trey Baxter on the June 15 episode and following the match would be challenged by Kyle O'Reilly to a non-title match the following week to which Kushida accepted. The following episode, Kushida would be defeated by O'Reilly and after the match, would be blindsided by a returning Roderick Strong and his stable, The Diamond Mine. Kushida lost the title to Roderick Strong on the September 21 episode of NXT 2.0.

==== Jacket Time (2021–2022) ====
Kushida eventually formed a team with Ikemen Jiro, due to the pair both having issues with The Diamond Mine, deciding on the name Jacket Time. Kushida would return to the ring on the November 5 episode of 205 Live, teaming with Jiro in a losing effort against The Grizzled Young Veterans after a distraction from The Creed Brothers. Jacket Time's feud with The Diamond Mine would culminate in a Six Man Tag Team Match after Diamond Mine leader Roderick Strong got involved, along with Odyssey Jones. Jacket Time and Jones would come out on top in the match, before Jacket Time were announced as participants in the 2022 Dusty Rhodes Tag Team Classic. However, Jacket Time were eliminated in the first round by 2021 winners MSK (Nash Carter and Wes Lee), on the January 25 episode of NXT 2.0. On April 18, 2022, Kushida left WWE after his contract expired.

=== Return to NJPW (2022–present) ===
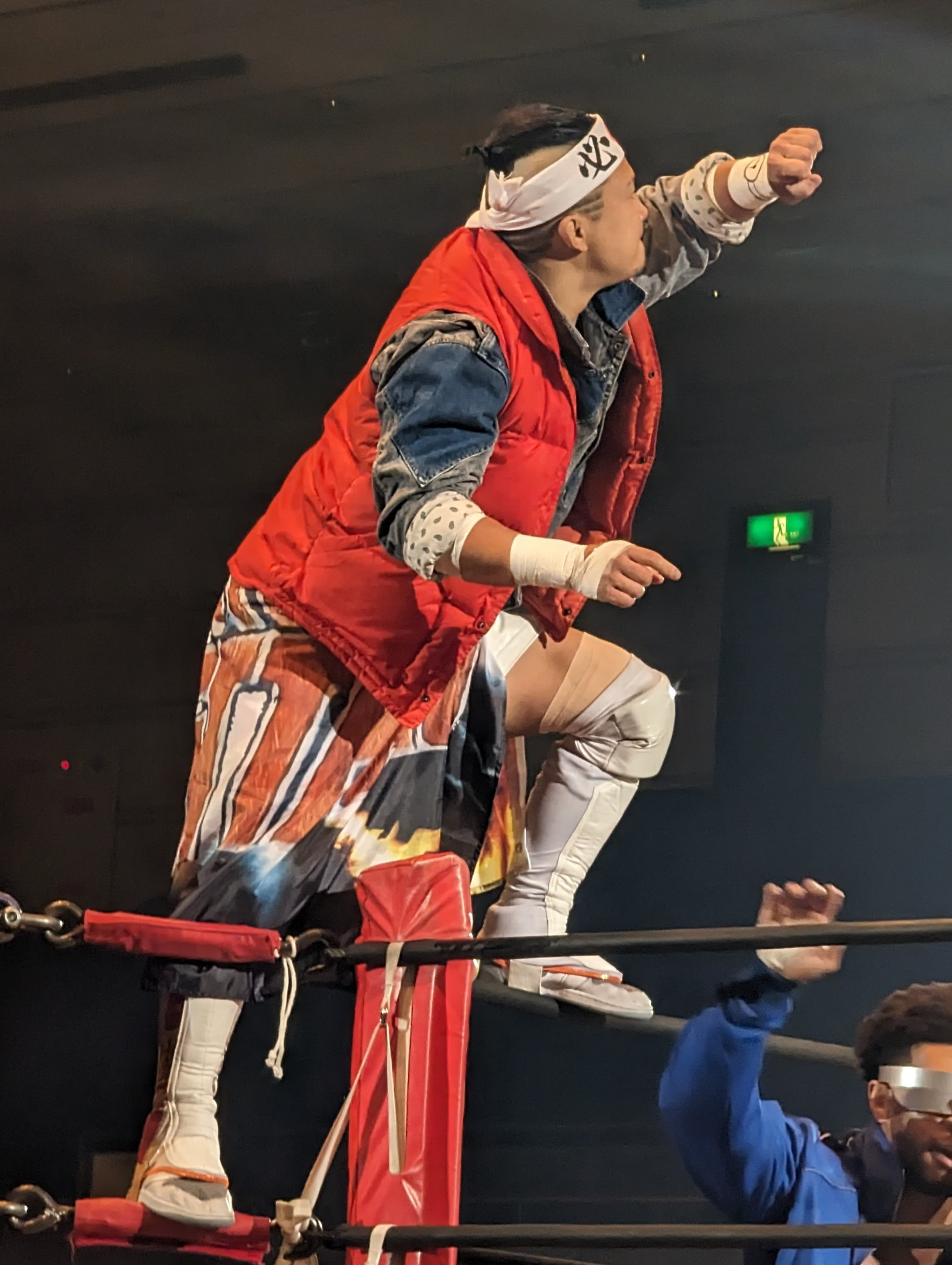
Kushida in November 2023

Kushida returned to NJPW on June 21, 2022, during the promotion's New Japan Road event. At the event, Kushida revealed that he had re-signed with NJPW and announced his intentions to "spend the rest of his career with the company". Later in 2022, Kushida began appearing for NJPW's American-based partner Impact Wrestling. In November, Kushida teamed with Kevin Knight in the Super Junior Tag League, ending the tournament with 4 points, failing to advance to the finals.

In March 2023, Kushida became a trainer at the NJPW Academy, formerly the LA Dojo. On April 27, 2023, Kushida and Knight, now teaming under the name of "Intergalactic Jet Setters", defeated Catch 2/2 (TJP and Francesco Akira) to win the IWGP Junior Heavyweight Tag Team Championships. In May, Kushida was announced to be competing in the A Block of the Best of the Super Juniors 30. Kushida finished with a total of 4 points, failing to advance to the semi-finals. On June 4 at Dominion 6.4 in Osaka-jo Hall, Intergalactic Jet Setters lost the IWGP Junior Heavyweight Tag Team Championships back to Catch 2/2 in a rematch.

In May 2024, Kushida competed in the Best of the Super Juniors tournament, defeating Hiromu Takahashi on May 11 and Francesco Akira on May 16, among other opponents. On October 14 at King of Pro-Wrestling, Kushida and Kevin Knight defeated Bullet Club War Dogs (Clark Connors and Drilla Moloney) to win the IWGP Junior Heavyweight Tag Team Championship, beginning their second reign as champions. On January 4, 2025, at Wrestle Kingdom 19, Kushida Knight lost the titles to Ichiban Sweet Boys (Kosei Fujita and Robbie Eagles) in a four-way ladder match.

On January 11 at Battle in the Valley, KUSHIDA challenged Konosuke Takeshita for the NEVER Openweight Championship but was unsuccessful. In May 2025, Kushida competed in the Best of the Super Juniors tournament. He defeated Ninja Mack, Kosei Fujita and Dragon Dia during the tournament, but did not advance to the final. In October and November 2025, KUSHIDA teamed with Yuki Yoshioka in the Super Junior Tag League. The pair competed against teams including El Desperado and Kuukai, but did not advance to the final.

In October 2026, Kushida teamed with Nick Wayne to form "Time Splliters V2" (also shortened to "TV2") in the 2026 Super Junior Tag League as part of Block A. The duo finished the tournament with finished with 4 points (2–3) and failed to qualify for the finals.

=== Impact Wrestling / Total Nonstop Action Wrestling (2022–2024) ===
Kushida made his Impact Wrestling debut on July 21, 2022, saving Chris Sabin and his former Time Splitters teammate Alex Shelley from an attack by Deaner and Joe Doering. Kushida then formed a stable with Sabin and Shelley known as Time Machine.

On April 16, 2023, at Rebellion, Kushida was defeated by Steve Maclin in a match for the vacant Impact World Championship. On June 29, 2023 it was announced that on July 15, 2023 at Impact Slammiversary of year 2023 that Kushida will be facing Mike Bailey, Jonathan Gresham, Kevin Knight and Alan Angels in a 5-way Ultimate X match to determine the #1 contender to the Impact X Division Championship. Later on Jake Something was added on to the match making it a 6-way. During this match Kushida was successful. On December 13, it was announced by the newly-renamed TNA Wrestling that Kushida had signed with the promotion.

At No Surrender, Intergalactic Jet Setters (Kushida and Kevin Knight) lost to The System (Eddie Edwards and Brian Myers). At Sacrifice, Kushida, Chris Sabin and Alex Shelley lost to The Grizzled Young Vets (Zack Gibson and James Drake) and Mustafa Ali. At Under Siege, Kushida lost to Jonathan Gresham. On the Slammiversary preshow, Kushida defeated Rich Swann. At Emergence, Kushida lost to Frankie Kazarian. At Victory Road. Kushida defeated Leon Slater. At Turning Point, Kushida, Zachary Wentz, and Matt Riddle lost to The Hardys (Matt Hardy and Jeff Hardy) and Ace Austin. On the December 5 Impact!, Kushida won a five-way match against Ace Austin, Trent Seven, Leon Slater and JDC to earn a TNA X Division Championship match. At Final Resolution, Kushida failed to win the title against Moose. He left TNA in December 2024.

=== All Elite Wrestling (2023) ===
On the January 18, 2023 episode of Dynamite, Kushida made his All Elite Wrestling (AEW) debut, where he unsuccessfully challenged for the AEW TNT Championship against Darby Allin.

=== Major League Wrestling (2023, 2025–present) ===
Kushhida made his Major League Wrestling (MLW) debut on September 3, 2023, at Fury Road, defeating Tony Deppen.

Kushida returned to MLW on February 8, 2025, at SuperFight VI, defeating Neon during the event's television tapings. On April 5, Kushida competed in the 40-man Battle RIOT VII, which was won by Matt Riddle to retain the MLW World Heavyweight Championship. On January 29, 2026, at Battle RIOT VIII, Kushida defeated Templario to win the MLW World Middleweight Championship, his first championship in MLW. Following the match, Ikuro Kwon offered KUSHIDA a shirt representing Contra Unit, which Kushida accepted, turning heel and joining the faction. On May 1, Kushida lost the World Middleweight Championship to Templario at a joint MLW and Consejo Mundial de Lucha Libre (CMLL) event at Arena México in Mexico City, ending his reign at 92 days.

=== Return to CMLL (2025–present) ===
On April 25, 2025, Kushida returned to CMLL, representing Major League Wrestling and defeated Ultimo Guerrero at the 69th anniversary eventr of the Arena México. During his tour, Kushida teamed with Okumura and Yutani as Los Demonios Samurais, defeating Los Dragones (Dragon Rojo Jr., Dragon de Fuego and Dragon Legendario) on April 26 at Arena Coliseo. On May 2, Kushida unsuccessfully faced Místico at a joint CMLL and MLW event at Arena México.

== Personal life ==
Kushida resided in Orlando, Florida, with his wife and daughter during his time in WWE before moving to Los Angeles, California in 2022 following his return to New Japan Pro Wrestling. In addition to speaking Japanese, Kushida is fluent in English.

Kushida is good friends with fellow wrestler Alex Shelley, his former tag team partner.

== Championships and accomplishments ==
=== Mixed martial arts ===
- ZST
  - ZST Genesis Lightweight Tournament (2004)

=== Professional wrestling ===
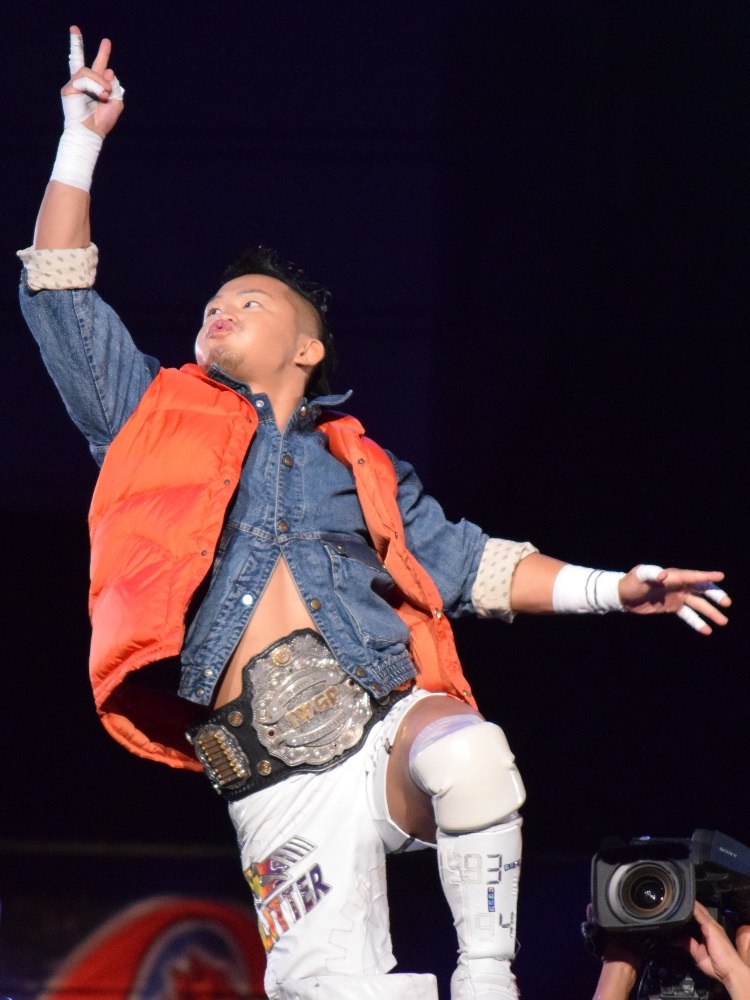
Kushida is a six-time IWGP Junior Heavyweight Champion

- All Japan Pro Wrestling
  - AJPW U-30 Tag Team Tournament (2008) – with T28
- Consejo Mundial de Lucha Libre
  - Cuadrangular de Parejas (2016) – with Marco Corleone
- Filipino Pro Wrestling
  - FPW Championship (1 time)
- Major League Wrestling
  - MLW World Middleweight Championship (1 time)
- New Japan Pro-Wrestling
  - IWGP Junior Heavyweight Championship (6 times)
  - IWGP Junior Heavyweight Tag Team Championship (4 times) – with Alex Shelley (2) and Kevin Knight (2)
  - IWGP Junior Heavyweight Championship Tournament (2018)
  - Best of the Super Juniors (2015, 2017)
  - Super J-Cup (2016)
  - Super Jr. Tag Tournament (2012) – with Alex Shelley
- Pro Wrestling Illustrated
  - Ranked No. 20 of the top 500 singles wrestlers in the PWI 500 in 2017
- Ring of Honor
  - ROH World Television Championship (1 time)
- What Culture Pro Wrestling
  - Pro Wrestling World Cup (2017)
  - Pro Wrestling World Cup Japanese Qualifiers (2017)
- WWE
  - NXT Cruiserweight Championship (1 time)

== Mixed martial arts record ==
Professional record breakdown
8 matches	6 wins	0 losses
By knockout	0	0
By submission	2	0
By decision	3	0
By disqualification	1	0
Draws	2	

Res.	Record	Opponent	Method	Event	Date	Round	Time	Location	Notes
Draw	6–0–2	Shinya Sato	Draw	ZST: Grand Prix 2 Final Round	January 23, 2005	3	3:00	Tokyo, Japan	
Win	6–0–1	Takahiro Uchiyama	Submission (armbar)	ZST: Battle Hazard 1	July 4, 2004	2	3:10	Tokyo, Japan	
Win	5–0–1	Takahiro Uchiyama	Decision (unanimous)	ZST: Grand Prix Final Round	January 11, 2004	1	5:00	Tokyo, Japan	
Win	4–0–1	Norimasa Isozaki	Submission (rear-naked choke)	ZST: Grand Prix Final Round	January 11, 2004	1	1:37	Tokyo, Japan	
Win	3–0–1	Tomohiko Hori	Decision (unanimous)	ZST: Grand Prix Final Round	January 11, 2004	1	5:00	Tokyo, Japan	
Win	2–0–1	Chikara Uehara	Decision (unanimous)	ZST: Grand Prix Opening Round	November 23, 2003	1	5:00	Tokyo, Japan	
Draw	1–0–1	Tomohiko Hori	Draw	ZST: The Battlefield 4	July 7, 2003	1	5:00	Tokyo, Japan	
Win	1–0	Kenji Mizuno	DQ (rope grabbing)	ZST: The Battlefield 3	June 1, 2003	1	3:13	Tokyo, Japan	
