= Jeff Cobb =

American professional wrestler (born 1982)

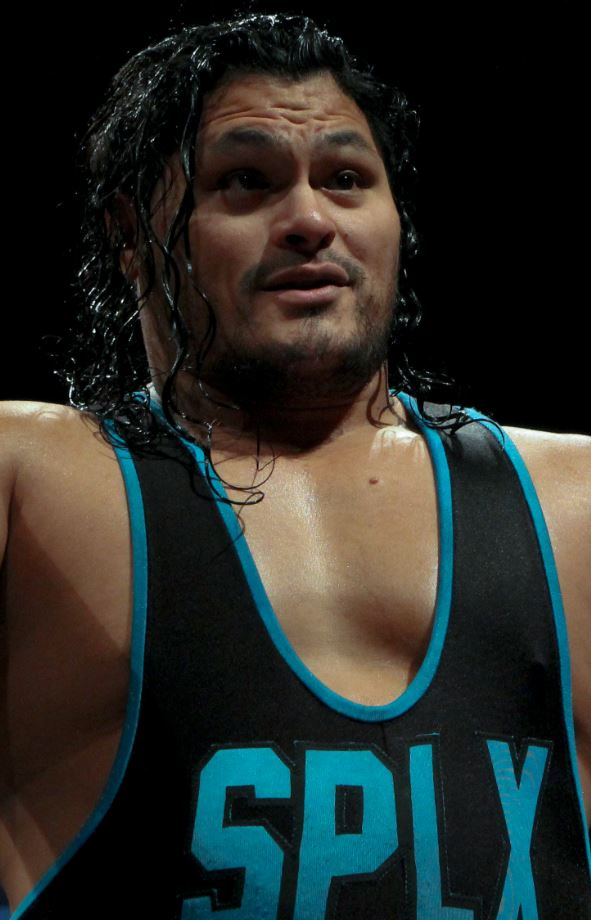
- Cobb in 2020

Personal information
- Born: Jeffrey Cobb; July 11, 1982 (age 44) Honolulu, Hawaii, U.S.

Professional wrestling career
- Ring name(s): El Jéfe Cobbo; JC Mateo; Jeff Cobb; Matanza; Matanza Cueto
- Billed height: 5 ft 10 in (178 cm)
- Billed weight: 264 lb (120 kg)
- Billed from: Honolulu, Hawaii
- Trained by: Oliver John
- Debut: June 4, 2009
- Amateur wrestling career
- Nationality: Guam
- Height: 1.78 m (5 ft 10 in)
- Weight: 84 kg (185 lb)
- Style: Freestyle
- Club: Guam Amateur Wrestling; Federation
- Coach: Neil Krantz

Jeffrey Cobb (born July 11, 1982) is an American professional wrestler and former amateur wrestler. He is signed to New Japan Pro-Wrestling (NJPW), where he is a member of Unbound Co. and one-third of the NEVER Openweight 6-Man Tag Team Champions with fellow stablemates Yuto-Ice and Oskar.

As an amateur wrestler, Cobb represented Guam at the 2004 Summer Olympics, where he became the nation's flag bearer in the opening ceremony and competed in the men's light heavyweight freestyle category. He began his professional wrestling career in 2009 on the independent circuit, performing for various promotions around the Hawaiian and West Coast independent scenes. In 2015, he began working for Lucha Underground as Matanza Cueto, the kayfabe brother of owner Dario Cueto, where he is a former one-time Lucha Underground Champion. In 2016, he began working for Pro Wrestling Guerrilla (PWG), where he became a former one-time PWG World Champion, one-time PWG World Tag Team Champion and is also the winner of the 2018 Battle of Los Angeles.

He began predominantly working for New Japan Pro-Wrestling (NJPW) in 2017 and signed with the company in 2019, where he became a member of the United Empire in 2020. He is a former one-time NEVER Openweight Champion, one-time NJPW World Television Champion, and a three-time IWGP Tag Team Champion. Through NJPW's working relationship, he also made appearances for All Elite Wrestling (AEW) and Ring of Honor (ROH) where he is a former one-time ROH Television Champion. He departed NJPW in 2025 and signed with WWE that same year as JC Mateo, becoming part of the MFTs stable upon debut until his departure in May 2026. He returned to NJPW that August as a member of Unbound Co.

== Amateur wrestling career ==
During his amateur wrestling career, Cobb trained for the Guam Amateur Wrestling Federation under his personal coach Neil Krantz. Cobb qualified for the Guamanian squad in the men's 84 kg class at the 2004 Summer Olympics in Athens by receiving a continental berth from the Oceanian Championships in Dededo. He received two straight losses due to technical superiority and no classification points in a preliminary pool match against Cuba's Yoel Romero and Germany's Davyd Bichinashvili, finishing 21st overall out of 22 wrestlers.

== Professional wrestling career ==
=== Early career (2009–2014) ===
Cobb began professional wrestling in 2009 training and working for Action Zone Wrestling in Hawaii. He was given the name "Mr. Athletic". He won the AZW Heavyweight Title a record setting three times. He made appearances for many independent promotions in Northern California such as All Pro Wrestling, Supreme Pro Wrestling, Pro Wrestling Bushido, Fighting Spirit Pro, Phoenix Pro Wrestling and PREMIER Wrestling, where he held their heavyweight championship for 427 days. In September 2014, he received a tryout at the WWE Performance Center.

=== Lucha Underground (2015–2019) ===
Cobb signed to Lucha Underground in 2015. He debuted for the promotion on March 22, 2016, under a mask and the ring name "The Monster" Matanza Cueto, the storyline brother of Dario Cueto, winning the Lucha Underground Championship in his first match. Matanza remained undefeated until April 9, 2016, when he was pinned by Rey Mysterio in an Aztec Warfare match, losing the Lucha Underground Championship in the process.

His character was killed off in the fourth season, which aired in 2018. On April 29, 2019, it was reported that Cobb was seeking legal action to be released from his Lucha Underground contract. This came after similar motions from others on the show, including King Cuerno and Joey Ryan. On May 1, it was confirmed that Cobb was released from the company.

=== Pro Wrestling Guerrilla (2016–2019) ===
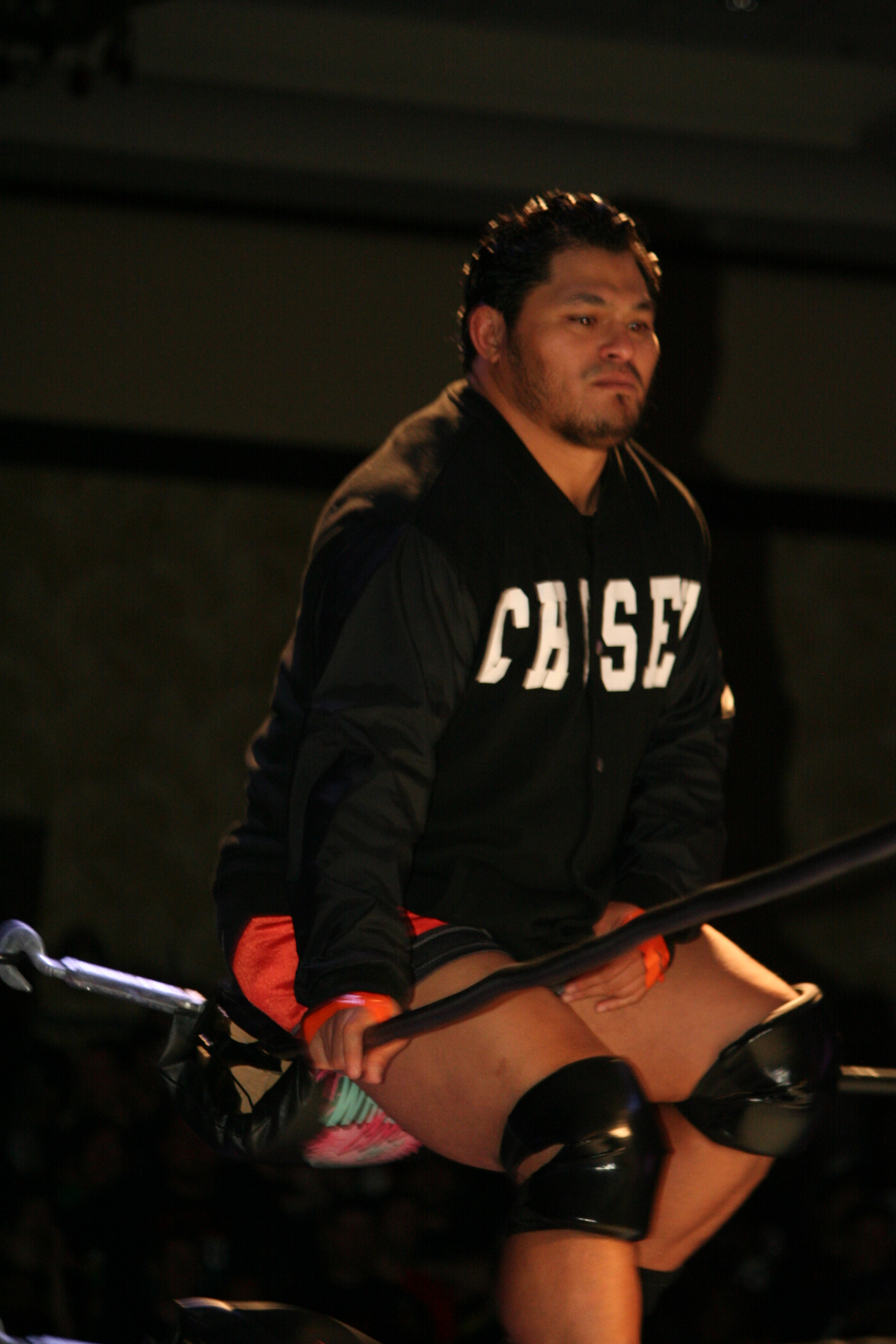
Cobb in 2017

On May 20, 2016, Cobb made his debut for Pro Wrestling Guerrilla (PWG), losing to Chris Hero. On September 2, Cobb entered the 2016 Battle of Los Angeles, from which he was eliminated in the first round by Ricochet.

At Mystery Vortex on December 16, Cobb and Matt Riddle defeated The Young Bucks. Cobb and Riddle were later known in PWG as "The Chosen Bros". On February 18, 2017, Cobb and Riddle would defeat the Unbreakable F'n Machines (Brian Cage and Michael Elgin). On March 18, 2017, the team would beat OI4K (Dave Crist and Jake Crist). On April 21, 2017, Cobb, in singles action, would defeat Keith Lee. On May 19, 2017, The Chosen Bros defeated reDRagon (Kyle O'Reilly and Bobby Fish). On October 20, The Chosen Bros defeated the Lucha Brothers (Rey Fenix and Penta el Zero M) to win the PWG World Tag Team Championship. They retained the titles until April 20, 2018, when they lost them against The Rascalz (Zachary Wentz and Dezmond Xavier). On September 15–16, 2018, he went on to win the 2018 Battle of Los Angeles, defeating Darby Allin in the first round, Rey Horus in the second round, Trevor Lee in the third round, and Shingo Takagi and Bandido in the final.

On October 19, Cobb defeated Walter at Smokey and the Bandido to win the PWG World Championship. He then successfully defended it against Trevor Lee at Hand of Doom in January 2019. He would also successfully defend his title against Jonathan Gresham and BOLA runner up Bandido during his reign. He then competed in his 4th Battle of Los Angeles but fell in the second round to David Starr. He would go on to drop the title after 421 days in a rematch with eventual tournament winner Bandido later that year.

=== Progress Wrestling (2017–2018) ===
On May 27, 2017, Cobb made his Progress Wrestling debut by defeating Nathan Cruz in the first round of the Super Strong Style 16 Tournament 2017. The following day, Cobb lost his second round match to Matt Riddle. On May 29, Cobb received his first shot at the Progress World Championship, losing to Pete Dunne.

=== New Japan Pro-Wrestling (2017–2025) ===
==== Debut and NEVER Openweight Champion (2017–2019) ====
On November 6, 2017, Cobb was announced as a participant in New Japan Pro-Wrestling's 2017 World Tag League, where he would team with Michael Elgin. Cobb and Elgin did not get along behind the scenes, with Elgin making disparaging remarks about his tag team partner in private messages that were made public while the tournament was still in progress. The two finished the tournament on December 9 with a record of four wins and three losses, failing to advance to the finals. On June 11, 2018, it was announced that Cobb would return to New Japan Pro-Wrestling for Kizuna Road shows. On June 17, it was announced that Jeff Cobb would face Hirooki Goto for his NEVER Openweight Championship. He would go on to lose the match. Cobb spent the bulk of late 2018 participating in the World Tag League tournament with partner Michael Elgin, winning eight matches, but failing to qualify for the finals. On April 6, 2019, Cobb won the NEVER Openweight Championship in a Winner takes all match against Will Ospreay at G1 Supercard. Cobb's ROH World Television Championship was also on the line. Cobb would eventually lose the NEVER Openweight Championship to Taichi in the first night of Wrestling Dontaku 2019. Cobb then competed in his first 2019 G1 Climax Tournament where he finished with 8 points thus failing to advance to the finals. On November 6, 2019, Cobb was announced to be in one of the teams in the 2019 World Tag League Tournament with tag partner Mikey Nicholls where they finished with 16 points failing to advance to the finals.

==== United Empire (2020–2025) ====
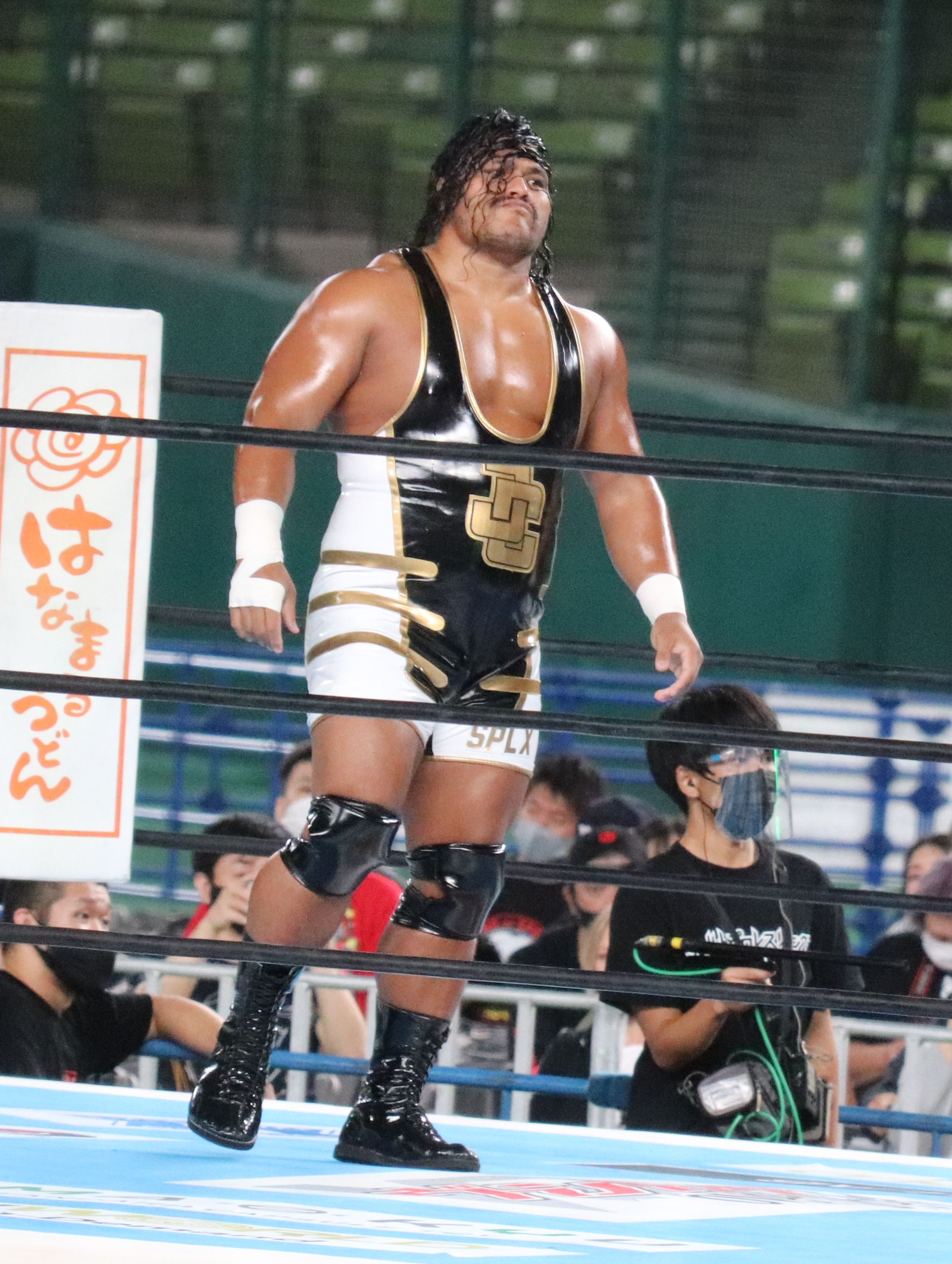
Cobb at Wrestle Grand Slam in Tokyo Dome

In August 2020, Cobb competed in the New Japan Cup USA where he defeated Tanga Loa in the first round before losing to Kenta in the semi-finals. Cobb was also announced to be competing in the 2020 G1 Climax tournament where he again finished with 8 points, failing to advance to the finals. It was also reported that Cobb had signed a contract with New Japan, officially joining the roster full time. He would join Will Ospreay's United Empire stable (then known as the Empire) at the November 15 show, teaming with Great-O-Khan in the annual World Tag League thus turning heel in the process, though finishing the tournament with 10 points, failing to advance to the finals. At Wrestle Kingdom 15 in Tokyo Dome he challenged Shingo Takagi for the NEVER Openweight Championship but lost the match.

In March, Cobb would participate in the New Japan Cup, he defeated Satoshi Kojima in the first round, but was eliminated in the second round by Evil. Over the next few months, Cobb would team with his United Empire teammates in tag team matches against Los Ingobernables de Japon. Cobb began a short feud with Kota Ibushi which culminated in a match between the two at Dominion 6.6 in Osaka-jo Hall, which Cobb lost. Cobb then began a feud with Kazuchika Okada, which started when Cobb pinned Okada in a tag match. The two would exchange losses and victories over the next few months, with Okada beating Cobb at Wrestle Grand Slam in Tokyo Dome and Cobb defeating Okada at Wrestle Grand Slam in MetLife Dome.

In September, Cobb would enter the G1 Climax 31 and would be in the B-block. During the tournament, Cobb would break records, defeating Chase Owens, Yoshi-Hashi, Hirooki Goto, Tama Tonga, Taichi, Sanada, Hiroshi Tanahashi and Evil, therefore winning his first 8 consecutive G1 matches, the most consecutive wins in the tournament's history. However, on Night 18 in the B-block final, Cobb would lose to eventual G1 winner Kazuchika Okada, failing to advance to the tournament with 16 points, as Okada had also only lost one B-block match to Tama Tonga. On January 4 at Wrestle Kingdom 16, United Empire defeated Los Ingobernables de Japon on night one, but Cobb would lose to Tetsuya Naito on night two the following day.

In March, Cobb would once again enter the New Japan Cup. He defeated Togi Makabe, Kojima and Yoshi-Hashi, but lost to Naito in the quarter final round. Cobb reshifted his focus to tag team competition with Great O-Khan who had been teaming with Aaron Henare. On April 9, O-Khan and Cobb became the IWGP Tag Team Champions for the first time in both men's careers, during the Hyper Battle series. The two lost the titles at Wrestling Dontaku, ending their reign at 22 days. They regained the titles on June 12, at Dominion 6.12 in Osaka-jo Hall. After losing the titles at Forbidden Door, Cobb was announced to be a part of the G1 Climax 32 in July at Dominion 6.12 in Osaka-jo Hall, where he would compete in the A Block. Cobb finished the tournament with 6 points, failing to advance to the semi-finals. Later that year in October, Cobb participated in a tournament to crown the inaugural NJPW World Television Champion, but was defeated by Yoshi-Hashi in the first round. The following month at Battle Autumn, Cobb and O-Khan faced FTR in a rematch for the IWGP Tag Team titles, but were defeated. On January 4 at Wrestle Kingdom 17, Cobb competed in the New Japan Rambo, but failed to last till the final 4.

In March, Cobb competed in the New Japan Cup, receiving a bye to the second round, where he was defeated by Evil. Later that month, Cobb defeated Moose at Multiverse United. In May at Wrestling Dontaku, Cobb challenged Zack Sabre Jr. for the NJPW World Television Championship, but the match ended in a time limit draw, causing Sabre Jr to retain the championship. A rematch was set up the following month at Dominion 6.4 in Osaka-jo Hall, where Sabre Jr defeated Cobb. Later in the month, Cobb competed on the buy-in of Forbidden Door, where he teamed with United Empire stablemates, Kyle Fletcher and TJP in a losing effort to Los Ingobernables de Japon members, Shingo Takagi, Bushhi and Hiromu Takahashi . The following month, Cobb competed in the annual G1 Climax tournament, where he was placed into the D Block. Cobb finished with 9 points, narrowly missing out on qualifying for a quarterfinal spot. On May 3 at Wrestling Dontaku, Cobb defeated Sabre Jr. to win the NJPW World Television Championship for the first time. On October 14 at King of Pro-Wrestling Cobb lost the World Television title to Ren Narita in a 3-way match also including Yota Tsuji. He would compete in a losing effort for the title again at Wrestle Kingdom 19 in Four-way match. On April 4 at Sakura Genesis, Cobb and Callum Newman defeated Tetsuya Naito and Hiromu Takahashi to win the IWGP Tag Team Championship.

On April 14, NJPW announced that Cobb would be leaving the promotion and the IWGP Tag Team Championship would be vacated, ending Cobb and Newman’s reign at 9 days. Cobb's final match took place five days later, where he lost to Hiroshi Tanahashi. After the match, Cobb thanked NJPW, his United Empire stablemates, and the NJPW fans, officially ending his near 8-year tenure with the promotion.

=== Ring of Honor (2018–2020, 2022) ===
On July 21, 2018, Cobb made his Ring of Honor (ROH) debut at a television taping (aired August 21) by attacking Eli Isom and FR Josie during their ROH Top Prospect Tournament first round match, causing it to end in a no contest. At Death Before Dishonor XVI on September 28, Cobb confronted Punishment Martinez following his defense of the ROH World Television Championship. At a television taping the following night, Cobb, in his first official match, defeated Martinez to win the ROH World Television Championship. Cobb then would win both of his matches during the two-day Glory By Honor XVI event in October, all three of his matches during the Global Wars 2018 tour in November, and defeated Adam Page at Final Battle on December 14 to round out the year.

2019 began with Cobb winning a four-way match at Honor Reigns Supreme, and then winning all three of his matches (two of them being tag team matches) during the Road to G1 Supercard tour. At ROH/NJPW War of the Worlds Night 2, Cobb would lose the World Television Championship to Shane Taylor. After Cobb's contract expired on January 1, 2020, it was reported that Cobb would still wrestle for ROH, albeit on a per-show basis. In October 2020, his profile was moved to the alumni section.

On December 10, 2022 at Final Battle, Cobb returned to ROH, defeating Máscara Dorada on the pre-show.

=== All Elite Wrestling (2020, 2022–2024) ===
Cobb made his debut for All Elite Wrestling (AEW) on the February 12, 2020 episode of Dynamite, attacking Jon Moxley alongside The Inner Circle. He wrestled his AEW debut match on the following week's episode of Dynamite, losing to Moxley.

After signing with NJPW, Cobb continued to make several appearances for AEW from 2022 to 2024 through a working relationship. Cobb and his tag team partner Great-O-Khan would notably lose their IWGP Tag Team Championships to the ROH World Tag Team Champions FTR at Forbidden Door in 2022 in a three-way tag team Winner Takes All match, also involving Roppongi Vice. On the March 29, 2023 episode of Dynamite, Cobb unsuccessfully challenged Kenny Omega for the IWGP United States Heavyweight Championship. Cobb's last appearance for AEW took place on June 30, 2024 at Forbidden Door, where he teamed with The Learning Tree (Chris Jericho and Big Bill) in a losing effort against Samoa Joe, Hook, and Katsuyori Shibata.

=== Consejo Mundial de Lucha Libre (2021) ===
On November 12, 2021, it was announced that Cobb would debut for Consejo Mundial de Lucha Libre (CMLL) seven days later at Arena México, where he and TJP defeated Atlantis Jr. and Volador Jr. They also defeated El Terrible and Euforia on November 20 and Terrible and Hechicero the next night.

=== WWE (2025–2026) ===
On May 10, 2025, Cobb made his WWE debut at Backlash, where he assisted Jacob Fatu in retaining his WWE United States Championship, establishing himself as a heel and joining The Bloodline. The following week on SmackDown, he was given the new ring name, JC Mateo, and won his debut match against LA Knight. On the July 4 episode of SmackDown, the Bloodline was rebranded to the "MFT". On the March 20, 2026 episode of SmackDown, Mateo defended the WWE Tag Team Championship with stablemate Tama Tonga on behalf of stable leader Solo Sikoa, but the duo lost the titles to Damian Priest and R-Truth. They failed to regain the titles on the April 24 episode of SmackDown, in what was Mateo's final match in WWE. On May 2, Mateo was released from WWE, ending his tenure with the company at less than a year.

=== Return to NJPW (2026–present) ===
Cobb made his return to NJPW on August 16, 2026 on the final night of the G1 Climax, where he was introduced by Gedo as the newest member of Unbound Co. and confronted his former United Empire stabelmate Callum Newman, establishing himself as a face. On September 27 at Destruction in Kobe, Cobb was defeated by Newman. On October 12 at King of Pro-Wrestling, Cobb teamed with stablemates Knock Out Brothers (Yuto-Ice and Oskar) to defeat the United Empire's Will Ospreay, Henare and Great-O-Khan to win the NEVER Openweight Six-Man Tag Team Championship.

== Professional wrestling style and persona ==
Cobb's finishers are a spinning scoop powerslam variation called "The Tour of the Islands" and a Gachimuchi-Sault.

During his work in Lucha Underground, Cobb performed as "The Monster" Matanza Cueto, wearing a mask and a boilersuit. He described his character like Jason Voorhees or Michael Myers. During this time, his finisher was called "Wrath of the Gods".

== Personal life ==
Cobb is of Filipino descent on his mother's side. He was born in Hawaii to Filipino immigrants. Cobb's parents later moved to Guam when he was 11, and he studied at John F. Kennedy High School in Tumon.

== Championships and accomplishments ==
- AAW Professional Wrestling
  - AAW Tag Team Championship (1 time) – with David Starr and Eddie Kingston
- Action Zone Wrestling
  - AZW Heavyweight Championship (3 times)
- All Pro Wrestling
  - APW Universal Heavyweight Championship (1 time)
  - Young Lions Cup (2012)
- Big Time Wrestling
  - BTW Tag Team Championships (1 time) – with Kimo
- Cape Championship Wrestling
  - CCW Tag Team Championship (1 time) – with Blaster
- Filipino Pro Wrestling
  - FPW Championship (1 time)
- Fighting Spirit Pro
  - FSP Championship (1 time)
- Lucha Underground
  - Lucha Underground Championship (1 time)
  - Aztec Warfare II
- New Japan Pro-Wrestling
  - NEVER Openweight Championship (1 time)
  - NJPW World Television Championship (1 time)
  - IWGP Tag Team Championship (3 times) – with Great-O-Khan (2) and Callum Newman (1)
  - NEVER Openweight 6-Man Tag Team Championship (1 time, current) – with Yuto-Ice and Oskar
- Premier Wrestling
  - Premier Heavyweight Championship (2 time)
- Pro Wrestling Guerrilla
  - PWG World Championship (1 time)
  - PWG World Tag Team Championship (1 time) – with Matt Riddle
  - Battle of Los Angeles (2018)
- Pro Wrestling Illustrated
  - Ranked No. 23 of the top 500 singles wrestlers in the PWI 500 in 2019
- Ring of Honor
  - Move of the Year (2018) for Tour of the Islands
  - ROH World Television Championship (1 time)
- Ring Warriors
  - Ring Warriors Grand Championship (1 time)
  - Ring Warriors Grand Title Tournament (2018)
- Tokyo Sports
  - Best Tag Team Award (2022) – with Great-O-Khan
- Wrestling For Charity
  - Mission City Cup (2013)

== Freestyle record ==
Olympic Games Matches
Res.	Record	Opponent	Score	Date	Event	Location
Loss	0–2	(Cuba) Yoel Romero	Tech. Fall (0–10)	August 26, 2004	2004 Summer Olympics	Athens, Greece
Loss	0–1	(Germany) Davyd Bichinashvili	Tech. Fall (0–10)	August 26, 2004	2004 Summer Olympics	Athens, Greece
