= List of All Pro Wrestling tournaments =

The following is a list of all the tournaments that have been held by All Pro Wrestling.

== King of the Indies Tournament ==
=== 2000 ===
The first King of the Indies tournament was held on December 30, 2000, in Galt, CA.

Quarterfinals
1	Christopher Daniels
8	Boyce LeGrande
4	Scoot Andrews
5	Vinny Massaro
2	Robert Thompson
7	Michael Modest
3	Vic Capri
6	Donovan Morgan

Semifinals
Christopher Daniels
Scoot Andrews
Michael Modest
Donovan Morgan

Finals
Christopher Daniels
Donovan Morgan

=== 2001 ===
Over the weekend of October 26–27, in Vallejo, CA, APW held the 2nd "King of the Indies" tournament, which showcased premiere independent wrestlers from across the United States. A.J. Styles, Samoa Joe, Frankie Kazarian, Doug Williams, and Spanky were among the participants in the 16-man event. "American Dragon" Bryan Danielson would ultimately be crowned "King of the Indies" after defeating Low Ki in the tournament final.

First Round
Donovan Morgan
Scoot Andrews
Bison Smith
Tony Jones
Douglas Williams
Adam Pearce
Bryan Danielson
Spanky
Christopher Daniels
Super Dragon
AJ Styles
Jardi Frantz
Low Ki
Vinny Massaro
Kazarian
Samoa Joe

Quarterfinals
Donovan Morgan
Bison Smith
Douglas Williams
Bryan Danielson
Christopher Daniels
AJ Styles
Low Ki
Samoa Joe

Semifinals
Donovan Morgan
Bryan Danielson
Christopher Daniels
Low Ki

Final
Bryan Danielson
Low Ki

=== 2015 ===
Over the weekend of March 27–28, in San Jose, CA, APW held the 3rd "King of the Indies" tournament in collaboration with Pro Wrestling Revolution.

First Round
B-Boy
Brian Cage
Jeff Cobb
Rik Luxury
Rey Horus
Lil' Cholo
Jody Kristofferson
Willie Mack
Jeckles
Luster the Legend
Adam Thornstowe
Shaun Ricker
Vinny Massaro
El Mariachi
Dylan Drake
Timothy Thatcher

Quarterfinals
Brian Cage
Jeff Cobb
Rey Horus
Willie Mack
Luster the Legend
Adam Thornstowe
Timothy Thatcher
Vinnie Massarro

Semifinals
Jeff Cobb
Willie Mack
Adam Thornstowe
Timothy Thatcher

Final
Willie Mack
Adam Thornstowe

=== 2018 ===
On July 6, in Daly City, CA, APW held the 4th "King of the Indies" tournament in collaboration with Pro Wrestling Revolution.

First Round
Jeff Cobb
Jacob Fatu
Flip Gordon
Titan
Brody King
Timothy Thatcher
Ryusuke Taguchi
Dragon Lee

Semifinals
Jacob Fatu
Flip Gordon
Dragon Lee
Brody King

Finals
Flip Gordon
Dragon Lee

=== 2019 ===
On July 5, in Daly City, CA, APW held the 4th "King of the Indies" tournament in collaboration with Pro Wrestling Revolution.

First Round
J. R. Kratos
Timothy Thatcher
Dragon Lee
Laredo Kid
Jungle Boy
Jake Atlas
Jonathan Gresham
T. J. Perkins

Semifinals
J. R. Kratos
Jake Atlas
Dragon Lee
Jonathan Gresham

Finals
Jake Atlas
Dragon Lee

- 2000 Winner: Christopher Daniels (12/30/00)
- 2001 Winner: Bryan Danielson (10/27/01)
- 2015 Winner: Adam Thornstowe (3/28/2015)
- 2018 Winner: Dragon Lee (7/7/2018)
- 2019 Winner: Dragon Lee (7/6/2019)

== APW Young Lions Cup Tournament ==
=== 2008 ===
December 6, 2008 – "Out of Control" Matt Carlos wins the inaugural cup in a 4-Way Elimination Match involving himself, Dan Danielson, Junior Morales, and CORVUS.

=== 2009 ===
April 18, 2009 – This was the first Young Lion's Cup to be contested in an 8-person single elimination tournament.

Quarterfinals
1	Junior Morales
8	Elliot Fox
4	Dan Danielson
5	Johnny Plinko
2	Steve Stamp
7	Christina Von Eerie
3	Matt Carlos
6	Dave Dutra

Semifinals
Elliot Fox
Dan Danielson
Steve Stamp
Dave Dutra

Finals
Dan Danielson
Dave Dutra

=== 2010 ===
April 10, 2010 – The winner of this year's tournament would not only win the Young Lion's Cup, but would also become #1 contender for the APW Worldwide Internet Championship.

Quarterfinals
1	Matt Carlos	Pin
8	Junior Morales	6:59
4	Jody Kristofferson	Pin
5	Brandon P. Net	5:00
2	Dan Danielson	Pin
7	Steve Stamp	5:14
3	Corvus	Pin
6	Tyson Thompson	6:20

Semifinals
Matt Carlos	Pin
Jody Kristofferson	9:36
Dan Danielson	Pin
Corvus	8:46

Finals
Jody Kristofferson	Pin
Corvus	7:41

=== 2011 ===
April 1, 2011

Quarterfinals
1	CORVUS	Pin
8	Mikey Jay	5:20
4	Perry Von Vicious	Submit
5	Daniel Torch	2:33
2	Will Rood	Pin
7	Victor Sterling	5:06
3	Brandon P. Net	Pin
6	Levi Shapiro	2:36

Semifinals
Mikey Jay	---
Perry Von Vicious	BYE^{1}
Will Rood	Pin
Brandon P. Net	6:15

Finals
Perry Von Vicious	Pin
Brandon P. Net	7:57

1. Perry Von Vicious was awarded a bye into the Finals after APW Commissioner J.J. Perez deemed Mikey Jay unfit to compete after a post-match attack by CORVUS in the 1st round.

=== 2012 ===
May 5, 2012

-The 2012 Young Lions Cup Tournament is the first tournament to include 16 Competitors. The competitors were broken into 8 teams by the APW Championship Committee. Those teams would wrestle each other in single elimination format; the winning team would go on to face one another in the Quarterfinals of the Tournament.

-Results of Round One: In Round One of the 2012 APW Young Lions Cup Tournament, the team of Damien Grundy with Matthew Theall & J. R. Kratos eliminated the team of Brian Tannen & Joe DeSoul. Tenchismo & SLEDGE with CORVUS & DARKNESS were eliminated by the team of Mikey Jay & Daniel Torch. The team of Sasha Darevko & Jeff Cobb eliminated the team of Ray Rosas & Chris Cali. The team of Shoop Shellhammer and Levi Shapiro with Matthew Theall were eliminated by the team of Darren Dean & Kay Jutler. All winning teams would advance to the Quarterfinals of the Tournament.

Quarterfinals
1	Damien Grundy
8	J. R. Kratos
4	Sasha Darevko
5	Jeff Cobb
2	Mikey Jay
7	Daniel Torch
3	Darren Dean
6	Kay Jutler

Semifinals
8	J. R. Kratos
5	Jeff Cobb
3	Mikey Jay
7	Kay Jutler

Finals
5	Jeff Cobb
7	Kay Jutler

=== 2013 ===
November 2, 2013

Quarterfinals
1	Marcus Lewis	DQ
8	Truex
4	Buddy Royal	Pin
5	Dominic Simon
2	Ryan McQueen	Pin
7	John Redito
3	T-Lo	Pin
6	Sione Finau

Semifinals
Marcus Lewis	Pin
Dominic Simon
Ryan McQueen	Pin
Sione Finau

Finals
Marcus Lewis	Pin
Sione Finau

=== 2014 ===
October 25, 2014

The Young Lions Cup returned to its original format and was held at Halloween Hell 17. "Flyin" Ryan McQueen won the cup in a 4-Way Elimination Match involving himself, Idris Jackson, Truex and Jinxx. While being presented the cup McQueen called out and attacked his trainer former APW Universal Heavyweight Champion Adam Thornstowe.

== Pick the Winner Battle Royal ==
- 2009 Winner: "The Latin Dragon" Junior Morales (1/3/09)
- 2010 Winner: "Out of Control" Matt Carlos (1/16/10)
- 2011 Winner: Corvus (1/8/11)
- 2012 Winner: "Big Country" Jody Kristofferson (1/14/12)
- 2013 Winner: "The Rock Legend Scum" Adam Thornstowe (1/5/13)

== Gauntlet to the Gold ==
- 2008 Winner: Dylan Drake (10/4/08)
- 2009 Winner: Malachi (9/26/09)

== Super Summer Series ==
- 2010 Winner: "The Boss" Derek Sanders (6/12/10)

Bracket "B" winner, Derek Sanders, defeated Bracket "A" winner, Dylan Drake in the finals to win the Super Summer Series and become #1 contender for the APW Universal Heavyweight Championship.

Decision	Point Value
Pinfall	20 pts
Submission	20 pts
Count Out	15 pts
Disqualification	10 pts
Time Limit Draw (TLD)	5 pts

Bracket A Results
Wrestler	Score
Dylan Drake	45
Mr. Wrestling #4	25
Rik Luxury	20
Dave Dutra	10

Results	Dave Dutra	Dylan Drake	Rik Luxury	Mr. Wrestling #4
Dave Dutra	X	TLD	Luxury (pin)	TLD
Dylan Drake	TLD	X	Drake (submit)	Drake (submit)
Rik Luxury	Luxury (pin)	Drake (submit)	X	Mr. Wrestling #4 (pin)
Mr. Wrestling #4	TLD	Drake (submit)	Mr. Wrestling #4 (pin)	X

Bracket B Results
Wrestler	Score
Derek Sanders	40
Jody Kristofferson	35
Vinny Massaro	20
Timothy Thatcher	20

Results	Derek Sanders	Timothy Thatcher	Vinny Massaro	Jody Kristofferson
Derek Sanders	X	Sanders (pin)	Sanders (pin)	Kristofferson (pin)
Timothy Thatcher	Sanders (pin)	X	Massaro (pin)	Thatcher (submit)
Vinny Massaro	Sanders (pin)	Massaro (pin)	X	Kristofferson (c/o)
Jody Kristofferson	Kristofferson (pin)	Thatcher (submit)	Kristofferson (c/o)	X

== See also ==
- Professional wrestling tournament
