= Ring Warriors =

- Genre: Professional wrestling
- Created by: Hiro Matsuda; Howard T. Brody
- Starring: Ring Warriors Roster
- Country of origin: United States
- No. of seasons: 1
- No. of episodes: 13

Production
- Executive producers: Larry Brannon; Howard Brody; Howard Lipkint
- Production location: Sam's Town Hotel and Gambling Hall, Las Vegas
- Camera setup: Multicamera setup
- Running time: 60 minutes

Original release
- Network: WGN America; Amazon Prime Video
- Release: September 15 – December 22, 2018

Ring Warriors was an American professional wrestling promotion based in Las Vegas, Nevada. Ring Warriors was a member promotion of the National Wrestling Alliance from September 2011 to 2012. They returned with a television series, which premiered on WGN America on September 15, 2018. Their latest heavyweight champion was Killer Kross.

== History ==
In the early 1990s, Florida-based promoter Howard Brody partnered with Hiro Matsuda for World Superstars of Wrestling, Inc. and together they created an Americanized version of New Japan Pro-Wrestling's World Pro Wrestling Japanese TV show for international TV called Ring Warriors. The show appeared on Eurosport, ESPN Asia, South African Broadcasting Corporation and various other networks around the world. Initially the show was hosted by Craig DeGeorge and Sir Oliver Humperdink and after the first 26 episodes, DeGeorge was replaced by Gordon Solie, who was retiring from WCW. While the goal of Ring Warriors was to eventually create a U.S.-based promotion with the same philosophy and style as what was presented on TV, Matsuda died before that goal was realized.

In an attempt to get into the U.S. market, in 1997 World Superstars of Wrestling, Inc. partnered with the now defunct VDO and Webstar (ISP), Scott Crompton and George Zhen, broadcasting one of the first video based websites. Shot on location in Tampa Bay, Florida, Matsuda and Brody produced six one hour episodes with hosts Gordon Solie and Bruno Sammartino. Sir Oliver Humperdink did an interview segment with various wrestling personalities such as Dan "The Beast" Severn, Danny Spivey and others. With the Internet in such an infancy, technology and bandwidth could not support the endeavor so the broadcast only lasted the six episodes. Unofficially, Ring Warriors was the first television show to be broadcast on the Internet.

Brody, along with partners Larry Brannon (a.k.a. Vito DeNucci) and Paul Jones (not the wrestling manager), revived the "Ring Warriors" name for a new promotion in 2011. This incarnation was founded as a member of the National Wrestling Alliance.

In May 2013, Ring Warriors announced a restructuring of its organization. Paul Jones, who had been chief executive officer of Ring Warriors, LLC since it was first established in September 2011, was moved to business development adviser for the company and consultant on the Ring Warriors executive board. In addition to his new duties at Ring Warriors, Jones was the Battling Bombshells CEO and President. Also, the managing partners Larry Brannon and Howard T. Brody assumed the roles of COO and CEO respectively and the company also announced it has secured Angel Financing from a private funding group that has offices in South Florida and Las Vegas. The private funding enabled Ring Warriors to begin its long-awaited foray into television production and the company planned its first set of tapings in South Florida in July 2013. On March 20, 2014, Ring Warriors announced an international TV distribution deal with Fighting Spirit. In April 2015, Ring Warriors held a 6-hour TV taping at the WPBT studios. The company planned to broadcast the show in India, Singapore and Thailand. On August 15, 2015, Ring Warriors announced a TV Taping deal at Tampa Letter Carriers Hall in Tampa, Florida. However, the promotion closed in 2016.

On June 9, 2018, Ring Warriors announced they would return in August. On July 23, 2018, Ring Warriors announced on Facebook a national television partnership with WGN America. Ring Warriors would debut on the network starting September 15, 2018. In December 2018, it was announced that episodes of Ring Warriors would begin streaming on Amazon Prime Video, starting with the show's "Winter Finale" on December 22, 2018.

Ring Warriors ceased operations after the season finale on December 22, 2018.

== Champions ==
Championship	Current champion(s)	Date won
Grand Championship	Vacant	
Global Tag Team Championship	Vacant	
Battling Bombshells Championship	Vacant	

=== Grand Championship ===
#	Wrestlers	Reign	Date	Days held	Location	Event	Notes
1	Bruce Santee	1	March 29, 2012		Fort Lauderdale, Florida	NWA Ring Warriors Battle Of The Belts	Santee defeated The Giant Titan to become the inaugural champion
	Deactivated		2016				Promotion ceased operations
2	Jeff Cobb	1	October 10, 2018		Las Vegas, Nevada	Ring Warriors on WGN	Defeated Eli Drake in a tournament final to win the vacant title. Aired on October 27, 2018
3	Killer Kross	1	October 10, 2018		Las Vegas, Nevada	Ring Warriors on WGN	
	Deactivated		2018				Promotion ceased operations

=== Global Tag Team Championship ===
#	Wrestlers	Reign	Date	Days held	Location	Event	Notes
1	Wes Brisco & Cassidy Riley	1	September 8, 2012	168	Hollywood, Florida	NWA Ring Warriors September Storm	Brisco and Riley defeated The Headbangers (Mosh & Thrasher) to become the inaugural champion
2	Billy Fives & Scoot Andrews	1	February 23, 2013	903	Pembroke Pines, Florida	Ring Warriors February Fury	
3	Eddie Rios and Jay Cruz	1	August 15, 2015	??	Tampa, Florida	Live event	Rios and Cruz defeated Andrews and Simon Sez
	Deactivated		2016				Promotion ceased operations

=== Bahamian Championship ===
#	Wrestlers	Reign	Date	Days held	Location	Event	Notes
1	Chance Prophet	1	May 30, 2012	494	Nassau, Bahamas	NWA Ring Warriors Battle In The Bahamas: Invasion Of The Ring Warriors	Prophet defeated The Giant Titan to become the inaugural champion.
2	Alex Chamberlain	1	October 6, 2013	416	Fort Lauderdale, Florida	Ring Warriors TV Episode 5	
	Deactivated		November 26, 2014				

=== Battling Bombshells Championship ===
#	Wrestlers	Reign	Date	Days held	Location	Event	Notes
1	La Rosa Negra	1	July 14, 2012	56	Hollywood, Florida	NWA Ring Warriors Hollywood Heat Wave	Negra defeated Sienna DuVall and Su Yung to become the inaugural champion
2	Sienna DuVall	1	September 8, 2012	21	Hollywood, Florida	NWA Ring Warriors September Storm	
3	La Rosa Negra	2	September 29, 2012	910	Nassau, Bahamas	NWA Ring Warriors Battle In The Bahamas 2: Return Of The Ring Warriors	
4	Santana Garrett	1	March 28, 2015	??	Lake Worth	Live event	Garrett's NWA Women's Championship was also on the line
	Deactivated		2016				Promotion ceased operations

== See also ==
- List of National Wrestling Alliance territories
- List of independent wrestling promotions in the United States
