= WWC Women's Championship =

Professional wrestling women's championship

WWC World Womens Championship

Details
- Promotion: World Wrestling Council
- Date established: August 28, 1985
- Current champion: Sai Pérez
Statistics
- First champion: Wendi Richter
- Most reigns: Monster Ripper (8 reigns)
- Longest reign: La Tigresa (1775 days)
- Shortest reign: Monster Ripper (1 day)

The WWC Women's Championship was the top title for women's professional wrestling in the Puerto Rican professional wrestling promotion World Wrestling Council (WWC). The championship was established on 1985. Though the championship was abandoned on 1999, it was revived on 2006 before being retired again in 2011.

== Title history ==
Key
No.	Overall reign number
Reign	Reign number for the specific champion
Days	Number of days held
N/A	Unknown information

No.	Champion	Championship change			Reign statistics		Notes	Ref.
No.	Champion	Date	Event	Location	Reign	Days	Notes	Ref.
1	Wendi Richter	September 5, 1985	House Show	Bayamón, Puerto Rico	1	337		
2	Misty Blue Simmes	August 8, 1986	House Show	Peñuelas, Puerto Rico	1	208		
3	Monster Ripper	March 4, 1987	House Show	Bayamón, Puerto Rico	1	1		
4	Wendi Richter	March 5, 1987	House Show	Santa Isabel, Puerto Rico	2	219		
5	Candi Devine	October 10, 1987	House Show	Las Marías, Puerto Rico	1	28		
6	Monster Ripper	November 7, 1987	House Show	Bayamón, Puerto Rico	2	275		
7	Monster Ripper	September 7, 1988	House Show	Bayamón, Puerto Rico	3	51		
8	Wendi Richter	December 9, 1988	House Show	Aguada, Puerto Rico	3	124		
9	Monster Ripper	April 12, 1989	House Show	Mayagüez, Puerto Rico	4	81		
10	Candi Devine	July 2, 1989	House Show	Caguas, Puerto Rico	2	156		
11	Wendi Richter	December 5, 1989	House Show	Bayamón, Puerto Rico	4	87		
12	Candi Devine	March 2, 1990	House Show	Maunabo, Puerto Rico	3	190		
13	Jacqueline Moore	September 8, 1990	House Show	Maricao, Puerto Rico	1	32		
14	Monster Ripper	October 10, 1990	House Show	Mayagüez, Puerto Rico	5	92		
—	Vacated	January 10, 1991	House Show	Bayamón, Puerto Rico	—	—	The championship was held up after the match between Monster Ripper and Jacqueline.	
15	Monster Ripper	January 28, 1991	House Show	Bayamón, Puerto Rico	6	321		
16	Sasha	October 23, 1991	House Show	Bayamón, Puerto Rico	1	137		
17	Monster Ripper	March 9, 1991	House Show	Carolina, Puerto Rico	7	63		
18	Candi Devine	May 11, 1991	House Show	Guaynabo, Puerto Rico	4	121		
19	Monster Ripper	September 7, 1991	House Show	Bayamón, Puerto Rico	8	28		
20	Sasha	October 5, 1991	House Show	Carolina, Puerto Rico	2	204		
21	La Tigresa	April 26, 1992	House Show	Carolina, Puerto Rico	1	48		
—	Vacated	June 13, 1992	—	Carolina, Puerto Rico	—	—	The championship was held up after a match between La Tigresa and Sasha ended as a draw.	
22	La Tigresa	July 19, 1992	House Show	Caguas, Puerto Rico	2	21	Tigresa was awarded the championship by forfeit after Sasha no-showed for their rematch.	
23	Amarilis	August 9, 1992	House Show	Ponce, Puerto Rico	1	30		
—	Vacated	September 7, 1992	House Show	Bayamón, Puerto Rico	—	—	The championship was vacated after Amarilis left the promotion.	
24	Sasha	November 22, 1992	House Show	Caguas, Puerto Rico	3	146	Sasha defeat La Tigresa to win the vacant championship in a Scaffold match.	
25	La Tigresa	April 17, 1993	House Show	Bayamón, Puerto Rico	3	1,775	Awarded the title by forfeit after Sasha no-showed for their rematch.	
—	Vacated	February 25, 1998	House Show	San Germán, Puerto Rico	—	—	The championship was vacated after La Tigresa was arrested for drug charges.	
—	Deactivated	January 2, 1999	House Show	Carolina, Puerto Rico	—	—		
26	Génesis	March 25, 2006	House Show	Carolina, Puerto Rico	1	42	Génesis won a battle royal to win the vacant championship.	
—	Vacated	May 5, 2006	House Show	Maunabo, Puerto Rico	—	—		
27	Lady Demonique	May 6, 2006	House Show	Caguas, Puerto Rico	1	49	Demonique defeat Black Rose to win the vacant championship.	
28	Black Rose	June 24, 2006	House Show	Bayamón, Puerto Rico	1	77	Stacey Colón served as the special guest referee.	
29	Lady Demonique	September 9, 2006	House Show	Ponce, Puerto Rico	2	21		
30	Génesis	September 30, 2006	House Show	Bayamón, Puerto Rico	2	28		
31	Lady Demonique	October 28, 2006	House Show	Bayamón, Puerto Rico	3	26		
32	Black Rose	November 23, 2006	House Show	Caguas, Puerto Rico	2	10		
—	Vacated	December 3, 2006	—	Bayamón, Puerto Rico	—	—	The championship was vacated after Black Rose jumped to IWA.	
33	Génesis	January 6, 2007	House Show	Bayamón, Puerto Rico	3	294		
34	Amazona	October 27, 2007	House Show	Bayamón, Puerto Rico	1	49		
35	Génesis	December 15, 2007	House Show	Caguas, Puerto Rico	4	140		
36	Killer Kat	May 3, 2008	House Show	Ponce, Puerto Rico	1	266		
37	Sweet Nancy	January 24, 2009	House Show	Bayamón, Puerto Rico	1	77		
38	Killer Kat	March 21, 2009	House Show	Bayamón, Puerto Rico	2	21		
39	Sara Jay-Evans	April 11, 2009	House Show	Bayamón, Puerto Rico	1	7		
40	Sweet Nancy	April 18, 2009	House Show	Aguas Buenas, Puerto Rico	2	21	This was a three-way match, also involving Killer Kat.	
41	Killer Kat	May 9, 2009	House Show	Caguas, Puerto Rico	3	281	This was a three-way match, also involving La Morena.	
—	Vacated	February 14, 2010	House Show	Bayamón, Puerto Rico	—	—		
42	La Morena	March 12, 2010	House Show	San Sebastian, Puerto Rico	1	8	Morena defeated Black Rose to win the vacant championship.	
43	Killer Kat	March 20, 2010	House Show	Bayamón, Puerto Rico	4	49		
44	Debbie Ross	May 8, 2010	House Show	Lajas, Puerto Rico	1	147		
45	Black Rose	October 2, 2010	House Show	Bayamón, Puerto Rico	3	126		
46	La Morena	February 5, 2011	House Show	Carolina, Puerto Rico	2	23		
—	Vacated	February 28, 2011	House Show	Bayamón, Puerto Rico	—	—	The championship was vacated When La Morena left from WWC.	
47	Black Rose	September 24, 2011	House Show	Caguas, Puerto Rico	4	69	Rose defeated Serena Deeb in a tournament final to win the vacant championship.	
—	Deactivated	December 2, 2011	House Show	Bayamón, Puerto Rico	—	—	The championship was retired.	
48	Stephany Amalbert	August 31, 2024	Aniversario 51	Bayamón, Puerto Rico	1	105	Amalbert defeated Amazona and Jazzy Yang in a 3-way match to win the vacant championship.	
49	Amazona	December 14, 2024	Lockout	Bayamón, Puerto Rico	2	133		
50	Elena Negroni	April 26, 2025	WWC House Show	Moca, Puerto Rico	1	287		
51	Stephany Amalbert	February 7, 2026	WWC House Show	Humacao, Puerto Rico	2	35		
52	Kamila	March 14, 2026	Camino a la Gloria	Bayamón, Puerto Rico	1	62		
53	Natalia Markova	May 16, 2026	Furia Extrema	Bayamón, Puerto Rico	1	42		Source
54	Amazona	June 27, 2026	Aniversario 53	San Juan, Puerto Rico	3	63		
55	Sai Pérez	August 29, 2026	La Noche Que No Necesita Nombre	Bayamón, Puerto Rico	1	7		

== Combined reigns ==
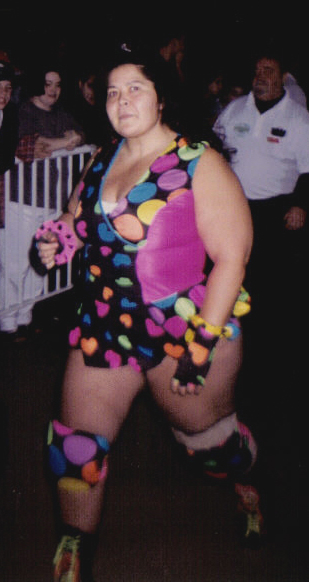
Eight-time WWC Women's Champion Monster Ripper

Rank	Wrestler	No. of reigns	Combined days
1	La Tigresa	3	1844
2	Monster Ripper	8	912
3	Wendi Richter	4	767
4	Killer Kat	4	617
5	Génesis	4	504
6	Candi Devine	4	495
7	Sasha	3	487
8	Elena Negroni	1	287
9	Black Rose	4	282
10	Misty Blue Simmes	1	208
11	Amazona	3	184
12	Stephany Amalbert	2	152
13	Debbie Ross	1	147
14	Sweet Nancy	2	98
15	Lady Demonique	3	96
16	Katrina KL	1	62
17	Natalia Markova	1	42
18	Jacqueline Moore	1	32
19	La Morena	2	31
20	Amarylis	1	30
21	Sara Jay-Evans	1	7
22	Sai Pérez	1	7+
