= Black Rose (wrestler) =

Puerto Rican professional wrestler

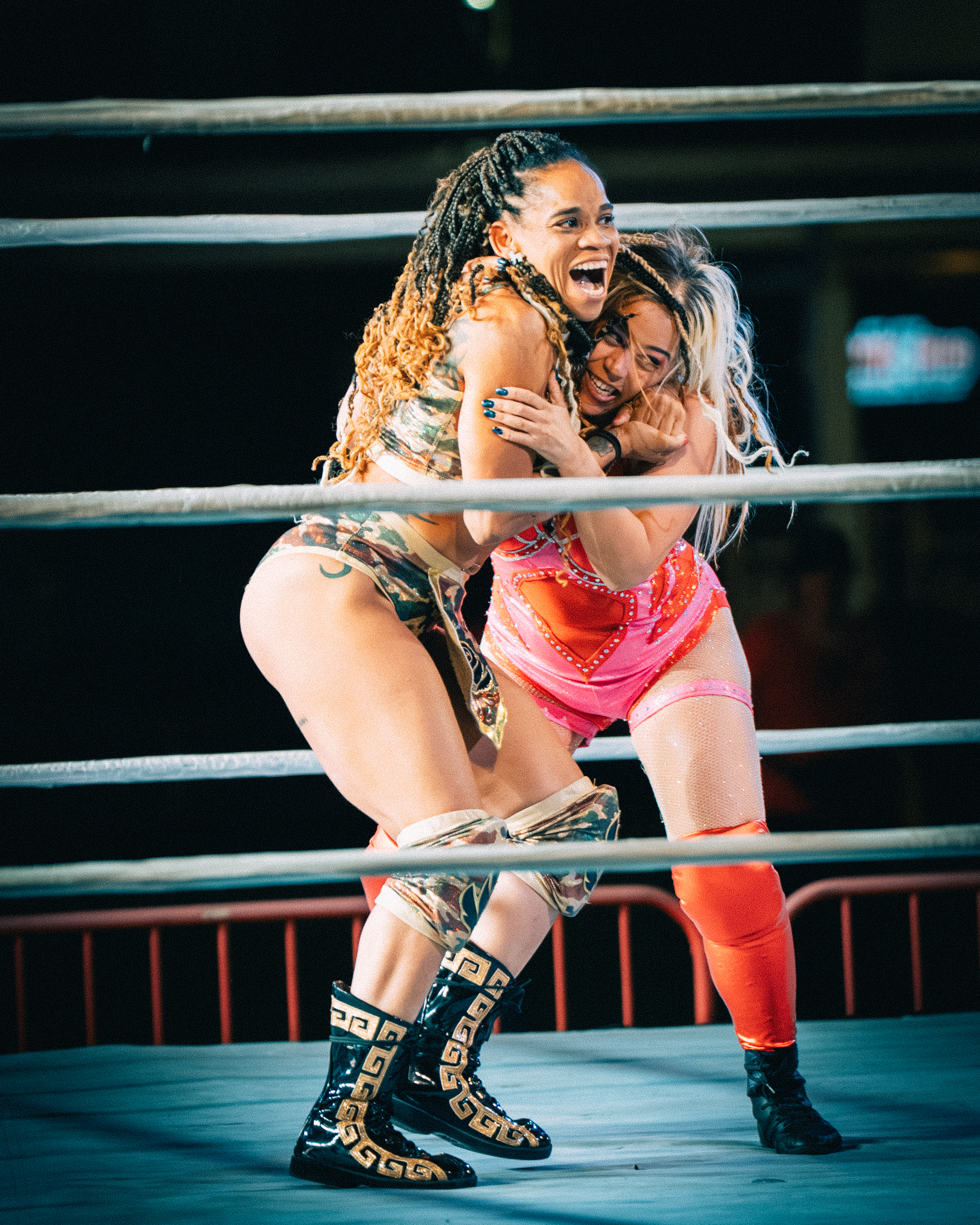
- Rose in April 2025

Personal information
- Born: Nilka García Solís; November 14, 1981 (age 44) Dorado, Puerto Rico

Professional wrestling career
- Ring name(s): Black Rose; La Rosa Negra; Rosa Negra; Scorpio Rosa
- Billed height: 5 ft 3 in (160 cm)
- Billed weight: 130 lb (59 kg)
- Debut: 2003

Nilka García Solís (born November 14, 1981) is a Puerto Rican professional wrestler. She is signed to the National Wrestling Alliance (NWA) known as Black Rose or La Rosa Negra.

== Professional wrestling career ==
García began wrestling in Puerto Rico. She worked in World Wrestling Council (WWC) where she became WWC Women's Champion four times.

=== Ring Warriors ===
On July 14, 2012, at Ring Warriors' Hollywood Heat Wave, Rosa defeated Sienna DuVall and Su Yung to become the first RW Battling Bombshells Champion. Rosa lost the title against DuVall on September 8, but she regained the title on September 29, 2012. Rosa retained the title for 3 years until March 28, 2015, when Rose lost the title against Santana Garrett in a match where Garrett's NWA Women's Championship was also on the line.

=== Shine (2013–2020) ===
Rose debuted in Shine at Shine 7 on February 22, 2013, in a three-way match won by Tina San Antonio, which also involved Luscious Latasha.

=== World Wonder Ring Stardom (2015, 2017) ===
In August 2015, García, under the ring name Rosa Negra, made her Japanese debut by taking part in World Wonder Ring Stardom's 2015 5★Star GP Tournament. While Kairi Hojo won the tournament, Rosa won the Best Technique Award. After aligning herself with the Oedo Tai stable, Rosa and stablemate Hudson Envy unsuccessfully challenged Io Shirai and Mayu Iwatani for the Goddesses of Stardom Championship on September 5. On September 23, Rosa defeated another stablemate, Star Fire, to win the High Speed Championship. She lost the title to Mayu Iwatani in her first defense on October 11. At Mask Fiesta 2015 on October 25, García, wrestling under the ring name Scorpio Rosa, teamed up with Black Dragon and Infernal KAORU in a loss to Mayuchica, Midnight Angel and Ultimo Dragon.

Rosa Negra returned to Stardom in 2017, taking part in a tournament to crown the new Artist of Stardom Champions on April 15. Rosa teamed with Hana Kimura and Kagetsu of Oedo Tai as they reached to the finals on April 15, where the eventually lost to Queen's Quest (AZM, HZK and Io Shirai).

=== National Wrestling Alliance (2023–present) ===
García, as La Rosa Negra, declared on the February 28, 2023 episode of NWA Powerrr, that she was utilizing her previously earned Champions Series title opportunity to challenge Kamille for the NWA World Women's Championship at NWA 312. Rosa was scheduled to wrestle on the first night of the Crockett Cup on June 3, however, Rosa missed the show after being involved in a car accident. NWA noted that Rosa is doing well and recovering. Rosa returned on the April 9, 2024, NWA's special episode, which was filmed on March 2, where she teamed with Ruthie Jay to defeat the team of Reka Theaka and Tiffany Nieves. On the June 18, during the first episode of the Crockett Cup, Rosa and Jay challenged Nieves and Tehaka to determine the number one contenders for the NWA World Women's Tag Team Championship, however, were unsuccessful.

== Championships and accomplishments ==
- Mission Pro Wrestling
  - MPW Championship (1 time)
  - MPW Championship Tournament (2020)
  - MPW Year-End Award (3 times)
    - Moment of the Year Award (2019) becoming the first MPW Champion
    - Wrestler of the Year Award (2020, 2021)
- Pro Wrestling Illustrated
  - Ranked No. 48 of the best 50 female wrestlers in the PWI Female 50 in 2015
- Pro Wrestling Syndicate
  - PWS Bombshells Championship (1 time)
  - Majestic Twelve (2012)
- Ring Warriors
  - Battling Bombshells Championship (2 times)
- Vendetta Pro Wrestling
  - Luna Vachon Cup (2015)
- World Wonder Ring Stardom
  - High Speed Championship (1 time)
  - 5★Star GP Award (1 time)
    - 5★Star GP Technique Award (2015)
- World Wrestling Council
  - WWC Women's Championship (4 times)
