= Rhonda Sing =

Canadian professional wrestler

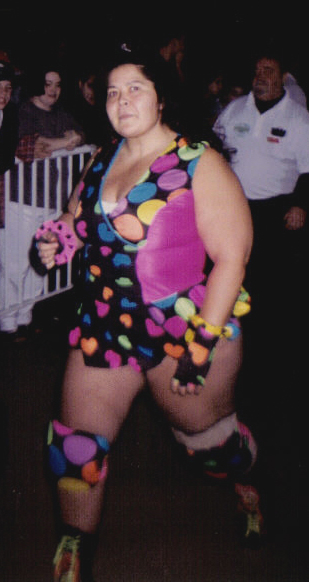
- Sing (as Bertha Faye) in 1995

Personal information
- Born: Rhonda Ann Sing; February 21, 1961 Calgary, Alberta, Canada
- Died: July 27, 2001 (aged 40) Calgary, Alberta, Canada
- Cause of death: Unknown

Professional wrestling career
- Ring name(s): Bertha Faye; Monster Ripper; La Monstra; Nitro Girl Beef; Rhonda Singh
- Billed height: 5 ft 7 in (170 cm)
- Billed weight: 260 lb (118 kg)
- Billed from: Walls, Mississippi, United States (as Bertha Faye)
- Trained by: Mildred Burke
- Debut: 1979
- Retired: 2000

Rhonda Ann Sing (February 21, 1961 – July 27, 2001) was a Canadian professional wrestler. After training with Mildred Burke, she wrestled in All Japan Women's Pro-Wrestling under the ring name Monster Ripper. In 1987, she returned to Canada and began working with Stampede Wrestling, where she was their first Stampede Women's Champion. In 1995, she worked in the World Wrestling Federation as the comedic character Bertha Faye, winning the WWF Women's Championship. She also wrestled in World Championship Wrestling to help generate interest in their women's division.

== Professional wrestling career ==
=== Training ===
While growing up in Calgary, Sing attended numerous Stampede Wrestling events with her mother. She knew she wanted to be a wrestler from a young age and frequently beat up the neighborhood children, along with those in her kindergarten class. As a teenager, Sing approached members of the Hart wrestling family and asked to be trained, but she was rejected as they did not train women wrestlers at the time. Bret Hart, however, claims it had more to do with scheduling conflicts. During a trip to Hawaii in 1978, she saw Japanese women's wrestling on television and decided she wanted to pursue the sport. She later wrote to Mildred Burke after a friend gave her a magazine with Burke's contact information, and sent her a biography and photo. Shortly thereafter, she joined Burke's training facility in Encino, California.

=== Japan, Canada, Mexico and Puerto Rico (1979–1995) ===
After a few weeks of training with Burke, Sing was scouted by All Japan Women's Pro-Wrestling (AJW), despite her inexperience. Sing's debut match in Japan was a tag team match with partner Mami Kumano, defeating the Beauty Pair (Jackie Sato and Maki Ueda) in January 1979. In Japan, she began wrestling under the name Monster Ripper. Although she found adjusting to the Japanese culture difficult, Sing held AJW's premier title, the WWWA World Single Championship, on two occasions and was the first Calgary born wrestler to gain success in Japan. During her time in the company, the Japanese female wrestlers gave her a hard time because they did not like losing to foreigners. Sing also had difficulty because of her youth and inexperience in the ring. Sing, however, was comforted by New Japan Pro-Wrestling's Dynamite Kid, who had trained in Calgary. Sing won the WWWA World Single Championship from Jackie Sato on July 31, 1979. Despite losing the title to Sato six weeks later, she regained it on March 15, 1980. The title was vacated in August 1980.

After another stint in Japan, Sing returned to Stampede Wrestling in late 1987 and was renamed Rhonda Singh by Bruce Hart, the owner of the company. There were plans to pair her with Gama Singh, but they never came to fruition. During 1987, she was named their first Women's Champion because she had defeated Wendi Richter prior to returning to Stampede. She held the title until September 22, 1988, when she lost to Chigusa Nagayo.

Over the next few years, Sing once again traveled throughout the world and wrestled for a number of companies, holding several titles. Between 1987 and 1990, Sing worked in Puerto Rico for the World Wrestling Council (WWC), where she held the WWC Women's Championship on five occasions by defeating Wendi Richter, Candi Devine, and Sasha in matches for the title. As Monster Ripper on the WWC 18th Anniversary Show on July 6, 1991, she faced and beat El Profe in an intergender match.

In 1992 she worked as La Monstra for Asistencia Asesoría y Administración in Mexico, where she won the WWA World Women's Title.

=== World Wrestling Federation (1995) ===
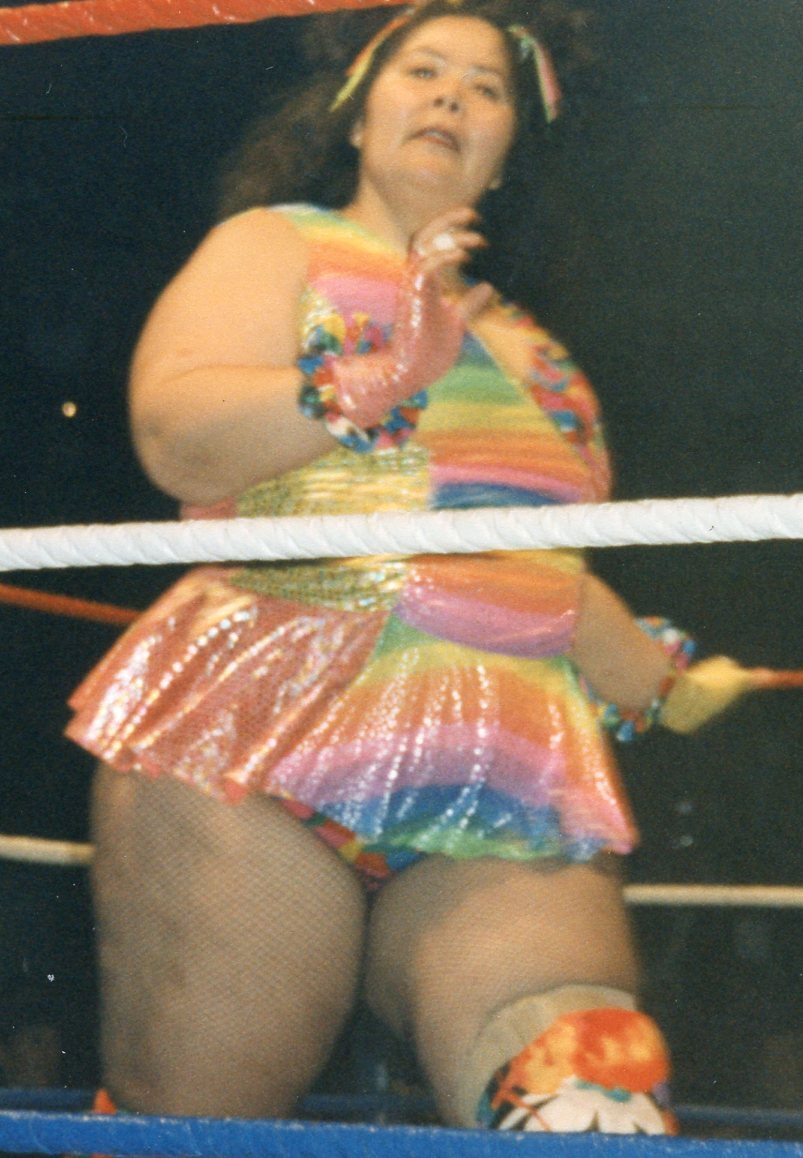
Sing (as "Bertha Faye") in 1995

In 1995, Sing was contacted by the World Wrestling Federation to help their ailing women's division. She was repackaged as "Bertha Faye", a comedic character who lived in a trailer park and dated Harvey Wippleman. WWF management originally wanted her to have an on-screen feud with Bull Nakano, but there was a change of plans after Nakano was charged with cocaine possession.

Sing made her WWF debut on the April 3, 1995, episode of Monday Night Raw participating in a sneak attack on Alundra Blayze, making it appear as if Blayze's nose had been broken. At SummerSlam on August 27, Faye defeated Blayze for the WWF Women's Championship, holding the title until the October 23 airing of Monday Night Raw, where Blayze regained the title, ending Faye's reign at 57 days. As the WWF continued to neglect their women's division, Sing became tired of working there. Moreover, she was frustrated with her Faye gimmick, once recalling that she felt like a prostitute due to the sexualized and comical way that she was often portrayed. WWF management asked her not to perform the same power moves as the male wrestlers, so instead, Faye was forced to act as comic relief. After a year with the company, Sing asked for a release from her contract. She briefly returned to Japan but did not like the new system, which did not guarantee payouts.

=== Return to Mexico and Canada (1995–1999) ===
After leaving the WWF, Sing returned to AAA in Mexico in 1996. During this period, she also worked in the independent circuit in Alberta,Canada.

Working with CanAm Wrestling where she would add another World Women's Championship.

=== World Championship Wrestling (1999–2000) ===
In late 1999, she worked with World Championship Wrestling (WCW) briefly, appearing on several telecasts to help generate interest in a women's division. She was also a contender for both the WCW Cruiserweight Championship and WCW Hardcore Championship. In addition to competing in matches using her Singh and Monster Ripper gimmicks, she also appeared with the Nitro Girls dance troupe providing comic relief.

== Personal life ==
Rhonda was born in Calgary on February 21, 1961, to Jack Mah Sing, a grocery store operator, and Elsie Beatrice Sing. She had Chinese ancestry on her father's side. She was one of four children, having three brothers. She spoke fluent Japanese and Spanish. Backstage, Sing was friends with the male, rather than the female, wrestlers. During her time in the WWF, she developed a close friendship with Owen Hart. After leaving WCW, Sing took a break from wrestling. In 2001, she worked as a caregiver to the handicapped.

On July 27, 2001, Sing died at the age of 40. She never married or had children. Sing was buried on August 3, 2001, in Mountain View Cemetery in Calgary, and her funeral was attended by fellow wrestlers including Bret Hart, Stu Hart, Davey Boy Smith, Smith Hart, Allen Coage, and Ben Bassarab.

== Championships and accomplishments ==
- All Japan Women's Pro-Wrestling
  - IWA World Women's Championship (1 time)
  - WWWA World Single Championship (2 times)
  - AJW Hall of Fame (1998)
- Cauliflower Alley Club
  - Posthumous Award (2003)
- Stampede Wrestling
  - Stampede Women's Championship (1 time)
- World Wrestling Association
  - WWA Women's Championship (1 time)
- World Wrestling Council
  - WWC Women's Championship (8 times)
  - AWA World Women's Championship (1 time; unofficial) ^{1}
- World Wrestling Federation
  - WWF Women's Championship (1 time)

1 The WWC briefly recognized Sing, then wrestling as Monster Ripper, as the AWA World Women's Champion following her victory over Candi Devine on July 7, 1990. However, the American Wrestling Association did not recognize Sing's title win.

== See also ==
- List of premature professional wrestling deaths
