= Filipino Pro Wrestling =

Filipino professional wrestling promotion

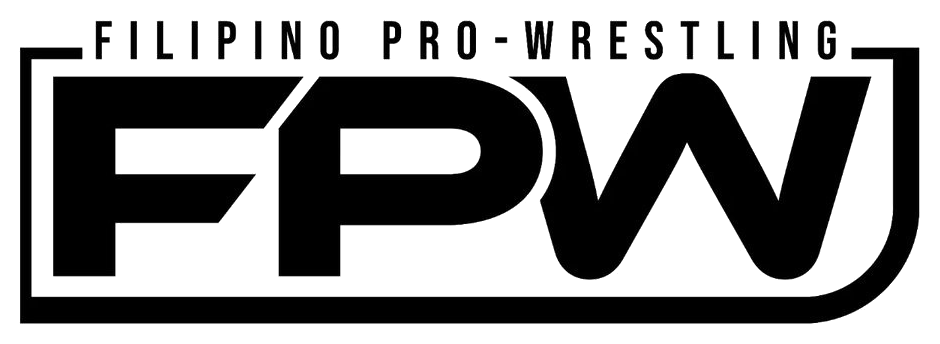
- Acronym: FPW
- Founded: 2022
- Style: Professional wrestling
- Headquarters: Metro Manila, Philippines
- Owner: Red Ollero
- Website: Filipino Pro Wrestling

Filipino Pro Wrestling (FPW) is a Filipino professional wrestling promotion based in Metro Manila, Philippines. FPW has two singles championships: the FPW Championship and the FPW Metro Manila Championship.

== History ==
Filipino Pro Wrestling (FPW) was established in 2022 following the easing of the COVID-19 lockdowns in the Philippines. The promotion is led by President Red Ollero, who also portrays an on-screen authority figure. He is also a comedian and former professional wrestler. He previously served as the president of the now-defunct Philippine Wrestling Revolution (PWR). The promotion held its inaugural event, "FPW: Unfinished Business", on October 16, 2022, at the Power Mac Center Spotlight in Makati City, Metro Manila. While the promotion primarily features a roster of local Filipino talent, its events have included appearances by internationally recognized wrestlers, such as Kushida and Filipino-American wrestler Jeff Cobb. The promotion has continued to expand its international reach; the 2025 edition of the annual Unfinished Business event featured a collaborative showcase with wrestlers from the Singapore-based promotion GrappleMax Pro Wrestling.

FPW focuses on creating digital content. Events are filmed in an episodic format, intended for digital distribution rather than relying solely on the live event experience. To facilitate this, FPW partnered with the production company Transcend Studios to produce series that integrate in-ring matches with backstage segments and promos. The first taping for the promotion's digital series, titled Astig!, took place on February 19, 2023, at the Power Mac Center Spotlight in Makati City. On March 8, 2026, at Astig!: Kushida vs Quatro, FPW announced a new show concept set in Quezon City, Metro Manila called "Pagsubok sa QC". The first event occurred on April 12.

=== FPW Secret Base ===
On February 4, 2023, the promotion established a dedicated training facility known as the FPW Secret Base. The venue is situated in a repurposed ballroom within the Kowloon House restaurant on Matalino St., Quezon City, Metro Manila, and is owned by FPW Executive Producer Tim Ng. The establishment of the facility marked a technical shift for the local professional wrestling industry through the introduction of a specialized wrestling ring. Unlike the mats or boxing rings used in previous local training – which lack the specific structural requirements for the sport – the FPW ring is constructed with wood, shock absorbers, and foam specifically designed to protect wrestlers when taking bumps. The Secret Base also serves as the venue for the promotion's "Secret Show" events and "Pagsubok sa QC" (Tagalog for "Trial in QC") events.

== Championships and accomplishments ==
=== Current champions ===
Championship	Current champion(s)	Reign	Date won	Days held	Location	Notes	Ref
FPW Championship	Cali Nueva	1	September 27, 2026	52	Makati, Metro Manila, Philippines	Defeated Quatro at Unfinished Business.	
FPW Metro Manila Championship	Jan Evander	1	April 12, 2026	220	Quezon City, Metro Manila, Philippines	Defeated Ralph Imabayashi at Pagsubok sa QC.	

=== FPW Championship ===
FPW Championship
- The FPW Championship belt, minus the outer side plates

Details
- Promotion: Filipino Pro Wrestling
- Date established: April 23, 2023
- Current champion: Cali Nueva
- Date won: September 27, 2026
Statistics
- First champion: Mike Madrigal
- Most reigns: Quatro (2 reigns)
- Longest reign: Mike Madrigal (546 days)
- Shortest reign: Kushida (133 days)
- Oldest champion: Kushida (42 years, 300 days)
- Youngest champion: Mike Madrigal (31–32 years)
- Heaviest champion: Jeff Cobb (119 kg (262 lb))
- Lightest champion: Quatro (73 kg (161 lb))

The FPW Championship is a professional wrestling world championship created and promoted by Filipino Pro Wrestling (FPW). Announced on April 23, 2023, it is the promotion's primary and most prestigious championship. As of November 18, 2026, there have been five reigns among four champions with one vacancy. The inaugural champion was Mike Madrigal, who held the title the longest at 546 days. Meanwhile, Kushida held the title the shortest at 133 days. Quatro has the most reigns at two. Kushida is the oldest champion at 42 years and 300 days, while Madrigal is the youngest at 31–32.

Cali Nueva is the current champion in his first reign. He won the title by defeating Quatro at Unfinished Business on September 27, 2026, in Makati, Metro Manila, Philippines.

Key
No.	Overall reign number
Reign	Reign number for the specific champion
Days	Number of days held

No.	Champion	Championship change			Reign statistics		Notes	Ref.
No.	Champion	Date	Event	Location	Reign	Days	Notes	Ref.
1	Mike Madrigal	April 23, 2023	Astig!	Makati, Metro Manila, Philippines	1	546	Defeated Ralph Imabayashi and Cali Nueva in a three-way match in the tournament final to become the inaugural champion.	
2	Jeff Cobb	October 20, 2024	Astig!	Makati, Metro Manila, Philippines	1	231		
—	Vacated	June 8, 2025	Secret Show 3	Quezon City, Metro Manila, Philippines	—	—	At WWE Backlash on May 10, 2025, Jeff Cobb made his WWE debut. FPW President Red Ollero announced that Cobb relinquished the title as he had signed with WWE.	
3	Quatro	July 13, 2025	Astig!	Makati, Metro Manila, Philippines	1	238	FPW President Red Ollero crowned Quatro as the new champion.	
4	Kushida	March 8, 2026	Astig!: Kushida vs Quatro	Makati, Metro Manila, Philippines	1	133	This was a Winner Takes All match for the FPW Championship and the MLW World Middleweight Championship.	
5	Quatro	July 19, 2026	Astig! sa Makati	Makati, Metro Manila, Philippines	2	70	This triple threat match also featured Matira Matibay winner Cali Nueva.	
6	Cali Nueva	September 27, 2026	Unfinished Business	Makati, Metro Manila, Philippines	1	52+		

==== Combined reigns ====
†	Indicates the current champion

Rank	Wrestler	No. of reigns	Combined days
1	Mike Madrigal	1	546
2	Quatro	2	308
3	Jeff Cobb	1	231
4	Kushida	1	133
5	Cali Nueva †	1	52+

=== FPW Metro Manila Championship ===
FPW Metro Manila Championship
- The FPW Metro Manila Championship belt

Details
- Promotion: Filipino Pro Wrestling
- Date established: June 22, 2025
- Current champion: Jan Evander
- Date won: April 12, 2026
Statistics
- First champion: Ralph Imabayashi

The FPW Metro Manila Championship is a professional wrestling championship created and promoted by Filipino Pro Wrestling (FPW). The title was introduced on June 22, 2025, with a tournament held to crown the inaugural champion that began on July 13. As of November 18, 2026, there have been two reigns among two champions. Ralph Imabayashi is the inaugural champion.

Inaugural FPW Metro Manila Championship Tournament

Qualifiers; Astig! July 13, 2025
Ralph Imabayashi	Win
Rex Lawin	—
Duke Ortega	Win
Proximo	—
Jason Rex	Win
Robynn	—
Thiago	—
Mharckie	Win

Championship match Astig! September 14, 2025
Ralph Imabayashi	Win
Duke Ortega	—
Jason Rex	—
Mharckie	—

Jan Evander is the current champion in his first reign. He won the title by defeating Ralph Imabayashi at Pagsubok sa QC on April 12, 2026, in Quezon City, Metro Manila, Philippines.

Key
No.	Overall reign number
Reign	Reign number for the specific champion
Days	Number of days held

No.	Champion	Championship change			Reign statistics		Notes	Ref.
No.	Champion	Date	Event	Location	Reign	Days	Notes	Ref.
1	Ralph Imabayashi	September 14, 2025	Astig	Makati, Metro Manila, Philippines	1	210	Defeated Duke Ortega, Jason Rex, and Mharckie in the four-way tournament final to become the inaugural champion.	
2	Jan Evander	April 12, 2026	Pagsubok sa QC	Quezon City, Metro Manila, Philippines	1	220+		

=== Matira Matibay match ===
The Matira Matibay match is a 20-wrestler Gauntlet Eliminator. Two wrestlers begin the match with a new wrestler entering the match every 90 seconds until all 20 wrestlers have entered the match. Eliminations occur only by pinfall or submission. The last wrestler remaining wins the match and earns a future FPW Championship match. The inaugural match was held at Matira Matibay on May 17, 2026, and was won by Cali Nueva, who failed to win the FPW Championship in a triple threat match against previous champion Kushida and Quatro at Astig! sa Makati on July 19; Quatro reclaimed the FPW Championship.

== See also ==
- List of professional wrestling promotions
