= Takumi Adachi =

Japanese wrestler (born 1966)

Takumi Adachi (安達 巧, Adachi Takumi; born 11 April 1966) is a Japanese former wrestler who competed in the 1992 Summer Olympics.
