= G1 Climax 31 =

2021 edition of the G1 Climax

- G1 Climax 31 logo
- Promotion: New Japan Pro-Wrestling
- Date: September 18–October 21, 2021
- City: See venues
- Venue: See venues
- Tagline: Max the Max

Event chronology
← Previous; Wrestle Grand Slam in MetLife Dome	Next → NJPW Strong: Autumn Attack; Road to Power Struggle

G1 Climax chronology
← Previous; G1 Climax 30	Next → G1 Climax 32

G1 Climax 31
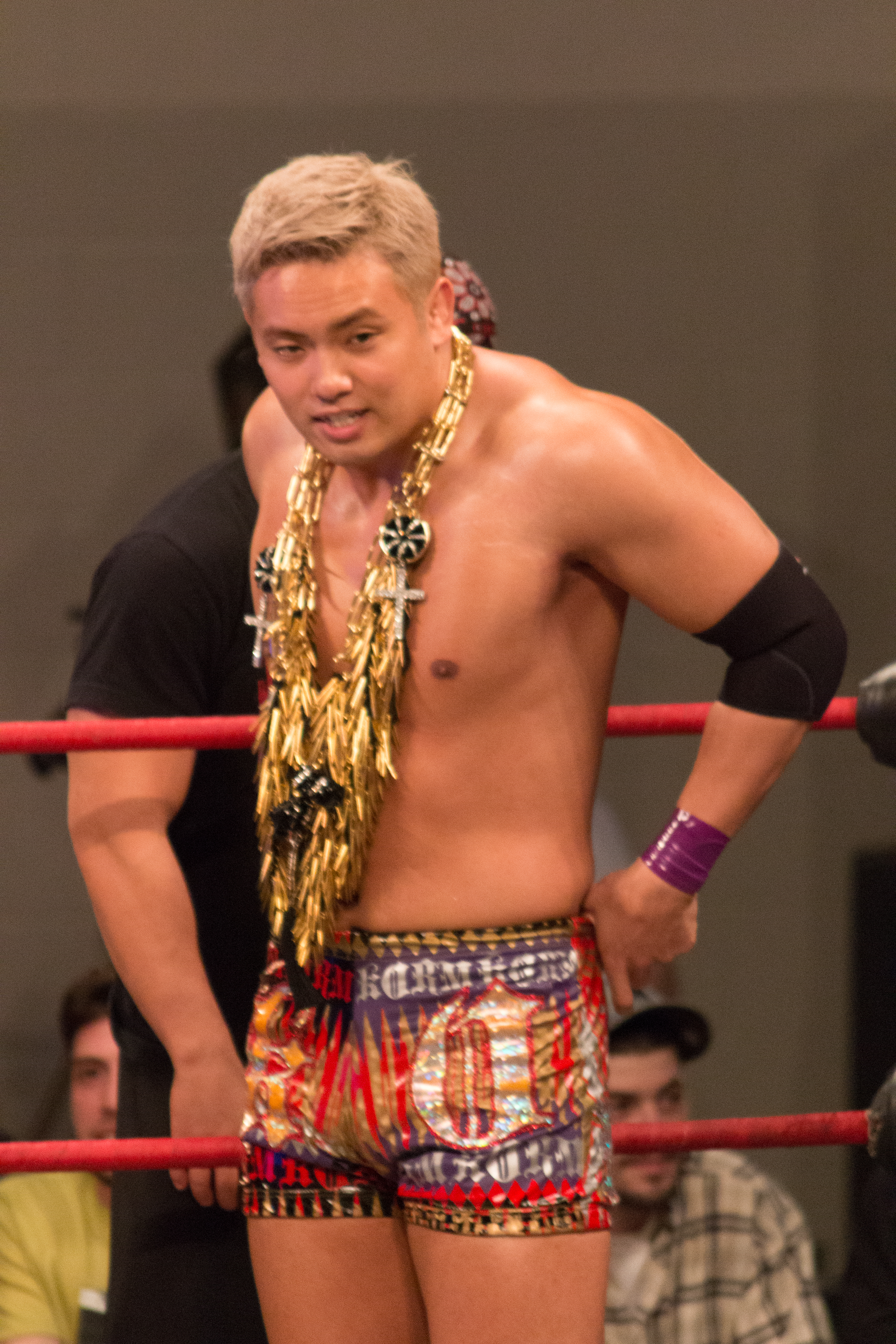
- Kazuchika Okada, winner of G1 Climax 31

Tournament information
- Sport: Professional wrestling
- Location: Japan
- Dates: September 18, 2021–October 21, 2021
- Tournament format: Two-block round-robin tournament
- Participants: 20

Final positions
- Champion: Kazuchika Okada
- Runner-up: Kota Ibushi

Tournament statistics
- Bouts fought: 91

The G1 Climax 31 was a professional wrestling tournament promoted by New Japan Pro-Wrestling (NJPW). The tournament commenced on September 18 and concluded on October 21, 2021. It is the thirty-first edition of G1 Climax, and forty-seventh edition of the tournament counting its previous forms under different names. B block winner Kazuchika Okada defeated A Block winner Kota Ibushi by referee stoppage after Ibushi suffered an arm injury when he attempted to perform a Phoenix Splash on Okada, forcing referee Red Shoes Unno to stop the match.

Considered NJPW's most important tournament, the G1 Climax features twenty wrestlers, divided in two blocks of ten ("A" and "B"). Each participant faces all nine other wrestlers within the same block in singles matches. The winner of each block is determined via a point system, with two points for a win, one point for a draw, and no points for a defeat. Each night of the event sees the ten members of one block compete. On the final day of the event, the winners of each block face each other to determine the winner of the tournament, who also receives a future match for the IWGP World Heavyweight Championship at Wrestle Kingdom. The event is broadcast live on TV Asahi and Fighting TV Samurai in Japan, and New Japan Pro-Wrestling World worldwide.

The event saw the G1 Climax debut of Great-O-Khan, Tanga Loa, and Chase Owens. Tetsuya Naito suffered a legitimate knee injury during his match against Zack Sabre Jr. in the tournament's opening night, forcing him to forfeit the remainder of his matches.

== Production ==
Other on-screen personnel
Role:	Name:
English Commentators	Kevin Kelly
English Commentators	Chris Charlton (nights 1–4, 6, 7, 10, 17–19)
Japanese Commentators	Kazuki Kusanagi (nights 17 & 18)
Japanese Commentators	Haruo Murata (nights 3, 6, 8, 11, 12, 15, 16)
Japanese Commentators	Hiroki Mikami (nights 13 & 19)
Japanese Commentators	Jyushin Thunder Liger (nights 1, 2, 11)
Japanese Commentators	Miki Motoi (nights 10 & 19)
Japanese Commentators	Milano Collection A.T.
Japanese Commentators	Shigeki Kiyono (nights 4, 7, 9, 10, 14)
Japanese Commentators	Shunpei Terakawa (nights 1, 2, 5)
Japanese Commentators	Yohei Ohnishi (nights 1 & 2)
Japanese Commentators	Yuichi Tabata (nights 1, 2, 5, 13, 17–19)
Ring announcers	Kimihiko Ozaki
Ring announcers	Makoto Abe
Referees	Kenta Sato
Referees	Yuya Sakamoto
Referees	Marty Asami
Referees	Red Shoes Unno

=== Tournament rules ===
The tournament features twenty wrestlers, divided in two blocks of ten ("A" and "B"). Each participant faces all nine other wrestler within the same block in singles matches, with the winner of each block being determined via a point system, gaining two points for a win, one point for a draw, and no point for a loss; each night of the event sees the ten members of a same block compete for the tournament. In case of several wrestler sharing the top score, the results of the matches those wrestlers had when facing each other in the tournament act as tiebreaker, with the one having the most wins over the other top-scorers determining the winner of the block.

On the final day of the event, the respective winners of both blocks face each other to determine the winner of the G1 Climax, who would gain a future match for the IWGP Heavyweight Championship, NJPW's top championship, at Wrestle Kingdom, NJPW's biggest yearly event; if the IWGP Heavyweight Champion himself wins, he gets to pick his opponent at Wrestle Kingdom. The Young Lion matches have a fifteen-minutes time limit, while the matches of the tournament have a 30-minutes time limit (with the time limit being reached resulting in a tie); the final match between the two block winners has no time limit.

=== History ===
On July 8, 2021, NJPW announced that the 2021 edition of the G1 Climax would take place from September to October due to 2020 Summer Olympics was delayed to 2021. During night 2 of Wrestle Grand Slam in MetLife Dome on September 5, NJPW announced the full tournament bracket for the G1 Climax.

=== Storylines ===
The event includes matches that result from scripted storylines, where wrestlers portray heroes, villains, or less distinguishable characters in scripted events that build tension and culminate in a wrestling match or series of matches.

=== Venues ===
Dates	Venue	Location
September 18	Osaka Prefectural Gymnasium	Namba, Osaka
September 19	Osaka Prefectural Gymnasium	Namba, Osaka
September 23	Ota City General Gymnasium	Ōta, Tokyo
September 24	Ota City General Gymnasium	Ōta, Tokyo
September 26	World Memorial Hall	Chūō-ku, Kobe
September 29	Korakuen Hall	Bunkyo, Tokyo
September 30	Korakuen Hall	Bunkyo, Tokyo
October 1	Hamamatsu Arena	Hamamatsu, Shizuoka
October 3	Aichi Prefectural Gymnasium	Nagoya, Aichi
October 4	Korakuen Hall	Bunkyo, Tokyo
October 7	Hiroshima Sun Plaza	Nishi-ku, Hiroshima
October 8	Kochi Prefectural Gymnasium	Kōchi, Kōchi
October 9	Osaka Prefectural Gymnasium	Namba, Osaka
October 12	Xebio Arena Sendai	Sendai, Miyagi
October 13	Xebio Arena Sendai	Sendai, Miyagi
October 14	Yamagata City General Sports Center	Tendo, Yamagata
October 18	Yokohama Budokan	Naka-ku, Yokohama
October 20	Nippon Budokan	Chiyoda, Tokyo
October 21	Nippon Budokan	Chiyoda, Tokyo

== Matches ==
=== Night 1 (A Block) ===
The first night of A Block took place on September 18, 2021, at Osaka Prefectural Gymnasium in Namba, Osaka. Tetsuya Naito legitimately injured his knee during his match on Night 1 and had to withdraw from the rest of the competition as a result.

No.	Results	Stipulations	Times
1	Sho defeated Ryohei Oiwa	Singles match	6:08
2	Yujiro Takahashi defeated Kota Ibushi	Singles match for the G1 Climax tournament	11:31
3	Great-O-Khan defeated Tanga Loa	Singles match for the G1 Climax tournament	17:45
4	Toru Yano defeated Kenta	Singles match for the G1 Climax tournament	11:07
5	Zack Sabre Jr. defeated Tetsuya Naito by submission	Singles match for the G1 Climax tournament	27:05
6	Shingo Takagi defeated Tomohiro Ishii	Singles match for the G1 Climax tournament	27:56

==== Tournament scores ====
Rank	Wrestler	Result	Points	
Rank	Wrestler	Result	Pre	Post
1	Toru Yano	Win	0	2
1	Yujiro Takahashi	Win	0	2
1	Great-O-Khan	Win	0	2
1	Zack Sabre Jr.	Win	0	2
1	Shingo Takagi	Win	0	2
2	Tomohiro Ishii	Loss	0	0
2	Tetsuya Naito	Loss	0	0
2	Tanga Loa	Loss	0	0
2	Kota Ibushi	Loss	0	0
2	Kenta	Loss	0	0

=== Night 2 (B Block) ===
The first night of B Block took place on September 19, 2021, at Osaka Prefectural Gymnasium in Namba, Osaka.

No.	Results	Stipulations	Times
1	Sho defeated Kosei Fujita by referee stoppage	Singles match	8:09
2	Evil defeated Yoshi-Hashi	Singles match for the G1 Climax tournament	17:15
3	Jeff Cobb defeated Chase Owens	Singles match for the G1 Climax tournament	12:11
4	Sanada defeated Tama Tonga	Singles match for the G1 Climax tournament	19:04
5	Taichi defeated Hirooki Goto	Singles match for the G1 Climax tournament	18:30
6	Kazuchika Okada defeated Hiroshi Tanahashi	Singles match for the G1 Climax tournament	29:36

==== Tournament scores ====
Rank	Wrestler	Result	Points	
Rank	Wrestler	Result	Pre	Post
1	Jeff Cobb	Win	0	2
1	Evil	Win	0	2
1	Taichi	Win	0	2
1	Sanada	Win	0	2
1	Kazuchika Okada	Win	0	2
2	Hiroshi Tanahashi	Loss	0	0
2	Tama Tonga	Loss	0	0
2	Hirooki Goto	Loss	0	0
2	Yoshi-Hashi	Loss	0	0
2	Chase Owens	Loss	0	0

=== Night 3 (A Block) ===
The second night of A Block took place on September 23, 2021, at Ota City General Gymnasium in Ōta, Tokyo.

No.	Results	Stipulations	Times
1	Tanga Loa defeated Yuji Nagata	Singles match	15:35
2	Great-O-Khan defeated Toru Yano	Singles match for the G1 Climax tournament	11:30
3	Kenta defeated Yujiro Takahashi	Singles match for the G1 Climax tournament	15:48
4	Kota Ibushi defeated Tomohiro Ishii	Singles match for the G1 Climax tournament	17:42
5	Zack Sabre Jr. defeated Shingo Takagi by submission	Singles match for the G1 Climax tournament	27:17

==== Tournament scores ====
Rank	Wrestler	Result	Points	
Rank	Wrestler	Result	Pre	Post
1	Great-O-Khan	Win	4	6
2	Zack Sabre Jr.	Win	2	4
2	Kenta	Win	2	4
2	Kota Ibushi	Win	2	4
2	Shingo Takagi	Loss	4	4
2	Toru Yano	Loss	4	4
2	Yujiro Takahashi	Loss	4	4
3	Tomohiro Ishii	Loss	2	2
3	Tanga Loa	Win (Note: Tetsuya Naito suffered a legitimate knee injury in his first round match against Zack Sabre Jr. All of Naito's remaining tournament matches were pre-emptively declared forfeit wins for his opponents.)	2	2
4	Tetsuya Naito	Loss	0	0

=== Night 4 (B Block) ===
The second night of B Block took place on September 24, 2021, at Ota City General Gymnasium in Ōta, Tokyo.

No.	Results	Stipulations	Times
1	Hiroshi Tanahashi defeated Hirooki Goto	Singles match for the G1 Climax tournament	14:10
2	Tama Tonga defeated Chase Owens	Singles match for the G1 Climax tournament	12:59
3	Jeff Cobb defeated Yoshi-Hashi	Singles match for the G1 Climax tournament	13:21
4	Taichi defeated Sanada	Singles match for the G1 Climax tournament	25:15
5	Kazuchika Okada defeated Evil	Singles match for the G1 Climax tournament	21:46

==== Tournament scores ====
Rank	Wrestler	Result	Points	
Rank	Wrestler	Result	Pre	Post
1	Jeff Cobb	Win	2	4
1	Taichi	Win	2	4
1	Kazuchika Okada	Win	2	4
2	Sanada	Loss	2	2
2	Evil	Loss	2	2
2	Hiroshi Tanahashi	Win	0	2
2	Tama Tonga	Win	0	2
3	Yoshi-Hashi	Loss	0	0
3	Hirooki Goto	Loss	0	0
3	Chase Owens	Loss	0	0

=== Night 5 (A Block) ===
The third night of A Block took place on September 26, 2021, at World Memorial Hall in Chūō-ku, Kobe.

No.	Results	Stipulations	Times
1	Master Wato defeated Kosei Fujita	Singles match	6:21
2	Shingo Takagi defeated Yuji Nagata	Singles match	16:51
3	Great-O-Khan defeated Yujiro Takahashi	Singles match for the G1 Climax tournament	14:15
4	Toru Yano defeated Tanga Loa	Singles match for the G1 Climax tournament	10:46
5	Kenta defeated Tomohiro Ishii	Singles match for the G1 Climax tournament	21:08
6	Zack Sabre Jr. defeated Kota Ibushi by submission	Singles match for the G1 Climax tournament	19:55

==== Tournament scores ====
Rank	Wrestler	Result	Points	
Rank	Wrestler	Result	Pre	Post
1	Great-O-Khan	Win	6	8
2	Zack Sabre Jr.	Win	4	6
2	Kenta	Win	4	6
2	Toru Yano	Win	4	6
3	Shingo Takagi	Win	4	4
3	Kota Ibushi	Loss	4	4
3	Yujiro Takahashi	Loss	4	4
4	Tomohiro Ishii	Loss	2	2
4	Tanga Loa	Loss	2	2
5	Tetsuya Naito	Loss	0	0

=== Night 6 (B Block) ===
The third night of B Block took place on September 29, 2021, at Korakuen Hall in Bunkyo, Tokyo.

No.	Results	Stipulations	Times
1	Evil defeated Taichi by referee stoppage	Singles match for the G1 Climax tournament	11:30
2	Sanada defeated Chase Owens	Singles match for the G1 Climax tournament	11:58
3	Jeff Cobb defeated Hirooki Goto	Singles match for the G1 Climax tournament	15:08
4	Hiroshi Tanahashi defeated Tama Tonga	Singles match for the G1 Climax tournament	14:17
5	Kazuchika Okada defeated Yoshi-Hashi	Singles match for the G1 Climax tournament	26:53

==== Tournament scores ====
Rank	Wrestler	Result	Points	
Rank	Wrestler	Result	Pre	Post
1	Jeff Cobb	Win	4	6
1	Kazuchika Okada	Win	4	6
2	Hiroshi Tanahashi	Win	2	4
2	Sanada	Win	2	4
2	Taichi	Loss	4	4
2	Evil	Win	2	4
3	Tama Tonga	Loss	2	2
4	Yoshi-Hashi	Loss	0	0
4	Hirooki Goto	Loss	0	0
4	Chase Owens	Loss	0	0

=== Night 7 (A Block) ===
The fourth night of A Block took place on September 30, 2021, at Korakuen Hall in Bunkyo, Tokyo.

No.	Results	Stipulations	Times
1	Yujiro Takahashi defeated Bushi	Singles match	13:01
2	Tomohiro Ishii defeated Tanga Loa	Singles match for the G1 Climax tournament	16:18
3	Zack Sabre Jr. defeated Great-O-Khan by submission	Singles match for the G1 Climax tournament	15:26
4	Kota Ibushi defeated Toru Yano	Singles match for the G1 Climax tournament	4:03
5	Shingo Takagi defeated Kenta	Singles match for the G1 Climax tournament	23:56

==== Tournament scores ====
Rank	Wrestler	Result	Points	
Rank	Wrestler	Result	Pre	Post
1	Zack Sabre Jr.	Win	6	8
1	Great-O-Khan	Loss	8	8
2	Shingo Takagi	Win	4	6
2	Kenta	Loss	6	6
2	Toru Yano	Loss	6	6
2	Kota Ibushi	Win	4	6
3	Yujiro Takahashi	Win	4	4
3	Tomohiro Ishii	Win	2	4
4	Tanga Loa	Loss	2	2
5	Tetsuya Naito	Loss	0	0

=== Night 8 (B Block) ===
The fourth night of B Block took place on October 1, 2021, at Hamamatsu Arena in Hamamatsu, Shizuoka.

No.	Results	Stipulations	Times
1	Yoshinobu Kanemaru defeated Ryohei Oiwa	Singles match	7:36
2	Jeff Cobb defeated Tama Tonga	Singles match for the G1 Climax tournament	12:47
3	Evil defeated Chase Owens	Singles match for the G1 Climax tournament	12:38
4	Yoshi-Hashi defeated Taichi	Singles match for the G1 Climax tournament	22:26
5	Kazuchika Okada defeated Hirooki Goto	Singles match for the G1 Climax tournament	18:06
6	Hiroshi Tanahashi defeated Sanada	Singles match for the G1 Climax tournament	25:36

==== Tournament scores ====
Rank	Wrestler	Result	Points	
Rank	Wrestler	Result	Pre	Post
1	Jeff Cobb	Win	6	8
1	Kazuchika Okada	Win	6	8
2	Evil	Win	4	6
2	Hiroshi Tanahashi	Win	4	6
3	Sanada	Loss	4	4
3	Taichi	Loss	4	4
4	Tama Tonga	Loss	2	2
4	Yoshi-Hashi	Win	0	2
5	Chase Owens	Loss	0	0
5	Hirooki Goto	Loss	0	0

=== Night 9 (A Block) ===
The fifth night of A Block took place on October 3, 2021, at Aichi Prefectural Gymnasium in Naka-ku, Nagoya.

No.	Results	Stipulations	Times
1	Yoshinobu Kanemaru defeated Kosei Fujita by submission	Singles match	7:34
2	Toru Yano defeated Bushi	Singles match	7:14
3	Kenta defeated Great-O-Khan	Singles match for the G1 Climax tournament	19:39
4	Tanga Loa defeated Yujiro Takahashi	Singles match for the G1 Climax tournament	12:36
5	Tomohiro Ishii defeated Zack Sabre Jr.	Singles match for the G1 Climax tournament	18:40
6	Kota Ibushi defeated Shingo Takagi	Singles match for the G1 Climax tournament	23:57

==== Tournament scores ====
Rank	Wrestler	Result	Points	
Rank	Wrestler	Result	Pre	Post
1	Zack Sabre Jr.	Loss	8	8
1	Great-O-Khan	Loss	8	8
1	Kenta	Win	6	8
1	Kota Ibushi	Win	6	8
2	Shingo Takagi	Loss	6	6
2	Toru Yano	Win	6	6
2	Tomohiro Ishii	Win	4	6
3	Yujiro Takahashi	Loss	4	4
3	Tanga Loa	Win	2	4
4	Tetsuya Naito	Loss	0	0

=== Night 10 (B Block) ===
The fifth night of B Block took place on October 4, 2021, at Korakuen Hall in Bunkyo, Tokyo.

No.	Results	Stipulations	Times
1	Chase Owens defeated Hiroshi Tanahashi	Singles match for the G1 Climax tournament	10:58
2	Evil defeated Tama Tonga	Singles match for the G1 Climax tournament	13:47
3	Jeff Cobb defeated Taichi	Singles match for the G1 Climax tournament	15:15
4	Hirooki Goto defeated Yoshi-Hashi	Singles match for the G1 Climax tournament	16:57
5	Kazuchika Okada defeated Sanada	Singles match for the G1 Climax tournament	29:14

==== Tournament scores ====
Rank	Wrestler	Result	Points	
Rank	Wrestler	Result	Pre	Post
1	Jeff Cobb	Win	8	10
1	Kazuchika Okada	Win	8	10
2	Evil	Win	6	8
3	Hiroshi Tanahashi	Loss	6	6
4	Sanada	Loss	4	4
4	Taichi	Loss	4	4
5	Tama Tonga	Loss	2	2
5	Hirooki Goto	Win	0	2
5	Chase Owens	Win	0	2
5	Yoshi-Hashi	Loss	2	2

=== Night 11 (A Block) ===
The sixth night of the A Block took place on October 7, 2021, at Hiroshima Sun Plaza in Nishi-ku, Hiroshima.

No.	Results	Stipulations	Times
1	El Desperado defeated Ryohei Oiwa by submission	Singles match	6:38
2	Kenta defeated Hiromu Takahashi	Singles match	19:01
3	Kota Ibushi defeated Tanga Loa	Singles match for the G1 Climax tournament	13:46
4	Zack Sabre Jr. defeated Yujiro Takahashi by submission	Singles match for the G1 Climax tournament	14:15
5	Shingo Takagi defeated Toru Yano	Singles match for the G1 Climax tournament	8:17
6	Tomohiro Ishii defeated Great-O-Khan	Singles match for the G1 Climax tournament	26:26

==== Tournament scores ====
Rank	Wrestler	Result	Points	
Rank	Wrestler	Result	Pre	Post
1	Zack Sabre Jr.	Win	8	10
1	Kota Ibushi	Win	8	10
2	Great-O-Khan	Loss	8	8
2	Kenta	Win	8	8
2	Shingo Takagi	Win	6	8
2	Tomohiro Ishii	Win	6	8
3	Toru Yano	Loss	6	6
4	Tanga Loa	Loss	4	4
4	Yujiro Takahashi	Loss	4	4
5	Tetsuya Naito	Loss	0	0

=== Night 12 (B Block) ===
The sixth night of the B Block took place on October 8, 2021, at Kochi Prefectural Gymnasium in Kochi, Kochi.

No.	Results	Stipulations	Times
1	El Desperado defeated Kosei Fujita	Singles match	8:27
2	Yoshi-Hashi defeated Tama Tonga	Singles match for the G1 Climax tournament	13:14
3	Hirooki Goto defeated Chase Owens	Singles match for the G1 Climax tournament	12:41
4	Jeff Cobb defeated Sanada	Singles match for the G1 Climax tournament	14:17
5	Evil defeated Hiroshi Tanahashi	Singles match for the G1 Climax tournament	17:22
6	Kazuchika Okada defeated Taichi	Singles match for the G1 Climax tournament	23:10

==== Tournament scores ====
Rank	Wrestler	Result	Points	
Rank	Wrestler	Result	Pre	Post
1	Jeff Cobb	Win	10	12
1	Kazuchika Okada	Win	10	12
2	Evil	Win	8	10
3	Hiroshi Tanahashi	Loss	6	6
4	Sanada	Loss	4	4
4	Taichi	Loss	4	4
4	Hirooki Goto	Win	2	4
4	Yoshi-Hashi	Win	2	4
5	Tama Tonga	Loss	2	2
5	Chase Owens	Loss	2	2

=== Night 13 (A Block) ===
The seventh night of A Block took place on October 9, 2021, at Osaka Prefectural Gymnasium in Namba, Osaka.

No.	Results	Stipulations	Times
1	Suzuki-gun (El Desperado and Yoshinobu Kanemaru) defeated Kosei Fujita and Ryohei Oiwa	Tag Team match	9:31
2	Tomohiro Ishii defeated Hiromu Takahashi	Singles match	18:13
3	Kenta defeated Zack Sabre Jr.	Singles match for the G1 Climax tournament	22:24
4	Toru Yano defeated Yujiro Takahashi by Count Out	Singles match for the G1 Climax tournament	10:23
5	Shingo Takagi defeated Tanga Loa	Singles match for the G1 Climax tournament	19:08
6	Kota Ibushi defeated Great-O-Khan	Singles match for the G1 Climax tournament	20:22

==== Tournament scores ====
Rank	Wrestler	Result	Points	
Rank	Wrestler	Result	Pre	Post
1	Kota Ibushi	Win	10	12
2	Zack Sabre Jr.	Loss	10	10
2	Kenta	Win	8	10
2	Shingo Takagi	Win	8	10
3	Toru Yano	Win	6	8
	Great-O-Khan	Loss	8	8
	Tomohiro Ishii	Win	8	8
4	Yujiro Takahashi	Loss	4	4
4	Tanga Loa	Loss	4	4
5	Tetsuya Naito	Loss	0	0

=== Night 14 (B Block) ===
The seventh night of B Block took place on October 12, 2021, at Xebio Arena Sendai in Sendai, Miyagi.

No.	Results	Stipulations	Times
1	Hiromu Takahashi defeated Ryohei Oiwa	Singles match	7:16
2	Tama Tonga defeated Taichi	Singles match for the G1 Climax tournament	12:58
3	Sanada defeated Yoshi-Hashi	Singles match for the G1 Climax tournament	17:35
4	Kazuchika Okada defeated Chase Owens	Singles match for the G1 Climax tournament	15:37
5	Evil defeated Hirooki Goto	Singles match for the G1 Climax tournament	14:16
6	Jeff Cobb defeated Hiroshi Tanahashi	Singles match for the G1 Climax tournament	19:05

==== Tournament scores ====
Rank	Wrestler	Result	Points	
Rank	Wrestler	Result	Pre	Post
1	Jeff Cobb	Win	12	14
1	Kazuchika Okada	Win	12	14
2	Evil	Win	10	12
3	Hiroshi Tanahashi	Loss	6	6
3	Sanada	Win	4	6
4	Taichi	Loss	4	4
4	Hirooki Goto	Loss	4	4
4	Yoshi-Hashi	Loss	4	4
4	Tama Tonga	Win	2	4
5	Chase Owens	Loss	2	2

=== Night 15 (A Block) ===
The eighth night of A Block took place on October 13, 2021, at Xebio Arena Sendai in Sendai, Miyagi.

No.	Results	Stipulations	Times
1	Hiromu Takahashi defeated Kosei Fujita	Singles match	7:46
2	Kota Ibushi defeated Satoshi Kojima	Singles match	14:56
3	Tomohiro Ishii defeated Yujiro Takahashi	Singles match for the G1 Climax tournament	17:00
4	Kenta defeated Tanga Loa	Singles match for the G1 Climax tournament	22:12
5	Zack Sabre Jr. defeated Toru Yano by submission	Singles match for the G1 Climax tournament	6:42
6	Shingo Takagi defeated Great-O-Khan	Singles match for the G1 Climax tournament	25:50

==== Tournament scores ====
Rank	Wrestler	Result	Points	
Rank	Wrestler	Result	Pre	Post
1	Kota Ibushi	Win	12	12
1	Zack Sabre Jr.	Win	10	12
1	Kenta	Win	10	12
1	Shingo Takagi	Win	10	12
2	Tomohiro Ishii	Win	8	10
3	Toru Yano	Loss	8	8
3	Great-O-Khan	Loss	8	8
4	Yujiro Takahashi	Loss	4	4
4	Tanga Loa	Loss	4	4
5	Tetsuya Naito	Loss	0	0

=== Night 16 (B Block) ===
The eighth night of B Block took place on October 14, 2021, at Yamagata City General Sports Center in Tendo, Yamagata.

No.	Results	Stipulations	Times
1	Los Ingobernables de Japón (Bushi and Hiromu Takahashi) defeated Kosei Fujita and Ryohei Oiwa	Tag Team match	7:12
2	Chase Owens defeated Taichi	Singles match for the G1 Climax tournament	12:05
3	Sanada defeated Hirooki Goto	Singles match for the G1 Climax tournament	15:32
4	Hiroshi Tanahashi defeated Yoshi-Hashi	Singles match for the G1 Climax tournament	14:13
5	Jeff Cobb defeated Evil	Singles match for the G1 Climax tournament	16:45
6	Tama Tonga defeated Kazuchika Okada	Singles match for the G1 Climax tournament	24:45

==== Tournament scores ====
Rank	Wrestler	Result	Points	
Rank	Wrestler	Result	Pre	Post
1	Jeff Cobb	Win	14	16
2	Kazuchika Okada	Loss	14	14
3	Evil	Loss	12	12
4	Hiroshi Tanahashi	Win	6	8
4	Sanada	Win	6	8
5	Tama Tonga	Win	4	6
6	Taichi	Loss	4	4
6	Hirooki Goto	Loss	4	4
6	Yoshi-Hashi	Loss	4	4
6	Chase Owens	Win	2	4

=== Night 17 (A Block Final) ===
The ninth night of A Block took place on October 18, 2021, at Yokohama Budokan in Naka-ku, Yokohama.

No.	Results	Stipulations	Times
1	Great-O-Khan defeated Satoshi Kojima	Singles match	10:25
2	Toru Yano defeated Tomohiro Ishii	Singles match for the G1 Climax tournament	11:08
3	Shingo Takagi vs. Yujiro Takahashi ended in double count-out (Note: Takagi vs. Takahashi is the first double count-out in a G1 Climax match since Masato Tanaka vs. Giant Bernard in 2009.)	Singles match for the G1 Climax tournament	13:36
4	Tanga Loa defeated Zack Sabre Jr.	Singles match for the G1 Climax tournament	17:31
5	Kota Ibushi defeated Kenta	Singles match for the G1 Climax tournament	26:16

==== Tournament scores ====
Colors
	Won the block			
	Did not win the block			
Rank	Wrestler	Result	Points	
Rank	Wrestler	Result	Pre	Post
1	Kota Ibushi	Win	12	14
2	Shingo Takagi	Draw	12	13
3	Kenta	Loss	12	12
3	Zack Sabre Jr.	Loss	12	12
4	Toru Yano	Win	8	10
4	Tomohiro Ishii	Loss	10	10
5	Great-O-Khan	Win	8	8
6	Tanga Loa	Win	4	6
7	Yujiro Takahashi	Draw	4	5
8	Tetsuya Naito	Loss	0	0

=== Night 18 (B Block Final) ===
The ninth night of B Block took place on October 20, 2021, at Nippon Budokan in Chiyoda-ku, Tokyo.

No.	Results	Stipulations	Times
1	Los Ingobernables de Japón (Bushi and Hiromu Takahashi) defeated Kosei Fujita and Ryohei Oiwa	Tag Team match	8:07
2	Yoshi-Hashi defeated Chase Owens	Singles match for the G1 Climax tournament	8:27
3	Hirooki Goto defeated Tama Tonga	Singles match for the G1 Climax tournament	15:19
4	Taichi defeated Hiroshi Tanahashi	Singles match for the G1 Climax tournament	14:58
5	Evil defeated Sanada	Singles match for the G1 Climax tournament	17:47
6	Kazuchika Okada defeated Jeff Cobb	Singles match for the G1 Climax tournament	23:35

==== Tournament scores ====
Colors
	Won the block			
	Did not win the block			
Rank	Wrestler	Result	Points	
Rank	Wrestler	Result	Pre	Post
1	Kazuchika Okada	Win	14	16
	Jeff Cobb	Loss	16	16
2	Evil	Win	12	14
3	Hiroshi Tanahashi	Loss	8	8
3	Sanada	Loss	8	8
4	Hirooki Goto	Win	4	6
4	Yoshi-Hashi	Win	4	6
4	Tama Tonga	Loss	6	6
4	Taichi	Win	4	6
5	Chase Owens	Loss	4	4

=== Night 19 (Final) ===
The final night took place on October 21, 2021, at Nippon Budokan in Chiyoda-ku, Tokyo.

No.	Results	Stipulations	Times
1	Suzuki-gun (Yoshinobu Kanemaru and El Desperado) defeated Kosei Fujita and Ryohei Oiwa by submission	Tag team match	8:40
2	Yuji Nagata and Toru Yano defeated United Empire (Great-O-Khan and Jeff Cobb)	Tag team match	8:29
3	House of Torture (Sho, Yujiro Takahashi and Evil) defeated Chaos (Yoshi-Hashi, Tomohiro Ishii and Hirooki Goto)	Six-man tag team match	11:20
4	Bullet Club (Chase Owens, Tanga Loa, Tama Tonga and Kenta) defeated Tiger Mask, Hiroshi Tanahashi and Great Bash Heel (Tomoaki Honma and Togi Makabe)	Eight-man tag team match	10:41
5	Katsuyori Shibata vs. Zack Sabre Jr. ended in a time limit draw	Singles match This was a 5-minute exhibition match under UWF rules.	5:00
6	Los Ingobernables de Japon (Bushi, Hiromu Takahashi, Sanada and Shingo Takagi) defeated Master Wato, Ryusuke Taguchi and Tencozy (Satoshi Kojima and Hiroyoshi Tenzan)	Eight-man tag team match	12:17
7	Kazuchika Okada defeated Kota Ibushi by referee stoppage	Singles match for the G1 Climax tournament final	25:37

== Participants ==
On Night 1 of A Block competition, Tetsuya Naito suffered a legitimate knee injury in his match with Zack Sabre Jr., resulting in Naito having to withdraw from the tournament. All his remaining tournament matches were declared forfeits on Naito's part.

Final standings
A Block		B Block	
Kota Ibushi	14	Kazuchika Okada	16
Shingo Takagi	13	Jeff Cobb	16
Kenta	12	Evil	14
Zack Sabre Jr.	12	Hiroshi Tanahashi	8
Toru Yano	10	Sanada	8
Tomohiro Ishii	10	Hirooki Goto	6
Great-O-Khan	8	Yoshi-Hashi	6
Tanga Loa	6	Tama Tonga	6
Yujiro Takahashi	5	Taichi	6
Tetsuya Naito (withdrawn)	0	Chase Owens	4

Tournament overview
Block A	O-Khan	Ibushi	Ishii	Kenta	Loa	Naito	Sabre	Takagi	Takahashi	Yano
O-Khan	—N/a	Ibushi (20:22)	Ishii (26:26)	Kenta (19:39)	O-Khan (17:45)	O-Khan (Forfeit)	Sabre (15:26)	Takagi (25:50)	O-Khan (14:15)	O-Khan (11:30)
Ibushi	Ibushi (20:22)	—N/a	Ibushi (17:42)	Ibushi (26:16)	Ibushi (13:46)	Ibushi (Forfeit)	Sabre (19:55)	Ibushi (23:57)	Takahashi (11:31)	Ibushi (4:03)
Ishii	Ishii (26:26)	Ibushi (17:42)	—N/a	Kenta (21:08)	Ishii (16:18)	Ishii (Forfeit)	Ishii (18:40)	Takagi (27:56)	Ishii (17:00)	Yano (11:08)
Kenta	Kenta (19:39)	Ibushi (26:16)	Kenta (21:08)	—N/a	Kenta (22:12)	Kenta (Forfeit)	Kenta (22:24)	Takagi (23:56)	Kenta (15:48)	Yano (11:07)
Loa	O-Khan (17:45)	Ibushi (13:46)	Ishii (16:18)	Kenta (22:12)	—N/a	Loa (Forfeit)	Loa (17:31)	Takagi (19:08)	Loa (12:36)	Yano (10:46)
Naito	O-Khan (Forfeit)	Ibushi (Forfeit)	Ishii (Forfeit)	Kenta (Forfeit)	Loa (Forfeit)	—N/a	Sabre (27:05)	Takagi (Forfeit)	Takahashi (Forfeit)	Yano (Forfeit)
Sabre	Sabre (15:26)	Sabre (19:55)	Ishii (18:40)	Kenta (22:24)	Loa (17:31)	Sabre (27:05)	—N/a	Sabre (27:17)	Sabre (14:15)	Sabre (6:42)
Takagi	Takagi (25:50)	Ibushi (23:57)	Takagi (27:56)	Takagi (23:56)	Takagi (19:08)	Takagi (Forfeit)	Sabre (27:17)	—N/a	Draw (13:36)	Takagi (8:17)
Takahashi	O-Khan (14:15)	Takahashi (11:31)	Ishii (17:00)	Kenta (15:48)	Loa (12:36)	Takahashi (Forfeit)	Sabre (14:15)	Draw (13:36)	—N/a	Yano (10:23)
Yano	O-Khan (11:30)	Ibushi (4:03)	Yano (11:08)	Yano (11:07)	Yano (10:46)	Yano (Forfeit)	Sabre (6:42)	Takagi (8:17)	Yano (10:23)	—N/a
Block B	Cobb	Evil	Goto	Okada	Owens	Sanada	Taichi	Tanahashi	Tonga	Yoshi-Hashi
Cobb	—N/a	Cobb (16:45)	Cobb (15:08)	Okada (23:35)	Cobb (12:11)	Cobb (14:17)	Cobb (15:15)	Cobb (19:05)	Cobb (12:35)	Cobb (13:21)
Evil	Cobb (16:45)	—N/a	Evil (14:16)	Okada (21:46)	Evil (12:28)	Evil (17:47)	Evil (11:30)	Evil (17:22)	Evil (13:47)	Evil (17:15)
Goto	Cobb (15:08)	Evil (14:16)	—N/a	Okada (18:06)	Goto (12:41)	Sanada (15:32)	Taichi (18:30)	Tanahashi (14:10)	Goto (15:19)	Goto (16:57)
Okada	Okada (23:35)	Okada (21:46)	Okada (18:06)	—N/a	Okada (15:37)	Okada (29:14)	Okada (23:10)	Okada (29:36)	Tonga (24:45)	Okada (26:53)
Owens	Cobb (12:11)	Evil (12:28)	Goto (12:41)	Okada (15:37)	—N/a	Sanada (11:58)	Owens (12:05)	Owens (10:58)	Tonga (12:59)	Yoshi-Hashi (8:27)
Sanada	Cobb (14:17)	Evil (17:47)	Sanada (15:32)	Okada (29:14)	Sanada (11:58)	—N/a	Taichi (25:15)	Tanahashi (18:06)	Sanada (19:04)	Sanada (17:35)
Taichi	Cobb (15:15)	Evil (11:30)	Taichi (18:30)	Okada (23:10)	Owens (12:05)	Taichi (25:15)	—N/a	Taichi (14:58)	Tonga (12:58)	Yoshi-Hashi (22:23)
Tanahashi	Cobb (19:05)	Evil (17:22)	Tanahashi (14:10)	Okada (29:36)	Owens (10:58)	Tanahashi (18:06)	Taichi (14:58)	—N/a	Tanahashi (14:07)	Tanahashi (14:13)
Tonga	Cobb (12:35)	Evil (13:47)	Goto (15:19)	Tonga (24:45)	Tonga (12:59)	Sanada (19:04)	Tonga (12:58)	Tanahashi (14:07)	—N/a	Yoshi-Hashi (13:14)
Yoshi-Hashi	Cobb (13:21)	Evil (17:15)	Goto (16:57)	Okada (26:53)	Yoshi-Hashi (8:27)	Sanada (17:35)	Yoshi-Hashi (22:26)	Tanahashi (14:13)	Yoshi-Hashi (13:14)	—N/a

Final
A1	Kota Ibushi	25:37
B1	Kazuchika Okada	Stop

== Aftermath ==
On the final night of G1 Climax 31, Zack Sabre Jr. had an impromptu 5-minute, special exhibition grappling match with Katsuyori Shibata, marking Shibata's return to in-ring action since suffering a subdural hematoma at Sakura Genesis 2017, which put him out of action for over 4 years. The bout went to the time limit and no winner was declared. Afterwards, Shibata addressed the crowd, saying the next time he will step back into the ring, it will be in his ring gear, presumably in a sanctioned wrestling match. During the finals for World Tag League and Best of Super Juniors 28, Shibata would address the crowd, announcing his first official match since Sakura Genesis would take place on January 4, 2022, at Wrestle Kingdom 16.

In a press conference after winning the tournament, Okada proposed to NJPW chairman Naoki Sugabayashi to hold and defend the previous version of the IWGP Heavyweight Championship belt, seen from 2008–2021, instead of the usual briefcase which holds the Tokyo Dome IWGP World Heavyweight Championship challenge rights certificate. Sugabayashi accepted the proposal, and the former title belt returned to represent Okada's G1 win on the first show of the Road to Power Struggle tour. Okada would go on to beat Shingo Takagi on January 4 at Wrestle Kingdom 16, where he finally retired the 4th Generation title belt on his terms in the Tokyo Dome at the end of the night.
