= G1 Climax 33 =

2023 edition of the G1 Climax

- Promotional poster featuring all the competitors of the tournament
- Promotion: New Japan Pro-Wrestling
- Date: July 15 – August 13, 2023
- City: See venues
- Venue: See venues
- Tagline: Born in the Ring

Event chronology
← Previous; Independence Day	Next → All Star Junior Festival USA 2023

G1 Climax chronology
← Previous; G1 Climax 32	Next → G1 Climax 34

G1 Climax 33
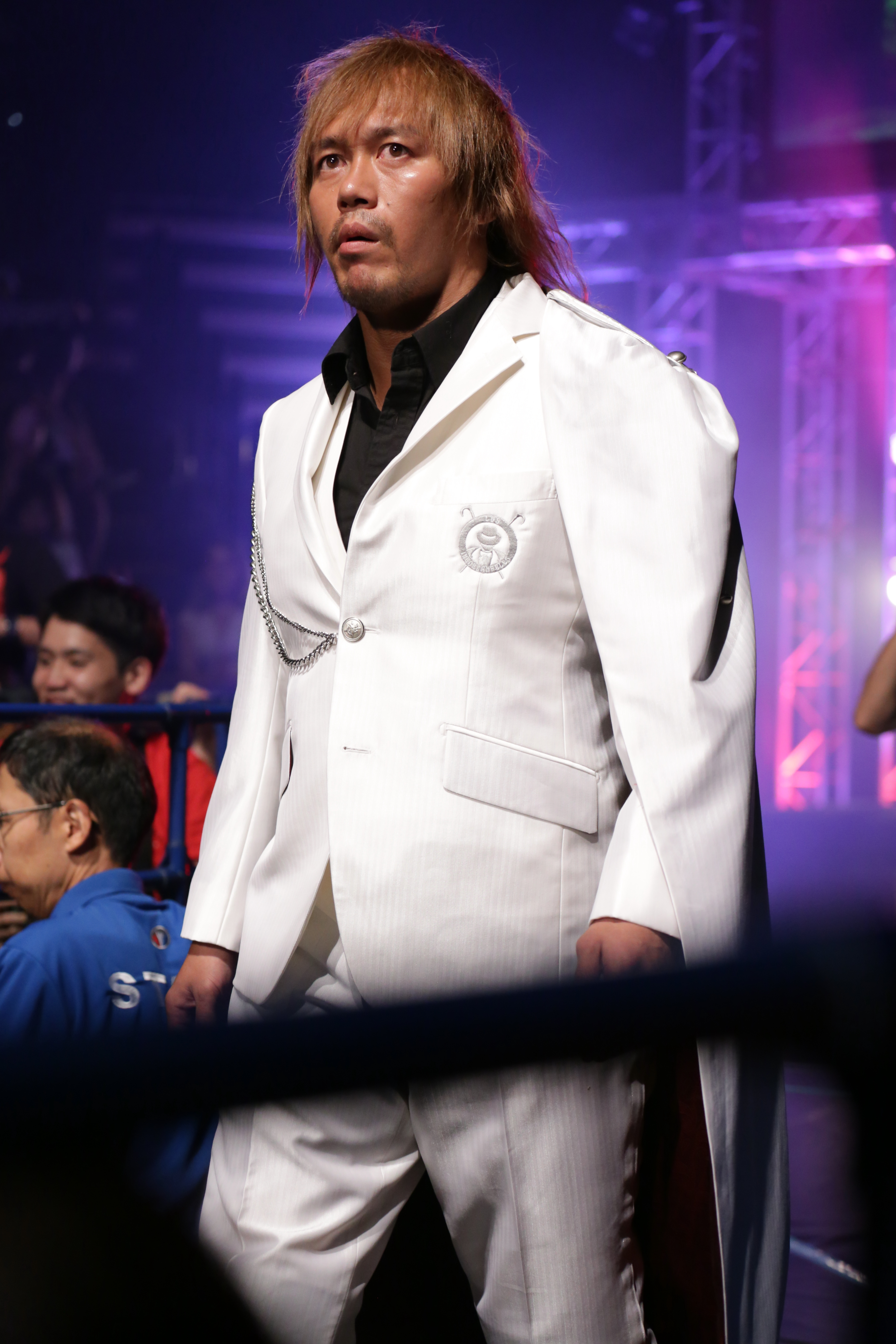
- Tetsuya Naito, winner of G1 Climax 33

Tournament information
- Sport: Professional wrestling
- Location: Japan
- Dates: July 15, 2023–August 13, 2023
- Tournament format: Four-block round-robin tournament
- Participants: 32

Final positions
- Champion: Tetsuya Naito
- Runner-up: Kazuchika Okada

Tournament statistics
- Bouts fought: 119

The G1 Climax 33 was a professional wrestling tournament promoted by New Japan Pro-Wrestling (NJPW). The tournament commenced on July 15 and concluded on August 13, 2023. It is the thirty-third edition of G1 Climax and the forty-ninth edition of the tournament counting its previous forms under different names.

Considered NJPW's most important tournament, the G1 Climax featured 32 wrestlers, divided into four blocks of eight ("A", "B", "C", and "D"). Each participant faced all seven other wrestlers within the same block in singles matches. The winner of each block was determined via a point system, with two points for a win, one point for a draw, and no points for a defeat. There was a 20-minute time limit for the block matches instead the usual 30-minute time limit. Each night of the event seen matches from two blocks per night. On the final three days of the event, the top two scoring wrestlers of each block entered an eight-man playoff to determine the winner of the tournament, who also receives a future match for the IWGP World Heavyweight Championship at Wrestle Kingdom.

It was the largest G1 Climax to date with 32 participants and like last year's G1, it returned to the four-block format.

The event saw the G1 Climax debuts of Shota Umino, Hikuleo, Eddie Kingston, Ren Narita, Gabriel Kidd, Alex Coughlin, Shane Haste, Mikey Nicholls, Yota Tsuji and Kaito Kiyomiya with Kingston and Kiyomiya being outsiders from All Elite Wrestling and Pro Wrestling Noah respectively.

== Production ==
=== Tournament rules ===
The tournament features 32 wrestlers, divided into four blocks of eight ("A", "B", "C", and "D"). Each participant faces all seven other wrestlers within the same block in singles matches. The winner of each block is determined via a point system, with two points for a win, one point for a draw, and no points for a loss; each night of the event sees one match from each block between two members competing for the tournament. In case of several wrestlers sharing the top score, the results of the matches those wrestlers had when facing each other in the tournament act as tiebreaker, with the one having the most wins over the other top-scorers determining the winner of the block.

On the final three days of the event, the top two scoring wrestlers of each block enter an eight-man single-elimination playoff to determine the winner of the G1 Climax, who would gain a future match for the IWGP World Heavyweight Championship, NJPW's top championship, at Wrestle Kingdom, NJPW's biggest yearly event; if the IWGP Heavyweight Champion himself wins, he selects his opponent at Wrestle Kingdom. The matches of the tournament have a 20-minutes time limit (with the time limit being reached resulting in a tie); the semifinal (block winners) and final (semifinal winners) matches, where a winner must be determined, have no time limit.

=== History ===
On April 8, 2023, at Sakura Genesis, NJPW announced that the 2023 edition of the G1 Climax would take place from July to August. During Dominion 6.4 in Osaka-jo Hall on June 4, NJPW announced the participants for the G1 Climax.

=== Storylines ===
The event includes matches that result from scripted storylines, where wrestlers portray heroes, villains, or less distinguishable characters in scripted events that build tension and culminate in a wrestling match or series of matches.

=== Venues ===
Dates	Venue	Location
July 15	Hokkai Kitayell	Toyohira-ku, Sapporo
July 16	Hokkai Kitayell	Toyohira-ku, Sapporo
July 18	Yamagata City General Sports Center	Tendo, Yamagata
July 19	Xebio Arena Sendai	Sendai, Miyagi
July 21	City Hall Plaza Aore Nagaoka	Nagaoka, Niigata
July 23	Big Hat	Nagano, Nagano
July 25	Korakuen Hall	Bunkyo, Tokyo
July 26	Korakuen Hall	Bunkyo, Tokyo
July 27	Ota City General Gymnasium	Ōta, Tokyo
July 30	Aichi Prefectural Gymnasium	Nagoya, Aichi
August 1	Takamatsu City General Gymnasium	Takamatsu, Kagawa
August 2	Hiroshima Sun Plaza	Nishi-ku, Hiroshima
August 5	Osaka Prefectural Gymnasium	Namba, Osaka
August 6	Osaka Prefectural Gymnasium	Namba, Osaka
August 8	Yokohama Budokan	Naka-ku, Yokohama
August 9	Act City Hamamatsu	Naka-ku, Hamamatsu
August 10	Funabashi Arena	Funabashi, Chiba
August 12	Ryōgoku Kokugikan	Sumida, Tokyo
August 13	Ryōgoku Kokugikan	Sumida, Tokyo

== Results ==
=== Night 1 ===
The first night of the tournament took place on July 15, 2023, at Hokkai Kitayell in Toyohira-ku, Sapporo.

No.	Results	Stipulations	Times
1	Yoshi-Hashi defeated El Phantasmo by pinfall	B Block singles match in the G1 Climax tournament	10:56
2	Chase Owens defeated Gabe Kidd by pinfall	A Block singles match in the G1 Climax tournament	2:55
3	Tanga Loa defeated Kenta by pinfall	B Block singles match in the G1 Climax tournament	12:46
4	Shota Umino vs. Ren Narita ended in a time-limit draw	A Block singles match in the G1 Climax tournament	20:00
5	Kazuchika Okada defeated Great-O-Khan by pinfall	B Block singles match in the G1 Climax tournament	15:23
6	Kaito Kiyomiya defeated Yota Tsuji by pinfall	A Block singles match in the G1 Climax tournament	14:48
7	Taichi defeated Will Ospreay by pinfall	B Block singles match in the G1 Climax tournament	17:43
8	Sanada defeated Hikuleo by pinfall	A Block singles match in the G1 Climax tournament	10:16

=== Night 2 ===
The second night of the tournament took place on July 16, 2023, at Hokkai Kitayell in Toyohira-ku, Sapporo.

No.	Results	Stipulations	Times
1	David Finlay defeated Tomohiro Ishii by pinfall	C Block singles match in the G1 Climax tournament	15:55
2	Hirooki Goto defeated Toru Yano by pinfall	D Block singles match in the G1 Climax tournament	6:44
3	Mikey Nicholls defeated Henare by pinfall	C Block singles match in the G1 Climax tournament	12:21
4	Shane Haste defeated Alex Coughlin by pinfall	D Block singles match in the G1 Climax tournament	10:55
5	Eddie Kingston defeated Shingo Takagi by pinfall	C Block singles match in the G1 Climax tournament	12:50
6	Zack Sabre Jr. defeated Hiroshi Tanahashi by pinfall	D Block singles match in the G1 Climax tournament	16:09
7	Evil defeated Tama Tonga by pinfall	C Block singles match in the G1 Climax tournament	17:34
8	Jeff Cobb defeated Tetsuya Naito by pinfall	D Block singles match in the G1 Climax tournament	14:20

=== Night 3 ===
The third night of the tournament took place on July 18, 2023, at Yamagata City General Sports Center in Toyohira-ku, Yamagata.

No.	Results	Stipulations	Times
1	Kaito Kiyomiya defeated Chase Owens by pinfall	A Block singles match in the G1 Climax tournament	8:28
2	Kenta defeated Great-O-Khan by pinfall	B Block singles match in the G1 Climax tournament	11:40
3	Gabe Kidd defeated Hikuleo by pinfall	A Block singles match in the G1 Climax tournament	3:21
4	Taichi defeated Tanga Loa by pinfall	B Block singles match in the G1 Climax tournament	12:34
5	Ren Narita vs. Yota Tsuji ended in a time-limit draw	A Block singles match in the G1 Climax tournament	20:00
6	Will Ospreay defeated Yoshi-Hashi by pinfall	B Block singles match in the G1 Climax tournament	13:04
7	Sanada defeated Shota Umino by pinfall	A Block singles match in the G1 Climax tournament	18:48
8	Kazuchika Okada defeated El Phantasmo by pinfall	B Block singles match in the G1 Climax tournament	16:21

=== Night 4 ===
The fourth night of the tournament took place on July 19, 2023, at Xebio Arena Sendai in Sendai, Miyagi.

No.	Results	Stipulations	Times
1	Zack Sabre Jr. defeated Toru Yano by pinfall	D Block singles match in the G1 Climax tournament	5:37
2	David Finlay defeated Mikey Nicholls by pinfall	C Block singles match in the G1 Climax tournament	9:52
3	Jeff Cobb defeated Alex Coughlin by pinfall	D Block singles match in the G1 Climax tournament	9:51
4	Evil defeated Eddie Kingston by pinfall	C Block singles match in the G1 Climax tournament	15:15
5	Hiroshi Tanahashi defeated Shane Haste by pinfall	D Block singles match in the G1 Climax tournament	12:04
6	Henare defeated Shingo Takagi by pinfall	C Block singles match in the G1 Climax tournament	19:38
7	Tetsuya Naito defeated Hirooki Goto by pinfall	D Block singles match in the G1 Climax tournament	17:40
8	Tama Tonga defeated Tomohiro Ishii by pinfall	C Block singles match in the G1 Climax tournament	15:38

=== Night 5 ===
The fifth night of the tournament took place on July 21, 2023, at City Hall Plaza Aore Nagaoka in Nagaoka, Niigata.

No.	Results	Stipulations	Times
1	Yoshi-Hashi defeated Tanga Loa by pinfall	B Block singles match in the G1 Climax tournament	12:35
2	Gabe Kidd defeated Ren Narita by pinfall	A Block singles match in the G1 Climax tournament	10:05
3	Great-O-Khan defeated El Phantasmo by submission	B Block singles match in the G1 Climax tournament	12:46
4	Chase Owens defeated Hikuleo by pinfall	A Block singles match in the G1 Climax tournament	11:20
5	Will Ospreay defeated Kenta by pinfall	B Block singles match in the G1 Climax tournament	14:02
6	Kaito Kiyomiya vs. Shota Umino ended in a time-limit draw	A Block singles match in the G1 Climax tournament	20:00
7	Kazuchika Okada defeated Taichi by pinfall	B Block singles match in the G1 Climax tournament	16:20
8	Sanada defeated Yota Tsuji by pinfall	A Block singles match in the G1 Climax tournament	18:36

=== Night 6 ===
The sixth night of the tournament took place on July 23, 2023, at Big Hat in Nagano, Nagano.

No.	Results	Stipulations	Times
1	Zack Sabre Jr. defeated Alex Coughlin by submission	D Block singles match in the G1 Climax tournament	11:13
2	Tama Tonga defeated Mikey Nicholls by pinfall	C Block singles match in the G1 Climax tournament	9:10
3	Hirooki Goto defeated Shane Haste by pinfall	D Block singles match in the G1 Climax tournament	2:29
4	Eddie Kingston defeated Henare by pinfall	C Block singles match in the G1 Climax tournament	10:32
5	Tetsuya Naito defeated Toru Yano by pinfall	D Block singles match in the G1 Climax tournament	7:24
6	Shingo Takagi defeated Tomohiro Ishii by pinfall	C Block singles match in the G1 Climax tournament	18:10
7	Jeff Cobb defeated Hiroshi Tanahashi by pinfall	D Block singles match in the G1 Climax tournament	10:30
8	David Finlay defeated Evil by pinfall	C Block singles match in the G1 Climax tournament	16:12

=== Night 7 ===
The seventh night of the tournament took place on July 25, 2023, at Korakuen Hall in Bunkyo, Tokyo.

No.	Results	Stipulations	Times
1	Will Ospreay defeated Great-O-Khan by pinfall	B Block singles match in the G1 Climax tournament	11:20
2	Shota Umino defeated Gabe Kidd by pinfall	A Block singles match in the G1 Climax tournament	13:03
3	Kenta defeated Taichi by pinfall	B Block singles match in the G1 Climax tournament	2:11
4	Yota Tsuji defeated Chase Owens by pinfall	A Block singles match in the G1 Climax tournament	11:42
5	El Phantasmo defeated Tanga Loa by pinfall	B Block singles match in the G1 Climax tournament	12:14
6	Hikuleo defeated Ren Narita by pinfall	A Block singles match in the G1 Climax tournament	11:58
7	Kazuchika Okada defeated Yoshi-Hashi by pinfall	B Block singles match in the G1 Climax tournament	16:32
8	Sanada defeated Kaito Kiyomiya by pinfall	A Block singles match in the G1 Climax tournament	19:58

=== Night 8 ===
The eighth night of the tournament took place on July 26, 2023, at Korakuen Hall in Bunkyo, Tokyo.

No.	Results	Stipulations	Times
1	Evil defeated Henare by pinfall	C Block singles match in the G1 Climax tournament	12:03
2	Alex Coughlin defeated Hirooki Goto by pinfall	D Block singles match in the G1 Climax tournament	6:23
3	Shingo Takagi defeated Mikey Nicholls by pinfall	C Block singles match in the G1 Climax tournament	9:13
4	Hiroshi Tanahashi defeated Toru Yano by pinfall	D Block singles match in the G1 Climax tournament	7:45
5	Tomohiro Ishii defeated Eddie Kingston by pinfall	C Block singles match in the G1 Climax tournament	16:12
6	Shane Haste defeated Tetsuya Naito by pinfall	D Block singles match in the G1 Climax tournament	13:44
7	Tama Tonga defeated David Finlay by pinfall	C Block singles match in the G1 Climax tournament	14:22
8	Jeff Cobb defeated Zack Sabre Jr. by pinfall	D Block singles match in the G1 Climax tournament	16:16

=== Night 9 ===
The ninth night of the tournament took place on July 27, 2023, at Ota City General Gymnasium in Ōta, Tokyo.

No.	Results	Stipulations	Times
1	Shota Umino defeated Chase Owens by pinfall	A Block singles match in the G1 Climax tournament	9:35
2	Taichi defeated Yoshi-Hashi by pinfall	B Block singles match in the G1 Climax tournament	13:13
3	Kaito Kiyomiya vs. Gabe Kidd ended in a double countout	A Block singles match in the G1 Climax tournament	11:44
4	Tanga Loa defeated Great-O-Khan by pinfall	B Block singles match in the G1 Climax tournament	12:41
5	Hikuleo defeated Yota Tsuji by pinfall	A Block singles match in the G1 Climax tournament	12:12
6	El Phantasmo defeated Kenta by pinfall	B Block singles match in the G1 Climax tournament	0:19
7	Sanada defeated Ren Narita by pinfall	A Block singles match in the G1 Climax tournament	16:30
8	Will Ospreay defeated Kazuchika Okada by pinfall	B Block singles match in the G1 Climax tournament	17:21

=== Night 10 ===
The tenth night of the tournament took place on July 30, 2023, at Aichi Prefectural Gymnasium in Nagoya, Aichi.

No.	Results	Stipulations	Times
1	David Finlay defeated Henare by pinfall	C Block singles match in the G1 Climax tournament	11:54
2	Toru Yano defeated Jeff Cobb by pinfall	D Block singles match in the G1 Climax tournament	1:49
3	Eddie Kingston defeated Mikey Nicholls by pinfall	C Block singles match in the G1 Climax tournament	8:33
4	Tetsuya Naito defeated Alex Coughlin by pinfall	D Block singles match in the G1 Climax tournament	10:07
5	Evil defeated Tomohiro Ishii by pinfall	C Block singles match in the G1 Climax tournament	14:36
6	Zack Sabre Jr. defeated Shane Haste by pinfall	D Block singles match in the G1 Climax tournament	13:23
7	Tama Tonga vs. Shingo Takagi ended in a time-limit draw	C Block singles match in the G1 Climax tournament	20:00
8	Hiroshi Tanahashi defeated Hirooki Goto by pinfall	D Block singles match in the G1 Climax tournament	14:40

=== Night 11 ===
The eleventh night of the tournament took place on August 1, 2023, at Takamatsu City General Gymnasium in Takamatsu, Kagawa.

No.	Results	Stipulations	Times
1	Hikuleo defeated Kaito Kiyomiya by pinfall	A Block singles match in the G1 Climax tournament	9:46
2	Great-O-Khan defeated Yoshi-Hashi by pinfall	B Block singles match in the G1 Climax tournament	13:50
3	Ren Narita defeated Chase Owens by submission	A Block singles match in the G1 Climax tournament	9:08
4	El Phantasmo defeated Taichi by pinfall	B Block singles match in the G1 Climax tournament	13:56
5	Sanada defeated Gabe Kidd by pinfall	A Block singles match in the G1 Climax tournament	12:08
6	Tanga Loa defeated Will Ospreay by countout	B Block singles match in the G1 Climax tournament	15:34
7	Yota Tsuji defeated Shota Umino by pinfall	A Block singles match in the G1 Climax tournament	19:20
8	Kazuchika Okada defeated Kenta by pinfall	B Block singles match in the G1 Climax tournament	19:10

=== Night 12 ===
The twelfth night of the tournament took place on August 2, 2023, at Hiroshima Sun Plaza in Nishi-ku, Hiroshima.

No.	Results	Stipulations	Times
1	Alex Coughlin defeated Hiroshi Tanahashi by pinfall	D Block singles match in the G1 Climax tournament	8:50
2	Mikey Nicholls defeated Evil by pinfall	C Block singles match in the G1 Climax tournament	9:40
3	Toru Yano defeated Shane Haste by pinfall	D Block singles match in the G1 Climax tournament	6:09
4	Henare defeated Tomohiro Ishii by pinfall	C Block singles match in the G1 Climax tournament	14:21
5	Hirooki Goto defeated Jeff Cobb by pinfall	D Block singles match in the G1 Climax tournament	11:33
6	Eddie Kingston defeated Tama Tonga by pinfall	C Block singles match in the G1 Climax tournament	11:39
7	Tetsuya Naito defeated Zack Sabre Jr. by pinfall	D Block singles match in the G1 Climax tournament	18:30
8	Shingo Takagi defeated David Finlay by pinfall	C Block singles match in the G1 Climax tournament	18:45

=== Night 13 ===
The thirteenth night of the tournament took place on August 5, 2023, at Hiroshima Sun Plaza in Nishi-ku, Hiroshima.

No.	Results	Stipulations	Times
1	United Empire (Great-O-Khan and Jeff Cobb) defeated Just 5 Guys (Douki and Taichi) by submission	Tag team match	6:55
2	Chaos (Yoh, Yoshi-Hashi, and Hirooki Goto) defeated Bullet Club (Gedo, Kenta, and David Finlay) by pinfall	Six-man tag team match	11:14
3	House of Torture (Sho, Yujiro Takahashi, and Evil) defeated Los Ingobernables de Japon (Bushi, Shingo Takagi, and Tetsuya Naito) by pinfall	Six-man tag team match	8:51
4	United Empire (Henare and Will Ospreay) defeated Togi Makabe and El Phantasmo by pinfall	Tag team match	8:05
5	Chaos (Tomohiro Ishii and Kazuchika Okada) and Hiroshi Tanahashi defeated Guerrillas of Destiny (Tanga Loa and Tama Tonga) and Hiroyoshi Tenzan by pinfall	Six-man tag team match	12:11
6	Yota Tsuji defeated Gabe Kidd by pinfall	A Block singles match in the G1 Climax tournament	14:47
7	Ren Narita defeated Kaito Kiyomiya by pinfall	A Block singles match in the G1 Climax tournament	15:17
8	Sanada defeated Chase Owens by pinfall	A Block singles match in the G1 Climax tournament	9:13
9	Hikuleo defeated Shota Umino by pinfall	A Block singles match in the G1 Climax tournament	17:21

=== Night 14 ===
The fourteenth night of the tournament took place on August 6, 2023, at Hiroshima Sun Plaza in Nishi-ku, Hiroshima.

No.	Results	Stipulations	Times
1	Just 5 Guys (Douki and Sanada) defeated Ryohei Oiwa and Kaito Kiyomiya by pinfall	Tag team match	10:45
2	Tomohiro Ishii and Hiroshi Tanahashi defeated TMDK (Kosei Fujita and Mikey Nicholls) by pinfall	Tag team match	10:12
3	United Empire (Henare and Jeff Cobb) defeated Hiroyoshi Tenzan and Tama Tonga by pinfall	Tag team match	9:53
4	Bullet Club (Chase Owens and David Finlay) defeated Togi Makabe and Eddie Kingston by pinfall	Tag team match	10:18
5	Los Ingobernables de Japon (Bushi, Yota Tsuji, Shingo Takagi and Tetsuya Naito) defeated House of Torture (Dick Togo, Sho, Yujiro Takahashi, and Evil) by pinfall	Eight-man tag team match	9:35
6	Kenta defeated Yoshi-Hashi by pinfall	B Block singles match in the G1 Climax tournament	12:16
7	Great-O-Khan defeated Taichi by pinfall	B Block singles match in the G1 Climax tournament	17:41
8	Kazuchika Okada defeated Tanga Loa by pinfall	B Block singles match in the G1 Climax tournament	12:33
9	Will Ospreay defeated El Phantasmo by pinfall	B Block singles match in the G1 Climax tournament	18:52

=== Night 15 ===
The fifteenth night of the tournament took place on August 8, 2023, at Yokohama Budokan in Naka-ku, Yokohama.

No.	Results	Stipulations	Times
1	United Empire (Great-O-Khan and Jeff Cobb) defeated Kaito Kiyomiya and Ryohei Oiwa by pinfall	Tag team match	10:49
2	Bullet Club War Dogs (Alex Coughlin and Gabe Kidd) defeated Tomoaki Honma and Toru Yano by pinfall	Tag team match	8:22
3	Strong Style (El Desperado, Minoru Suzuki and Ren Narita) defeated Guerrillas of Destiny (Jado and Hikuleo) and Shota Umino by submission	Six man tag team match	6:43
4	TMDK (Kosei Fujita, Shane Haste, and Zack Sabre Jr.) defeated Chaos (Hirooki Goto and Yoh) and Oskar Leube by pinfall	Six man tag team match	10:18
5	Los Ingobernables de Japon (Bushi, Tetsuya Naito and Yota Tsuji) defeated Hiroshi Tanahashi, Master Wato and Togi Makabe by pinfall	Six man tag team match	10:45
6	Tomohiro Ishii defeated Mikey Nicholls by pinfall	C Block singles match in the G1 Climax tournament	13:01
7	Tama Tonga defeated Henare by pinfall	C Block singles match in the G1 Climax tournament	14:30
8	David Finlay defeated Eddie Kingston by pinfall	C Block singles match in the G1 Climax tournament	16:34
9	Evil defeated Shingo Takagi by pinfall	C Block singles match in the G1 Climax tournament	17:40

=== Night 16 ===
The sixteenth night of the tournament took place on August 9, 2023, at Act City Hamamatsu in Naka-ku, Hamamatsu.

No.	Results	Stipulations	Times
1	House of Torture (Sho and Evil) defeated Yuto Nakashima and Eddie Kingston by pinfall	Tag team match	8:31
2	TMDK (Kosei Fujita and Mikey Nicholls) defeated Ryohei Oiwa and Kaito Kiyomiya by pinfall	Tag team match	10:05
3	Hikuleo, Shota Umino and Master Wato defeated Bullet Club War Dogs (Gedo, Gabe Kidd, and David Finlay) by submission	Six man tag team match	10:07
4	United Empire (Henare and Great-O-Khan) defeated Tomoaki Honma and Tomohiro Ishii by pinfall	Tag team match	10:53
5	Strong Style (Minoru Suzuki, El Desperado and Ren Narita) defeated Los Ingobernables de Japon (Bushi, Yota Tsuji, and Shingo Takagi) by pinfall	Six man tag team match	10:19
6	Alex Coughlin defeated Toru Yano by pinfall	D Block singles match in the G1 Climax tournament	5:07
7	Jeff Cobb vs. Shane Haste ended in a double countout	D Block singles match in the G1 Climax tournament	11:10
8	Zack Sabre Jr. defeated Hirooki Goto by submission	D Block singles match in the G1 Climax tournament	14:30
9	Tetsuya Naito defeated Hiroshi Tanahashi by pinfall	D Block singles match in the G1 Climax tournament	17:54

=== Night 17 ===
The seventeenth night of the tournament took place on August 10, 2023, at Funabashi Arena in Funabashi, Chiba.

No.	Results	Stipulations	Times
1	Los Ingobernables de Japon (Hiromu Takahashi, Shingo Takagi and Yota Tsuji) defeated TMDK (Kosei Fujita, Mikey Nicholls and Shane Haste) by pinfall	Six-man tag team match	7:55
2	Guerrillas of Destiny (Tama Tonga and Tanga Loa), El Phantasmo and Shota Umino defeated Strong Style (El Desperado, Minoru Suzuki and Ren Narita) and Hiroyoshi Tenzan by pinfall	Eight-man tag team match	9:12
3	Bullet Club (Bullet Club War Dogs (Alex Coughlin and Gabriel Kidd), Kenta and Chase Owens) defeated Just 5 Guys (Douki, Taichi, Taka Michinoku and Yoshinobu Kanemaru) by pinfall	Eight-man tag team match	9:01
4	Eddie Kingston, Hiroshi Tanahashi and Tomohiro Ishii defeated United Empire (Great-O-Khan, Jeff Cobb and Henare) by pinfall	Six-man tag team match	9:43
5	Tetsuya Naito defeated Hikuleo (with Jado) by pinfall	Quarter-final singles match in the G1 Climax tournament	13:11
6	Will Ospreay (with United Empire (Great-O-Khan and Jeff Cobb)) defeated David Finlay (with Bullet Club War Dogs (Alex Coughlin, Gabe Kidd and Gedo)) by pinfall	Quarter-final singles match in the G1 Climax tournament	17:21
7	Evil (with Dick Togo) defeated Sanada by pinfall	Quarter-final singles match in the G1 Climax tournament	16:16
8	Kazuchika Okada defeated Zack Sabre Jr. by pinfall	Quarter-final singles match in the G1 Climax tournament	21:46

=== Night 18 ===
The eighteenth night of the tournament took place on August 12, 2023, at Ryōgoku Kokugikan in Sumida, Tokyo.

No.	Results	Stipulations	Times
1^{D}	Boltin Oleg defeated Oskar Leube, Yuto Nakashima and Ryohei Oiwa by pinfall	Gauntlet match	3:10
2	Hayata and Kaito Kiyomiya defeated Hiroyoshi Tenzan and Master Wato by pinfall	Tag team match	10:57
3	Strong Style (Minoru Suzuki and Ren Narita) defeated Shota Umino and Tomoaki Honma by submission	Tag team match	10:18
4	Bullet Club (Bullet Club War Dogs (Alex Coughlin, Gabe Kidd and David Finlay), Chase Owens and Kenta) (with Gedo) defeated Chaos (Bishamon (Hirooki Goto and Yoshi-Hashi), Yoh and Toru Yano) and Togi Makabe) by pinfall	Ten-man tag team match	10:48
5	United Empire (Henare, Great-O-Khan and Jeff Cobb) defeated Los Ingobernables de Japon (Bushi, Yota Tsuji and Shingo Takagi) by submission	Six-man tag team match	10:57
6	Eddie Kingston, Ryusuke Taguchi, Hiroshi Tanahashi and Tomohiro Ishii defeated TMDK (Kosei Fujita, Shane Haste, Mikey Nicholls and Zack Sabre Jr.) by pinfall	Eight-man tag team match	11:40
7	Guerrillas of Destiny (Hikuleo, Jado, Tama Tonga and Tanga Loa) and El Phantasmo defeated Just 5 Guys ( Douki, Taka Michinoku, Sanada, Taichi and Yoshinobu Kanemaru) by pinfall	Ten-man tag team match	11:56
8	Kazuchika Okada defeated Evil (with Dick Togo)	Semi-final singles match in the G1 Climax tournament	18:18
9	Tetsuya Naito defeated Will Ospreay (with United Empire (Great-O-Khan, Henare and Jeff Cobb))	Semi-final singles match in the G1 Climax tournament	29:58
D / – this was a dark match

=== Night 19 ===
The nineteenth and final night of the tournament took place on August 13, 2023, at Ryōgoku Kokugikan in Sumida, Tokyo.

No.	Results	Stipulations	Times
1	Kaito Kiyomiya and Ryohei Oiwa defeated Oskar Leube and Toru Yano by pinfall	Tag team match	7:47
2	Master Wato, Shota Umino, Tomoaki Honma and Yuji Nagata defeated Strong Style (El Desperado, Ren Narita and Minoru Suzuki) and Yuto Nakashima by pinfall	Eight-man tag team match	8:41
3	Eddie Kingston, Hiroshi Tanahashi and Chaos (Yoh and Tomohiro Ishii) defeated TenKoji (Hiroyoshi Tenzan and Satoshi Kojima), Tiger Mask and Togi Makabe by pinfall	Eight-man tag team match	9:37
4	TMDK (Kosei Fujita, Shane Haste, Mikey Nicholls, and Zack Sabre Jr.) defeated Bishamon (Yoshi-Hashi and Hirooki Goto), Boltin Oleg and Ryusuke Taguchi by pinfall	Eight-man tag team match	10:05
5	El Phantasmo and Guerrillas of Destiny (Hikuleo, Jado, Tanga Loa, and Tama Tonga) defeated Bullet Club (Bullet Club War Dogs (Alex Coughlin, Gabe Kidd and David Finlay), Chase Owens and Kenta) by pinfall	Ten-man tag team match	11:03
6	Los Ingobernables de Japon (Bushi, Hiromu Takahashi, Shingo Takagi and Yota Tsuji) defeated United Empire (Great-O-Khan, Henare, Jeff Cobb and Will Ospreay) by pinfall	Eight-man tag team match	10:50
7	House of Torture (Dick Togo, Sho, Evil and Yujiro Takahashi) defeated Just 5 Guys (Douki, Sanada, Taichi and Yoshinobu Kanemaru) by pinfall	Eight-man tag team match	10:25
8	Tetsuya Naito defeated Kazuchika Okada by pinfall	Final singles match in the G1 Climax tournament	34:18

== Blocks ==
Final standings
Block A		Block B		Block C		Block D	
Sanada	14	Kazuchika Okada	12	David Finlay	10	Tetsuya Naito	10
Hikuleo	8	Will Ospreay	10	Evil	10	Zack Sabre Jr.	10
Yota Tsuji	7	El Phantasmo	6	Tama Tonga	9	Jeff Cobb	9
Ren Narita	6	Tanga Loa	6	Eddie Kingston	8	Alex Coughlin	6
Shota Umino	6	Kenta	6	Shingo Takagi	7	Hiroshi Tanahashi	6
Kaito Kiyomiya	6	Great-O-Khan	6	Mikey Nicholls	4	Hirooki Goto	6
Gabe Kidd	5	Taichi	6	Henare	4	Shane Haste	5
Chase Owens	4	Yoshi-Hashi	4	Tomohiro Ishii	4	Toru Yano	4

Tournament overview
Block A	Sanada	Owens	Hikuleo	Narita	Umino	Tsuji	Kidd	Kiyomiya
Sanada	—N/a	Sanada (9:13)	Sanada (10:16)	Sanada (16:30)	Sanada (18:48)	Sanada (18:36)	Sanada (12:08)	Sanada (19:58)
Owens	Sanada (9:13)	—N/a	Owens (11:20)	Narita (9:08)	Umino (9:35)	Tsuji (11:42)	Owens (2:55)	Kiyomiya (8:28)
Hikuleo	Sanada (10:16)	Owens (11:20)	—N/a	Hikuleo (11:58)	Hikuleo (17:21)	Hikuleo (12:12)	Kidd (3:29)	Hikuleo (9:46)
Narita	Sanada (16:30)	Narita (9:08)	Hikuleo (11:58)	—N/a	Draw (20:00)	Draw (20:00)	Kidd (10:05)	Narita (15:17)
Umino	Sanada (18:48)	Umino (9:35)	Hikuleo (17:21)	Draw (20:00)	—N/a	Tsuji (19:20)	Umino (13:03)	Draw (20:00)
Tsuji	Sanada (18:36)	Tsuji (11:42)	Hikuleo (12:12)	Draw (20:00)	Tsuji (19:20)	—N/a	Tsuji (14:47)	Kiyomiya (14:48)
Kidd	Sanada (12:08)	Owens (2:55)	Kidd (3:29)	Kidd (10:05)	Umino (13:03)	Tsuji (14:47)	—N/a	Draw (11:44)
Kiyomiya	Sanada (19:58)	Kiyomiya (8:28)	Hikuleo (9:46)	Narita (15:17)	Draw (20:00)	Kiyomiya (14:48)	Draw (11:44)	—N/a
Block B	Okada	Yoshi-Hashi	Taichi	Kenta	O-Khan	Ospreay	Loa	Phantasmo
Okada	—N/a	Okada (16:32)	Okada (16:20)	Okada (19:10)	Okada (15:23)	Ospreay (17:21)	Okada (12:33)	Okada (16:21)
Yoshi-Hashi	Okada (16:32)	—N/a	Taichi (13:13)	Kenta (12:16)	O-Khan (13:50)	Ospreay (13:04)	Yoshi-Hashi (12:35)	Yoshi-Hashi (10:56)
Taichi	Okada (16:20)	Taichi (13:13)	—N/a	Kenta (2:11)	O-Khan (17:41)	Taichi (17:43)	Taichi (12:34)	Phantasmo (13:56)
Kenta	Okada (19:10)	Kenta (12:16)	Kenta (2:11)	—N/a	Kenta (11:40)	Ospreay (14:02)	Loa (12:46)	Phantasmo (0:19)
O-Khan	Okada (15:23)	O-Khan (13:50)	O-Khan (17:41)	Kenta (11:40)	—N/a	Ospreay (11:20)	Loa (12:41)	O-Khan (12:46)
Ospreay	Ospreay (17:21)	Ospreay (13:04)	Taichi (17:43)	Ospreay (14:02)	Ospreay (11:20)	—N/a	Loa (15:34)	Ospreay (18:52)
Loa	Okada (12:33)	Yoshi-Hashi (12:35)	Taichi (12:34)	Loa (12:46)	Loa (12:41)	Loa (15:34)	—N/a	Phantasmo (12:14)
Phantasmo	Okada (16:21)	Yoshi-Hashi (10:56)	Phantasmo (13:56)	Phantasmo (0:19)	O-Khan (12:46)	Ospreay (18:52)	Phantasmo (12:14)	—N/a
Block C	Finlay	Ishii	Evil	Tonga	Takagi	Henare	Kingston	Nicholls
Finlay	—N/a	Finlay (15:55)	Finlay (16:12)	Tonga (14:22)	Takagi (18:45)	Finlay (11:54)	Finlay (16:34)	Finlay (9:52)
Ishii	Finlay (15:55)	—N/a	Evil (14:36)	Tonga (15:38)	Takagi (18:10)	Henare (14:21)	Ishii (16:12)	Ishii (13:01)
Evil	Finlay (16:12)	Evil (14:36)	—N/a	Evil (17:34)	Evil (17:40)	Evil (12:03)	Evil (15:15)	Nicholls (9:40)
Tonga	Tonga (14:22)	Tonga (15:38)	Evil (17:34)	—N/a	Draw (20:00)	Tonga (14:30)	Kingston (11:39)	Tonga (9:10)
Takagi	Takagi (18:45)	Takagi (18:10)	Evil (17:40)	Draw (20:00)	—N/a	Henare (19:38)	Kingston (12:50)	Takagi (9:13)
Henare	Finlay (11:54)	Henare (14:21)	Evil (12:03)	Tonga (14:30)	Henare (19:38)	—N/a	Kingston (10:32)	Nicholls (12:21)
Kingston	Finlay (16:34)	Ishii (16:12)	Evil (15:15)	Kingston (11:39)	Kingston (12:50)	Kingston (10:32)	—N/a	Kingston (8:33)
Nicholls	Finlay (9:52)	Ishii (13:01)	Nicholls (9:40)	Tonga (9:10)	Takagi (9:13)	Nicholls (12:21)	Kingston (8:33)	—N/a
Block D	Tanahashi	Naito	Goto	Sabre	Yano	Cobb	Haste	Coughlin
Tanahashi	—N/a	Naito (17:54)	Tanahashi (14:40)	Sabre (16:09)	Tanahashi (7:45)	Cobb (10:30)	Tanahashi (12:04)	Coughlin (8:50)
Naito	Naito (17:54)	—N/a	Naito (17:40)	Naito (18:30)	Naito (7:24)	Cobb (14:20)	Haste (13:44)	Naito (10:07)
Goto	Tanahashi (14:40)	Naito (17:40)	—N/a	Sabre (14:30)	Goto (6:44)	Goto (11:33)	Goto (2:29)	Coughlin (6:23)
Sabre	Sabre (16:09)	Naito (18:30)	Sabre (14:30)	—N/a	Sabre (5:37)	Cobb (16:16)	Sabre (13:23)	Sabre (11:13)
Yano	Tanahashi (7:45)	Naito (7:24)	Goto (6:44)	Sabre (5:37)	—N/a	Yano (1:49)	Yano (6:09)	Coughlin (5:07)
Cobb	Cobb (10:30)	Cobb (14:20)	Goto (11:33)	Cobb (16:16)	Yano (1:49)	—N/a	Draw (11:10)	Cobb (9:51)
Haste	Tanahashi (12:04)	Haste (13:44)	Goto (2:29)	Sabre (13:23)	Yano (6:09)	Draw (11:10)	—N/a	Haste (10:55)
Coughlin	Coughlin (8:50)	Naito (10:07)	Coughlin (6:23)	Sabre (11:13)	Coughlin (5:07)	Cobb (9:51)	Haste (10:55)	—N/a

Quarterfinals
A1	Sanada	16:16
C2	Evil	Pin
B1	Kazuchika Okada	Pin
D2	Zack Sabre Jr.	21:46
C1	David Finlay	17:21
B2	Will Ospreay	Pin
D1	Tetsuya Naito	Pin
A2	Hikuleo	13:11

Semifinals
C2	Evil	18:18
B1	Kazuchika Okada	Pin
B2	Will Ospreay	29:58
D1	Tetsuya Naito	Pin

Finals
B1	Kazuchika Okada	34:18
D1	Tetsuya Naito	Pin
