= Takatama Station =

Railway station in Tendō, Yamagata Prefecture, Japan

Takatama Station 高擶駅
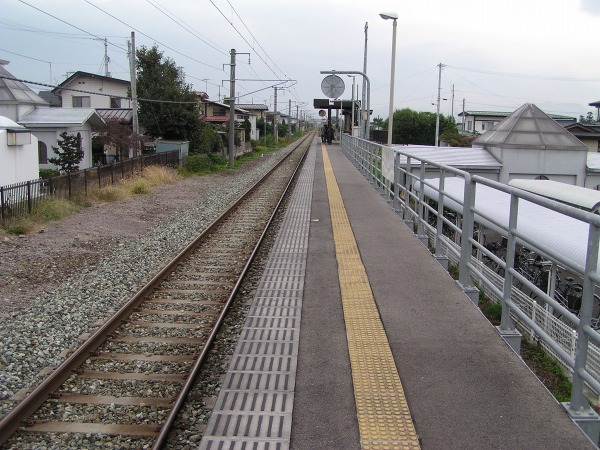
- Takatama Station platform, October 2005

General information
- Location: Nagaoka, Tendō-shi, Yamagata-ken; Japan
- Coordinates: 38°19′52″N 140°21′32″E
- Operator: JR East
- Line: ■ Ōu Main Line
- Distance: 97.0 km from Fukushima
- Platforms: 1 side platform

Other information
- Status: Unstaffed
- Website: Official website

History
- Opened: 5 March 1952

Services
Preceding station	JR East	Following station
Urushiyama towards Fukushima	Yamagata Line	Tendō-Minami towards Shinjō
Location
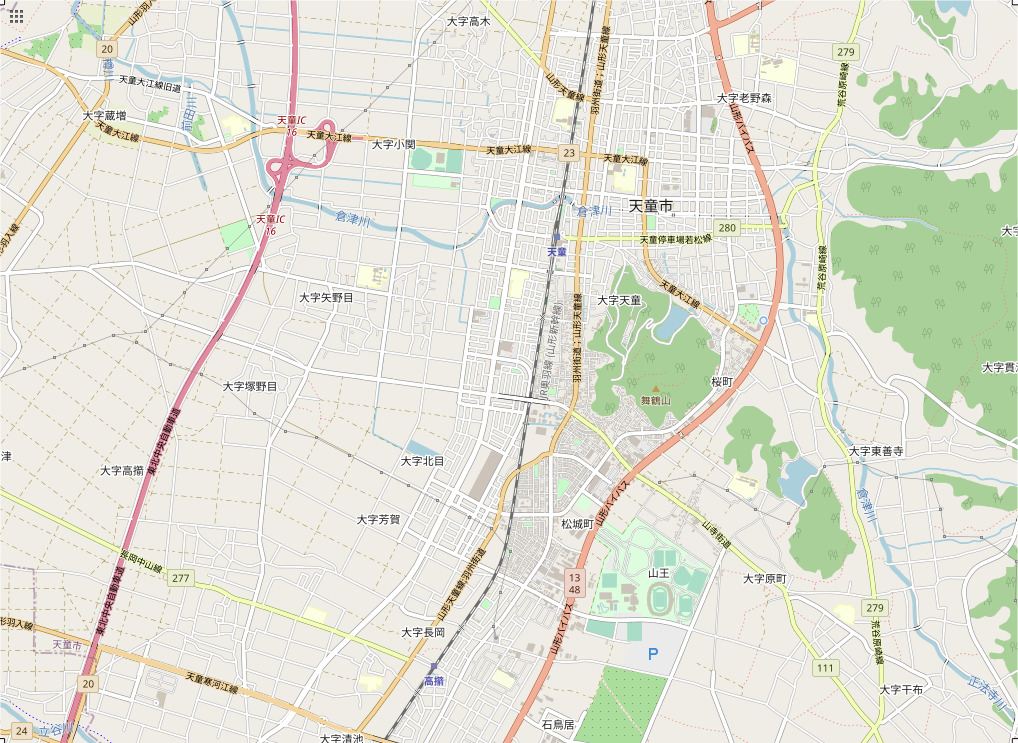
- Location within Tendo, Yamagata Location within Yamagata Prefecture Location within Japan

Takatama Station (高擶駅, Takatama-eki) is a railway station in the city of Tendō, Yamagata, Japan, operated by East Japan Railway Company (JR East).

== Lines ==
Takatama Station is served by the Ōu Main Line, and is located 97.0 kilometres (60.3 mi) rail kilometers from the terminus of the line at Fukushima Station.

== Station layout ==
The station has one side platform serving a single bi-directional track. The station is unattended.

== History ==
Takatama Station opened on 5 March 1952. The station was absorbed into the JR East network upon the privatization of JNR on 1 April 1987. A new station building was completed in 1999.

== Surrounding area ==
The area around the station is a dormitory community which then gives way in the west to rice paddies and fields and to the east to the mountains.

- Uyō-Gakuen College

== See also ==
- List of railway stations in Japan
