= Tendō-Minami Station =

Railway station in Tendō, Yamagata Prefecture, Japan

Tendō-Minami Station 天童南駅
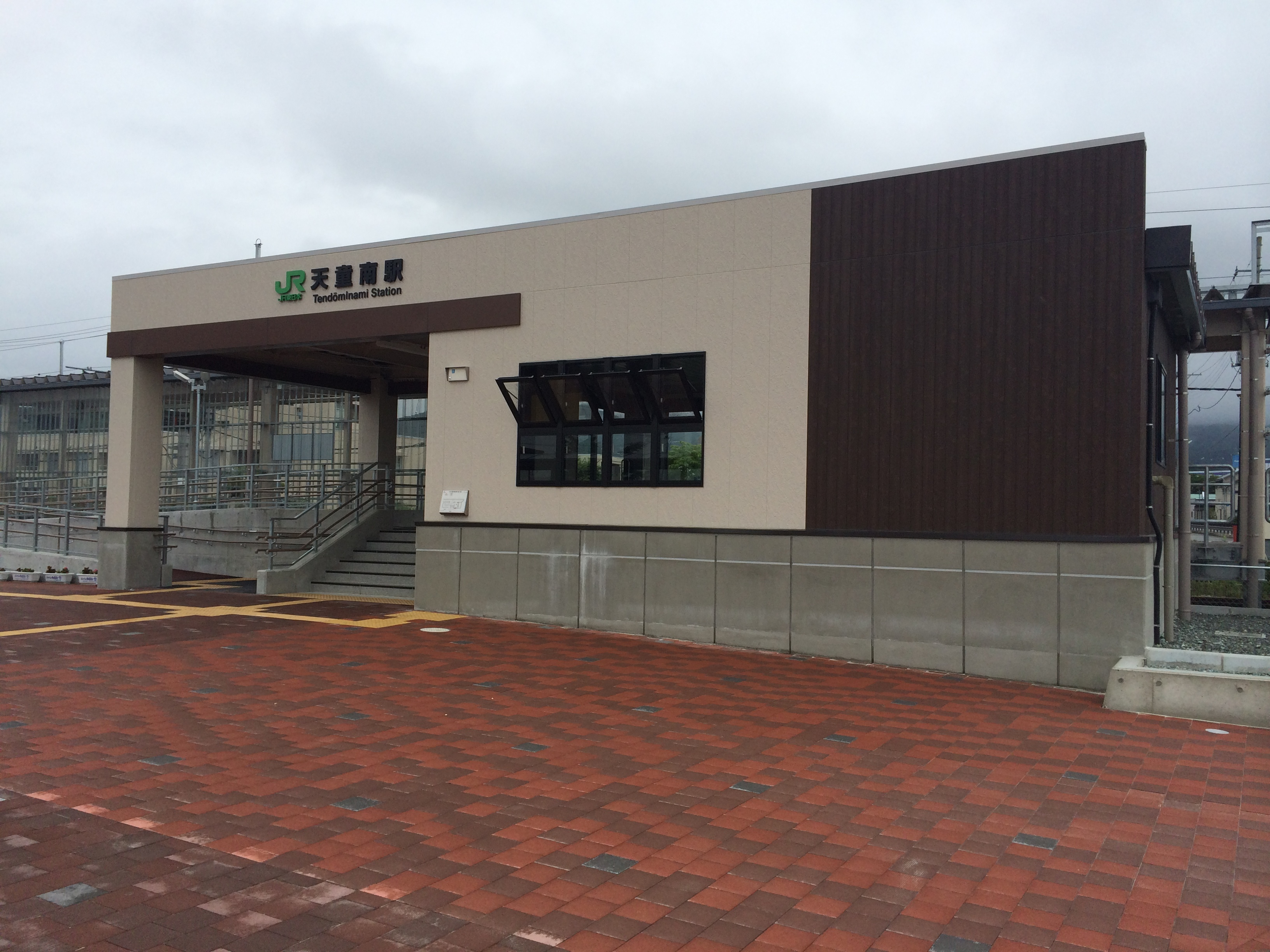
- Tendō-Minami station building, June 2015

General information
- Location: Oazakitame, Tendō-shi, Yamagata-ken; Japan
- Coordinates: 38°20′29″N 140°21′56″E
- Operator: JR East
- Line: ■ Ōu Main Line
- Distance: 98.3 km from Fukushima
- Platforms: 1 side platform

Other information
- Status: Unstaffed
- Website: Official website

History
- Opened: 14 March 2015

Services
Preceding station	JR East	Following station
Takatama towards Fukushima	Yamagata Line	Tendō towards Shinjō
Location
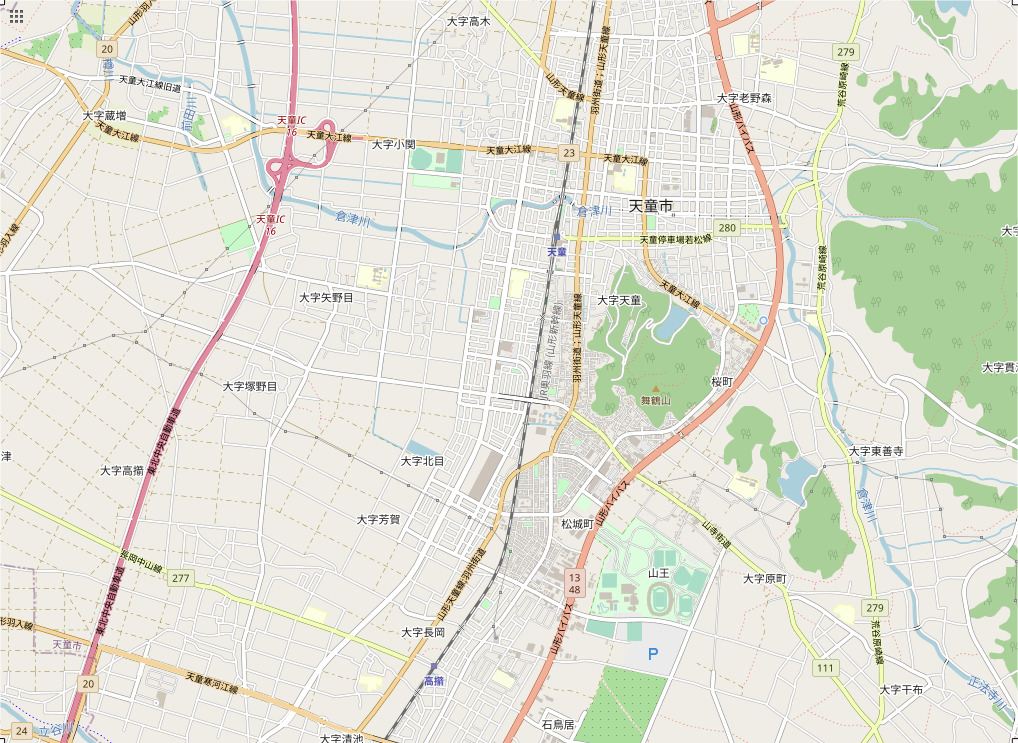
- Location within Tendo, Yamagata Location within Yamagata Prefecture Location within Japan

Tendō-Minami Station (天童南駅, Tendōminami-eki) is a railway station in the city of Tendō, Yamagata, Japan, operated by East Japan Railway Company (JR East).

== Lines ==
Tendō-Minami Station is served by the Ōu Main Line, and is located 98.3 kilometres (61.1 mi) rail kilometers from the terminus of the line at Fukushima Station.

== Station layout ==
The station has one side platform serving a single bi-directional track. The station is unattended.

== History ==
Tendō-Minami Station opened on 14 March 2015.

== Surrounding area ==
- Aeon Mall Tendō (Io-Ten)
- Lala-Park Tendō
- Yamagata Prefectural General Sports Park
- Yamagata Prefectural General Sports Park Gymnasium
- ND Soft Stadium Yamagata

== See also ==
- List of railway stations in Japan
