= Uyō-Gakuen College =

Private University in Tendo, Yamagata, Japan

Coordinates: 38°19′49″N 140°21′13″E

Uyo Gakuen College
- 羽陽学園短期大学
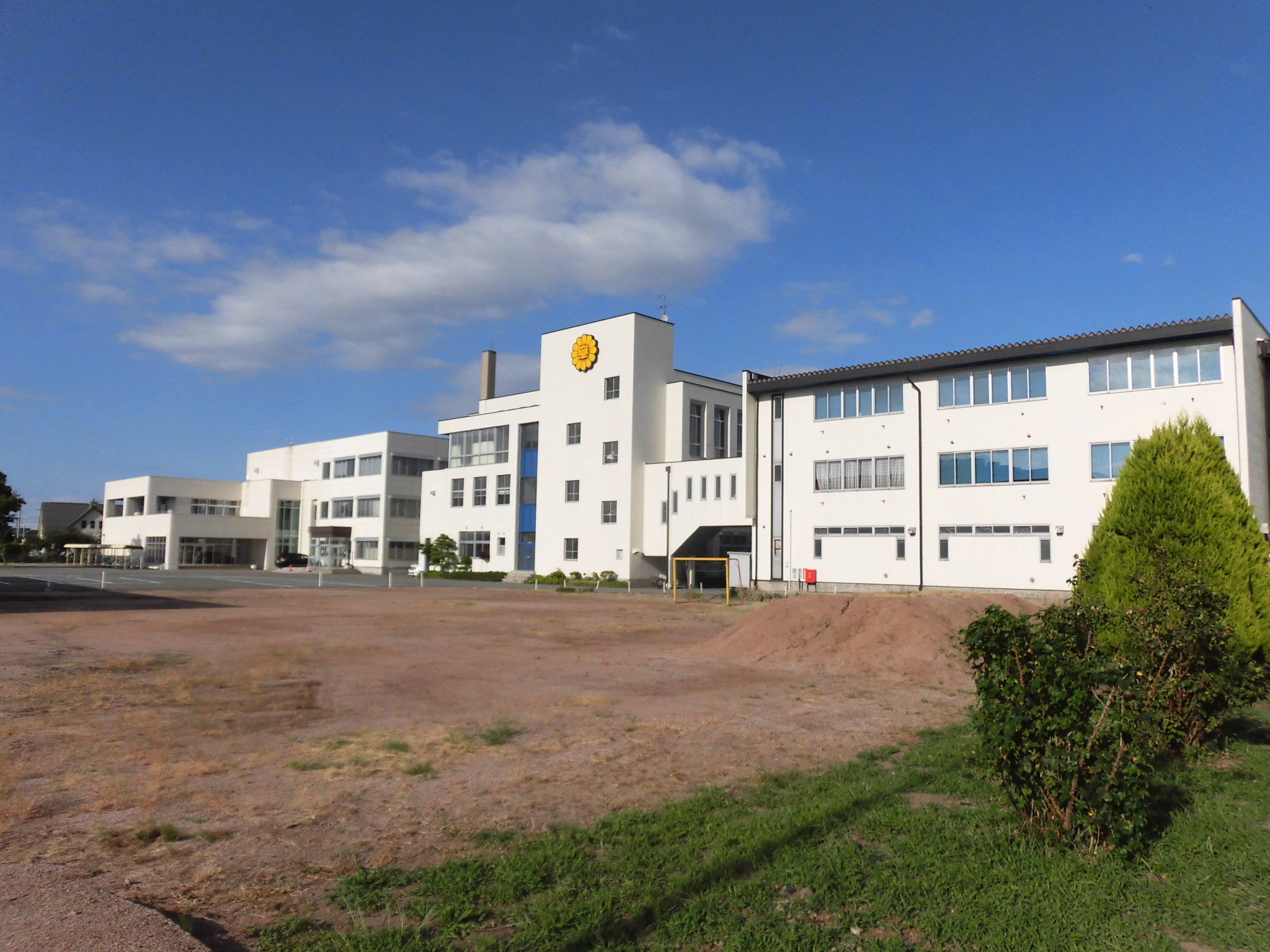
- Type: Private
- Established: 1982
- Location: Tendo, Yamagata, Japan
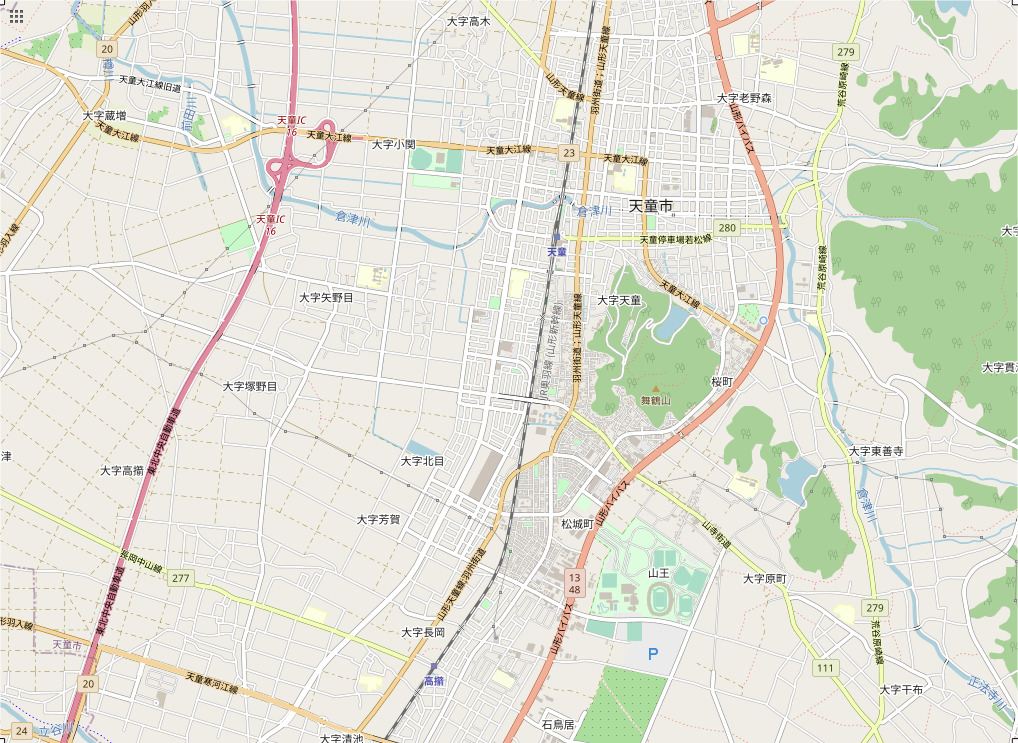
- Location in Tendo, Yamagata Uyō-Gakuen College (Yamagata Prefecture) Uyō-Gakuen College (Tohoku, Japan) Uyō-Gakuen College (Japan)

Uyo Gakuen College (羽陽学園短期大学, Uyō gakuen tanki daigaku) is a private university in Tendo, Yamagata, Japan, established in 1982. The predecessor of the school, a training school for kindergarten teachers, was founded in 1965.

== Names of Academic department ==
- Childhood studies

== Advanced course ==
- Major of Personal Care Assistant studies
