= Yamagata Prefectural General Sports Park Gymnasium =

Gymnasium in Tendō, Japan

Coordinates: 38°20′10.7″N 140°22′31.8″E

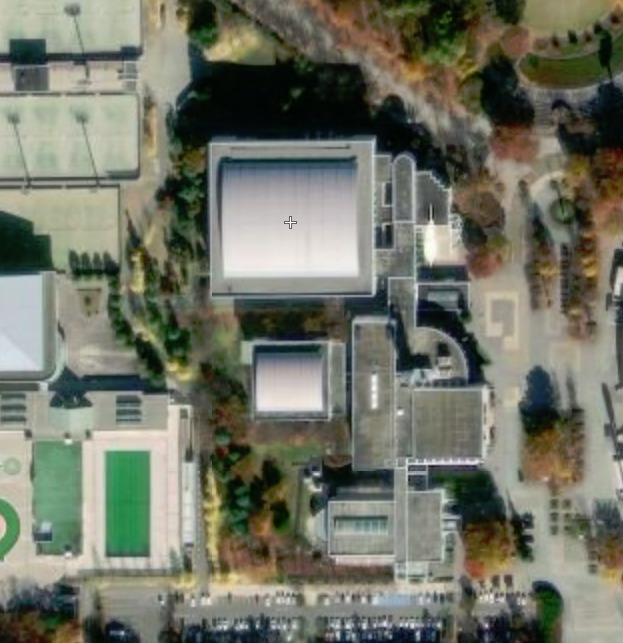

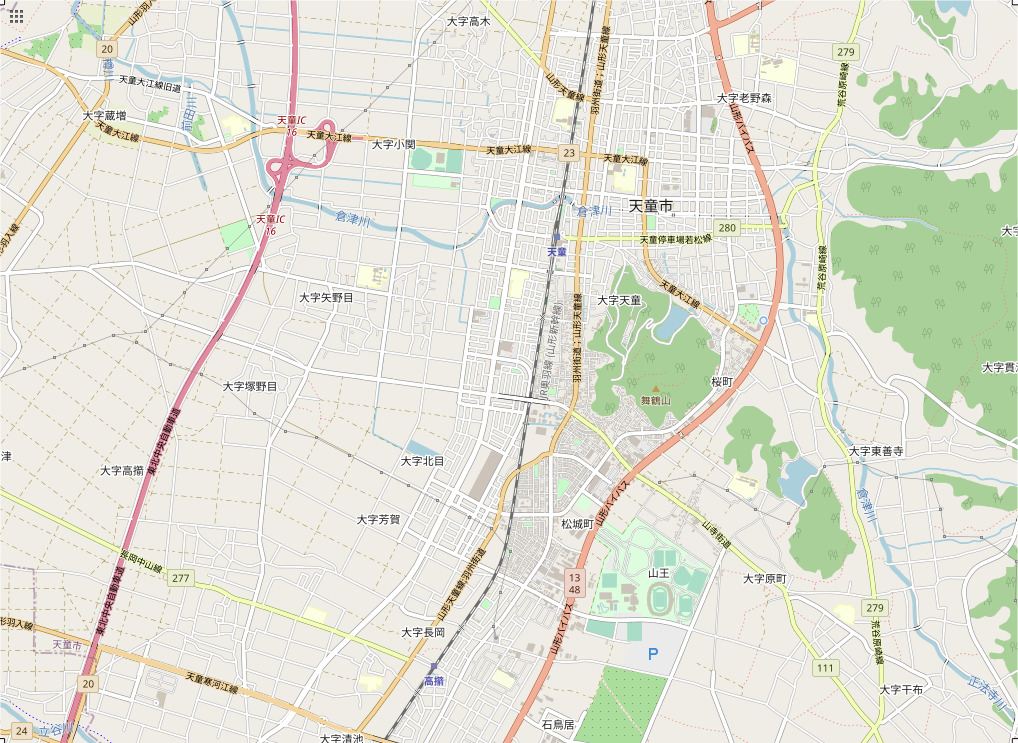
- Location within Tendo, Yamagata Location within Yamagata Prefecture Location within Japan
- Full name: Yamagata Prefectural General Sports Park Gymnasium
- Location: Tendo, Yamagata, Japan
- Owner: Yamagata Prefecture
- Operator: Montedio Yamagata
- Capacity: 3,976
- Field size: 2,446 sqm
- Public transit: Japan Railways Tendo Minami Station
- Parking: 6,000 spaces

Construction
- Opened: 1992
- Cost

Tenants
- Yamagata Wyverns; Prestige International Aranmare Yamagata; Pioneer Red Wings

Website
- Official site

Yamagata Prefectural General Sports Park Gymnasium is an arena in Tendo, Yamagata, Japan. It is the part of Benibana Sports Park and the home arena of the Passlab Yamagata Wyverns of the B.League, Japan's professional basketball league.
