= Xebio Arena Sendai =

Stadium in the city of Sendai, Japan

Coordinates: 38°13′49.42″N 140°53′13.74″E

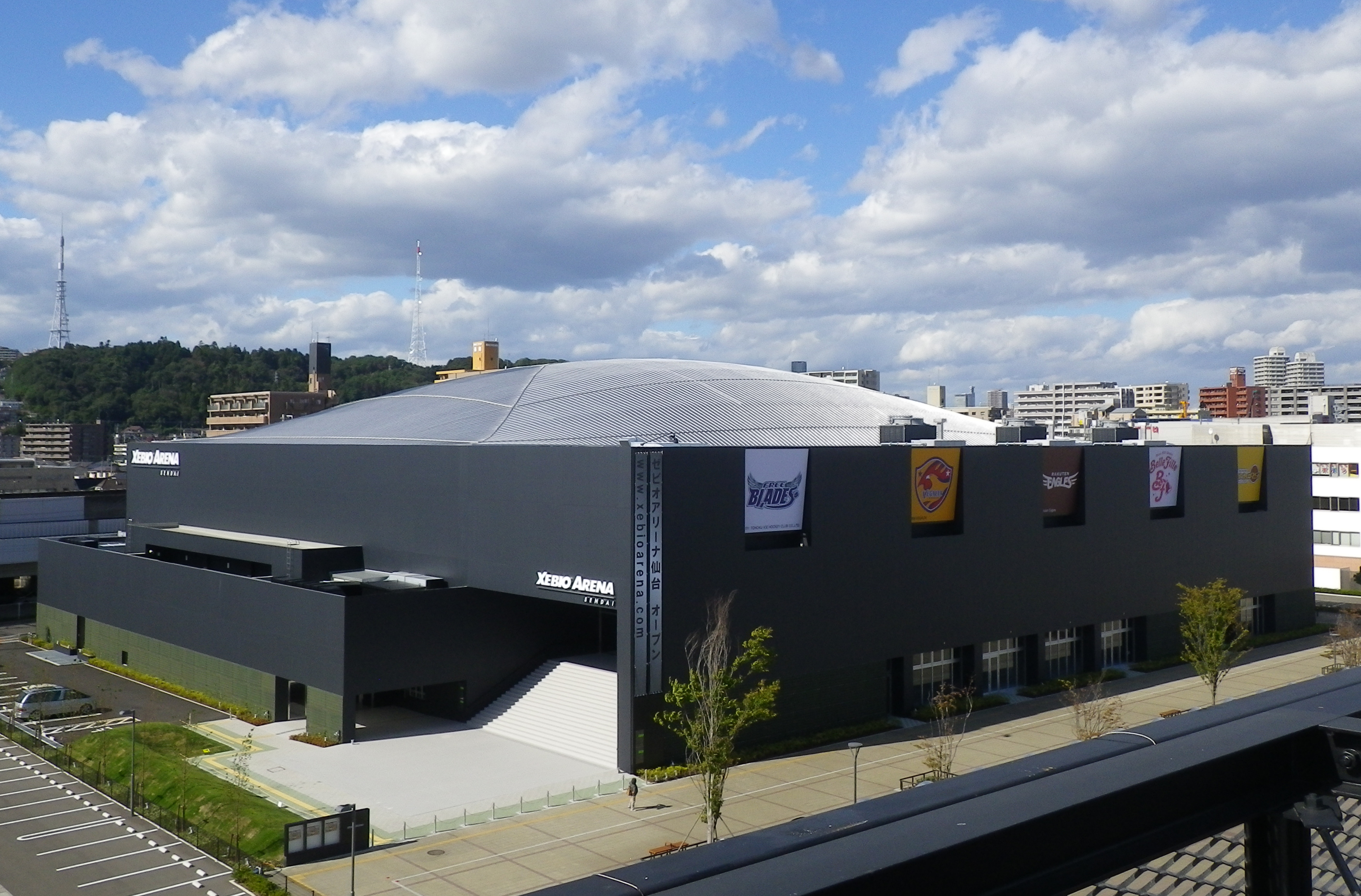

- Location within Miyagi Prefecture Location within Japan
- Interactive map of Xebio Arena Sendai
- Full name: Xebio Arena Sendai
- Location: Sendai, Miyagi Prefecture, Japan
- Owner: Xebio Holdings
- Capacity: 4,002+1,000: basketball
- Scoreboard: Daktronics LED centerhung scoreboard & ribbons
- Field size: 11,707.7 m^{2}

Construction
- Opened: September 20, 2012
- Cost: ¥3 billion (US$18.95 million)
- Architects: Sato Kogyo, Co. Ltd
- Structural engineer: Sato Kogyo
- Main contractor: Sato Kogyo

Tenant
- Sendai 89ers (2012–2016, 2019–)

Website
- www.xebioarena.com

Xebio Arena Sendai (ゼビオアリーナ仙台) is an arena located in the city of Sendai in Miyagi Prefecture, Japan. It serves as the home arena for the Sendai 89ers of the B.League, Japan's professional basketball league.

Since July 2025, Xebio Arena Sendai is housing a permanent skating rink. Xebio Arena Sendai is the second facility in Japan, after Flat Hachinohe, that can be used as both and ice rink and an arena for matches and concerts thanks to special insulation and wooden floors that can be laid on top of the ice.

== History ==
In November 2023, it was announced that the arena would undergo renovation in 2024, including the construction of an ice rink that meets international standards, with a length of 60 meters and a width of 30 meters. The project, presented by the mayor, received support from Yuzuru Hanyu, a two-time Olympic champion.

On July 5th, 2025, the renovated Xebio Arena Sendai opened. Sendai City, in partnership with major sports retailer Xebio Holdings, established this year-round ice rink to provide better training facilities for skaters. The new ice rink is the only one in Miyagi prefecture that meets international standards and can host official figure skating competitions.

The opening ceremony was held on July 5th, 2025. The ice show "The First Skate," featuring professional figure skaters Yuzuru Hanyu, Akiko Suzuki, Rika Hongo, and Takeshi Honda, took place on the inaugural day. The sold-out ice show drew widespread attention, receiving more than 30,000 applications for 3,378 available seats and attracting coverage from 39 media outlets.

== Sports events ==
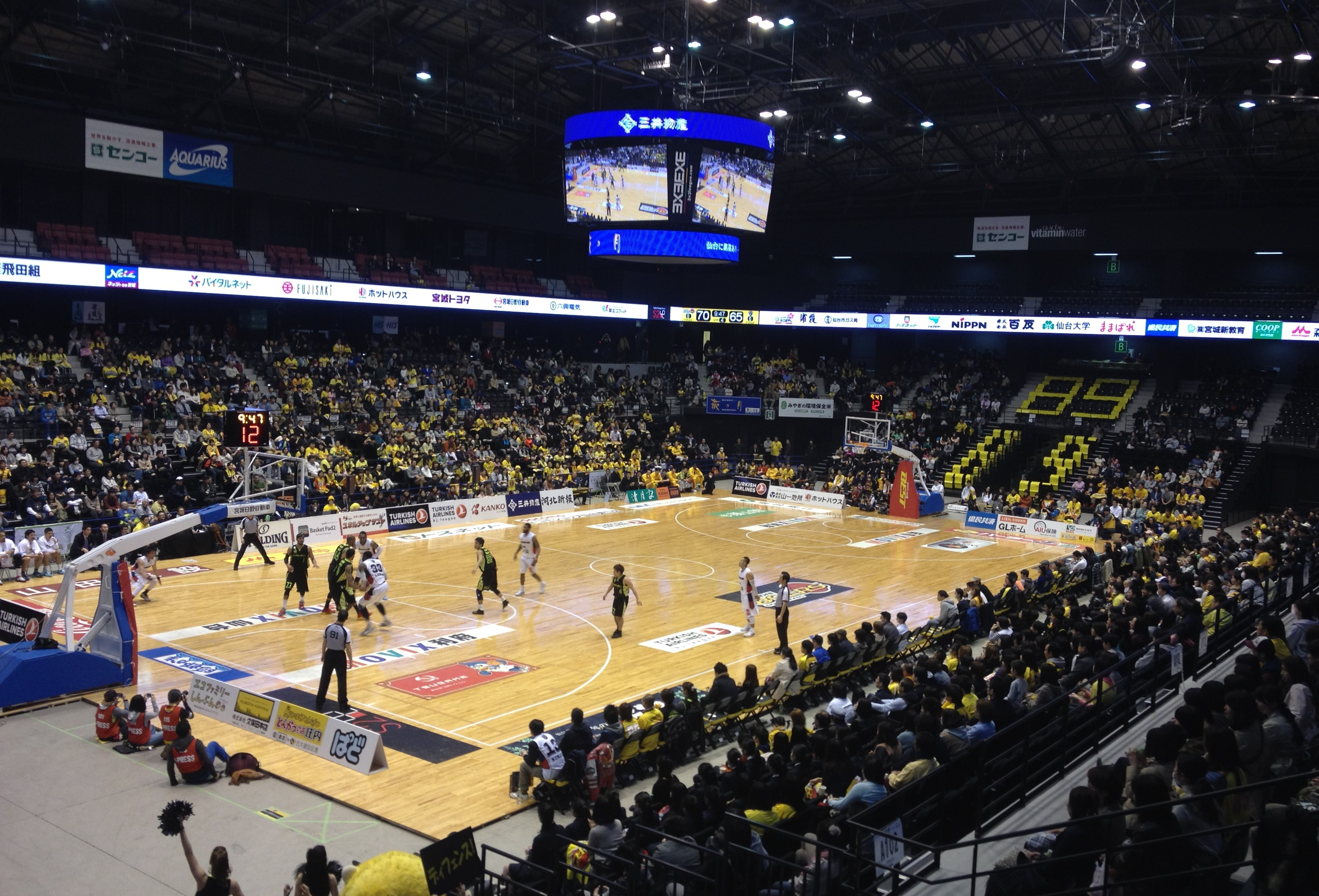

- bj League All-star Game (2016)
- New Japan Pro-Wrestling's New Japan Cup final (2021, planned)

== Entertainment events ==
- Kiss (2019)
- Journey (2017)
- One Ok Rock (2013)
- Momoiro Clover Z (2013)
- Seiko Matsuda (2014)
- Uverworld (2014, 2016)
- Nana Mizuki (2015)
- Miwa (2017)
- Kenji Sawada (2018)
- King Gnu (2021)
- The First Skate (2025)

== Access ==
- Namboku Line and Tohoku Main Line: 5 minutes' walk from Nagamachi Station.

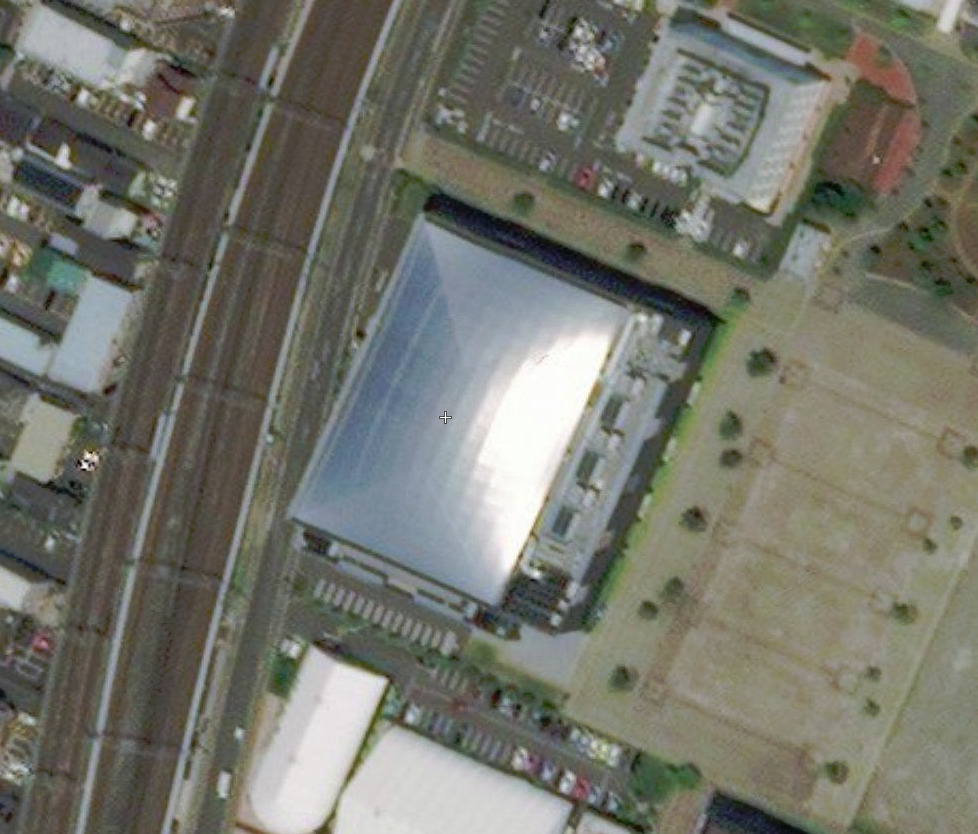
Satellite view
