= Tendō, Yamagata =

Tendō 天童市
- City
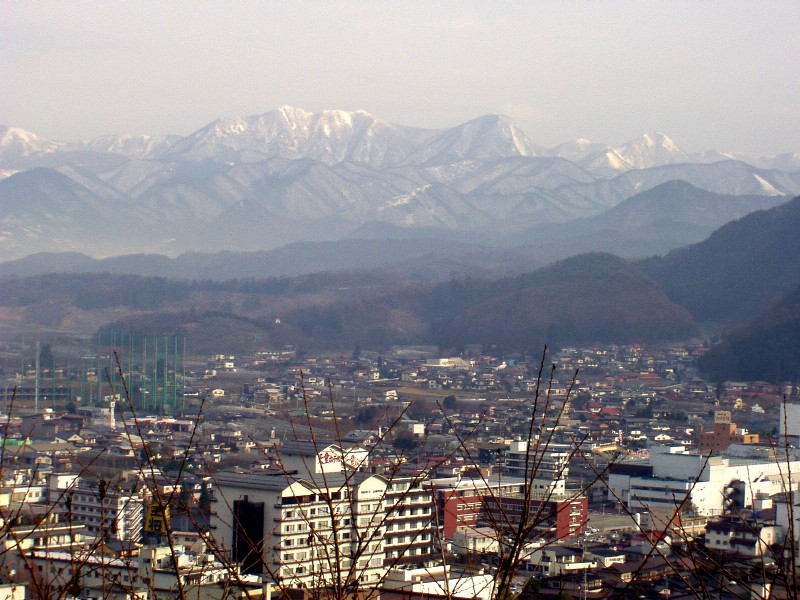
- Tendō skyline

- Flag Seal

- Location of Tendō in Yamagata Prefecture

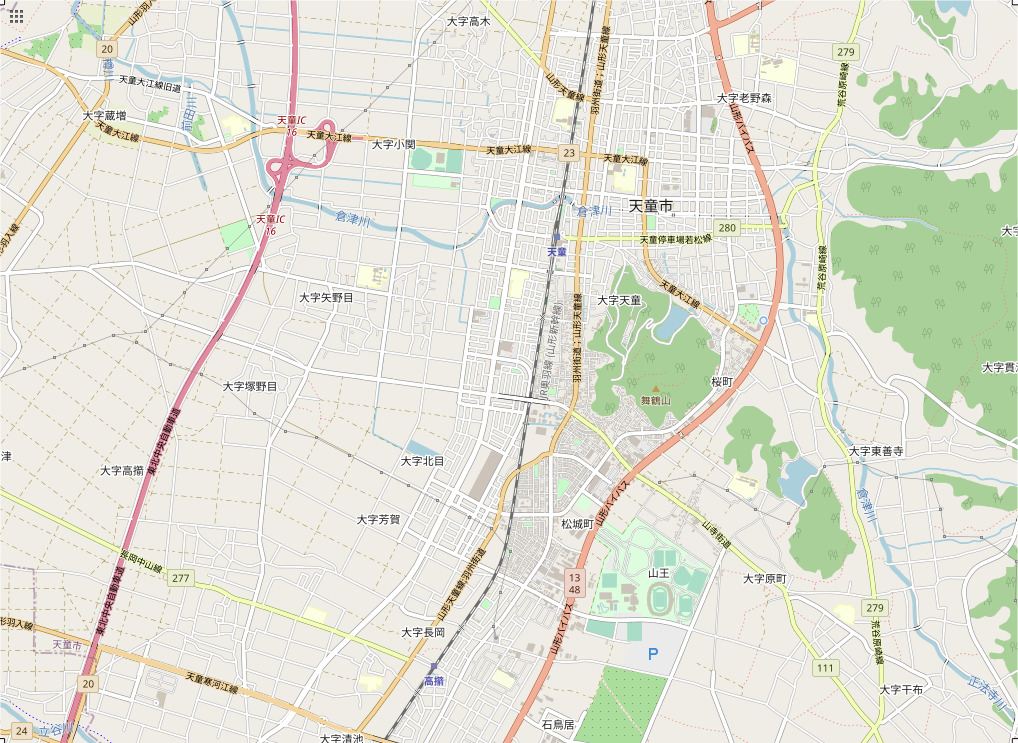
- Tendō (Tohoku, Japan) Tendō (Japan)
- Coordinates: 38°21′44.2″N 140°22′40.6″E
- Country: Japan
- Region: Tōhoku
- Prefecture: Yamagata

Government
  - Mayor: Shigeru Niizeki (from December 2024)

Area
  - Total: 113.01 km^{2} (43.63 sq mi)

Population (February 2020)
  - Total: 61,947
  - Density: 548.16/km^{2} (1,419.7/sq mi)
- Time zone: UTC+9 (Japan Standard Time)
- City symbols
  - Tree: Maple
  - Flower: Azalea
  - Bird: Meadow bunting
- Phone number: 023-654-1111
- Address: 1-1-1 Oinomori, Tendō-shi, Yamagata-ken 994-8510
- Website: Official website

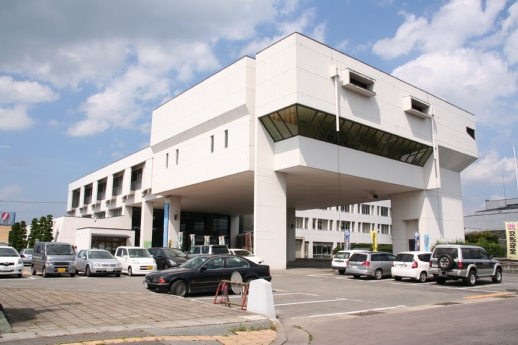
Tendō City Hall

Tendō (天童市, Tendō-shi) is a city located in Yamagata Prefecture, Japan. As of 1 February 2020, the city had an estimated population of 61,947 in 22392 households, and a population density of 550 persons per km^{2}. The total area of the city is 113.01 square kilometres (43.63 square miles).

== Geography ==
Tendō is located in the east-central portion of the Yamagata Basin, bordered by the Ōu Mountains to the east.

=== Neighboring municipalities ===
- Yamagata Prefecture
  - Higashine
  - Kahoku
  - Nakayama
  - Sagae
  - Yamagata

=== Climate ===
Tendō has a humid continental climate (Köppen climate classification Cfa) with large seasonal temperature differences, with warm to hot (and often humid) summers and cold (sometimes severely cold) winters. Precipitation is significant throughout the year, but is heaviest from August to October. The average annual temperature in Tendō is 11.1 °C. The average annual rainfall is 1381 mm with September as the wettest month. The temperatures are highest on average in August, at around 24.8 °C, and lowest in January, at around -1.4 °C.

== Demographics ==
Per Japanese census data, the population of Tendō has remained relatively stable in recent decades.

Historical population
Year	Pop.	±%
1960	44,521	—
1970	44,758	+0.5%
1980	52,597	+17.5%
1990	57,339	+9.0%
2000	63,231	+10.3%
2010	62,214	−1.6%
2020	62,140	−0.1%

== History ==
During the Edo period, the area of present-day Tendō was part of Tendō Domain, a 20,000 koku feudal domain under the Tokugawa shogunate controlled by the Oda clan, who ruled from 1831 to 1871.

After the start of the Meiji period, the area organized as Tendō Village under Higashimurayama District, Yamagata Prefecture in 1878. It was elevated to town status on April 27, 1892 and became a city on October 1, 1958.

== Government ==
Tendō has a mayor-council form of government with a directly elected mayor and a unicameral city legislature of 22 members. The city contributes two members to the Yamagata Prefectural Assembly. In terms of national politics, the city is part of Yamagata District 1 of the lower house of the Diet of Japan.

== Economy ==
The economy of Tendō is based on seasonal tourism, agriculture and wood products. The city is traditionally known for its production of the wooden pieces (koma) used in Japanese chess (shogi), and games of "human shogi" have been played since 1966. The city also has numerous onsen hot springs within its borders.

== Education ==
- Uyō-Gakuen College
- Tendō has twelve public elementary schools and four public middle schools operated by the city government and one public high school operated by the Yamagata Prefectural Board of Education. There is also one private high school.

== Transportation ==
=== Railway ===
East Japan Railway Company - Yamagata Shinkansen

- Tendō

East Japan Railway Company - Ōu Main Line

- Takatama- Tendō-Minami - Tendō - Midaregawa

=== Highways ===
- Tōhoku-Chūō Expressway – Tendō Interchange
- National Route 13
- National Route 48

== Sister cities ==
Tendō is twinned with:

- Marlborough, New Zealand (1989)
- Marostica, Italy (1993)
- Wafangdian, China (2002)

== Notable people ==
- Kenta Kurihara (born 1982), professional baseball player
- Chiyako Sato (born 1897), musician
- Kenji Shimizu (born 1940), founder of Tendoryu Aikido
- Genjiyama Tsunagorō (born 1786), sumo wrestler
